= Oak Hill =

Oak Hill may refer to:

== Places ==
=== United States ===
- Oak Hill, Alabama
- Oak Hill, Florida
- Oak Hill, Kansas
- Oak Hill, Kentucky
- Oak Hill, Maine
- Oak Hill, Massachusetts
- Oak Hill, Missouri
- Oak Hill, New Jersey
- Oak Hill, New York, a hamlet in Greene County
- Oak Hill (Herkimer County, New York), an elevation in Herkimer County
- Oak Hill, Ohio
- Oak Hill, Tennessee
- Oak Hill, Texas (disambiguation), several places
- Oak Hill, Albemarle County, Virginia
- Oak Hill, Fairfax County, Virginia
- Oak Hill, Page County, Virginia
- Oak Hill, Pittsylvania County, Virginia
- Oak Hill, West Virginia
- Oak Hill, Wisconsin

=== Other ===
- Oak Hill, Nova Scotia, Canada
- Oak Hill, Staffordshire, England
- Oak Hill, Suffolk, a location in England

== Buildings ==
- Oak Hill (James Monroe house), a mansion and plantation in Aldie, Virginia
- Oak Hill & The Martha Berry Museum, the home of Berry College founder Martha Berry in Rome, Georgia
- Oak Hill (Calvert City, Kentucky)
- Oak Hill (Jessup, Maryland)
- Oak Hill (Linlithgo, New York)
- Oak Hill (Chillicothe, Ohio)
- Oak Hill (Annandale, Virginia), a Georgian style home built in 1790
- Oak Hill (Colonial Heights, Virginia), a building from 1825
- Oak Hill (Cumberland, Virginia), a Federal style building from 1810
- Oak Hill (Delaplane, Virginia), a private residence consisting of two separate houses connected by a passageway
- Oak Hill (Oak Ridge, Virginia), a historic plantation

== Other uses ==
- USS Oak Hill (LSD-7), an Ashland-class dock landing ship launched in 1943 and struck in 1969
- USS Oak Hill (LSD-51), a Harpers Ferry-class dock landing ship launched in 1994

== See also ==
- Oak Hill Academy (disambiguation)
- Oak Hill Cemetery (disambiguation)
- Oak Hill Historic District (disambiguation)
- Oak Hill Township (disambiguation)
- Oak Hill Country Club, Rochester, New York
- Oak Hill-Piney, Oklahoma
- Oak Hill Plantation, Lamont, Florida
- Oak Hill Theological College, Southgate, London
- Oakhill (disambiguation)
- Oak Hills (disambiguation)
