= Oak Hill, Virginia =

Oak Hill, Virginia may refer to:

- Oak Hill, Albemarle County, Virginia
- Oak Hill, Fairfax County, Virginia
- Oak Hill, Page County, Virginia
- Oak Hill, Pittsylvania County, Virginia

== See also ==
- Oak Hill (Annandale, Virginia), a Georgian style home built in 1790
- Oak Hill (Colonial Heights, Virginia), a building from 1825
- Oak Hill (Cumberland, Virginia), a Federal style building from 1810
- Oak Hill (Delaplane, Virginia), a private residence consisting of two separate houses connected by a passageway
- Oak Hill (James Monroe house), a mansion and plantation near Leesburg, Virginia
- Oak Hill, West Virginia, in part of the territory that seceded from Virginia during the U.S. Civil War to form West Virginia
- Oak Hill (disambiguation)
