= List of United Kingdom locations: Oa-Od =

Locations list

The United Kingdom

This is part of the list of United Kingdom locations: a gazetteer of place names in the United Kingdom showing each place's locality and geographical coordinates.

== Oa ==
Location	Locality	Coordinates (links to map & photo sources)	OS grid reference
Oadby	Leicestershire	52.59°N 01.08°W	SK6200
Oad Street	Kent	51.32°N 00.66°E	TQ8662
Oakall Green	Worcestershire	52.23°N 02.27°W	SO8160
Oakamoor	Staffordshire	52.99°N 01.92°W	SK0544
Oak Bank	Bury	53.54°N 02.28°W	SD8105
Oakbank	West Lothian	55.87°N 03.48°W	NT0766
Oak Cross	Devon	50.77°N 04.08°W	SX5399
Oakdale	Poole	50.72°N 01.97°W	SZ0292
Oakdale	Caerffili (Caerphilly)	51.67°N 03.18°W	ST1898
Oakdale	North Yorkshire	53.99°N 01.57°W	SE2855
Oake	Somerset	51.01°N 03.21°W	ST1525
Oake Green	Somerset	51.01°N 03.21°W	ST1525
Oaken	Staffordshire	52.61°N 02.22°W	SJ8502
Oakenclough	Lancashire	53.91°N 02.70°W	SD5447
Oakengates	Shropshire	52.69°N 02.44°W	SJ7011
Oakenholt	Flintshire	53.23°N 03.11°W	SJ2671
Oakenshaw	Durham	54.71°N 01.69°W	NZ2036
Oakenshaw	Lancashire	53.77°N 02.39°W	SD7431
Oakenshaw	Kirklees	53.73°N 01.74°W	SE1727
Oakerthorpe	Derbyshire	53.08°N 01.43°W	SK3854
Oakes	Kirklees	53.64°N 01.83°W	SE1117
Oakfield	Isle of Wight	50.71°N 01.16°W	SZ5991
Oakfield	Hertfordshire	51.93°N 00.27°W	TL1928
Oakfield	TorFaen (Torfaen)	51.63°N 03.02°W	ST2993
Oakford	Devon	50.97°N 03.56°W	SS9021
Oakford	Ceredigion	52.19°N 04.26°W	SN4558
Oakfordbridge	Devon	50.97°N 03.55°W	SS9121
Oakgrove	Milton Keynes	52.03°N 00.73°W	SP8738
Oakgrove	Cheshire	53.21°N 02.13°W	SJ9169
Oakham	Sandwell	52.49°N 02.06°W	SO9689
Oakham	Rutland	52.67°N 00.74°W	SK8509
Oakhanger	Hampshire	51.10°N 00.91°W	SU7635
Oakhanger	Cheshire	53.08°N 02.35°W	SJ7654
Oakhill	West Sussex	51.05°N 00.31°W	TQ1830
Oakhill	Somerset	51.22°N 02.53°W	ST6347
Oak Hill	Suffolk	52.05°N 01.44°E	TM3645
Oak Hill	City of Stoke-on-Trent	52.99°N 02.21°W	SJ8644
Oakhurst	Kent	51.22°N 00.20°E	TQ5450
Oakington	Cambridgeshire	52.25°N 00.06°E	TL4164
Oaklands	Hertfordshire	51.83°N 00.20°W	TL2417
Oaklands	Carmarthenshire)	51.82°N 04.29°W	SN4216
Oakleigh Park	Barnet	51.63°N 00.18°W	TQ2694
Oakle Street	Gloucestershire	51.85°N 02.36°W	SO7517
Oakley	Hampshire	51.24°N 01.19°W	SU5650
Oakley	Poole	50.78°N 01.98°W	SZ0198
Oakley	Suffolk	52.34°N 01.17°E	TM1677
Oakley	Bedfordshire	52.16°N 00.52°W	TL0153
Oakley	Gloucestershire	51.89°N 02.04°W	SO9722
Oakley	Buckinghamshire	51.80°N 01.08°W	SP6312
Oakley	Oxfordshire	51.69°N 00.93°W	SP7400
Oakley	Staffordshire	52.92°N 02.44°W	SJ7036
Oakley	Fife	56.07°N 03.56°W	NT0388
Oakley Green	Berkshire	51.47°N 00.67°W	SU9276
Oakley Park	Suffolk	52.34°N 01.18°E	TM1777
Oakley Wood	Oxfordshire	51.58°N 01.07°W	SU6488
Oakmere	Cheshire	53.21°N 02.64°W	SJ5769
Oakridge	Gloucestershire	51.72°N 02.13°W	SO9103
Oakridge	Hampshire	51.27°N 01.09°W	SU6353
Oaks	Shropshire	52.63°N 02.85°W	SJ4204
Oaksey	Wiltshire	51.63°N 02.01°W	ST9993
Oaks Green	Derbyshire	52.89°N 01.77°W	SK1533
Oakshaw Ford	Cumbria	55.07°N 02.76°W	NY5176
Oakshott	Hampshire	51.03°N 00.96°W	SU7327
Oaks in Charnwood	Leicestershire	52.73°N 01.30°W	SK4716
Oakthorpe	Leicestershire	52.71°N 01.52°W	SK3213
Oak Tree	Darlington	54.51°N 01.46°W	NZ3513
Oakwell	Kirklees	53.73°N 01.68°W	SE2127
Oakwood	Enfield	51.63°N 00.13°W	TQ2995
Oakwood	Northumberland	54.98°N 02.09°W	NY9465
Oakwood	Leeds	53.81°N 01.51°W	SE3236
Oakwood	Cheshire	53.41°N 02.52°W	SJ6591
Oakwood	City of Derby	52.93°N 01.43°W	SK3838
Oakwoodhill / Okewood Hill	Surrey	51.12°N 00.38°W	TQ1337
Oakworth	Bradford	53.83°N 01.95°W	SE0338
Oape	Highland	57.96°N 04.62°W	NC4500
Oare	Somerset	51.20°N 03.71°W	SS8047
Oare	Berkshire	51.46°N 01.28°W	SU5074
Oare	Kent	51.32°N 00.86°E	TR0062
Oare	Wiltshire	51.36°N 01.78°W	SU1563
Oareford	Somerset	51.20°N 03.70°W	SS8146
Oasby	Lincolnshire	52.93°N 00.51°W	TF0039
Oath	Somerset	51.03°N 02.88°W	ST3827
Oathill	Dorset	50.84°N 02.85°W	ST4005
Oathlaw	Angus	56.69°N 02.86°W	NO4756
Oatlands	North Yorkshire	53.97°N 01.54°W	SE3053
Oatlands	City of Glasgow	55.84°N 04.25°W	NS5963
Oatlands Park	Surrey	51.36°N 00.43°W	TQ0964

== Ob ==
Location	Locality	Coordinates (links to map & photo sources)	OS grid reference
Oban	Western Isles	57.89°N 06.79°W	NB1600
Oban	Argyll and Bute	56.41°N 05.47°W	NM8630
Oban Seil	Argyll and Bute	56.30°N 05.60°W	NM7718
Obley	Shropshire	52.38°N 03.00°W	SO3277
Oborne	Dorset	50.96°N 02.49°W	ST6518
Obsdale Park	Highland	57.69°N 04.23°W	NH6769
Obthorpe Lodge	Lincolnshire	52.72°N 00.37°W	TF1015

== Oc ==
Location	Locality	Coordinates (links to map & photo sources)	OS grid reference
Occlestone Green	Cheshire	53.15°N 02.46°W	SJ6962
Occold	Suffolk	52.28°N 01.15°E	TM1570
Ochr-y-foel	Sir Ddinbych (Denbighshire)	53.29°N 03.42°W	SJ0578
Ochtermuthill	Perth and Kinross	56.32°N 03.89°W	NN8316
Ochtertyre	Perth and Kinross	56.38°N 03.89°W	NN8323
Ockbrook	Derbyshire	52.92°N 01.37°W	SK4236
Ocker Hill	Sandwell	52.53°N 02.04°W	SO9793
Ockeridge	Worcestershire	52.25°N 02.33°W	SO7762
Ockford Ridge	Surrey	51.16°N 00.64°W	SU9542
Ockham	Surrey	51.29°N 00.46°W	TQ0756
Ockle	Highland	56.75°N 06.01°W	NM5570
Ockley	Surrey	51.14°N 00.37°W	TQ1440
Ocle Pychard	Herefordshire	52.11°N 02.60°W	SO5946
Octon	East Riding of Yorkshire	54.11°N 00.42°W	TA0369

== Od ==
Location	Locality	Coordinates (links to map & photo sources)	OS grid reference
Odam Barton	Devon	50.95°N 03.79°W	SS7419
Odcombe	Somerset	50.93°N 02.71°W	ST5015
Odd Down	Bath and North East Somerset	51.35°N 02.38°W	ST7362
Oddingley	Worcestershire	52.22°N 02.14°W	SO9059
Oddington	Oxfordshire	51.82°N 01.20°W	SP5514
Odell	Bedfordshire	52.20°N 00.59°W	SP9657
Odham	Devon	50.79°N 04.17°W	SS4702
Odiham	Hampshire	51.25°N 00.94°W	SU7451
Odness	Orkney Islands	59.12°N 02.54°W	HY687262
Odsal	Bradford	53.75°N 01.77°W	SE1529
Odsey	Cambridgeshire	52.02°N 00.12°W	TL2938
Odstock	Wiltshire	51.03°N 01.80°W	SU1426
Odstone	Leicestershire	52.65°N 01.42°W	SK3907
