= Gurney Slade =

Gurney Slade may refer to:

- Gurney Slade, Somerset, a rural district in the Mendips, Somerset, United Kingdom
- Gurney Slade quarry, a quarry in the area
- Gurney Slade (writer), the pen name of the children's writer Stephen Bartlett (1886–1956)
- The Strange World of Gurney Slade (1960), a British television series
- Mr Gurney and Mr Slade, a book by Warwick Deeping
