= Oakfield =

Oakfield may refer to:

== Places ==
=== United Kingdom ===
- Oakfield, Hertfordshire, in the List of United Kingdom locations: Oa-Od
- Oakfield, Isle of Wight
- Oakfield, Wales, in the List of United Kingdom locations: Oa-Od
- Oakfield, Wolverhampton, in the List of areas in Wolverhampton
- Oakfield, County Fermanagh, in the List of townlands in County Fermanagh, Northern Ireland

=== United States ===
- Oakfield, Georgia
- Oakfield, Iowa
- Oakfield, Maine, a New England town
  - Oakfield (CDP), Maine, the village in the town
- Oakfield Township, Michigan
- Oakfield (town), New York
  - Oakfield (village), New York
- Oakfield, Ohio, an unincorporated community
- Oakfield (town), Wisconsin
  - Oakfield, Wisconsin, a village

=== Elsewhere ===
- Oakfield, Nova Scotia, Canada

== Schools ==
- Oakfield High School (disambiguation)

=== England ===
- Oakfield School (Swindon), Wiltshire
- Oakfield Park School, Ackworth, West Yorkshire
- Oakfield Preparatory School, Dulwich, London
- Oakfield High School and College, Hindley, Wigan

== Other uses ==
- Oakfield; or, Fellowship in the East, an 1853 novel by William Arnold
