= Church of the Holy Trinity, Binegar =

Church in Somerset, England

Church of the Holy Trinity
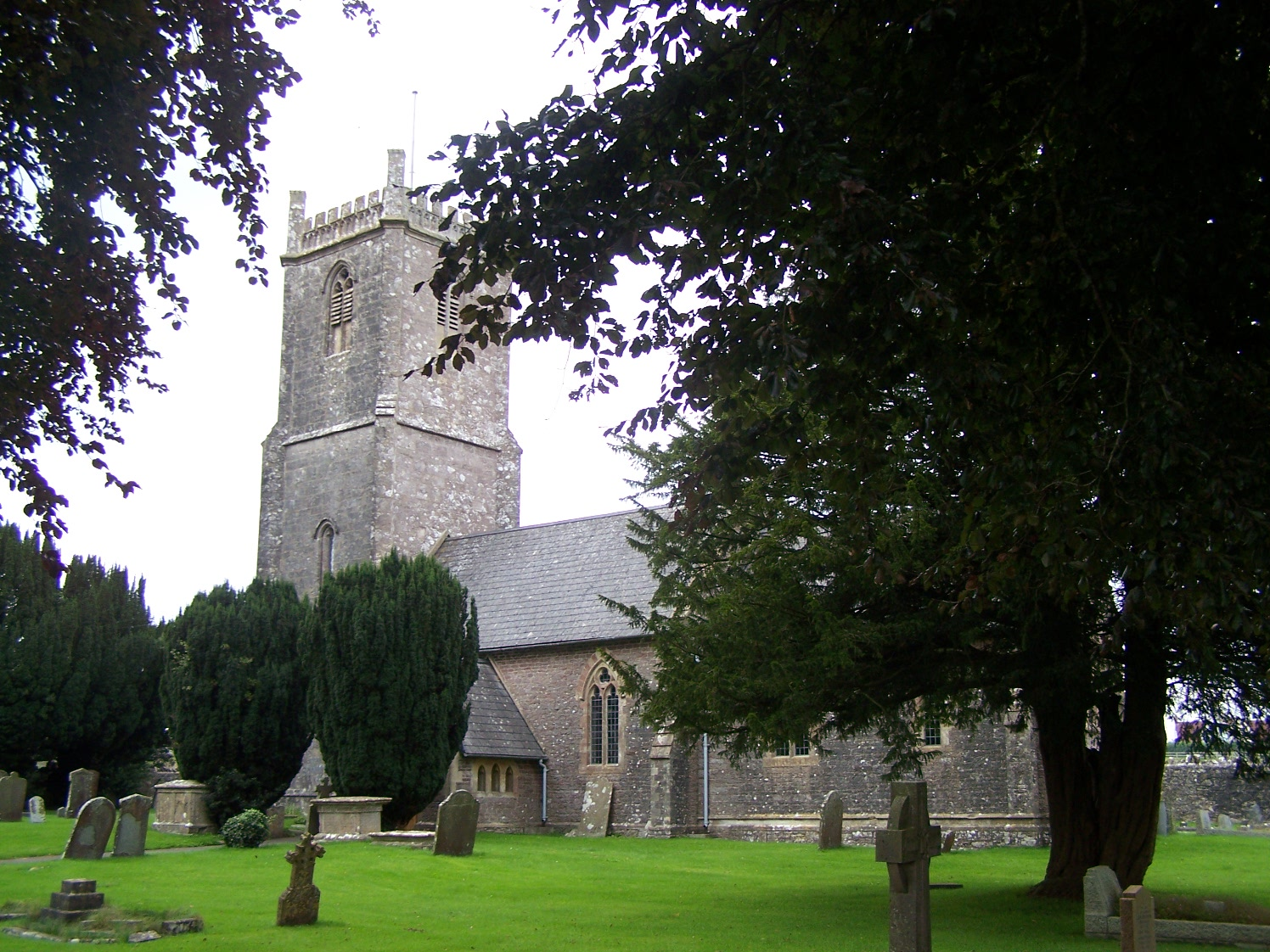

- Location within Somerset
- 51.2430°N 2.5523°W
- Location: Binegar, Somerset, England

History
- Built: Norman

Listed Building – Grade II*
- Official name: Church of the Holy Trinity
- Designated: 2 June 1961
- Reference no.: 1058641

The Anglican Church of the Holy Trinity, Binegar, Somerset, England is Norman but has been rebuilt and restored several times since. It is a Grade II* listed building.

== History ==
The original church was Norman however it was largely rebuilt in the 15th century with just the original tower remaining. A Victorian restoration was carried out in 1858.

The need for ongoing maintenance of the joists of the floor and slates on the roof mean the building has been added to the Heritage at Risk Register.

The parish is part of the benefice of Ashwick with Oakhill and Binegar, which is within the Diocese of Bath and Wells.

== Architecture ==
The stone building has an asbestos slate roof. It consists of a three-bay nave, two-bay chancel and north transept, with an organ chamber, vestry and porch. The three-stage tower is supported by diagonal buttresses. In 1937 three new bells were added in the tower.

Inside the church is a 15th-century font and Jacobean altar table. There is a white marble tablet in the church which is a memorial to men from Binegar who died in World War I and a second for the fatalities of World War II.

== See also ==
- List of ecclesiastical parishes in the Diocese of Bath and Wells
