= Oakhill (disambiguation) =

Oakhill is a village in Somerset, England.

Oakhill may also refer to:

== United Kingdom ==
- Oakhill School, Whalley, rural Lancashire, England
- Oakhill Brewery, in Oakhill, Somerset, England
- Oakhill Primary School, Stoke-on-Trent, Staffordshire, England
- Oakhill Down Lock, Wiltshire, England

== United States ==
- Oakhill (Marshall, Michigan), a house listed on the U.S. National Register of Historic Places
- Oak Hill, New Jersey, United States, also known as Oakhill
- Oakhill Township, Barnes County, North Dakota, United States

== Elsewhere ==
- Oakhill College, Australia
- Oakhill Forest, Ontario, Canada

== See also ==
- Oak Hill (disambiguation)
