= Ashwick House =

Ashwick House is the name of two houses in Somerset, England:

- Ashwick Court, near Shepton Mallet
- Ashwick House, Dulverton
