= Oakfield Township =

Oakfield Township may refer to the following places in the United States:

- Oakfield Township, Audubon County, Iowa
- Oakfield Township, Michigan

== See also ==
- Oakfield (disambiguation)
