= Oak Hill Historic District =

Oak Hill Historic District may refer to:
(sorted by state, then city/town)

- Oak Hill Historic District (Oak Hill, Alabama), listed on the National Register of Historic Places (NRHP) in Wilcox County, Alabama
- Oak Hill Historic District (Fort Dodge, Iowa), listed on the NRHP in Webster County, Iowa
- Oak Hill Historic District (Hagerstown, Maryland), listed on the NRHP in Washington County, Maryland
- Oak Hill Historic District (Oak Hill, New York), listed on the NRHP in Greene County, New York
- Oak Hill Historic District (St. Louis, Missouri), listed on the NRHP in St. Louis County, Missouri
- Oak Hill Park Historic District, Olean, NY, listed on the NRHP in Cattaraugus County, New York

== See also ==
- Oak Hill (disambiguation)
- Oak Hill Cemetery (disambiguation)
