= Oak Hills =

Oak Hills may refer to:

== Places ==
In the United States:

- Oak Hills, Monterey County, California
- Oak Hills, San Bernardino County, California
- Oak Hills, Iowa
- Oak Hills, Oregon
- Oak Hills, Pennsylvania

== Schools ==
- Oak Hills High School, Oak Hills, San Bernardino County, California; see Hesperia Unified School District
- Oak Hills High School, in Cincinnati, Ohio
- Oak Hills Local School District, in Cincinnati, Ohio

== See also ==
- Oak Hill (disambiguation)
