= Church of St James, Ashwick =

Church in Somerset, England

Church of St James
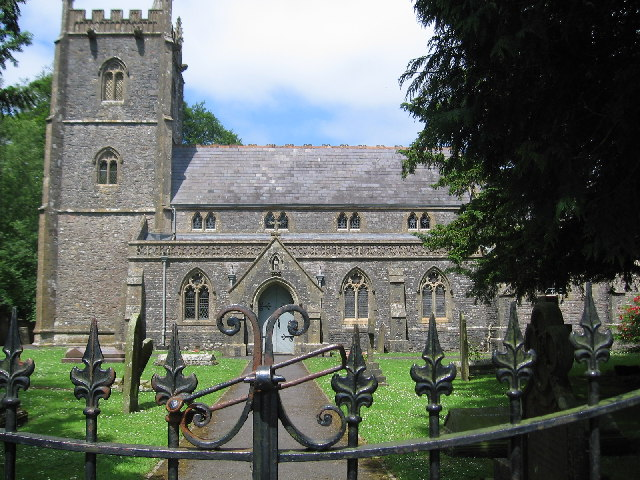

- Location within Somerset

General information
- Location: Ashwick, England
- Coordinates: 51.2338°N 2.5211°W
- Completed: 1881

The Church of St James in Ashwick, Somerset, England, is a church dating from 1881. It is a Grade I listed building, adjacent to Ashwick Court. It also houses a tower that dates back from 1450.

The Victorian gothic building was erected between 1876 and 1881 by Browne and Gill of Bath. However, the church tower dates back to 1463.

The earliest record of a church on the site is 1413, when Bishop Bubwith dedicated a churchyard at Ashwick and authorised burials to take place there, but it is not known when the church was first built. The church was originally a chapel of ease connected to the vicarage at Kilmersdon, near Radstock. It remained so until the formation of Ashwick parish. The benefice of Oakhill was added in 1923 and Binegar was added in 1969, since when one rector has overseen all three villages.

At the west end of the aisles in the Church of St James two memorial tablets can be seen. These are dedicated to John Billingsley, his wife Mary, and their family. The writer of the 1794 Survey of Somerset, Billingsley was a leading agriculturalist who was one of the founders of the Bath and West Society, known today as the Royal Bath and West of England Society.

The churchyard extension contains a war grave of a World War II Home Guard officer.

== See also ==
- List of ecclesiastical parishes in the Diocese of Bath and Wells
