= Oakfield High School =

Oakfield High School may refer to:

- Oakfield High School (Maine), Oakfield, Maine, US
- Oakfield High School (New York), Oakfield, New York, US; See Frank Trigilio
- Oakfield High School (Wisconsin), Oakfield, Wisconsin, US; See List of high schools in Wisconsin
- Oakfield High School and College, Wigan, England

== See also ==
- Oakfield (disambiguation)#Schools
