= Red Causey =

American baseball player (1893-1960)

- Pitcher
- Born: August 11, 1893; Georgetown, Florida, U.S.
- Died: November 11, 1960 (aged 67); Avon Park, Florida, U.S.
- Batted: Right Threw: Right

MLB debut
- April 26, 1918, for the New York Giants

Last MLB appearance
- July 29, 1922, for the New York Giants

MLB statistics
- Win–loss record: 39–35
- Earned run average: 3.59
- Strikeouts: 139
- Stats at Baseball Reference

Teams
- New York Giants (1918–1919); Boston Braves (1919); Philadelphia Phillies (1920–1921); New York Giants (1921–1922)

Cecil Algerton "Red" Causey (August 11, 1893 – November 11, 1960) was an American right-handed Major League Baseball (MLB) pitcher who played from 1918 to 1922.

Prior to playing professionally, he attended Georgetown High School.

== Minor league career ==
He began his professional career in 1914 with the Savannah Colts. In 32 games with them, he went 18–11. The following season, he went 16–20 for the Portsmouth Truckers (9-6) and Savannah Colts (7-14). In 1916, Causey went 19–10 in 38 games with the Waco Navigators, and in 1917 he went 17–13 with a 2.40 ERA in 39 games for the Rochester Red Wings.

== Major league career ==
Causey made his big league debut on April 26, 1918 with the New York Giants. That year, he went 11–6 with a 2.79 ERA in 29 games (18 starts). He began the 1919 campaign with the Giants, going 9–3 with a 3.69 ERA with them. On August 1, he was traded with Johnny Jones, Mickey O'Neil, Joe Oeschger and $55,000 to the Boston Braves for Art Nehf. He went 4–5 with a 4.57 ERA in 10 games for the Braves. Overall, he went 13–8 with a 4.03 ERA in 29 games in 1919.

In an unknown transaction, Causey wound up with the Philadelphia Phillies for the 1920 season. With them, he went 7–14 with a 4.32 ERA in 35 games. He began 1921 with the Phillies, going 3–3 with a 2.84 ERA with them, but on July 10, he was traded to the Giants for John Monroe and Jesse Winters. He went 1–1 with a 2.45 ERA for the Giants. Overall, he went 4–4 with a 2.76 ERA in 1921.

Causey played his final season in 1922, going 4–3 with a 3.18 ERA in 24 games with the Giants. His final game was July 29, 1922. He also spent 11 games with the minor league Indianapolis Indians in 1922, going 3–7 with a 4.27 ERA with them.

Overall, Causey went 39–35 with a 3.59 ERA in five major league seasons. In five minor league seasons, he went 73–61.

Following his death, he was buried at Oak Hill Cemetery in Lake Placid, Florida.
