= Frank Green =

British industrialist (1861–1954)

- Born: Francis William Green; 24 November 1861; Chorlton-cum-Hardy, England
- Died: 20 March 1954 (aged 92); Ashwick, England
- Resting place: St Helen's Church, Sandal Magna, England
- Education: Eton College; University of Oxford
- Occupation: Businessman
- Parent(s): Sir Edward Green, 1st Baronet; Mary Lycett

Francis William Green (24 November 1861 – 20 March 1954) was an English industrialist.

== Early life ==
Frank Green was born in Chorlton-cum-Hardy on 24 November 1861. He was the second son of Sir Edward Green, 1st Baronet, a Yorkshire industrialist and Mary Lycett. His elder brother Edward Lycett Green was born in 1860 and became the second baronet after his father died. The father, Sir Edward, was created a baronet for services to politics and was at one time MP for Wakefield. Frank Green's grandfather Edward Green had invented, and patented in 1845, a fuel economiser which was successful during the 19th and 20th centuries and which made the family fortune. Green was educated at Eton College and then the University of Oxford but did not graduate. Green displayed a volatile temper from early on, once for example, striking a tutor with a cricket bat. Whilst his brother's role was to raise the family's social position, Green assisted his father in the management of the company that had factories in various countries.

== Career ==
Green travelled on company business and described his journeys in travelogues forwarded to the Wakefield press. He took over the management of the company following his father's death in 1923 and was a formidable employer. His obsession with tidiness and good order led him to inspect factory and offices for signs of mess and muddle: a typical response would be for him to empty drawers onto the floor or sweep items off desks with his cane.

The family moved to York in 1888 and lived at Nunthorpe Hall, overlooking York Racecourse – they enjoyed for horse racing and hunting. They purchased land next door to Sandringham House and created a hunting lodge (Ken Hill) and a shoot. As hoped, the then Prince of Wales Albert Edward (Bertie) became their first visitor, establishing the Greens' connections to the Prince and the Marlborough House set.

Green purchased three-fifths of a York property adjacent to York Minster in 1897–8 and commissioned architect Temple Lushington Moore to oversee alterations and restoration. Green called the result Treasurer's House and it was a showcase for his collection of objet d'arts and antique furniture. Green was an antiquarian and tried to create period rooms where the furniture and artefacts reflected a style or age, for example, a drawing room of the Georgian style or a medieval Great Hall.

Green became an honorary lieutenant colonel of the Queen's Own Yorkshire Dragoons in 1906. He and the Green family were philanthropists in Wakefield, Norfolk and York, donating to many causes and public works, including York Minster. Green was a member of a number of historical and intellectual societies. He travelled around Europe in his Rolls-Royce cars (he had several) for leisure, and for purchasing items for his collection.

Green bought a number of properties in York and in other parts of the country – his aim being to restore and renovate. One such property was St William's College in York, and Temple Moore restored this also. Green then sold St William's to the church for the price he paid for it.

Public endorsement of the Greens came when the Prince of Wales, Princess Alexandra and their daughter Princess Victoria stayed as Frank Green's guests at Treasurer's House for three days in 1900.

== Collections ==
Green was a significant collector although he bought to furnish his houses, rather than for investment. He did not, for example, collect contemporary works. He was also happy to lend or donate items to museums, for example, around 400 items to Wakefield Museum and around 50 items to the Victoria and Albert Museum, London. He embraced what he called "folk art" including textiles, embroidery, craft work, rather than paintings and his art collection in Treasurer's House is not of huge overall merit. Nevertheless, his collection contains a number of significant pieces and items of interest.

In 1928 Green purchased land in Somerset near Exmoor and decided to move south for his health. He gave Treasurer's House, other York properties and his collection to the National Trust in 1930, providing the Trust with its first fully furnished property.

== Personal life ==
Green never married but was not reclusive. He loved to entertain and enjoyed especially the company of actors and musicians including Ellen Terry. In York he organised events and society balls, for example the York Bachelors' Ball, and guests were entertained lavishly. At Treasurer's his footmen would be dressed as bewigged pageboys to serve guests from gold plate. He was himself a fastidious dresser, changing his clothes at least three times a day. His trademark outfit was a bowler hat and a hand-tied bow tie, but he also favoured frilled shirts and capes. When visiting abroad he purchased examples of national costume.

Frank Green's often ill temper remained with him as he grew older and his strict orders regarding cleanliness and hygiene had to be obeyed to the letter. Staff had to meet exacting standards governed by his personal inspections of the kitchens and other rooms. He visited the kitchens at night to check that cutlery was stored correctly. Pieces of coal had to be wrapped individually before putting in the fireplace. Once, when a fly was seen in the kitchen, Green ordered all food in the house to be immediately destroyed. He is most famous for the metal studs placed in the floor of Treasurer's House to indicate precisely where a table or chair leg had to be.

After Green's move to Somerset and the Ashwick estate, he joined the local hunts and other society activities. His last home was Greenways in the village of Dulverton. Green was instrumental in saving the herd of Exmoor ponies during World War II. To provide entertainment for the staff, a miniature theatre was constructed in the grounds.

Green died at his home in Ashwick on 20 March 1954, and is buried in the family churchyard at St Helen's Church in Sandal Magna near Wakefield.

Treasurer's House, York remains in the stewardship of the National Trust.
