= Ashwick House, Dulverton =

House near Dulverton, Somerset, England

Ashwick House
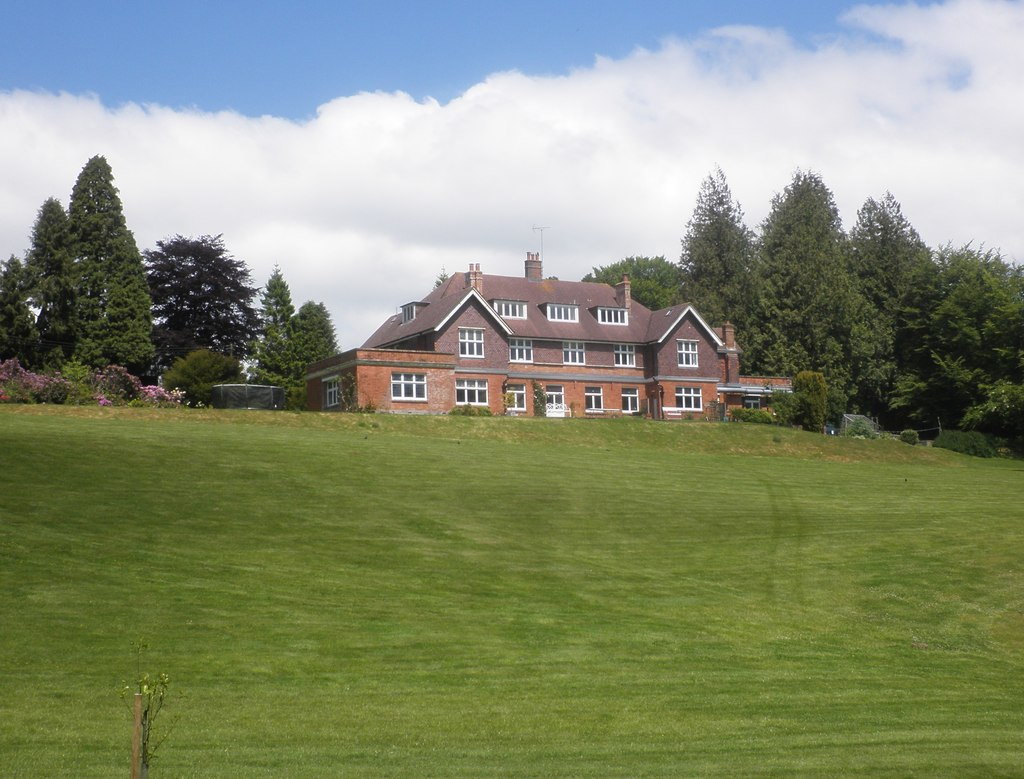

- Location within Somerset

General information
- Location: Ashwick, Somerset, England
- Coordinates: 51.0644°N 3.5868°W
- Completed: 1901

not to be confused with the 17th century Ashwick Court in eastern Somerset.

Ashwick House is an Edwardian mansion in Ashwick, four miles northwest of Dulverton, Exmoor, Somerset, England.

The house is located on a hillside overlooking the Barle Valley. It was built in 1901 by a Bristolian businessman as a hunting retreat. It sits in six acres of sprawling gardens and looks across the hills to the Bristol Channel. The house has six bedrooms, each named after trees and individually decorated. The "Ash Room" is decorated in shades of pink and green, matching the stained-glass window.

In 1928 Frank Green purchased Ashwick House. He moved to Exmoor in 1930 and took as active interest in running the Ashwick Estate, which extended to several hundred acres of farmland. In those days 20 resident staff ran the house and it was regularly used for lavish entertaining. To provide for entertainment of the staff, a miniature theatre (sometimes known as the music room) was constructed in the grounds. Standing on stone pillars. The auditorium is 30 feet (9.1 m) long and 15 feet (4.6 m) wide with a wooden dance floor. The stage is 8 feet (2.4 m) deep with a proscenium arch 10 feet (3.0 m) wide. The wings have trompe-l'œil paintings on canvas of Edward VII and Queen Alexandra on one side and politicians including H. H. Asquith, Bonar Law and Austen Chamberlain on the other. The building has been taken over by the Moorland Mousie Trust and is being restored to serve as a heritage information centre.

From 1980 the house was run as a hotel but according to its official site it is now closed to the public.
