= John Billingsley (agriculturist) =

English agriculturist (1747–1811)

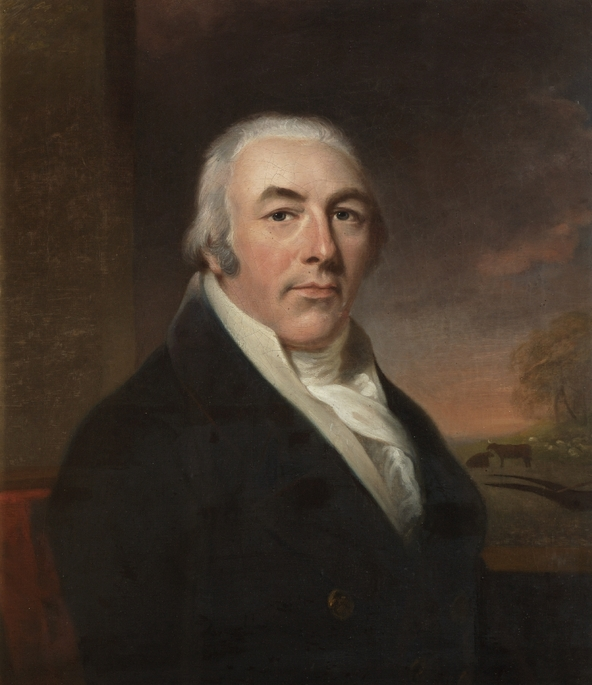
- Painting of John Billingsley (1747–1811) painted by Joseph Hutchinson (1747–1830). Oil on canvas, 63.5 x 53.4 cm
- Born: 1747; Ashwick, Somerset
- Died: 26 September 1811; Ashwick, Somerset
- Occupation: Agricultural pioneer
- Known for: 1795 survey of agriculture in Somerset

John Billingsley (1747–1811) was an agricultural pioneer in 18th-century Somerset, England.

The writer of the 1794 Survey of Somerset, Billingsley, was a leading agriculturalist who was one of the founders of the Bath and West Society, known today as the Royal Bath and West of England Society. He lived all his life at Ashwick Grove.

== Family life ==
John Billingsley was born in 1747, the grandson of Nicholas Billingsley, a Presbyterian dissenter who was minister at Ashwick from 1699 to 1729. Little is known about his early life. But by 1782, he was listed as Brewer along with James Jordan of the Oakhill Brewery in the neighbouring village of Oakhill, and may have been involved in the wool trade before that.

He was described as a leading member of the Presbyterian church, although at some stage he was reconciled with the Church of England.

== General View of the Agriculture of the County of Somerset ==
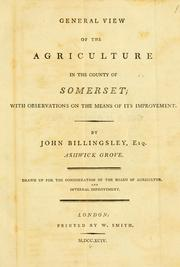
Cover of the book: General view of the agriculture in the county of Somerset with observations on the means of its improvement by John Billingsley ... Drawn up for the consideration of the Board of Agriculture and Internal Improvement. Published 1794. Printed by W. Smith in London.

The 18th century was largely one of peace in Somerset, but the Industrial Revolution in the Midlands and Northern England spelled the end for most of Somerset's cottage industries. Farming continued to flourish however, with Billingsley farming about 4,000 acres (16 km^{2}), and the Bath and West of England Society for the Encouragement of Agriculture, Arts, Manufactures and Commerce was founded in 1777 to improve farming methods. Despite this, 20 years later John Billingsley conducted a survey, for the Board of Agriculture, of the county's agriculture in 1795 and found that agricultural methods could still be improved. He provided estimates, based on his local knowledge, of the land use of the one million acres (4,000 km^{2}) in the county. He suggested that 584,500 were enclosed meadow and pasture land, 260,000 were enclosed arable and convertible land, with smaller areas for other purposes. 65,000 acres (260 km^{2}) were considered uncultivated wastes.

It advocated ways of modernising farming practices, particularly through mechanisation, which included instructions for hedge building and crop rotation (also how to treat sick animals with hay tea and improve cucumber production with horse dung!). It also includes a chapter on political economy related to the narrow margin of British food supplies, in view of the outbreak of war with France in 1793, and mentions developments on the Somerset coalfield.

His General View of the Agriculture of the County of Somerset divided the county into three districts- north-east, middle, and south-west. It included proposals for the enclosure of Exmoor and the building of a village at Simonsbath. For the middle section, the plans he advocated improved drainage, including the straightening of sections of the rivers Brue, Axe, and Parrett, which were more successful and led to some significant reclamation of the Somerset Levels. He also deplored the failure of many farmers to manure the land, exhausting it by constant cropping and overstocking.

In 1798, he wrote about the water-meadows of the Brendon and Quantock Hills, describing them as the best in the country.

== Other activities ==
Billingsley was also actively involved in turnpike trusts, and canal building, including the Kennet and Avon Canal, Somerset Coal Canal and the Dorset and Somerset Canal. One eulogy by Sir Benjamin Hobhouse, President of the Bath and West Society, exaggerates considerably, referring to him as having "drained Sedgemoor and enclosed Mendip"!

Because of the moribund state of the lead mines in the Mendip Hills, he proposed to drive a 5 miles (8 km) level from Compton Martin to Wookey Hole at a depth of 450 feet (137 m) below the surface to remove the water which was flooding the mines – nothing came of this plan.

He was also responsible for the introduction and adoption of the double-furrow plough.

Atthill considers that his greatest achievement was the enclosure of the Mendip Hills. The first Mendip commons to be enclosed were those in the parishes of East and West Cranmore, which had been completed by 1769. By 1794, Billingsley estimated that 13,600 acres (55 km^{2}) had been enclosed by Dry stone walls, leaving 11,550 unenclosed.

== Memorials ==
At the west end of the aisles in the Church of St James, Ashwick two memorial tablets can be seen. These are dedicated to John Billingsley, his wife Mary, and their family.

Soon after his death the Bath and West Society commissioned Samuel Woodforde (the nephew of James Woodforde) to copy in oils a crayon portrait of Billingsly. Another portrait by Joseph Hutchinson now hangs in the Victoria Art Gallery in Bath.
