= Elaine Hamill =

New Zealand actress

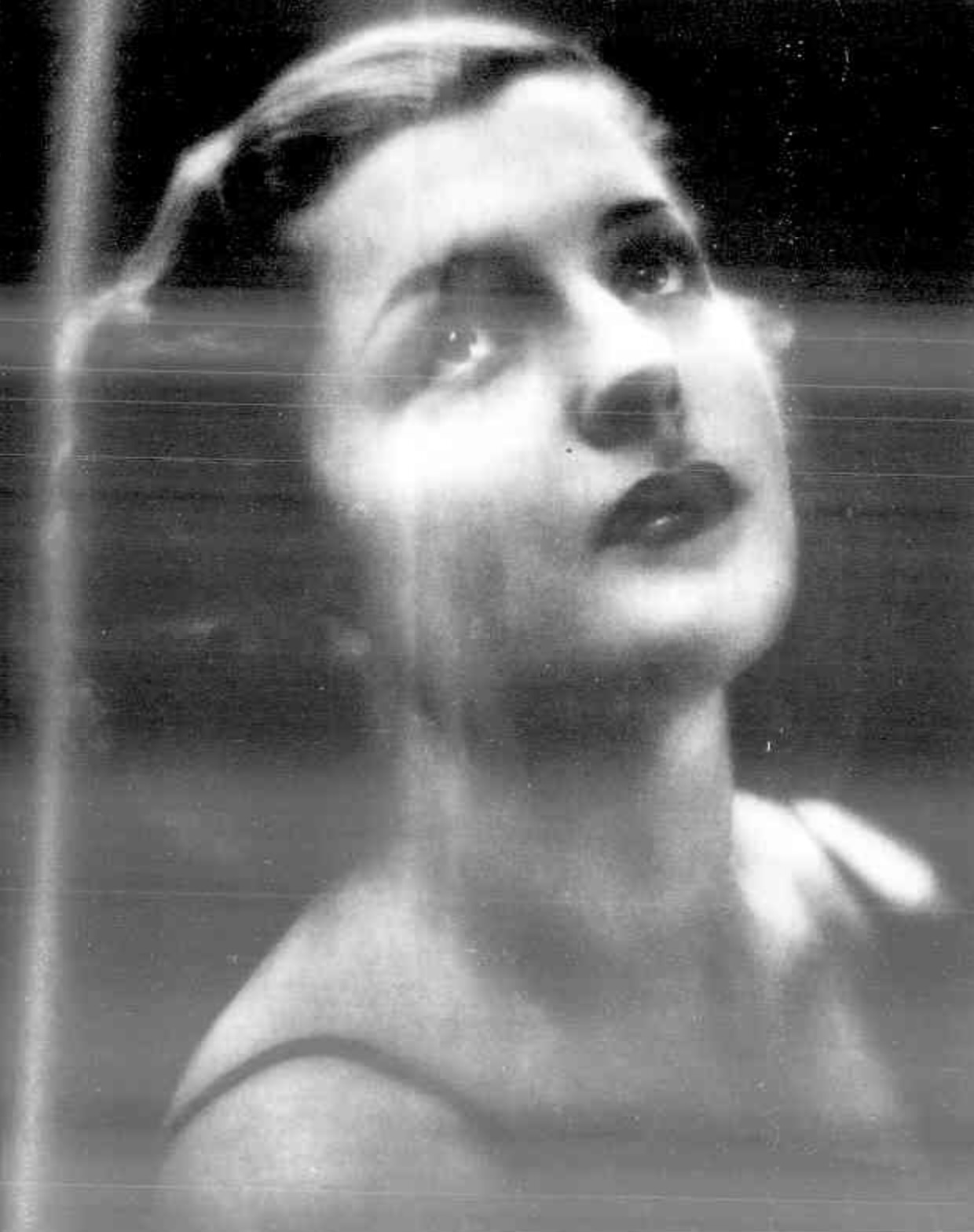
Hamill in 1935

Elaine Hamill (1911–1981) was a New Zealand actress who appeared on stage and in films in the 1930s.

Born in Hamilton, New Zealand she studied as a nurse, surviving the Nelson earthquake of 1931. She tried out unsuccessfully for Paramount's Search for Beauty competition in 1933, and then moved to Australia in February 1934 to pursue a modelling and acting career. In 1934, after winning the Cinesound Australian Personality Contest, she was offered a leading role in Grandad Rudd. She appeared in Cinesound’s film Thoroughbred in 1936, in addition to taking some stage roles for J.C. Williamson. In mid 1936 she spent several months on tour in New Zealand – appearing in The Shining Hour and Fresh Fields.

Following a return to Sydney and another film for Cinesound – Lovers and Luggers, she moved to London, where she modelled and appeared on stage and in radio dramas. She took a small role in Associated British Films’ The Outsider, featuring George Sanders and Australian Mary Maguire. In 1940 she was active in the Dundee Repertory Theatre, but retired after marrying Dundee businessman Murray Campbell Scarlett in September 1941. She died in Dundee, Scotland, in 1981.

== Select credits ==
- Splendid Fellows (1934)
- Blue Mountain Melody (1934) — stage play
- Niobe (1934) — radio play
- Let's Go Dancing (1935) — radio musical
- Roberta (1935) — stage musical
- The Shining Hour (1935) — stage play
- Grandad Rudd (1935) — film
- Thoroughbred (1936) — film
- Lovers and Luggers (1937) — film
- The Outsider (1939) — film
