= Treasurer's House, York =

Grade I listed building in York, England

Treasurer's House
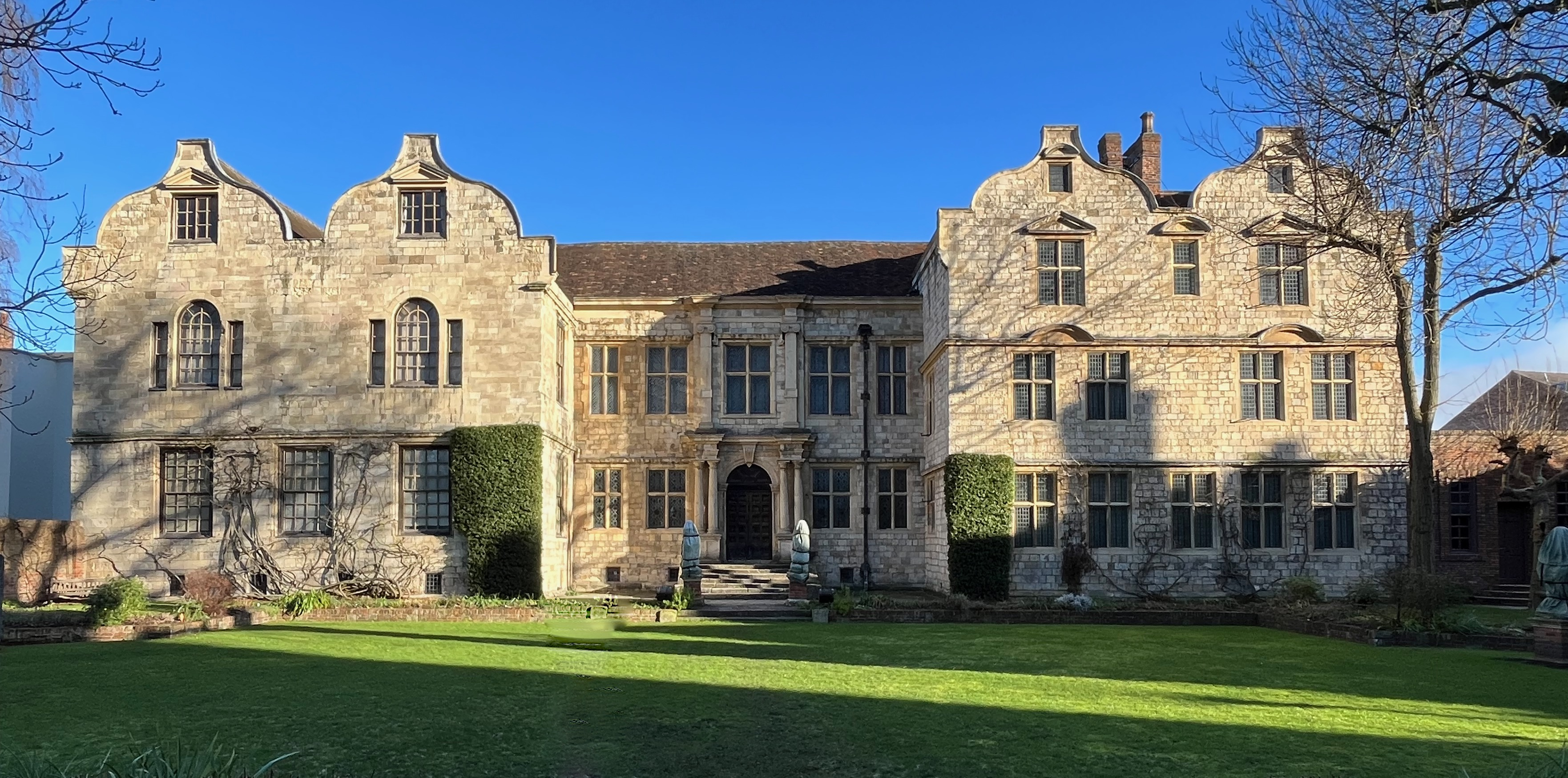
- The building in 2023
- Location: Minster Yard, York, England
- Coordinates: 53.9630°N 1.0808°W (grid reference SE6052)
- Type: Historic house museum
- Founder: Frank Green
- Director: David Morgan
- Architects: Temple Moore, others
- Owner: National Trust
- Public transit access: York Station 0.7 mi (1.1 km)
- Website: nationaltrust.org.uk/treasurers-house-york

Listed Building – Grade I
- Official name: Treasurer's House and attached garden walls, gate and gate piers
- Designated: 14 June 1954
- Reference no.: 1257251

Scheduled monument
- Official name: York Minster cathedral precinct: including Bootham Bar and the length of City Walls extending round the precinct up to Monk Bar
- Designated: 8 October 1937
- Reference no.: 1017777

The Treasurer's House in York, North Yorkshire, England, is a Grade I listed historic house owned by the National Trust, who also maintain its garden. It is located in Minster Yard, directly to the north of York Minster.

== History ==
The first Treasurer for York Minster was appointed in 1091 when the office was established by Archbishop of York Thomas of Bayeux, but all that remains of his original house is an external wall which forms part of Grays Court and sections of 12th-century masonry in the present Treasurer's House for which it is uncertain whether they are in-situ or have been reused. As the controller of the finances of the Minster the Treasurer required a grand residence to be able to entertain important guests.

The residence served in this capacity until 1547, when the Reformation of the English Church brought the job of Treasurer to an end. The last Treasurer surrendered the house to the crown on 26 May and it was granted to Protector Somerset by whom it was sold to Archbishop Robert Holgate. Thomas Young, Archbishop between 1561 and 1568, and his descendants are responsible for the structure of house as it is today. In the early 17th century the Young family added the symmetrical front and almost entirely rebuilt the house. In 1617, the Treasurer's House played host to royalty when Sir George Young entertained James I. The house then passed through a number of private owners including Lord Fairfax and over time was sub-divided into separate tenements.

The house was restored to its present state by Frank Green, a wealthy local industrialist, who between 1897 and 1898 bought each part of the house. He appointed Temple Moore to restore the house and remove numerous earlier additions. This work was mostly completed by 1900 before Prince Albert Edward, Princess Alexandra of Denmark and Princess Victoria visited in June the same year. When Frank Green retired and moved away from York in 1930 the house and its contents were given to the National Trust. This marked the first time both a private home and its original furnishings had ever been given to the Trust.

The house was built directly over one of the main Roman roads leading out of Roman York to the North. During major structural changes, carried out by Green, four Roman column bases were uncovered, one of which remains in-situ in the cellar.

== Public access ==
Treasurer's House is open to the public for an admission fee, and free to members of the National Trust. The garden and Below Stairs Café are free to enter. Cellar and attic tours are available, depending on the time of year.

== Roman soldiers apparition ==
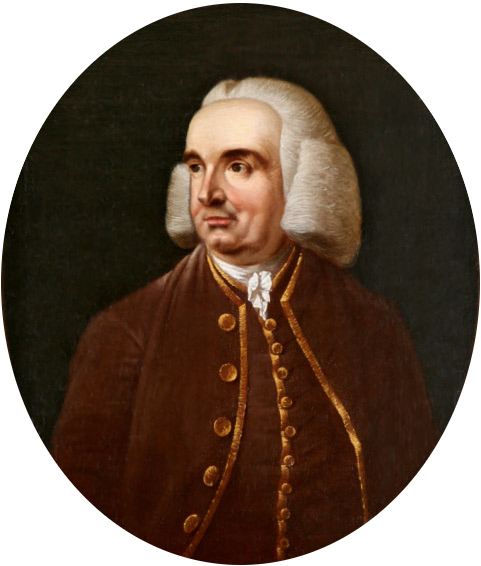
Portrait of the antiquary Francis Drake, on display at the Treasurer's House

Several ghosts reportedly haunt the house, including that of George Aislaby, who owned the property in the 17th century. However, the most notable haunting is by a group of Roman soldiers, who have been witnessed in the cellar, firstly by a party guest of Frank Green and then many years later during restoration works carried out by the National Trust. In 1953, local 18-year-old apprentice plumber Harry Martindale was repairing pipe work in the cellar, the National Trust having decided to remove the coal-fired central heating installed by Green. After about four hours of work at the top of his ladder, Martindale became aware of a musical sound, resembling a series of repeated single trumpet-like notes. The sound grew in intensity until, just below his ladder, Martindale reported that he saw a soldier, wearing a plumed helmet, emerge from the wall, followed by a cart horse and about nine or ten pairs of other Roman soldiers. Martindale fell, terrified, from his ladder and stumbled into a corner to hide. The soldiers appeared to be armed legionaries, visible only from the knees up, in a marching formation, but were "scruffy". They were distinctive in three ways: they carried round shields on their left arms, they carried some kind of daggers in scabbards on their right side and they wore green tunics. When they descended to the level of the Roman road, on which Martindale had stood his ladder, he was able to see that they wore open sandals with leather straps to the knees.

The experience so frightened Martindale that it was several weeks before he returned to his job. Many years later, excavations in the city revealed that the descriptions of the soldiers' dress given by Martindale, at first dismissed as anomalous, in fact matched those of soldiers who took over the Roman garrison in the 4th century. During the course of his long life Martindale recounted his experience many times, but never changed any of the details and always refused any payment.

The Treasurer's House was visited in the first episode of the Discovery Channel television series Ghosthunters.

== See also ==
- Grade I listed buildings in the City of York
- Listed buildings in York (within the city walls, northern part)
