= Oak Hill, Fairfax County, Virginia =

Unincorporated community in Virginia, United States

- Unincorporated community
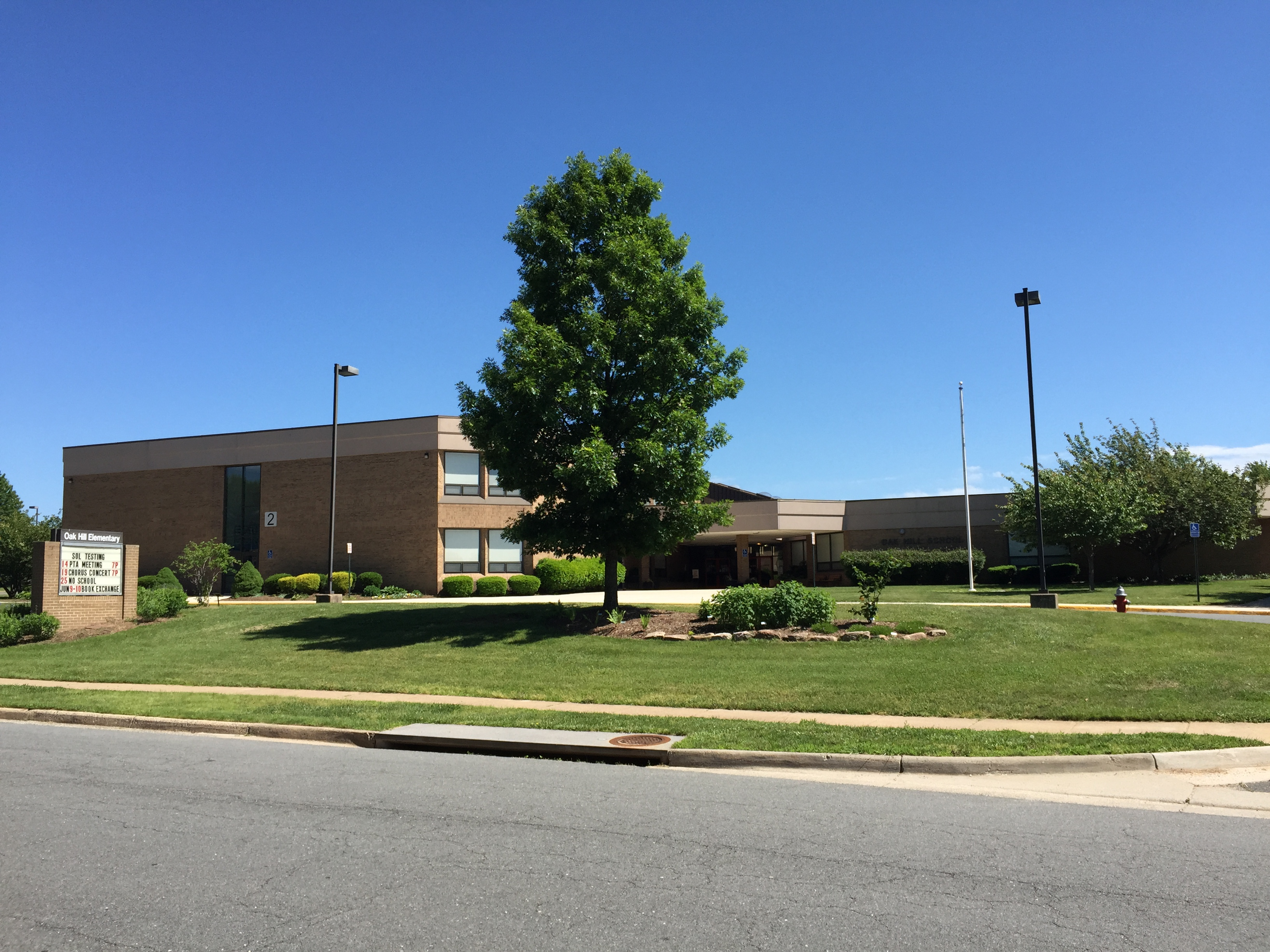
- Oak Hill Elementary School in Oak Hill, Virginia

- Location within Northern Virginia Location within Virginia Location within the United States
- Coordinates: 38°55′33″N 77°24′06″W
- Country: United States
- State: Virginia
- County: Fairfax
- Elevation: 354 ft (108 m)
- Time zone: UTC−5 (Eastern (EST))
  - Summer (DST): UTC−4 (EDT)
- ZIP code: 20171
- GNIS feature ID: 2652111

Oak Hill is a suburban unincorporated community located in Fairfax County, Virginia, United States.

== Geography ==
Oak Hill is located in Fairfax County, just east of Washington Dulles International Airport and south of the Dulles Toll and Access Roads. The town of Herndon lies immediately to the north, while the unincorporated community of Chantilly is adjacent to Oak Hill in the south. Franklin Farm, Floris and McNair are census-designated places located within the larger Oak Hill community.

As an unincorporated area, Oak Hill's boundaries are not officially defined by either a municipal government, the government of Fairfax County, or the U.S. Census Bureau. The United States Postal Service defines Oak Hill's boundaries by way of its ZIP code, 20171.

== Public facilities ==
Schools serving the Oak Hill area (but not necessarily in Oak Hill), include Oak Hill Elementary, Fox Mill Elementary, Floris Elementary, McNair Elementary, Lutie Lewis Coates Elementary, Navy Elementary, Crossfield Elementary, Franklin Middle School, Rachel Carson Middle School, Chantilly High School, South Lakes High School, Westfield High School, and Oakton High School.

The Oak Hill community is served by the Oak Hill post office. Mail may be addressed to Herndon or Oak Hill using zip code 20171.

Amenities include Frying Pan Farm Park, a working museum farm operated by Fairfax County Park Authority.

== Notable residents ==
A. Scott Crossfield was the first pilot to fly at twice the speed of sound, and lived in what is now Oak Hill (then Herndon). The local elementary school, Crossfield Elementary (Home of the Rockets!), and adjacent park were named after Crossfield in honor of his active mind, commitment to education, and contributions to aeronautical science.

Charles Burlingame, pilot of the doomed American Airlines Flight 77 aircraft which was crashed by terrorists into the Pentagon during the September 11, 2001 attacks, resided in Oak Hill before his death.

== See also ==
- Oak Hill (Annandale, Virginia)
- Oak Hill (James Monroe house)
- Oak Hill (disambiguation)

== Sources ==
- U.S. Geological Survey Geographic Names Information System: Oak Hill, Fairfax County, Virginia
- Census Bureau Statistics for Oak Hill Zip Code area
