= Robert Rummer =

American real estate developer (1927–2025)

Robert Rummer (May 26, 1927 – January 31, 2025) was an American real estate developer best known for developing distinctive residential subdivisions of mid-century modern style tract housing in Oregon.

== Life and career ==
Rummer was born in Davenport, Washington, on May 26, 1927. He built mid-century modern homes in Portland, Oregon, during the 1960s and 1970s after his wife Phyllis toured Eichler's Rancho San Miguel subdivision in Walnut Creek California in 1959. Rummer built nearly a thousand of these mid-century modern homes in and around Portland, and they have had a cult like following for some time. The National Register of Historic Places-listed historic district within the Oak Hills neighborhood, in the suburbs west of Portland, includes 29 Rummer-designed homes.

During a 2011 interview with Oregon Home, Robert Rummer distilled his architectural vision into a phrase: "houses that bring the inside out or the outside in".

Some of the floor plans include atriums, with other features like large floor to ceiling glass windows, post and beam construction (beams originally painted in Rodda Paint's Oxford Brown), vaulted ceilings in some models, galley kitchens with Thermadore stainless ovens and cooktops, radiant heat floors, and Roman baths.

In March, 2024 Rummer Development was announced. The newly-formed company is led by Aubrey McCormick.

Rummer died on January 31, 2025, at the age of 97.

== See also ==
- Joseph Eichler
- A. Quincy Jones
