= Oakhill Brewery =

Brewery in Oakhill, Somerset, England

Coordinates: 51.2233°N 2.5271°W

Oakhill Brewery was a brewery in Oakhill, Somerset, England.

== History ==
Oakhill Brewery was founded in 1767 by two young men, James Jordan and Richard Perkins. John Billingsley became a partner in 1776. In its heyday the Oakhill Brewery was a major producer, known for Oakhill Invalid Stout. In 1904, due to its volume of production – between 2,000 and 2,500 barrels per week – the brewery constructed its own 2 ft 6 in (762 mm) narrow gauge railway to take barrels of Oakhill Invalid Stout to the Somerset & Dorset Railway in nearby Binegar. Until the railway's construction, the brewery had used a Wallis & Steevens traction engine to deliver their barrels to the station. Production continued at the brewery until the advent of World War I sent it into decline. The brewery was destroyed by fire in 1924, and subsequently taken over by Courage Brewery. Although brewing stopped in 1938, the malt sheds remained in use.

== Beacon Brewery ==
In 1981 brewing resumed in the former Oakhill Brewery building when Beacon Brewery took over the premises to brew Fosseway Bitter and later Fosseway Forty. The brewery went out of business in 1983.

== New Oakhill Brewery ==
In 1984, the brewery plant and premises were bought by local businessman Reg Keevil. Under the name New Oakhill Brewery, he brewed beers until 1997, when he moved the plant to the old Courage maltings in order to expand. The brewery produced 31 different beers through the company's 13 year history, and acquired a small chain of tied houses in the local villages. The brewery closed in 2004 when the owner retired and as at 2014 was being converted to housing.
