= Oak Hill Cemetery Chapel =

Oak Hill Cemetery Chapel may refer to:

- Oak Hill Cemetery Chapel (Washington, D.C.), listed on the NRHP in Washington, D.C.
- Oak Hill Cemetery Chapel (Bellows Falls, Vermont), listed on the NRHP in Windham County

== See also ==
- Oak Hill Cemetery (disambiguation)
