= Wells Forum =

Historical Hundred of Somerset, England

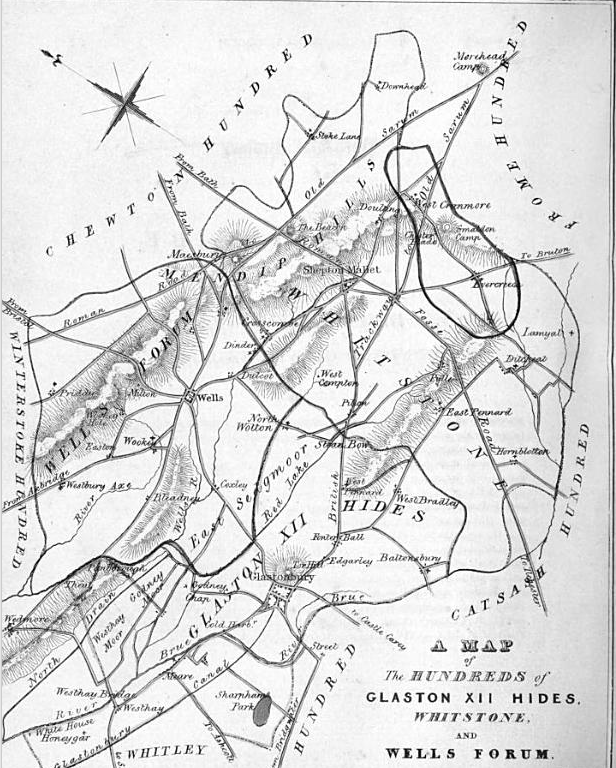
- A map of the hundreds of Glaston XII Hides, Whitstone, and Wells Forum.
- Area
- 30,000 acres (12,000 ha)
- Status: Hundred
- Subdivisions
  - Type: Parishes
  - Units: Binegar; Cranmore West; Dinder; Evercreech; Litton; Priddy; Westbury; Wookey

The Hundred of Wells Forum is one of the 40 historical Hundreds in the ceremonial county of Somerset, England, dating from the Anglo-Saxon era before the Norman conquest. Each hundred had a fyrd which acted as the local defence force, and a court which was responsible for the maintenance of the frankpledge system. The hundred also formed a unit for the collection of taxes. The role of the hundred court was described in the Dooms (laws) of King Edgar. The name of the hundred was normally that of its meeting-place.

The name Wells Forum was derived from the city of Wells, which lies within its limits, to which was added the word Forum, referring to Wells' market place. These were generally called Fora Venalia in Roman times, and this term added to a proper name denotes a market or borough town (e.g. Blandford Forum). The hundred of Wells Forum encompassed the ancient Forest of Mendip, which occupied the northern part; and extended to the south into the lowlands of East Sedgemoor.

Its neighbouring hundreds were Chewton to the north; Whitstone to the east; Glaston Twelve-hides to the south; and Bempstone and Winterstoke to the west. Two small rivers had their source within the hundred: the Wells and the Axe.

The hundred covered around 30,000 acres (12,000 ha) and included the parishes of Binegar, Cranmore West, Dinder, Evercreech, Litton, Priddy, Westbury and Wookey.

Although the Hundred was never formally abolished, its functions ended with the establishment of county courts in 1867 and the introduction of districts by the Local Government Act 1894.
