= Ashwick =

Village in Somerset, England

Coordinates: 51.2335°N 2.5192°W

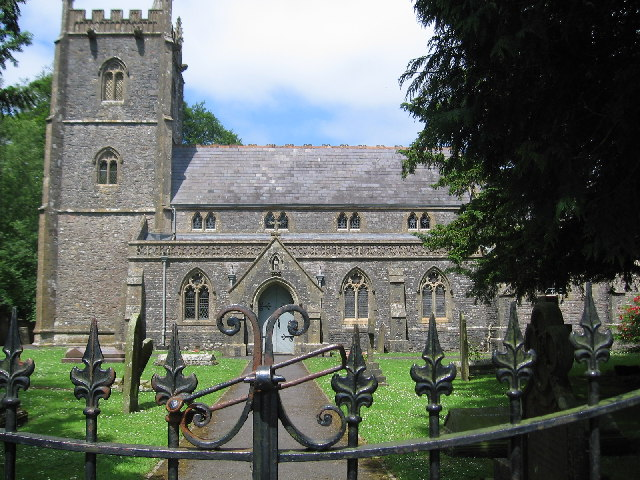
- St James Church

- Location within Somerset
- Population: 1,352 (2011)
- OS grid reference: ST637484
- Unitary authority: Somerset Council
- Ceremonial county: Somerset
- Region: South West
- Country: England
- Sovereign state: United Kingdom
- Post town: Radstock
- Postcode district: BA3
- Police: Avon and Somerset
- Fire: Devon and Somerset
- Ambulance: South Western
- UK Parliament: Frome and East Somerset

Ashwick is a village in Somerset, England, about three miles north of Shepton Mallet and seven miles east from Wells. It has also been a civil parish since 1826. The parish had a population of 1,352 according to the 2011 census, and apart from Ashwick village also includes Gurney Slade, known for its limestone quarry, and Oakhill.

== History ==
The area around Ashwick has evidence of occupation since the Iron Age, being in close proximity to Maesbury Castle. In Roman Britain, Fosse Way was constructed, which passes to the east of the parish.

Although Oakhill is the larger village today, Ashwick is the older settlement, dating back to Anglo-Saxon times. It appears in the Domesday Book as a settlement called Escewiche, which translates as 'the hamlet or farmstead by the ash trees'. The parish of Ashwick was part of the Hundred of Kilmersdon.

The village is the site of Ashwick Court, a country house dating from the late 17th century and Grade II* listed.

Anthony Newley's short-lived 1960 ATV series The Strange World of Gurney Slade continues to have a cult following owing to its postmodern premise that the Newley character is trapped inside a television programme. Newley's character is named "Gurney Slade"; in one typically surreal episode, he encounters a signpost that leads him in the direction of a locale called Gurney Slade, where he casually interacts with a talking dog.

== Geology ==
The nearby Maesbury Railway Cutting of the Somerset and Dorset Joint Railway exposes approximately 135 metres of strata representing the middle and upper Lower Limestone Shales and the basal Black Rock Limestone. Both formations are of early Carboniferous (Courceyan) age.

== Governance ==
The parish council has responsibility for local issues, including setting an annual precept (local rate) to cover the council’s operating costs and producing annual accounts for public scrutiny. The parish council evaluates local planning applications and works with the local police, district council officers, and neighbourhood watch groups on matters of crime, security, and traffic. The parish council's role also includes initiating projects for the maintenance and repair of parish facilities, as well as consulting with the district council on the maintenance, repair, and improvement of highways, drainage, footpaths, public transport, and street cleaning. Conservation matters (including trees and listed buildings) and environmental issues are also the responsibility of the council.

For local government purposes, since 1 April 2023, the parish comes under the unitary authority of Somerset Council. Prior to this, it was part of the non-metropolitan district of Mendip (established under the Local Government Act 1972). It was part of Shepton Mallet Rural District before 1974.

Ashwick is part of the electoral ward called Ashwick, Chilcompton and Stratton. At the 2011 Census the population of this ward was 4,835.

It is also part of the Frome and East Somerset county constituency represented in the House of Commons of the Parliament of the United Kingdom.

== Church ==
The parish Church of St James is a Victorian Gothic building erected between 1876 and 1881 by Browne and Gill of Bath. However, the church tower dates back to 1463. It is a Grade I listed building. The earliest record of a church on the site is 1413, when Bishop Bubwith dedicated a churchyard at Ashwick and authorised burials to take place there, but it is not known when the church was first built. The church was originally a chapel of ease connected to the vicarage at Kilmersdon, near Radstock. It remained so until the formation of Ashwick parish. The benefice of Oakhill was added in 1923 and Binegar was added in 1969, since when one rector has overseen all three villages.

At the west end of the aisles in the Church of St James two memorial tablets can be seen. These are dedicated to John Billingsley, his wife Mary, and their family. The writer of the 1794 Survey of Somerset, Billingsley was a leading agriculturalist who was one of the founders of the Bath and West Society, known today as the Royal Bath and West of England Society. He lived all his life at Ashwick Grove, which is in the nearby village of Oakhill.
