= Oak Hill, Texas =

Oak Hill may refer to:

- Oak Hill, Austin, Texas (in Travis County)
- Oak Hill, Bastrop County, Texas
- Oak Hill, Jasper County, Texas
- Oak Hill, Johnson County, Texas
- Oak Hill, Rusk County, Texas
