= Oak Hill Township =

Oak Hill Township may refer to:

- Oak Hill Township, Crawford County, Missouri
- Oak Hill Township, Granville County, North Carolina, in Granville County, North Carolina
