= Oakfordbridge =

Village in Devon, England

- Village
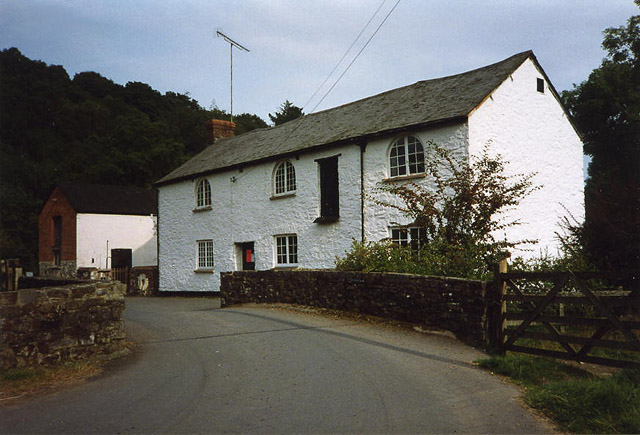
- Oakfordbridge Mill

- Location within Devon Location within the United Kingdom
- Coordinates: 50°59′11″N 3°32′27″W
- Country: England
- County: Devon
- Time zone: UTC+0:00 (GST)

Oakfordbridge is a village in Devon, England. In January 2023, it was flooded after the River Exe burst its banks due to heavy rainfall.

The A396 road connecting Tiverton, Devon, to North Devon, Exmoor, and Somerset passes near The Bark House hotel in Oakfordbridge.
