= Odham =

Hamlet in Devon, England

Coordinates: 50.79°N 04.17°W

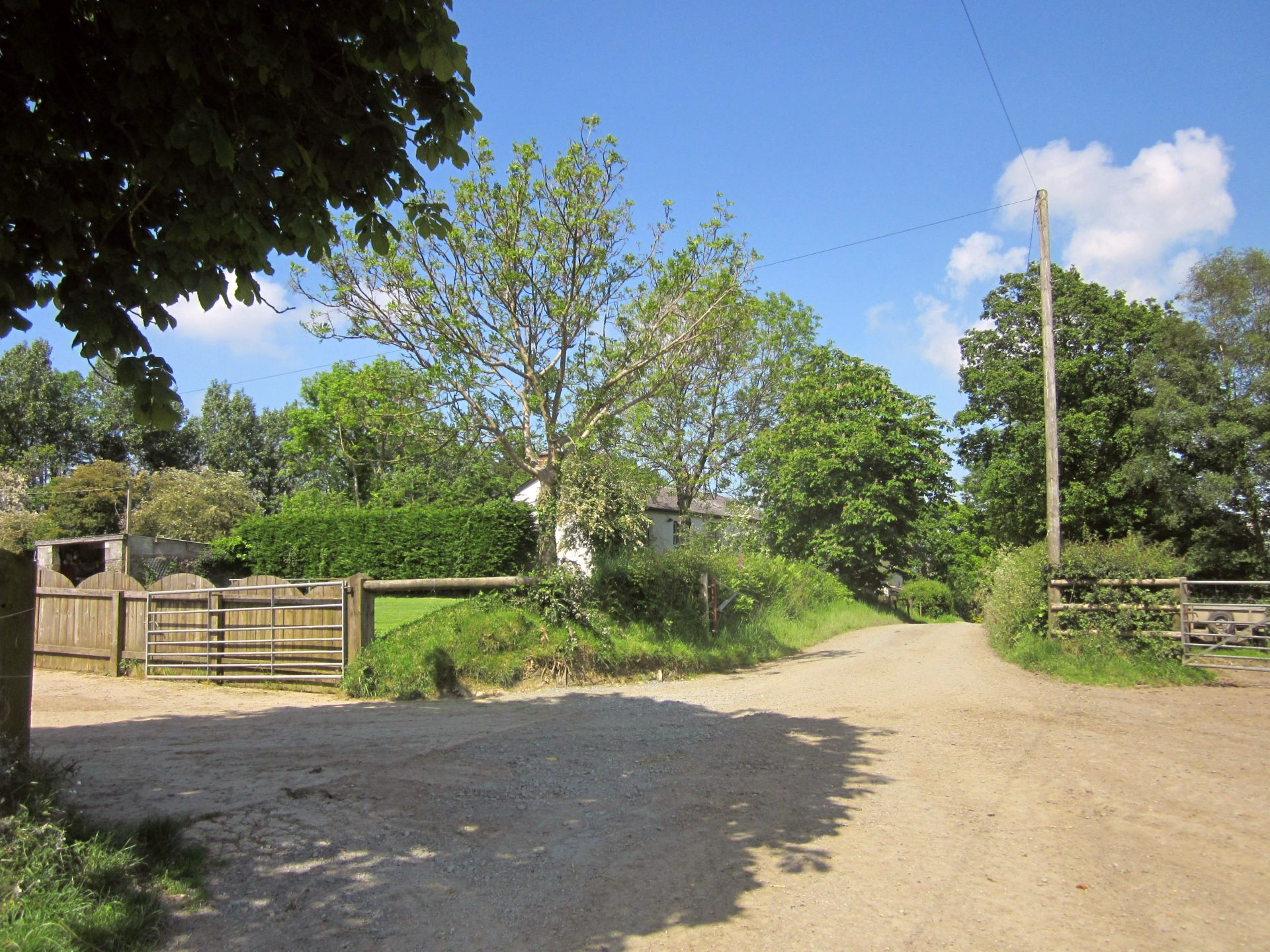
- Lane, Odham

- Location within Devon
- OS grid reference: SS4702
- Shire county: Devon
- Region: South West
- Country: England
- Sovereign state: United Kingdom
- Police: Devon and Cornwall
- Fire: Devon and Somerset
- Ambulance: South Western

Odham is a hamlet in Devon, England.
