= Oaks, Shropshire =

Village in Shropshire, England

Coordinates: 52.636°N 2.853°W

Oaks
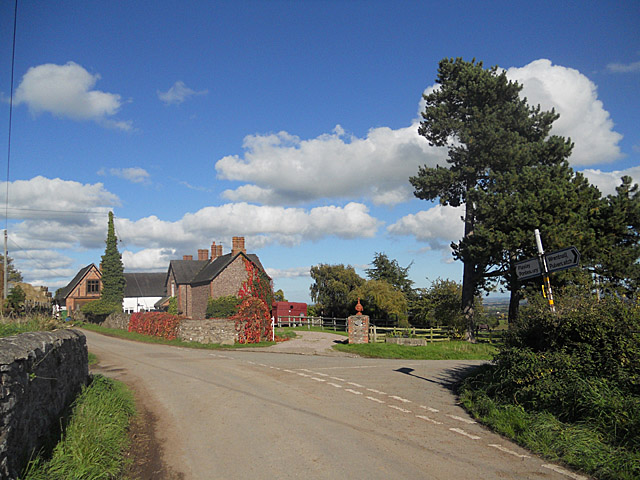
- Oaks junction

- Location within Shropshire
- OS grid reference: SJ422046
- Civil parish: Longden
- Unitary authority: Shropshire
- Ceremonial county: Shropshire
- Region: West Midlands
- Country: England
- Sovereign state: United Kingdom
- Post town: SHREWSBURY
- Postcode district: SY5
- Dialling code: 01743
- Police: West Mercia
- Fire: Shropshire
- Ambulance: West Midlands
- UK Parliament: Shrewsbury and Atcham

Oaks is a village in Shropshire, England, southwest of Shrewsbury.

The manor of Oaks is identified before the Norman Conquest, probably held with the adjacent Pontesbury and Wrentnall.
