= Oak Hills, Oregon =

Unincorporated community in the state of Oregon, United States

- Census-designated place (CDP)
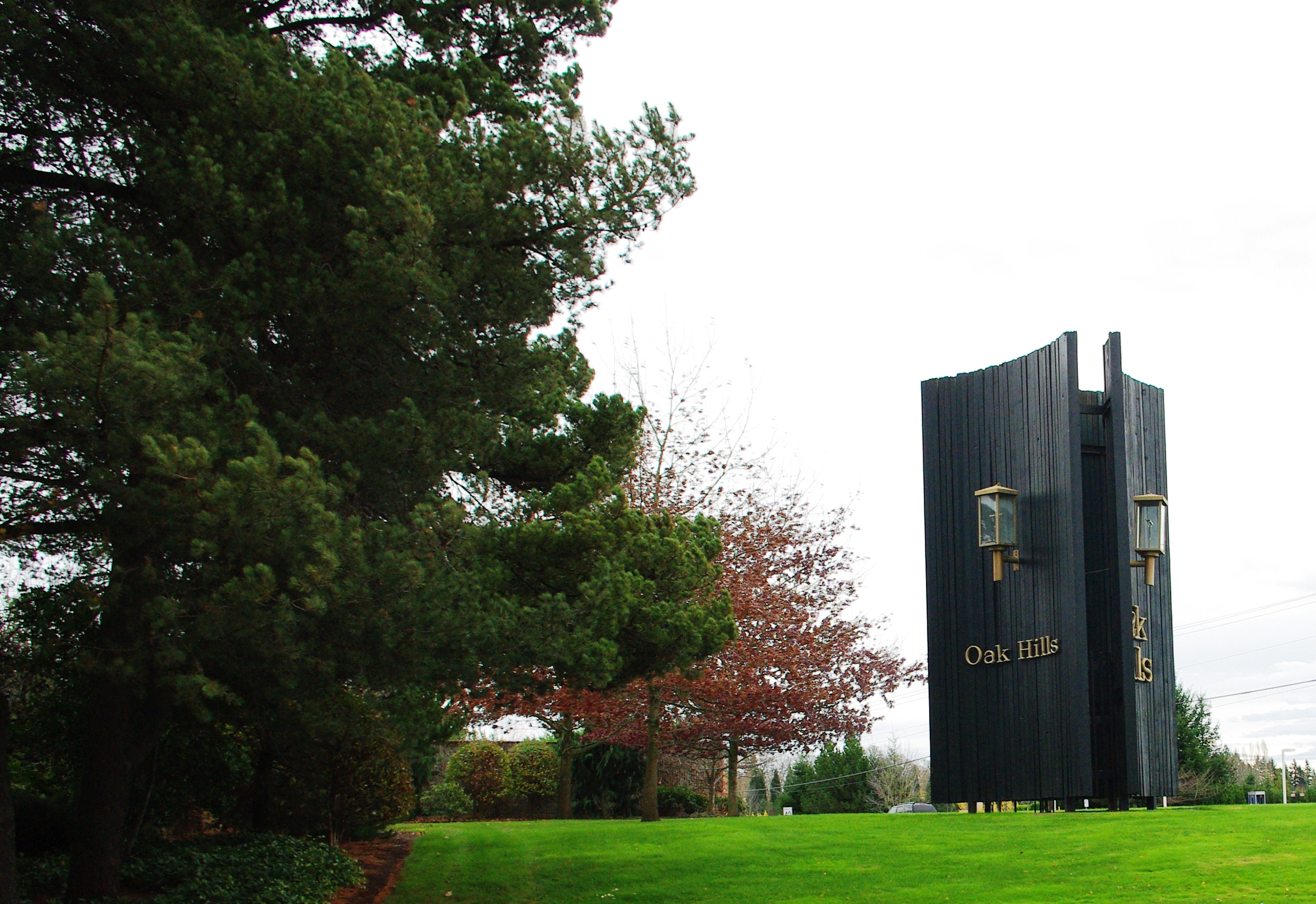
- Entrance to the development

- Location of Oak Hills, Oregon
- Coordinates: 45°32′25″N 122°50′29″W
- Country: United States
- State: Oregon
- County: Washington
- Established: 1965

Area
  - Total: 1.56 sq mi (4.03 km^{2})
  - Land: 1.56 sq mi (4.03 km^{2})
  - Water: 0 sq mi (0.00 km^{2})
- Elevation: 249 ft (76 m)

Population (2020)
  - Total: 11,903
  - Density: 7,643.0/sq mi (2,950.99/km^{2})
- Time zone: UTC-8 (Pacific (PST))
  - Summer (DST): UTC-7 (PDT)
- ZIP code: 97006
- Area codes: 503 and 971
- FIPS code: 41-53988
- GNIS feature ID: 2408963
- Oak Hills Historic District
- U.S. National Register of Historic Places
- U.S. Historic district
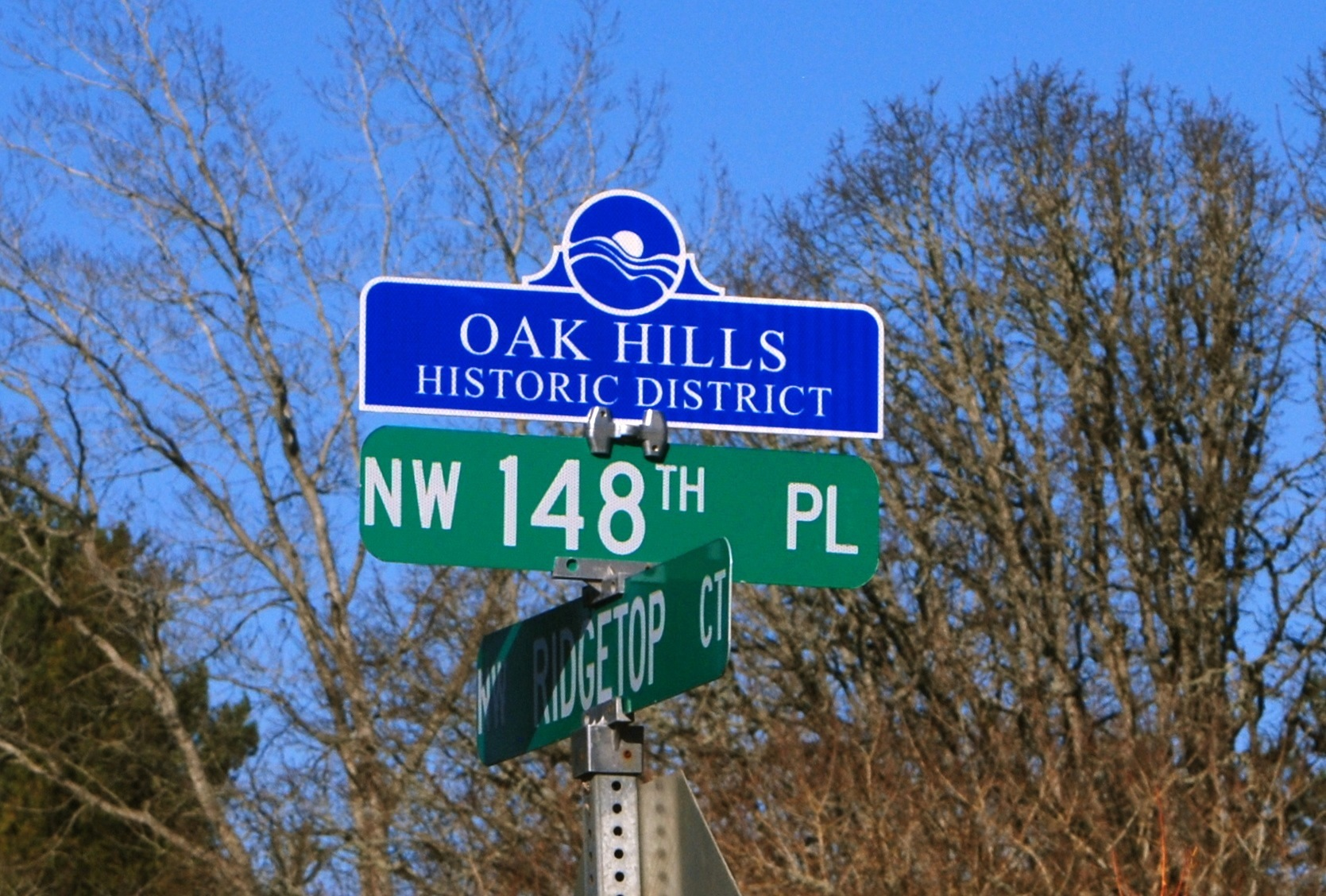
- District sign

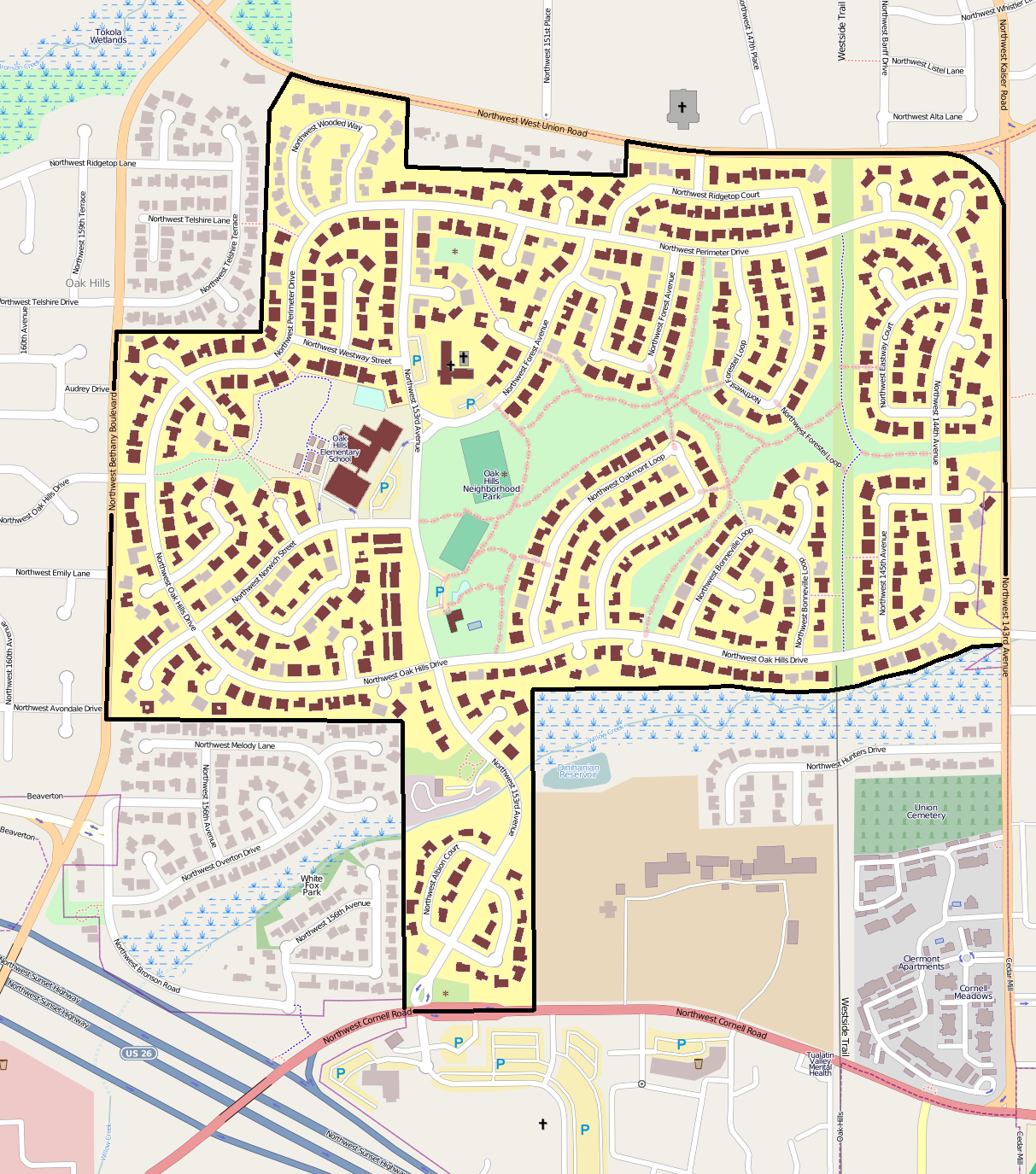
- The Oak Hills Historic District boundaries (black line), and historic contributing resources in the district (brown).
- Location: Roughly bounded by NW West Union & Cornell Roads, NW 143rd Ave., and Bethany Blvd. Washington County, Oregon
- Area: 240 acres (97 ha)
- Architect: Multiple
- NRHP reference No.: 13000482
- Added to NRHP: July 10, 2013

Oak Hills is a census-designated place (CDP) and neighborhood in Washington County, Oregon, United States. The CDP population was 11,903 at the 2020 census. It is on unincorporated land north of Beaverton, west of Cedar Mill, and south/southeast of Bethany. The CDP is roughly bounded by the Sunset Highway on the south, West Union Road on the north, Northwest 174th Avenue on the west, and Northwest 143rd Avenue on the east. The U.S. Postal Service has assigned Beaverton addresses to the area. Fire protection and EMS services are provided through Tualatin Valley Fire and Rescue.

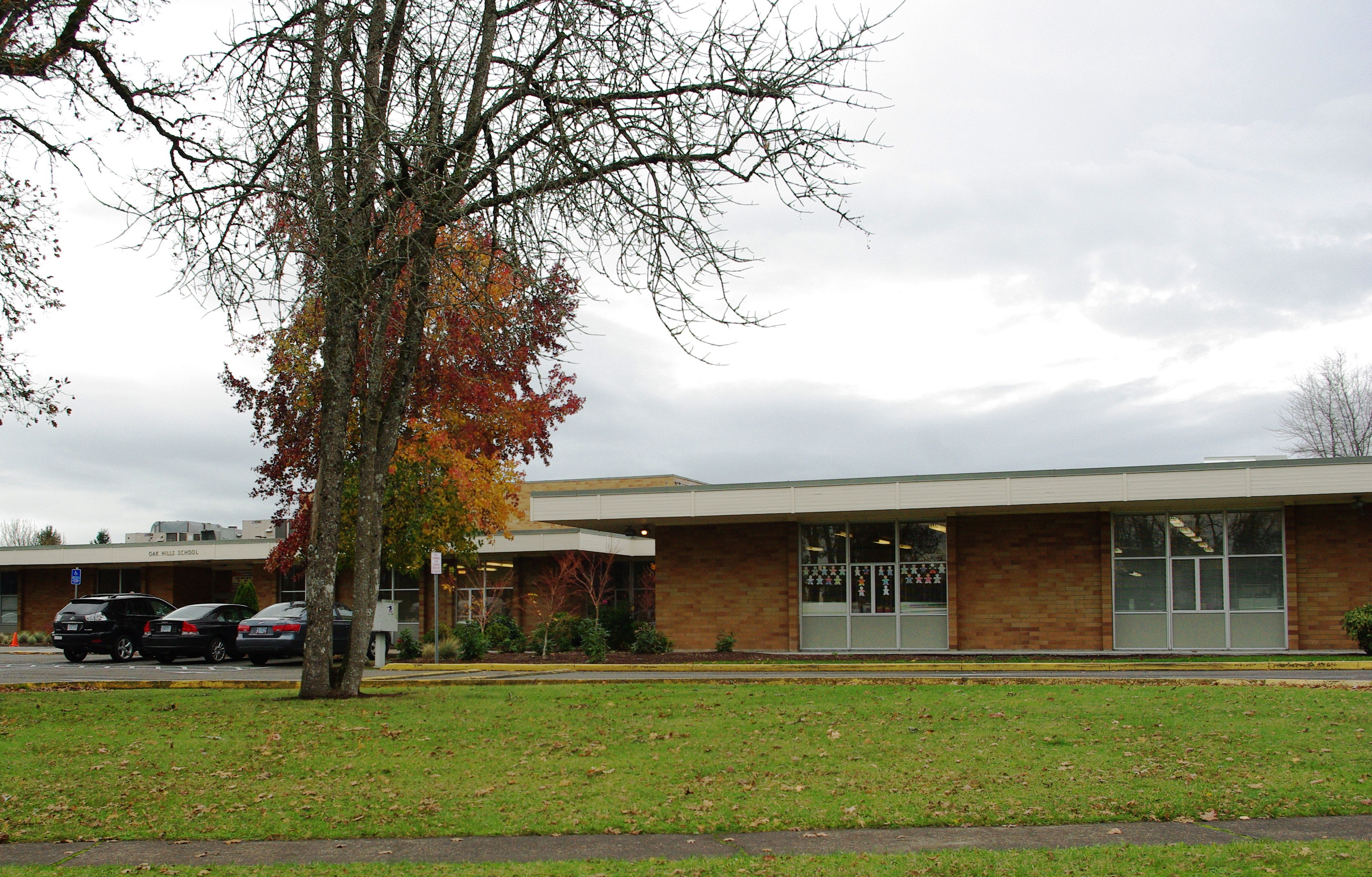
Oak Hills Elementary School

The Oak Hills neighborhood is substantially smaller than the CDP, and is contained within the area bounded by Cornell Road on the south, West Union Road on the north, Bethany Boulevard on the west, and Northwest 143rd Avenue on the east. It was a planned community and was built in the 1960s. The first ten homes were completed in May 1965, the first of about 650 planned, in an area of approximately 250 acres (100 ha). Oak Hills today includes around 650 residences, of which 627 are single-family homes. It is managed by the Oak Hills Homeowners Association (OHHA).

The neighborhood was listed on the National Register of Historic Places in 2013, as the Oak Hills Historic District. It includes 29 homes designed by home builder Robert Rummer.

== Geography ==
According to the United States Census Bureau, the CDP has a total area of 1.5 square miles (3.9 km^{2}), all land.

== Demographics ==
Historical population
Census	Pop.	Note	%±
2020	11,903		—
U.S. Decennial Census

=== 2020 census ===
As of the 2020 census, Oak Hills had a population of 11,903. The median age was 36.9 years. 24.7% of residents were under the age of 18 and 12.5% of residents were 65 years of age or older. For every 100 females there were 98.3 males, and for every 100 females age 18 and over there were 95.8 males age 18 and over.

100.0% of residents lived in urban areas, while 0.0% lived in rural areas.

There were 4,336 households in Oak Hills, of which 38.4% had children under the age of 18 living in them. Of all households, 58.6% were married-couple households, 14.0% were households with a male householder and no spouse or partner present, and 20.3% were households with a female householder and no spouse or partner present. About 19.7% of all households were made up of individuals and 7.1% had someone living alone who was 65 years of age or older.

There were 4,515 housing units, of which 4.0% were vacant. The homeowner vacancy rate was 0.7% and the rental vacancy rate was 6.0%.

Racial composition as of the 2020 census
Race	Number	Percent
White	7,303	61.4%
Black or African American	290	2.4%
American Indian and Alaska Native	57	0.5%
Asian	2,445	20.5%
Native Hawaiian and Other Pacific Islander	66	0.6%
Some other race	486	4.1%
Two or more races	1,256	10.6%
Hispanic or Latino (of any race)	1,206	10.1%

=== 2000 census ===
As of the 2000 census, there were 9,050 people, 3,397 households, and 2,374 families residing in the CDP. The population density was 5,864.8 inhabitants per square mile (2,264.4/km^{2}). There were 3,478 housing units at an average density of 2,253.9 per square mile (870.2/km^{2}). The racial makeup of the CDP was 78.46% White, 1.28% African American, 0.43% Native American, 13.76% Asian, 0.23% Pacific Islander, 3.01% from other races, and 2.83% from two or more races. Hispanic or Latino of any race were 5.82% of the population.

There were 3,397 households, out of which 39.8% had children under the age of 18 living with them, 59.8% were married couples living together, 6.7% had a female householder with no husband present, and 30.1% were non-families. 23.0% of all households were made up of individuals, and 2.9% had someone living alone who was 65 years of age or older. The average household size was 2.66 and the average family size was 3.19.

In the CDP, the population was spread out, with 29.0% under the age of 18, 9.0% from 18 to 24, 34.5% from 25 to 44, 21.6% from 45 to 64, and 6.0% who were 65 years of age or older. The median age was 32 years. For every 100 females, there were 103.0 males. For every 100 females age 18 and over, there were 102.1 males.

The median income for a household in the CDP was $61,217, and the median income for a family was $71,849. Males had a median income of $53,000 versus $29,864 for females. The per capita income for the CDP was $27,163. About 1.4% of families and 3.8% of the population were below the poverty line, including 3.3% of those under age 18 and 3.1% of those age 65 or over.

== Education ==
It is in the Beaverton School District 48J.
