= Oakfield, Ohio =

Unincorporated community in Ohio, U.S.

Coordinates: 39°39′33″N 82°7′0″W

Oakfield is an unincorporated community in Trumbull County, in the U.S. state of Ohio.

== History ==
Oakfield was laid out in 1838. A post office was established at Oakfield in 1845, and remained in operation until 1874.
