= Oakle Street =

Village in Gloucestershire, England

Coordinates: 51.85°N 02.36°W

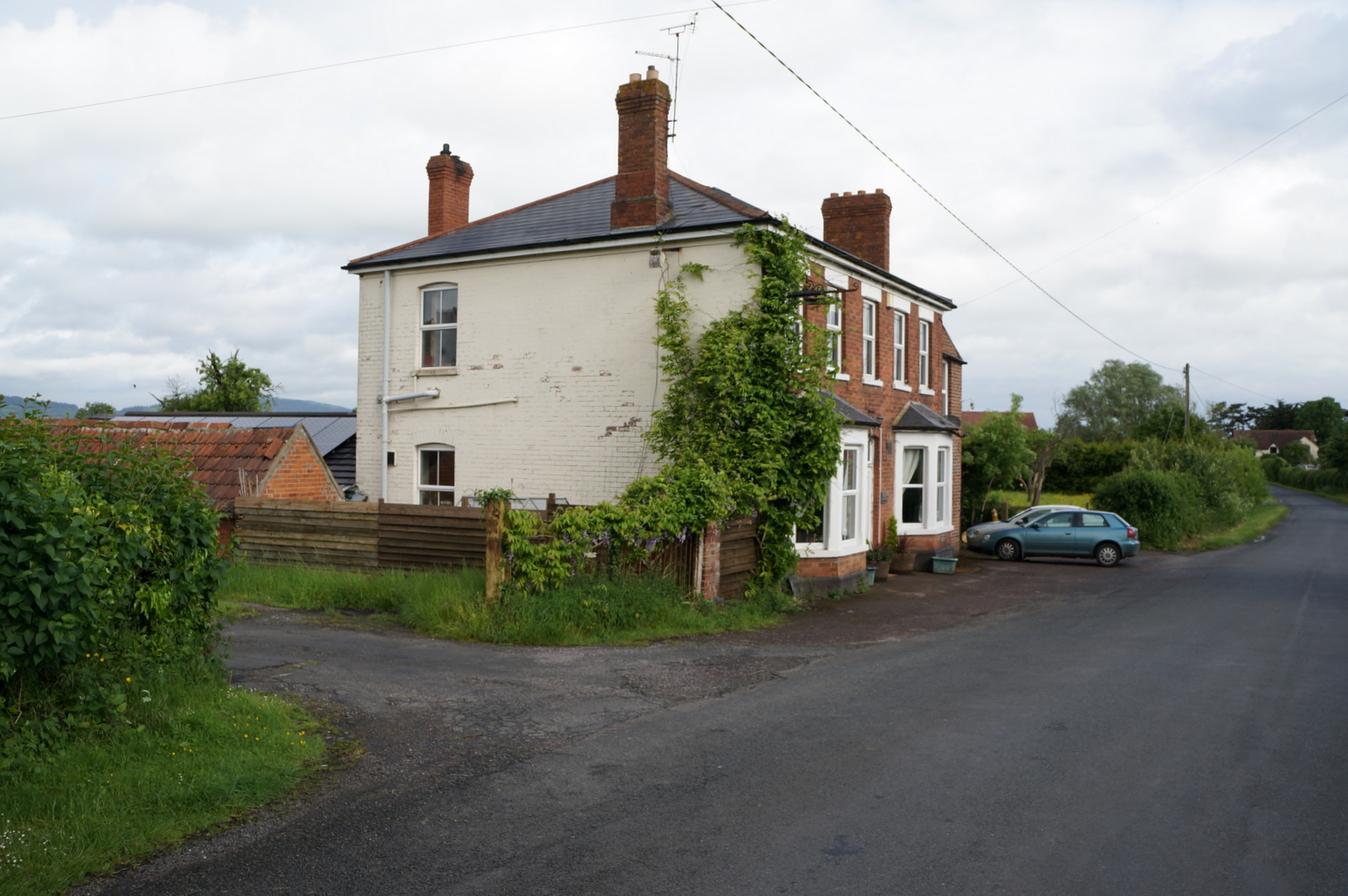
- Houses on Oakle Street

- Location within Gloucestershire
- OS grid reference: SO7517
- District: Tewkesbury / Forest of Dean
- Shire county: Gloucestershire
- Region: South West
- Country: England
- Sovereign state: United Kingdom
- Police: Gloucestershire
- Fire: Gloucestershire
- Ambulance: South Western

Oakle Street is a village in Gloucestershire, England.
