= Odness =

Coordinates: 59.12°N 2.54°W

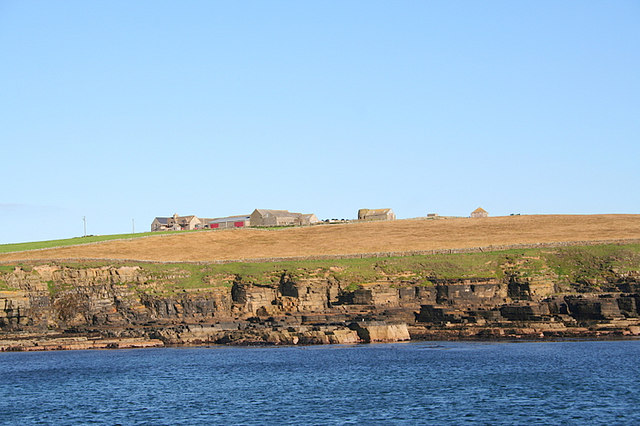
- Odiness Farm, viewed from the sea

- Location within Orkney
- OS grid reference: HY687262
- Civil parish: Stronsay
- Council area: Orkney
- Lieutenancy area: Orkney
- Country: Scotland
- Sovereign state: United Kingdom
- Post town: ORKNEY
- Postcode district: KW17
- Dialling code: 01856
- Police: Scotland
- Fire: Scottish
- Ambulance: Scottish
- UK Parliament: Orkney and Shetland
- Scottish Parliament: Orkney

Odness is a peninsula and headland on the island of Stronsay, in Orkney, Scotland. The Odness peninsula contains the farm of Odiness. Odness is also within the parish of Stronsay.

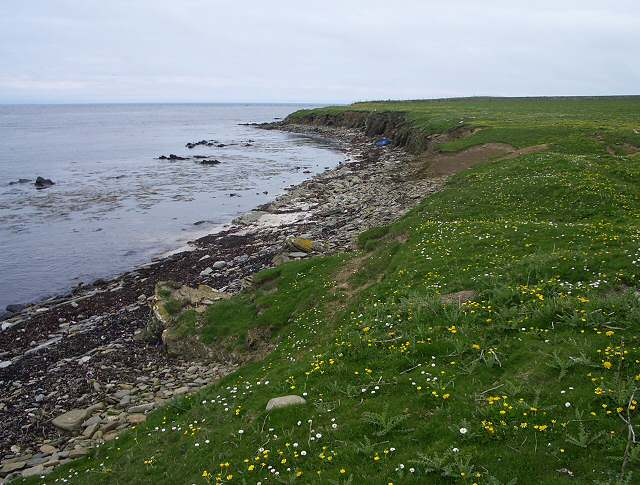
The coast near Odness
