= Oak Hill Cemetery =

Oak Hill Cemetery may refer to:

== Florida ==
- Oak Hill Cemetery (Bartow, Florida), listed on the NRHP in Polk County
- Oak Hill Cemetery (Lake Placid, Florida)

== Georgia (US) ==
- Oak Hill Cemetery (Cartersville, Georgia)
- Oak Hill Cemetery (Newnan, Georgia), listed on the NRHP in Coweta County

== Indiana ==
- Oak Hill Cemetery (Evansville, Indiana), listed on the NRHP in Vanderburgh County
- Oak Hill Cemetery (Lebanon, Indiana)

== Michigan ==
- Oak Hill Cemetery (Battle Creek, Michigan)
- Oak Hill Cemetery (Grand Rapids, Michigan)
- Oak Hill Cemetery (Pontiac, Michigan), listed on the NRHP in Oakland County

== New York ==
- Oak Hill Cemetery (Herkimer, New York), see Robert Earl (judge)
- Oak Hill Cemetery (Oak Hill, New York), listed on the NRHP in Greene County
- Oak Hill Cemetery (Stony Brook, New York), see Joseph Reboli

== Other states ==
- Oak Hill Cemetery (Birmingham, Alabama), listed on the National Register of Historic Places (NRHP) in Jefferson County
- Oak Hill Memorial Park, San Jose, California
- Oak Hill Cemetery, Blue Island, Illinois, adjacent to Lincoln Cemetery
- Oak Hill Cemetery (Lewistown, Illinois), listed on the NRHP in Fulton County
- Oak Hill Cemetery (Cedar Rapids, Iowa), listed on the NRHP in Linn County
- Oak Hill Cemetery (Galena, Kansas), see William Frederick Sapp
- Oak Hill Cemetery (Winona, Mississippi), see Thomas U. Sisson
- Oak Hill Cemetery (Washington, D.C.)
- Oak Hill Cemetery (Janesville, Wisconsin)

== See also ==
- Oak Hill Cemetery Chapel (disambiguation)
