= Gurney Slade (writer) =

Gurney Slade (1886–1956) was the pen name for English author Stephen Bartlett, who was best known for children's books and adventure novels. His novel Lovers and Luggers was filmed by Cinesound Productions in 1937. He wrote three novels about T. E. Lawrence.

He had been a pearler in Broome and served during World War One.

== Writings ==
- Pleasure Island (1924)
- The Pearlers of Lorne : A Story For Boys (1925)
- The Fifteen Men (1925)
- Ships That Pass in the Night Clubs (1926)
- The Black Pyramid (1926)
- Lovers and Luggers (1928)
- The Treasure of the Pass (1928)
- In Lawrence's Bodyguard (1930)
- The Delta Patrol (1934)
- Led by Lawrence (1934)
- Through the Never-Never (1935)
- A North Sea Quest (1935)
- Gentlemen o' Fortune (1935)
- Lawrence in the Blue (1936)
- A Bush Rescue (1936)
- Captain Quid (1937)
- Quid's Quest (1939)
- Kharga the Camel (1948)
- Pingoo the Penguin (1948)
- Tamba the Lion (1949)
- Bawse the Badger (1950)
- The Long Arm of the Cardinal (1953)
- The League of Guy Varenne (1954)
