= Oak Hill (Cumberland, Virginia) =

Historic house in Virginia, United States

- U.S. National Register of Historic Places
- Virginia Landmarks Register
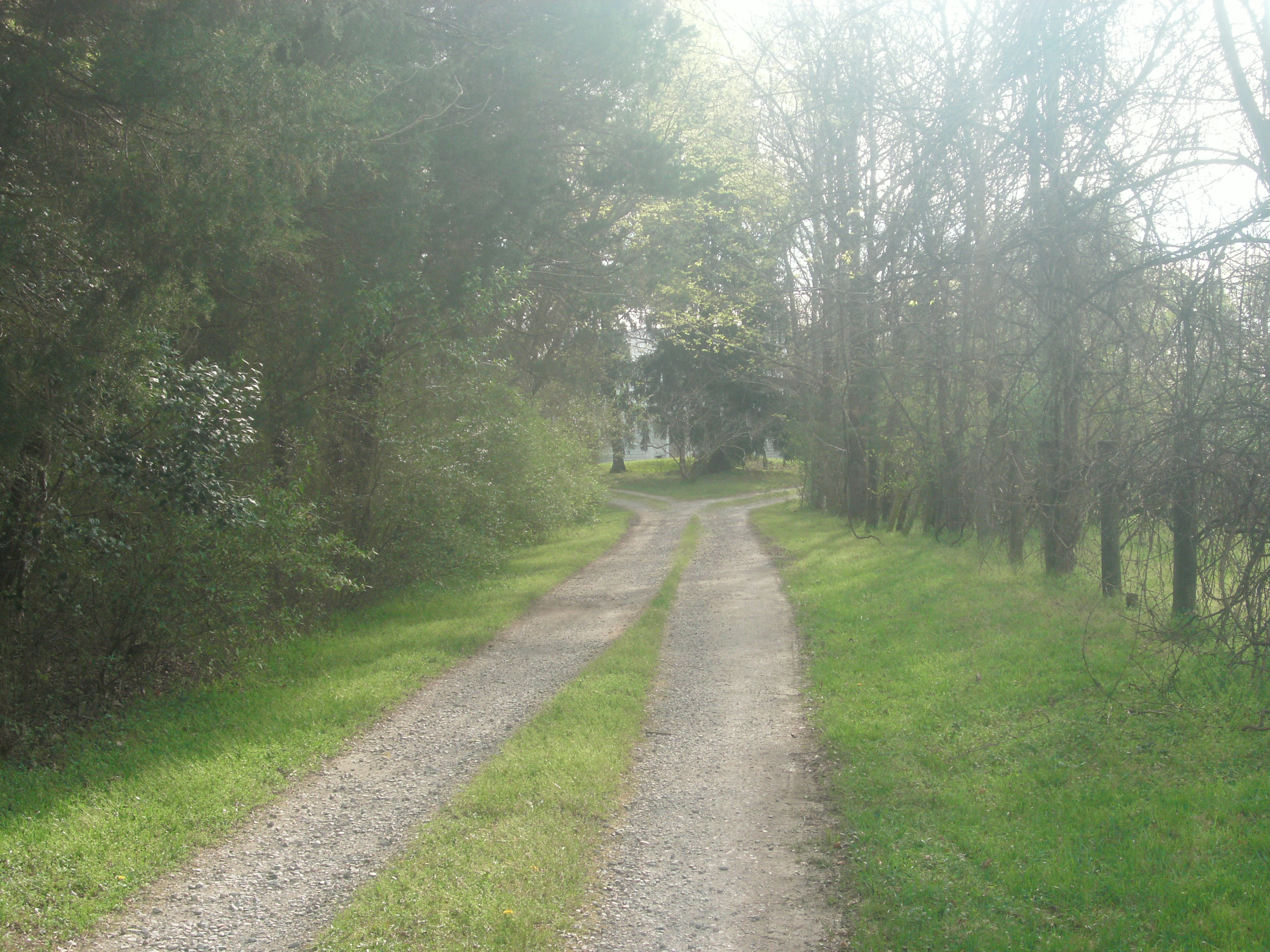
- The front drive of Oak Hill, seen in April 2017; the house is barely visible behind the trees in the near distance

- Location within Virginia Location within the United States
- Location: 181 Oak Hill Rd., Cumberland, Virginia
- Coordinates: 37°29′37″N 78°18′48″W
- Area: 14 acres (5.7 ha)
- Built: 1810
- Architectural style: Federal
- NRHP reference No.: 05000764
- VLR No.: 024-0087

Significant dates
- Added to NRHP: July 27, 2005
- Designated VLR: June 1, 2005

Oak Hill is a historic plantation house located near Cumberland, Cumberland County, Virginia. It was built about 1810, and is a two-story, frame dwelling with a center-passage, single-pile floor plan, in the Federal style. It has a one-story rear ell added about 1940. Also on the property are a contributing bank barn (c. 1930), tobacco barn/hay barn (c. 1890), tenant dwelling/granary (c. 1890), and family cemetery. In 1936, the property was acquired by the Resettlement Administration and conveyed by deed to the Department of Conservation and Economic Development in 1954. Since then, it has been rented to employees who are either working at the Cumberland State Forest or for other state agencies.

It was listed on the National Register of Historic Places in 2005.
