= Oakfield High School and College =

Location
- Long Lane; Hindley; Greater Manchester, WN2 4XA; England; 53.5315°N 2.5545°W

Information
- Type: Community special school
- Established: 2006
- Local authority: Wigan Council
- Department for Education URN: 131530 Tables
- Ofsted: Reports
- Head of School: L Hunt
- Executive Headteacher: S Allen
- Gender: Coeducational
- Age: 11 to 19
- Website: http://www.oakfield.wigan.sch.uk/

Oakfield High School and College is a special school based in Hindley, Wigan. The most recent Ofsted inspection rated the school as "Outstanding".

The school opened in September 2006 following the amalgamation of five special schools in the borough. The school philosophy is based on their motto "Learning today for our tomorrow".

Oakfield High School and College, Aspire College, Landgate College and Landgate School, Bryn are federated through The Aspire Federation.
