= Oak Hill Cemetery (Lake Placid, Florida) =

Cemetery in Highlands County, Florida

Coordinates: 27°19′29″N 81°21′55″W

- Interactive map of Oak Hill Cemetery

Details
- Location: Lake Placid, Florida
- No. of interments: Over 3,000

Oak Hill Cemetery is a cemetery located in Lake Placid, Florida, United States. The city-owned cemetery has over 3,000 interments.
