= Oak Hill, Staffordshire =

Coordinates: 52.99°N 02.21°W

Oak Hill
- Location within Staffordshire
- OS grid reference: SJ8644
- District: Stoke-on-Trent
- Shire county: Staffordshire
- Region: West Midlands
- Country: England
- Sovereign state: United Kingdom
- Post town: Stoke-on-Trent
- Postcode district: ST4
- Dialling code: 01782
- Police: Staffordshire
- Fire: Staffordshire
- Ambulance: West Midlands
- UK Parliament: Stoke-on-Trent

Oak Hill is an area in Stoke-on-Trent.
