= Oak Hill (Colonial Heights, Virginia) =

Historic house in Virginia, United States

- U.S. National Register of Historic Places
- Virginia Landmarks Register
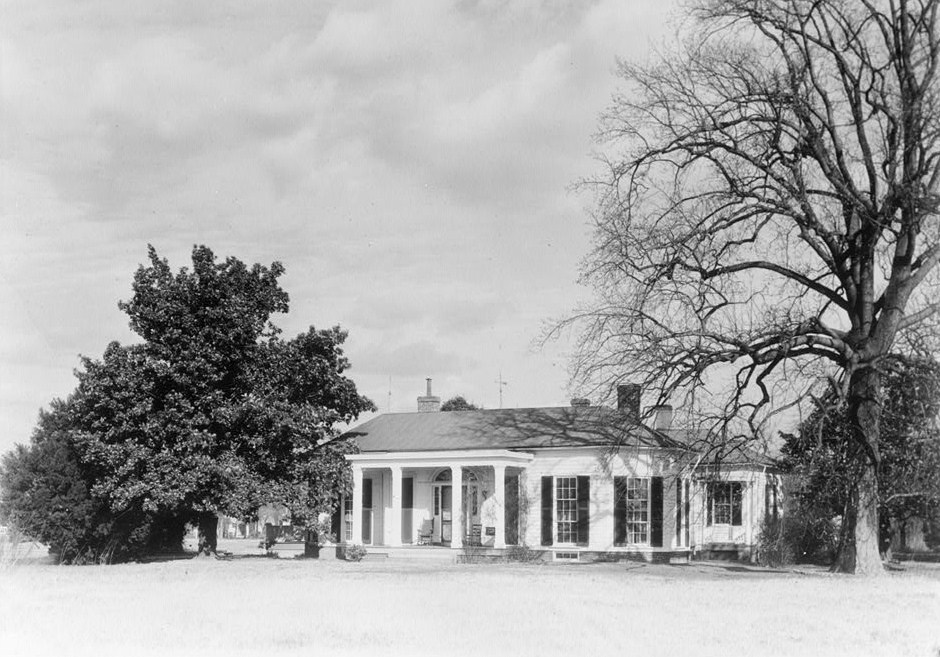
- Oak Hill, HABS Photo

- Location within Virginia Location within the United States
- Location: 151 Carroll Ave., Colonial Heights, Virginia
- Coordinates: 37°14′12″N 77°24′33″W
- Area: 10 acres (4.0 ha)
- Built: 1825-1826
- Architectural style: Greek Revival
- NRHP reference No.: 74002233
- VLR No.: 106-0004

Significant dates
- Added to NRHP: July 30, 1974
- Designated VLR: April 16, 1974

The Oak Hill is a historic plantation house located at Colonial Heights, Virginia. It was built in 1825–1826, and is a one-story, frame dwelling with Greek Revival style interior decorative details. It originally had an "H" shape, but was subsequently expanded with several additions. It features a distinctive elongated octagonal wing at the west end, inspired by nearby Violet Bank.

It was listed on the National Register of Historic Places in 1974.
