= Gurney Slade quarry =

Limestone quarry in Somerset, England

Coordinates: 51.24524°N 2.53719°W

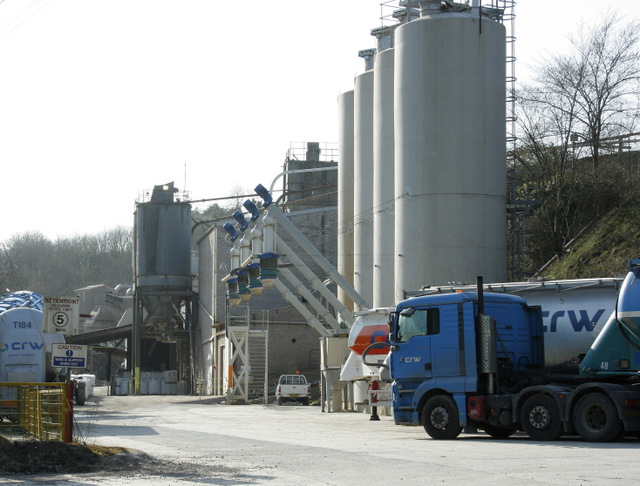
Gurney Slade quarry

Gurney Slade quarry, grid reference ST626497 is a limestone quarry near Gurney Slade between Binegar and Holcombe, on the Mendip Hills, Somerset, England.

Gurney Slade quarry exhibits pale to very dark grey carboniferous limestone overlain by red and purple-coloured Triassic breccias and marls with a small faulted block of overlying Lower Jurassic breccias forming an angular unconformity with the carboniferous limestone. There is abundant vertical sediment infilling fissures and joints (Neptunian Dykes). The rocks contain varying amounts of calcite mineralisation, and there is common fossil material associated with the Carboniferous and Jurassic limestones. The limestone within the quarry dips to the south-east at around 30°.

Work began at the quarry in the mid 18th century and grew after it was taken over by Francis Flower and Sons in 1928, producing stone for lime-burning. The quarry closed in 1947, but was reopened in 1951 by John Yeoman of Foster Yeoman. The next owner was City Sand and Gravel Co., taken over by Morris & Perry (Gurney Slade) Ltd. who still operate the quarry. A concrete plant was installed in 1963 and a coated macadam plant in 2001. The site is now capable of supplying up to 2 million tonnes per annum of carboniferous limestone aggregate. Francis Flower have a facility adjacent to the quarry which processes filler by-product from several Mendip quarries.

== See also ==
- Quarries of the Mendip Hills
