= Ashwick Court =

Country house in Somerset, England

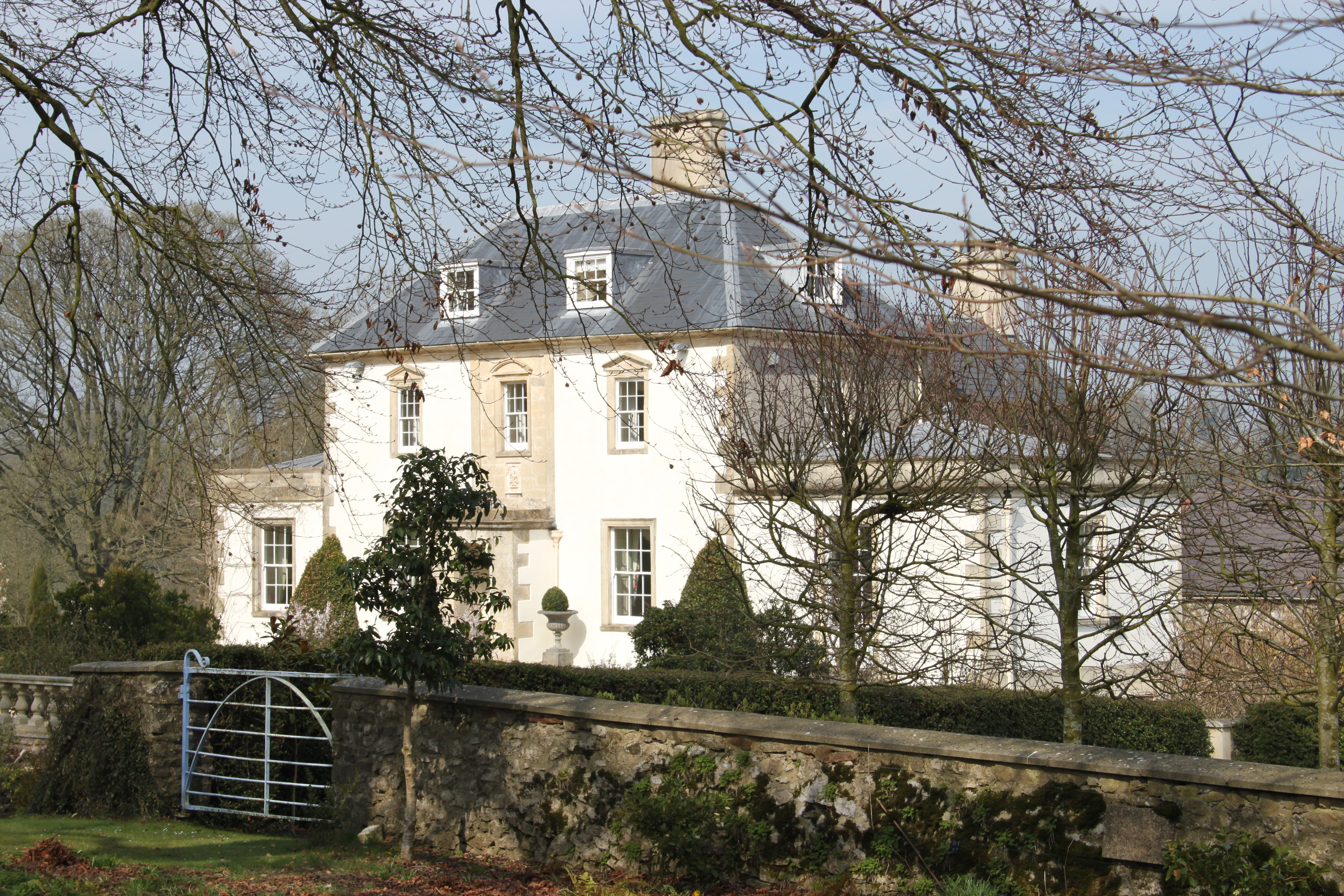

- Location within Somerset

General information
- Location: Ashwick, Mendip, Somerset, England
- Coordinates: 51.2345°N 2.5217°W
- Completed: Late 17th century

Ashwick Court is Grade II listed house on Heckley Lane northwest of Ashwick, in Mendip district, eastern Somerset, England, adjacent to the Church of St James. It is a country house, dating from the late 17th century and became a listed building on 2 June 1961. Alterations were added to the property in the 18th and mid-19th century.

== Building ==
Parts of Ashwick Court date from the 17th century, but the building was extensively remodelled during the 18th century, including being given a new frontage. Two wings were added in the 20th century, the west wing in 1928 and the east in 1996. The main building is constructed of rendered rubble stone, with quoins in unrendered Bath stone ashlar.

The two-story house has a near square floorplan, with a south entrance. The entrance bay and above is unrendered, with a 19th-century arched stone porch. Above the porch is a plaque made of stone showing the Strachey coat of arms and motto. The rear of the house includes more of the original 17th-century building, while the front dates to the 18th century. The house is built into a slope, so the entrances on the northern side are at basement level.

== History ==
Judge Jeffries is believed to have tried cases at Ashwick Court during the Bloody Assizes following the Monmouth Rebellion in 1685, possibly leading to the building being called a 'court', however the name 'court' only came into use during the 19th century, so the name may be simple gentrification.

The building was bought by Richard Strachey in 1823, whose family, the Strachey Baronets, retain ownership until 1924. The house was let to Dr Newton Wade in 1892 who thought he had discovered oil in the water well.
