= Binegar =

Village and civil parish in Somerset, England

Coordinates: 51.2433°N 2.5508°W

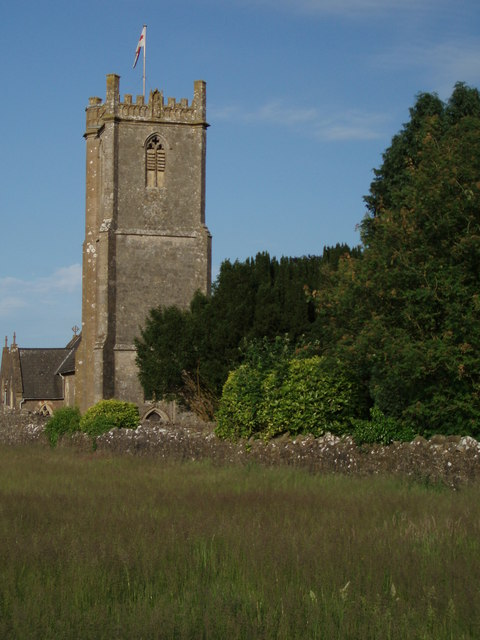
- Holy Trinity parish church

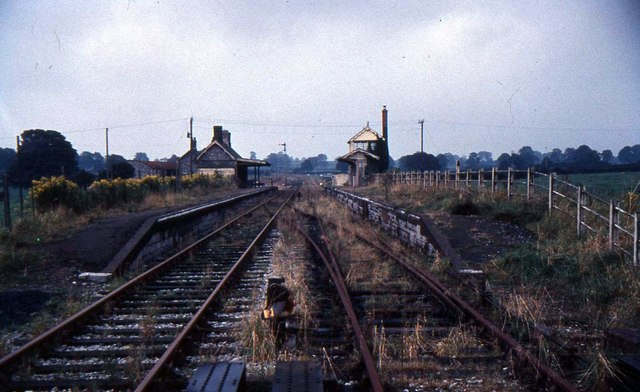
- Binegar Railway Station

- Location within Somerset
- Population: 313
- OS grid reference: ST615495
- Unitary authority: Somerset Council
- Ceremonial county: Somerset
- Region: South West
- Country: England
- Sovereign state: United Kingdom
- Post town: RADSTOCK
- Postcode district: BA3
- Police: Avon and Somerset
- Fire: Devon and Somerset
- Ambulance: South Western
- UK Parliament: Frome and East Somerset

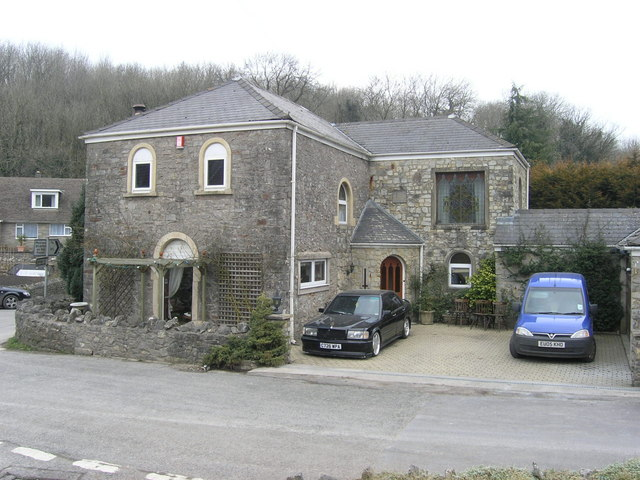
Gurney Slade (Binegar) Former Chapel.

Binegar is a small village and civil parish in Somerset, England. It is located on the A37, 4 miles (6.4 km) east of Wells, between Shepton Mallet and Chilcompton. Its population in 2011 was 313. Binegar and Gurney Slade on the opposite side of the A37 are effectively a single village and share a sign on the main road. In Gurney Slade, the quarry and houses on the north side of Tape Lane are in Binegar parish whilst the south side is in Ashwick parish. In Binegar, some houses on the south side of Station Road are in Ashwick parish and some on the north side of the village are in Emborough parish.

== History ==
The parish was part of the hundred of Wells Forum.

The name of the village was Begenhangra, in a charter of 1065, which probably meant the slope where beans are grown. It formed part of the endowment of Wells Cathedral.

Calamine ore was mined at Merchants Hill in the late 18th century, but the area's principal focus was on limestone quarrying, at Gurney Slade quarry, and agriculture. Adjacent to the quarry there is now a plant which processes powdered material (known as filler) from various Mendip quarries.

It used to have a station on the Somerset and Dorset Joint Railway, which closed in 1966, and was the site of accidents on the line in 1885 and 1886.

The village had a Church of England Voluntary Controlled primary school, which was shut at the end of 2011.

Today the village has two pubs, the Horse & Jockey and The George.

== Governance ==
The parish council has responsibility for local issues, including setting an annual precept (local rate) to cover the council's operating costs and producing annual accounts for public scrutiny. The parish council evaluates local planning applications and works with the local police, district council officers, and neighbourhood watch groups on matters of crime, security, and traffic. The parish council's role also includes initiating projects for the maintenance and repair of parish facilities, as well as consulting with the district council on the maintenance, repair, and improvement of highways, drainage, footpaths, public transport, and street cleaning. Conservation matters (including trees and listed buildings) and environmental issues are also the responsibility of the council.

For local government purposes, since 1 April 2023, the parish comes under the unitary authority of Somerset Council. Prior to this, it was part of the non-metropolitan district of Mendip (established under the Local Government Act 1972). It was part of Shepton Mallet Rural District before 1974.

It is also part of the Frome and East Somerset county constituency represented in the House of Commons of the Parliament of the United Kingdom. It elects one Member of Parliament (MP) by the first past the post system of election.

== Religious sites ==
The Norman Church of the Holy Trinity was rebuilt in the 15th century, and again rebuilt (except for the tower) in 1858 for Rev William Heade. The tower contains two bells dating from 1776 and made by William Bilbie of the Bilbie family. It has been designated by English Heritage as a Grade II* listed building.
