= Oak Hill, Page County, Virginia =

Unincorporated community in Virginia, US

Coordinates: 38°44′04″N 78°24′46″W

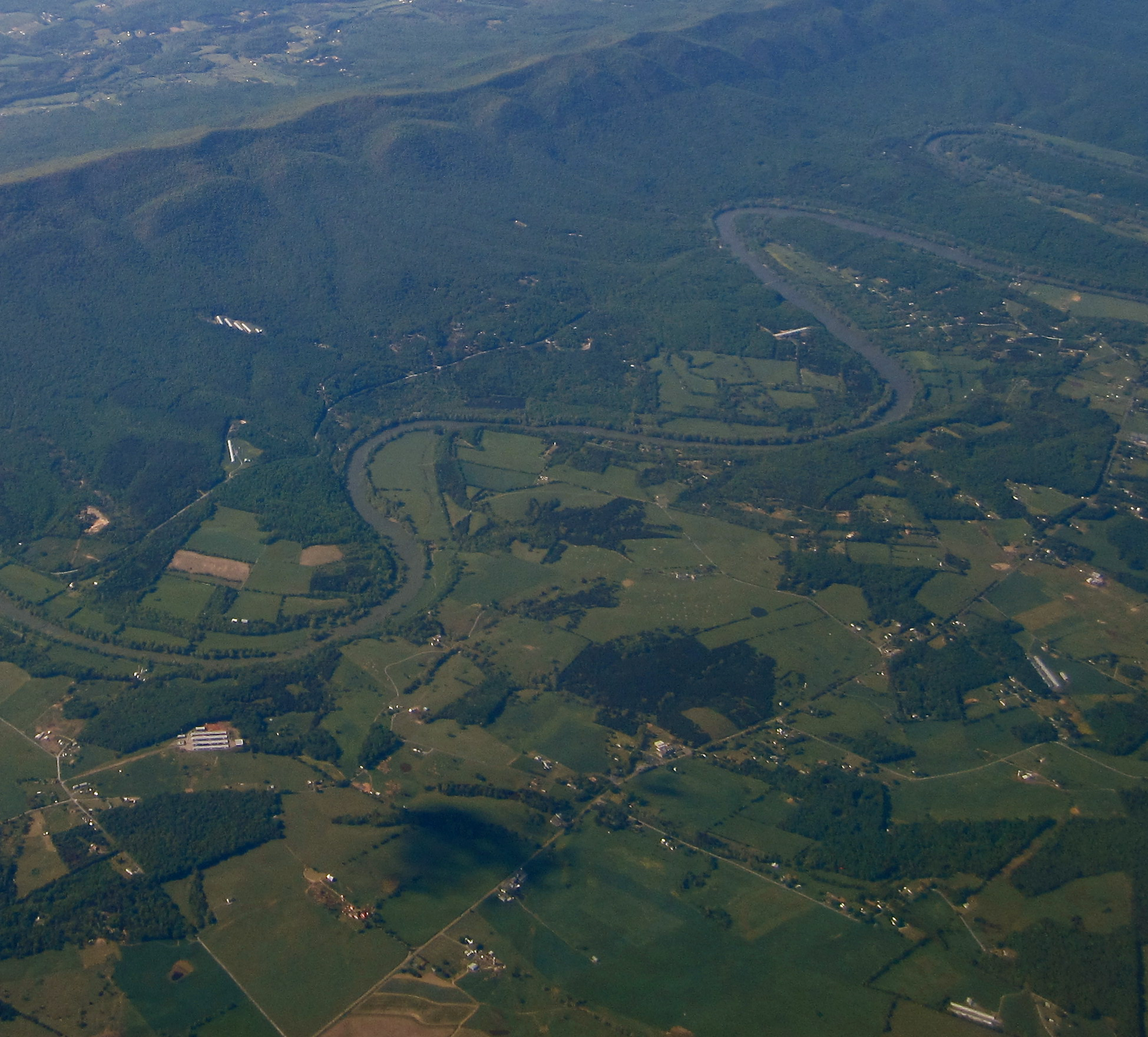
Oak Hill with Shenandoah River in the background

Oak Hill is an unincorporated community in Page County, in the U.S. state of Virginia.
