= Oak Hill, Pittsylvania County, Virginia =

Unincorporated community in Virginia, US

Coordinates: 36°33′16″N 79°35′48″W

Oak Hill is an unincorporated community in Pittsylvania County, in the U.S. state of Virginia.
