= Oak Hill (Annandale, Virginia) =

Historic house in Virginia, United States

- U.S. National Register of Historic Places
- Virginia Landmarks Register
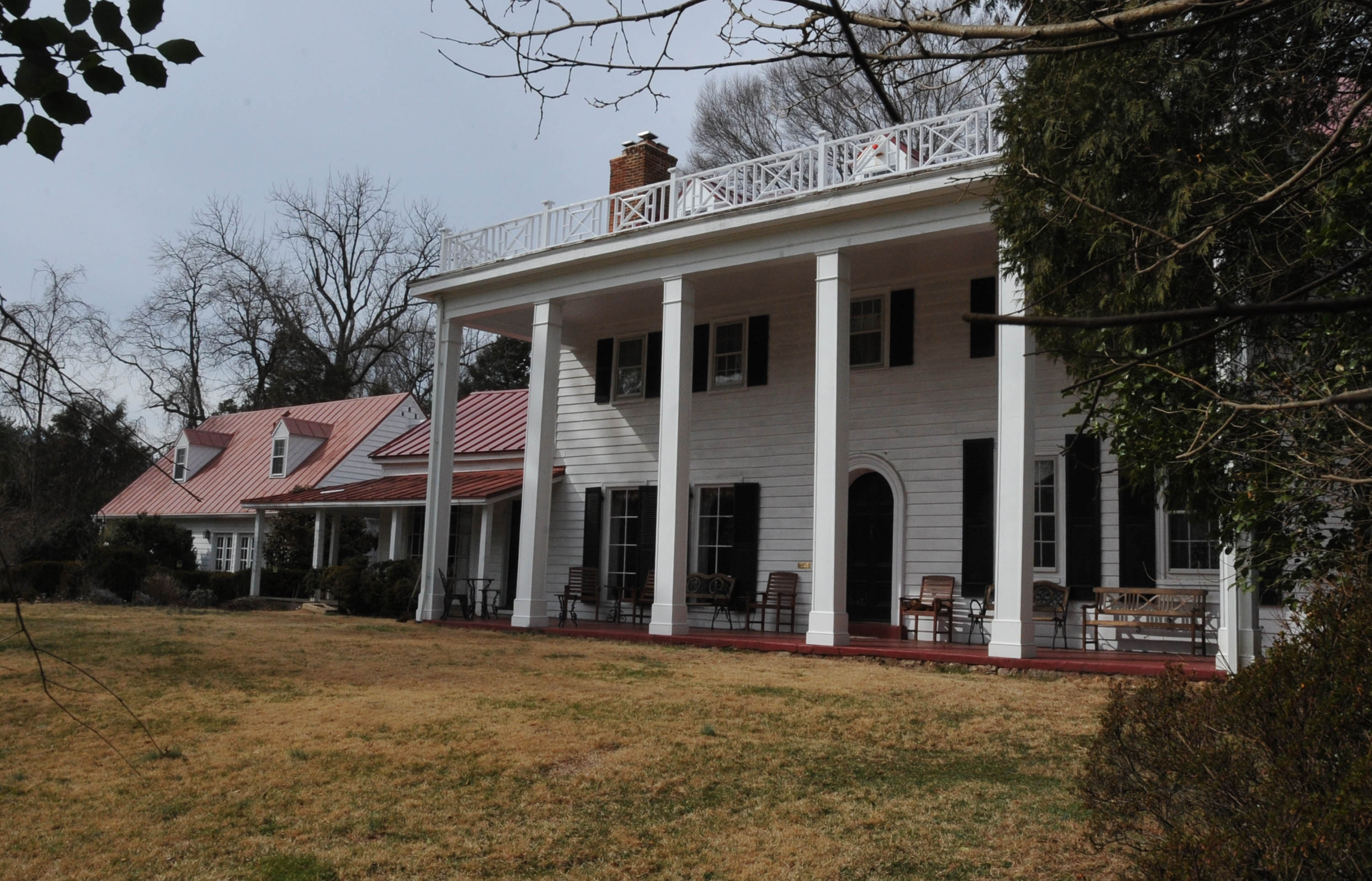

- Location within Northern Virginia Location within Virginia Location within the United States
- Location: 4716 Wakefield Chapel Rd., Annandale, Virginia
- Coordinates: 38°49′15″N 77°14′25″W
- Area: 2.7 acres (1.1 ha)
- Built: 1790
- Architect: Macomber, Walter M.
- Architectural style: Georgian, Colonial Revival
- NRHP reference No.: 04000478
- VLR No.: 029-0028

Significant dates
- Added to NRHP: 19 May 2004
- Designated VLR: March 17, 2004

Oak Hill in Annandale, Virginia, United States, is a Georgian style home built in 1790. It was listed on the National Register of Historic Places in 2004.

It was extensively renovated in the 1930s and is significant for its architecture after that renovation.

== History ==
On the night of November 5, 1861, a shootout occurred at Oak Hill between members of the units later involved in the Bog Wallow Ambush, in an area of much probing and patrolling between Union and Confederate forces. All three of the Fitzhugh estates were protected by orders from both sides throughout the war.

David and Amanda Scheetz purchased the home in 2008, after a foreclosure, for $1.15 million. The home is open to tours periodically.
