= Oakhill =

Village in Somerset, England

Coordinates: 51.224°N 2.523°W

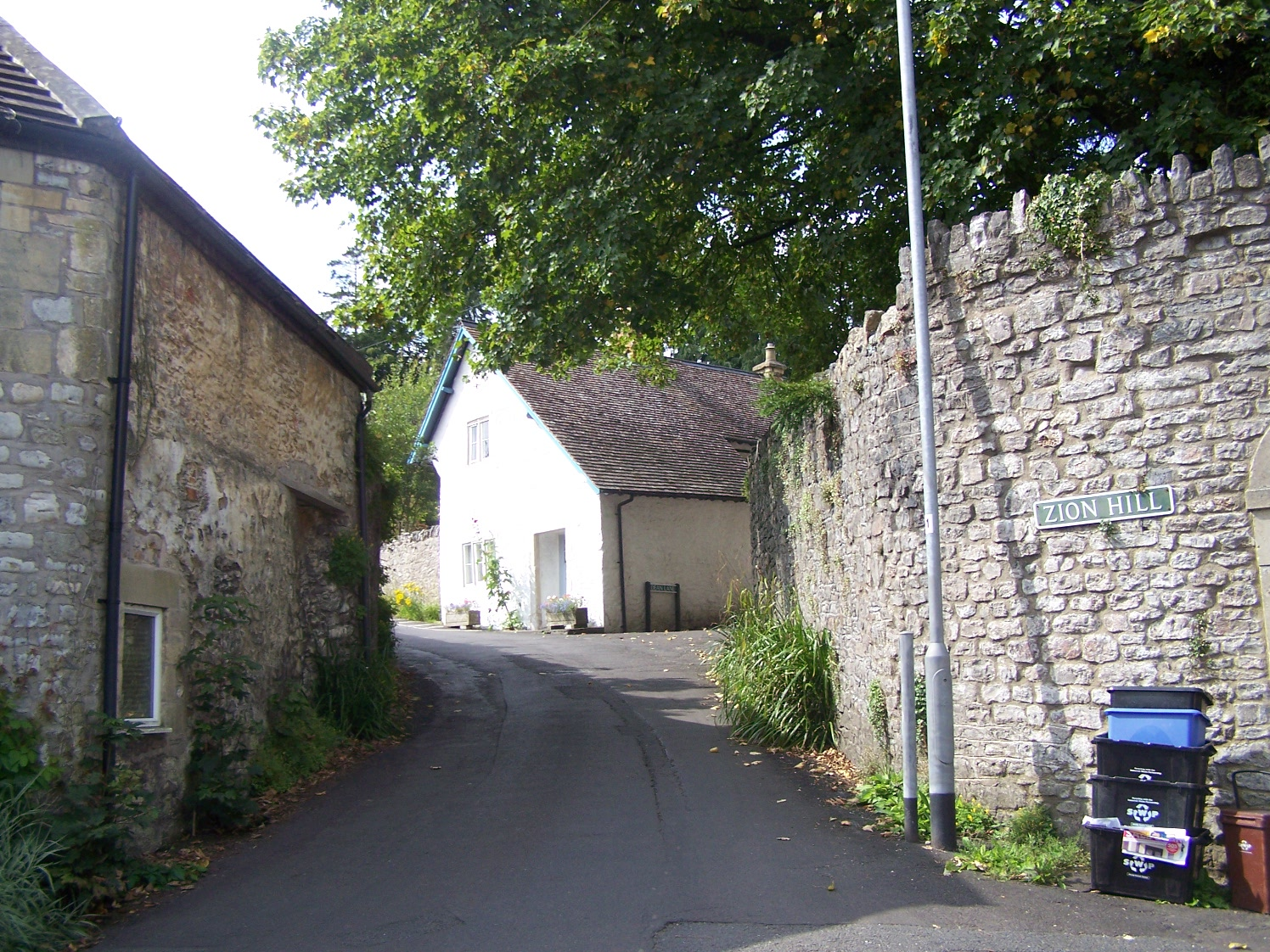
- Zion Hill, Oakhill

- Location within Somerset
- OS grid reference: ST635473
- Civil parish: Ashwick
- Unitary authority: Somerset Council
- Ceremonial county: Somerset
- Region: South West
- Country: England
- Sovereign state: United Kingdom
- Post town: Radstock
- Postcode district: BA3
- Dialling code: 01749
- Police: Avon and Somerset
- Fire: Devon and Somerset
- Ambulance: South Western
- UK Parliament: Frome and East Somerset

Oakhill is a village in Somerset, England, in Ashwick parish approximately 2.5 miles (4 km) north of Shepton Mallet. It lies between the A37 and the A367 (which is part of the ancient Fosse Way). Oakhill is today mainly a commuter village of 0.4 square miles (1.0 km^{2}) in size, and is notable for former activities which including brewing. The village contains a Church of England primary school and a surgery, as well as a public house, the Oakhill Inn.

Little London is the name given to a cluster of houses at the western end of the village. It is sometimes referred to by tradespeople etc. as a settlement in itself for the purpose of location, because of the elongated character of the village.

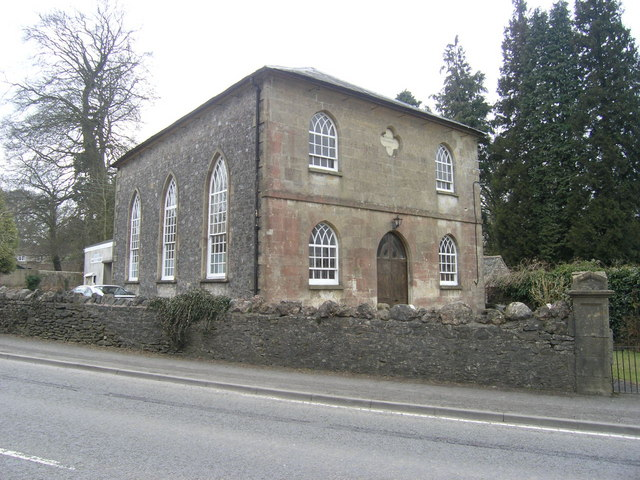
Oakhill Methodist Church

== History ==
A brewing industry led to the growth of the village, and as a result a parish church, All Saints, was built in 1861 to a design by J. L. Pearson to provide a place of worship for the inhabitants, who previously had belonged to the parishes of Ashwick or Shepton Mallet, the boundary between which ran down the High Street. Its own small ecclesiastical parish was set up, with boundary stones marked OASCC (Oakhill All Saints Consolidated Chapelry).

The village borders with the civil parish village of Ashwick. The 1825 Methodist chapel was once not the only such place of worship. There was also an Independent Chapel, built in 1872 to an ambitious design to replace a smaller Congregational chapel at Little London, and often dubbed locally the Little Cathedral. It is now converted to two dwellings, the Bell Tower (this was originally erected before the rest of the building) and the Round House.

The now demolished mansion of Ashwick Grove was arguably closer to Oakhill than its neighbour. The mansion was the home of John Billingsley of Ashwick, the grandson of Nicholas Billingsley the younger, a dissenter who was minister at Ashwick from 1699 to 1729. Billingsley is most remembered in the village as the owner of the Oakhill Brewery, established in 1761, and known for its Oakhill Invalid Stout. The brewery owned two public houses in the village, the White Horse and the Moon, and the present Oakhill Inn, first mentioned in 1802, is probably the successor of one of these.

The village had its own narrow-gauge railway, built in 1904, to take beer barrels to the Somerset & Dorset Railway at nearby Binegar. The railway had a 2'6" gauge and operated two 0-4-0T locomotives, the 'Mendip' and the 'Oakhill', which were painted in an olive green livery. Traces of the railway can still be seen in the surrounding area.

The railways made a brief reappearance in the village of Oakhill in the 1980s, albeit in a miniature form. In the grounds of Oakhill Manor, the manor's owner, Walter Harper, opened a 'ride on' replica collection to the public. Among the engines, which towed thousands of people during their time there, was a 'Pacific' replica locomotive called Robin Hood. Oakhill Manor closed its doors to the public in 1985 and the engines were dispersed around the country.

William Braine, an explorer on Franklin's lost expedition to find the Northwest Passage, was born in the village.

In June 2022, the BBC noted that Oakhill residents were hosting a considerable number of refugees under the UK government's Homes for Ukraine scheme: 30 people who were sponsored by over ten families.
