= Midsomer Norton Town Hall =

Municipal building in Midsomer Norton, Somerset, England

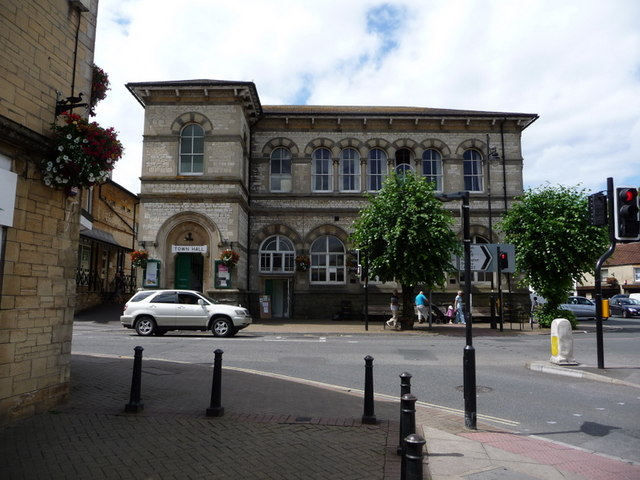
- Midsomer Norton Town Hall

- Shown in Somerset
- 51.2854°N 2.4829°W
- Location: The Island, Midsomer Norton

History
- Built: 1860

Site notes
- Architect: Foster and Wood
- Architectural style: Italianate style

Listed Building – Grade II
- Official name: Town Hall
- Designated: 21 December 1979
- Reference no.: 1115167

Midsomer Norton Town Hall is a municipal structure at The Island, Midsomer Norton, Somerset, England. The structure, which serves as the meeting place of Midsomer Norton Town Council, is a Grade II listed building.

== History ==
The building was commissioned by a group of businessmen led by a local brewer proprietor, Thomas Harris Smith, who set up a private company to finance and build a market hall for the benefit of the town.

The foundation stone for the new building was laid by the former member of parliament, Captain George Scobell, on 2 May 1859. It was designed by Foster and Wood in the Italianate style, built by Messrs Shearn and Stamp in limestone rubble at a cost of £1,500 and was officially opened on 18 September 1860. The design involved an asymmetrical main frontage with six bays facing onto The Island; the left hand bay, which was projected forward, featured a round headed doorway with a blind panel in the tympanum on the ground floor and a round headed window on the first floor. The main section to the right was originally arcaded with five openings so that markets could be held, while the first floor was fenestrated by an arcade of five linked round headed windows flanked by two separate round headed windows. Internally, the principal room was the assembly room on the first floor.

Ownership of the private company which had developed the market hall passed to William Beauchamp of Norton House in the late 1880s. Activities in the market hall included corn markets held on a monthly basis and cattle markets held annually in April each year. Following significant population growth, largely associated with the status of Midsomer Norton as a market town, the area became an urban district in 1894. The new council met in the market hall and, following the death of William Beauchamp, the council acquired a lease over the building from his estate in 1903. A programme of renovation works to establish a council chamber and county court offices was carried out at a cost of £2,500 and completed in 1906: the council acquired ownership of the building in 1910, but it ceased to be the local seat of government when the enlarged Norton Radstock Urban District Council was established at council offices further to the east along the High Street in 1933.

Parts of the town hall were used by the Salvation Army from the early 20th century, as a labour exchange from the 1930s and then as workspace for the local council from the mid-1960s. Following a local government reorganisation in 1974, ownership of the building passed to Wansdyke District Council and, in 1983, management of the building became the responsibility of the Sarah Ann Trust, named after a young girl who had assisted the builders by collecting water from a stream during the construction of the town hall. Ownership of the building was transferred to the new unitary authority, Bath and North East Somerset Council, in 1996, and, after a lift had been installed, a Citizens Advice office was established on the ground floor in 1997.

During the 2010 general election, the Conservative Party candidate, Jacob Rees-Mogg, had an egg thrown at him at the town hall. After Midsomer Norton Town Council was formed in 2011, the town council established its offices in the town hall and also started using the building as its main meeting place. The building was converted for use as a community cinema under the Palladium name in 2012; permanent cinema equipment was installed in the building in 2013 and the cinema was upgraded in order to be able to show new release films in 2018. In March 2019, ownership of the building was transferred to Midsomer Norton Town Council, who then passed it to a new charitable trust for the benefit of the people of Midsomer Norton.
