= Midsomer Norton =

Town in Somerset, England

Coordinates: 51.2842°N 2.4817°W

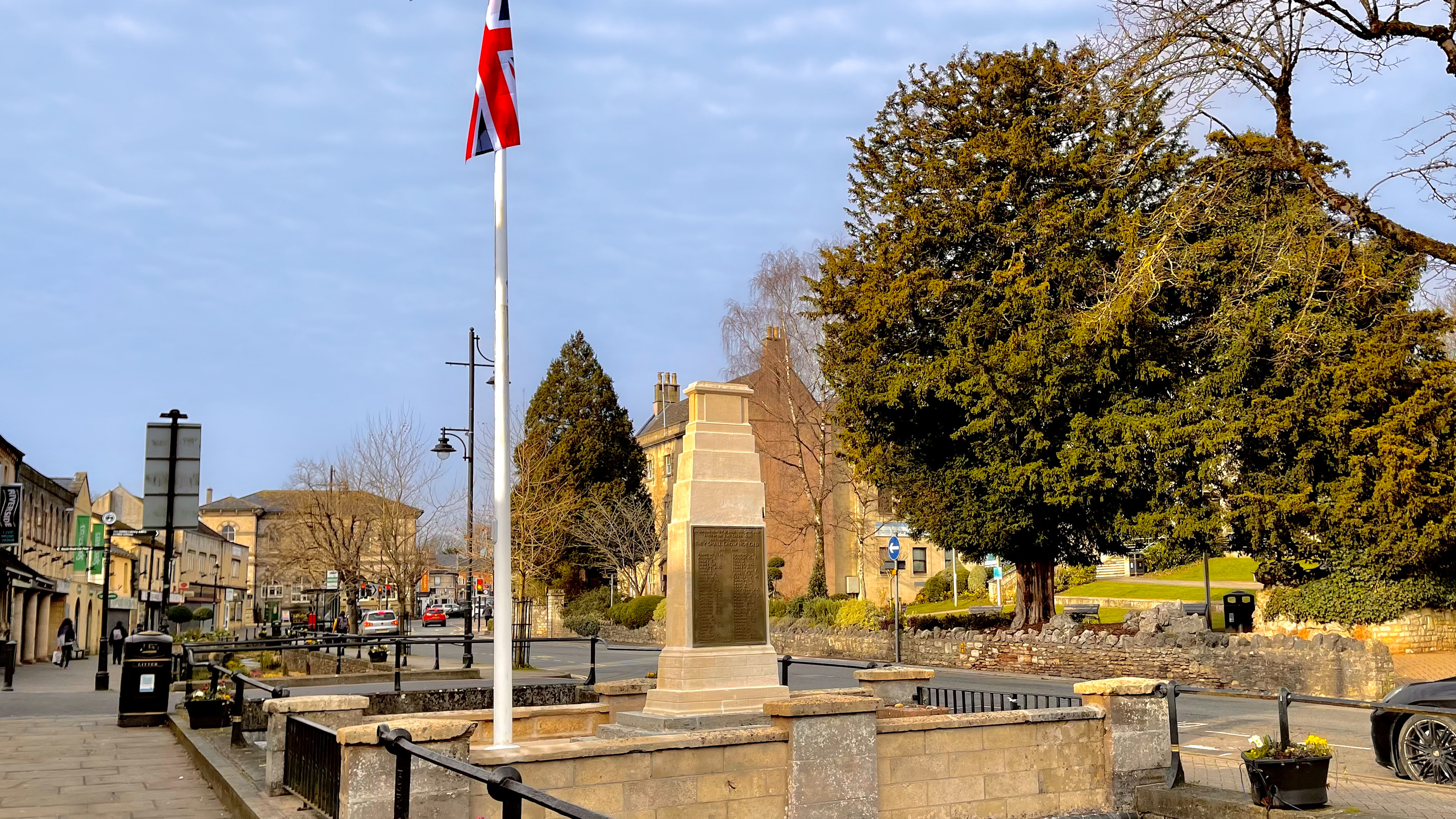
- The War memorial with the River Somer running underneath as at 2022.

- Location within Somerset
- Population: 12,197 (Parish, 2021); 13,745 (Built-up area, 2021)
- OS grid reference: ST664540
- Civil parish: Midsomer Norton
- Unitary authority: Bath and North East Somerset
- Ceremonial county: Somerset
- Region: South West
- Country: England
- Sovereign state: United Kingdom
- Post town: RADSTOCK
- Postcode district: BA3
- Dialling code: 01761
- Police: Avon and Somerset
- Fire: Avon
- Ambulance: South Western
- UK Parliament: Frome and East Somerset
- Website: Midsomer Norton Town Council

Midsomer Norton /ˈmɪdsʌmər ˈnɔːrtən/ is a town near the Mendip Hills in Bath and North East Somerset, England. It lies 10 miles (16 km) south-west of Bath, 10 miles (16 km) north-east of Wells, 10 miles (16 km) north-west of Frome, 12 miles (19 km) west of Trowbridge and 16 miles (26 km) south-east of Bristol. At the 2021 census, the parish had a population of 12,197, and the built-up area as defined by the Office for National Statistics, which extends into the neighbouring parish of Westfield, had a population of 13,745. The town closely adjoins neighbouring Radstock. Between 1933 and 2011 they formed a single administrative area called Norton Radstock.

Midsomer Norton is characterised by the River Somer which runs the length of the town centre. The river itself was regenerated with new plant life during the summer of 2012 in a bid to improve the aesthetics of the town centre. The Town has a long history which can be seen through a number of early churches which remain, but really started to grow and become a transport hub with the development of the Somerset coalfield. For many years the coalmines provided employment for local men until they ceased operations in the 1960s, around the same time that the town's two railway stations also closed. Afterwards, good employment opportunities still remained for the town with elements of the print industry. Some of these plants have also now begun to close, but overall employment levels in the area remain very high.

Midsomer Norton provides shopping and service industries for the surrounding areas and supports several music venues and bands. The town has four primary schools and two large secondary schools. Midsomer Norton is home to a leisure centre, several sports clubs and provides youth opportunities such as Scouts and Guides. It has been the birthplace or home to several notable people.

== History ==
=== Name ===
"Norton" means 'northish enclosure' from the Old English, while the use of its forename to distinguish it from other 'Nortons' is of late origin and not mentioned until 1334. Sources point to the town being situated midway between two branches of the River Somer; the Somer itself and Wellow Brook, which joins the Somer a short distance to the east near Radstock.

The spelling "Missomerys Norton" may be a variation.

Eilert Ekwall wrote that the village "is said to be so called in allusion to the festival held at midsummer on the day of St. John, the patron saint."

John Wesley wrote of the appalling local road conditions which ensured it was reachable "only in midsummer." As Simon Winchester notes in his book The Map that Changed the World, "...the roads on this part of Somerset were atrocious, thick with mud and as rough as the surface of the moon".

==== 'Norton Canonicorum' and the priory ====
In some church records the town is referred to as 'Norton Canonicorum' as an alternative to Midsomer Norton, and this may be because of the local Priory's link to Merton Priory in London until the dissolution of the monasteries in 1538.

=== Prehistory ===
The area at what is now Langley’s Lane in Midsomer Norton was an important and rare area of Mesolithic activity focused around an active tufa spring.

=== Roman ===
The Fosse Way runs through the south-western edge of the town between Westfield, Somerset and Stratton-on-the-Fosse.

=== Middle Ages ===
The parish was part of the hundred of Chewton.

Following the Norman Conquest William the Conqueror gave large parts of north Somerset, including the manor of Norton to Geoffrey de Montbray, bishop of Coutances, and Norton was held under him by Ulveva. From about 1150 until 1300 the manor was held by Alured de Lincoln. From 1387 the manor was held by the family of Thomas West, 1st Baron West and his descendants.

=== 18th and 19th century: mining and landmarks ===
The Duchy of Cornwall owned most of the mineral rights around Midsomer Norton and various small pits opened around 1750 to exploit these. Coal mining in the Somerset coalfield gave the town and area its impetus as an industrial centre.

Around 1866 an obelisk Crimean War monument with two marble plaques, was built at the site of St Chad's well, by the mother of Frederick Stukeley Savage for the benefit of the poor. The obelisk was in the grounds of Norton House, a Georgian mansion built by Thomas Savage, an investor in coalmines in the area, in 1789. The house itself has since been demolished but other features of its estate are still visible at Silver Street Nature reserve (see below).

== Governance ==
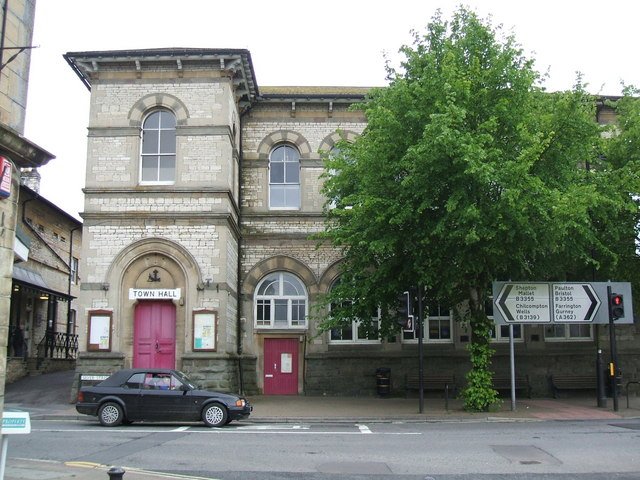
Midsomer Norton Town Hall

There are two main tiers of local government covering Midsomer Norton, at parish (town) and unitary authority level: Midsomer Norton Town Council and Bath and North East Somerset Council. The latter is a member of the West of England Combined Authority, led by the directly elected Mayor of the West of England. The town council is based at Midsomer Norton Town Hall at the corner of The Island and High Street. The building was built in 1860.

For national elections, Midsomer Norton forms part of the Frome and East Somerset constituency.

=== Administrative history ===
Midsomer Norton was an ancient parish in the Chewton hundred of Somerset. As well as the town itself, Midsomer Norton parish included the hamlets of Welton and Clapton, and also had an exclave covering the western side of the village of Stratton on the Fosse. The settlements of Clandown and Westfield both straddled the boundaries between Midsomer Norton and Radstock parishes.

The parish of Midsomer Norton was made a local government district in 1868, administered by an elected local board. Such districts were reconstituted as urban districts under the Local Government Act 1894.

Midsomer Norton Urban District and the neighbouring Radstock Urban District were abolished in 1933, with their areas merging to become a new Norton Radstock Urban District. Some adjustments were made to the boundaries with neighbouring parishes as part of the same reforms. The detached part of Midsomer Norton parish was added to Stratton on the Fosse, and the Clapton area was transferred to Ston Easton parish. The neighbouring parish of Writhlington was also abolished, with the northern part around the village included in the new Norton Radstock district, and the more rural southern part of that parish transferred to Kilmersdon. There were also more minor adjustments to the boundaries with the neighbouring parishes of Kilmersdon and Paulton.

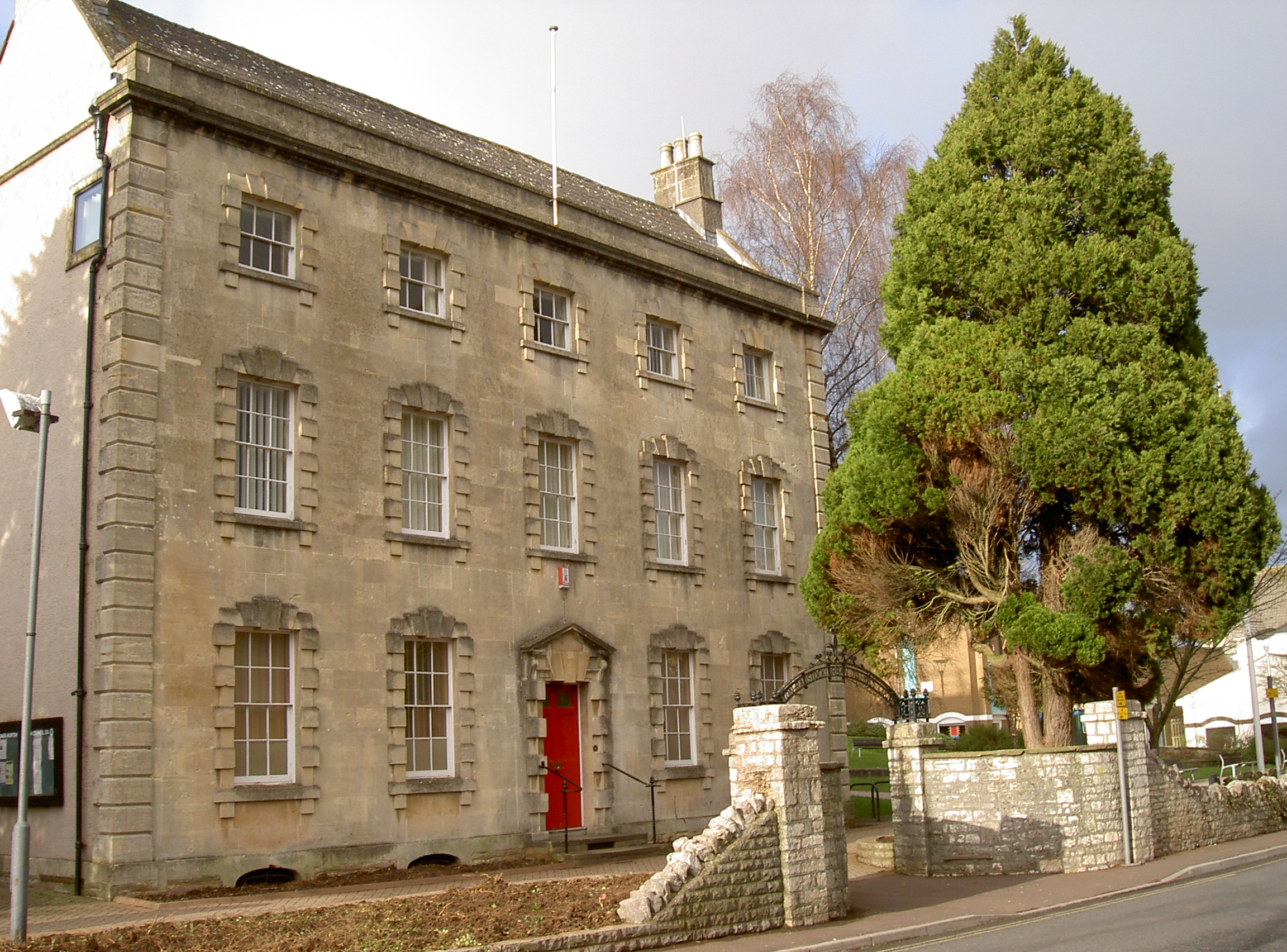
The Hollies, 19 High Street, Midsomer Norton: bought in 1937 to serve as Norton Radstock Urban District Council's headquarters

The new Norton Radstock Urban District Council chose to base itself in Midsomer Norton. In 1937, four years after its creation, the council bought a large 18th-century house called The Hollies at 19 High Street to serve as its headquarters.

Norton Radstock Urban District was abolished in 1974 under the Local Government Act 1972 and the area became part of the new Wansdyke district in the new county of Avon. A successor parish called Norton Radstock was created as part of the 1974 reforms, covering the former urban district.

Wandsyke and Avon were abolished in 1996, when the parish of Norton Radstock became part of Bath and North East Somerset. For ceremonial purposes, the area was restored to Somerset at the same time.

The parish of Norton Radstock was abolished in 2011, being split into three new parishes called Radstock, Westfield, and Midsomer Norton. The new parish council for Midsomer Norton took the name Midsomer Norton Town Council.

== Geography ==
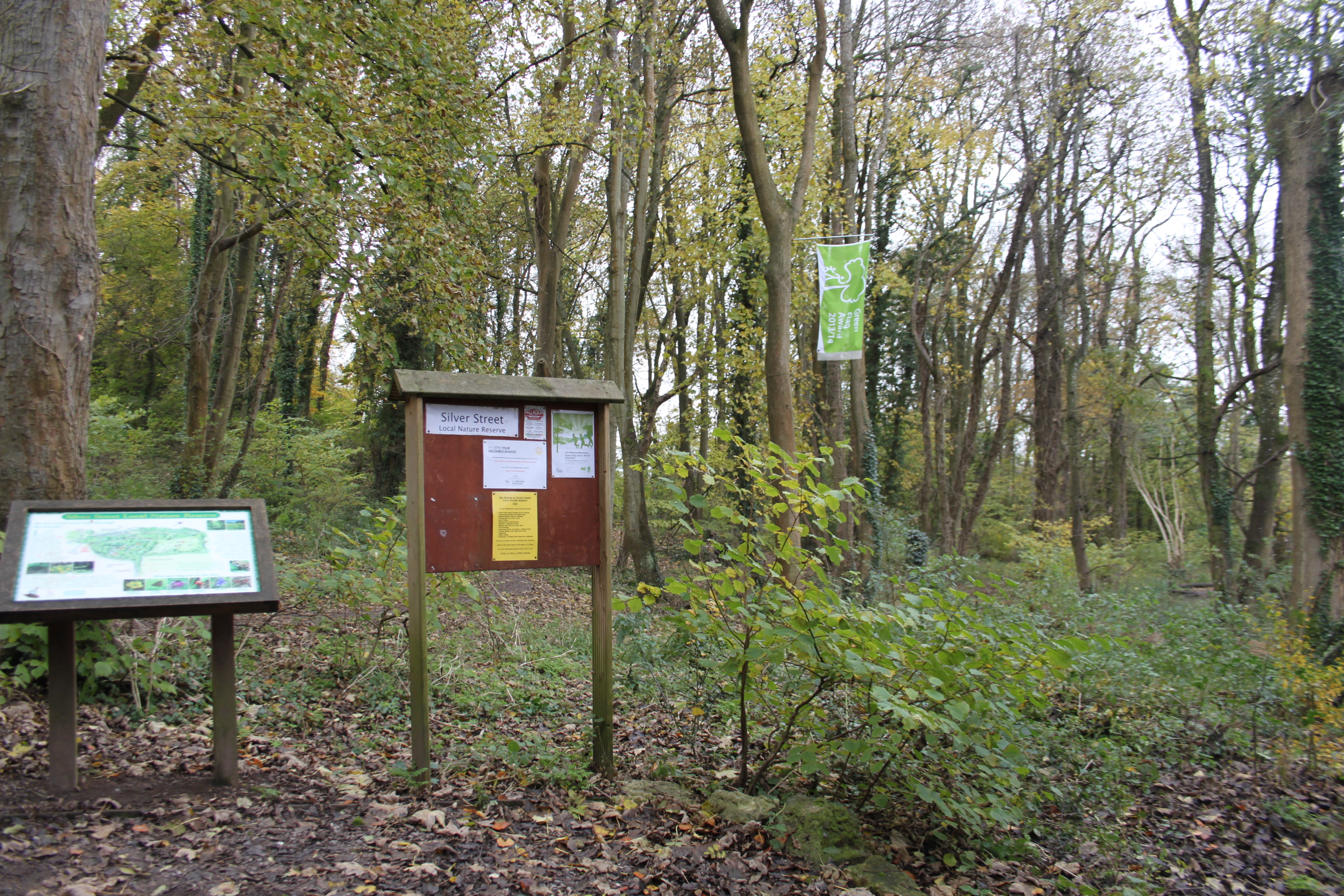
Silver Street local nature reserve

The main geological feature in this area of the Mendip Hills south of Hallatrow consists of Supra-Pennant Measures which includes the upper coal measures and outcrops of sandstone. The relics of the industrial past are very evident within the area, including the distinct conical shape of the Old Mills batch overlooking the town. Midsomer Norton lies on the River Somer which rises to the west of Chilcompton and on the Wellow Brook which rises near the village of Ston Easton. The town therefore occupies two valleys of the Mendip Hills and these merge west of Radstock. The combined river then flows east reaching the River Avon near Midford, thence to Bath and through Bristol into the Bristol Channel at Avonmouth.

On the southern fringes of the town is the 2 hectares (4.9 acres) Silver Street Local Nature Reserve, on the site of the estate of Norton House, an eighteenth century mansion built by the coalmine-owning Savage family but demolished in 1937-8. It contains a broad-leaf woodland around several ponds, a restored nineteenth-century wellhead that supplied water to the house, and a grassland field. The woodland is leased to the Somerset and Dorset Heritage Railway Trust by Bath and North East Somerset Council and the meadow in the stewardship of Somervale School.

Along with the rest of South West England, the Midsomer Norton has a temperate climate generally wetter and milder than the rest of England. The annual mean temperature is about 10 °C (50 °F) with seasonal and diurnal variations, but the modifying effect of the sea, restricts the range to less than that in most other parts of the United Kingdom. January is the coldest month with mean minimum temperatures between 1 °C (34 °F) and 2 °C (36 °F). July and August are the warmest, with mean daily maxima around 21 °C (70 °F). In general, December is the dullest month and June the sunniest. The south-west of England enjoys a favoured location, particularly in summer, when the Azores High extends its influence north-eastwards towards the UK.

Cloud often forms inland, especially near hills, and reduces exposure to sunshine. The average annual sunshine is about 1,600 hours. Rainfall tends to be associated with Atlantic depressions or with convection. In summer, convection caused by solar surface heating sometimes forms shower clouds and a large proportion of the annual precipitation falls from showers and thunderstorms at this time of year. Average rainfall is around 800–900 mm (31–35 in). About 8–15 days of snowfall is typical. November to March have the highest mean wind speeds, with June to August having the lightest; the prevailing wind direction is from the south-west.

== Midsomer Norton flood alleviation scheme ==
For many years, the centre of Midsomer Norton was prone to flooding. Sometimes several times a year, the Somer rose up during prolonged rainfall and flooded shops, particularly where the High Street is at its lowest point in the middle between Martin's newsagent and the former Palladium cinema.

To prevent future deluges, a major flood alleviation tunnel — completed in 1977 – was constructed beneath the high street to remove excess water when the town centre was threatened with flooding. The infrastructure comprises a sluice gate situated at the top of the high street near Somervale School through which the water is carried under the town via a pre-cast concrete culvert several metres in diameter to an outlet further downstream at Rackvernal. Since it began operation, no flooding has occurred to the high street and an Environment Agency report confirms that the relief scheme remains in good condition and continues to serve to its 100-year standard.

Despite the success of the scheme, some outlying areas of the town are now rated at increased risk of flooding from Wellow Brook due to climate change and the increased provision of housing in the vicinity. In 2008 a new monitoring station was installed at nearby Welton through which data on water pressure and flood levels can be collected via metal tubes placed in the river linked to a telemetry box. This facility is now providing the Environment Agency with extremely useful information for use in future assessments of flood risk.

== Industry and commerce ==
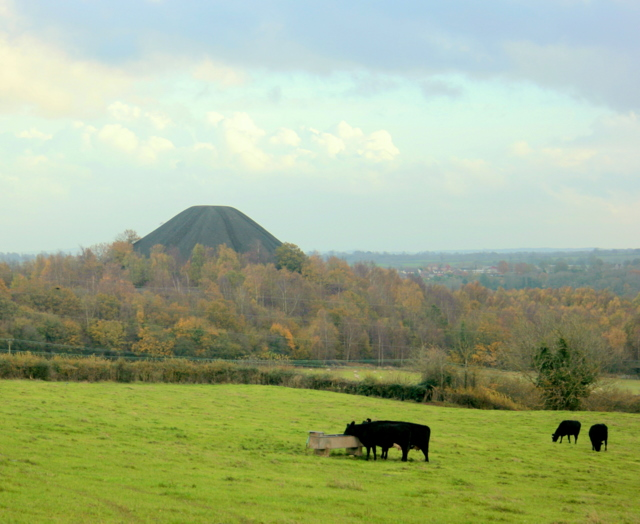
The spoil heap, or batch, from local collieries, north east of the town.

For hundreds of years mining was an important industry for the area, and there were a number of mines in Midsomer Norton, e.g. Old Mills, Norton Hill, and Welton. However the seams were thin and with the hilly nature around, not easily worked. Generations of miners who worked in the difficult conditions of the local collieries are remembered at the Radstock Museum. The coming of the railways, particularly the Bath extension of the Somerset and Dorset Joint Railway (S&D) in 1874, transformed the conveyance of coal out of the area.

The last pit in the town, at Norton Hill, closed in 1966. Despite modernisation in the early 1960s, this final pit lapsed into unprofitability due to local geological difficulties and manpower shortages.

One of the town's best known businesses was Prattens, manufacturer of prefabricated buildings, founded in 1912. It was acquired by Beazer in 1980 and its factory in Charlton Road was demolished in the 1990s.

Midsomer Norton traditionally hosted other industries and became a major manufacturing centre for printing and packaging. Some 2,000 people (27% of total employment) work in this industry locally. Following the decline of mining, these companies expanded on local trading estates and in Welton. The sites of the disused collieries in the area have subsequently been developed for light industry.

In recent years some large local firms have closed or relocated blaming poor transport links. Packaging company, Alcan Mardon closed in 2006, although its social club remains. Polestar Purnell, based in nearby Paulton also closed the same year with the loss of 400 jobs. In August 2011, the town's largest remaining employer, Welton, Bibby & Baron, the largest producer of recyclable paper bags in Europe, announced the closure of its site in Welton, which it occupied for 150 years. The company, known locally as ‘Welton Bag’ planned to move to larger premises at Westbury in Wiltshire, but promised to transfer all 400 jobs to the new site.

The business parks remain busy however, and the town and environs has its share of national trading companies including supermarkets and retail outlets. The town's High Street has free parking. Many inhabitants commute to Bath and Bristol for employment and shopping.

Dial-a-Ride services for the elderly and handicapped are well used, along with the local Community minibus set up by the local Rotary Club in 1967 under Midsomer Norton & Radstock Community Service Vehicle Trust. This vehicle is for use primarily by organisations in the area serving the disabled and infirm.

== The railways ==
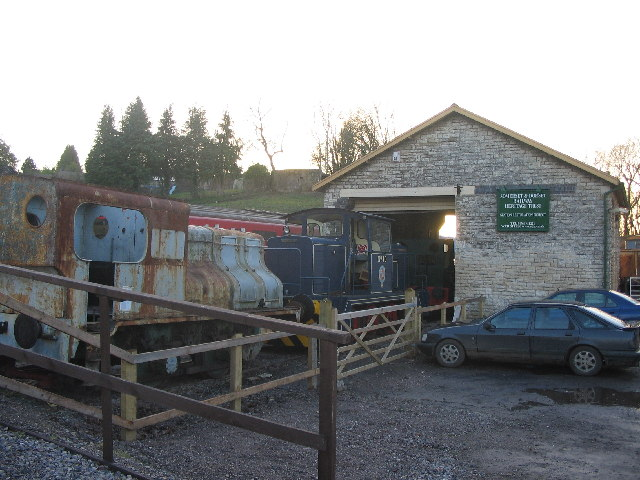
Somerset & Dorset Railway Heritage Centre in former goods shed at Midsomer Norton

The town was previously served by a station on the Somerset and Dorset Railway (S&D) but this closed in 1966, and by a second station on the Bristol and North Somerset Railway at Welton in the valley. The railways were separate, the S&D being administered by the Midland Railway and the London and South Western Railway companies (later the London Midland and Scottish Railway and the Southern Railway) and the North Somerset being run by and then owned by the Great Western Railway. The stations were both called "Midsomer Norton and Welton" (the B&NSR station was originally called just "Welton"); under British Railways, the S&D station was renamed as Midsomer Norton South after a short period as Midsomer Norton Upper; and is currently being restored with occasional open weekends with engines in steam. The Somerset & Dorset Railway Heritage Trust operates steam trains for a mile up to Chilcompton Tunnel. Today the nearest operating railway stations are at Frome (10.5 miles away) and Bath Spa (11 miles), the latter of which is the most easily accessible via regular direct bus routes.

== Culture ==
Midsomer Norton's railway station was mentioned in Slow Train by Michael Flanders and Donald Swann:

No more will I go to Blandford Forum and Mortehoe, on the slow train from Midsomer Norton and Munby Road
No churns, no porter, no cat on a seat, at Chorlton-cum-Hardy or Chester-le-Street
We won't be meeting you, on the slow train ...

Children's author Roald Dahl sold kerosene in Midsomer Norton and the surrounding area in the 1930s. He described the experience in his autobiographical work Boy: Tales of Childhood (published 1984):

My kerosene motor-tanker had a tap at the back and when I rolled into Shepton Mallet or Midsomer Norton or Peasedown St John or Huish Champflower, the old girls and the young maidens would hear the roar of my motor and would come out of their cottages with jugs and buckets to buy a gallon of kerosene for their lamps and their heaters. It is fun for a young man to do that sort of thing. Nobody gets a nervous breakdown or a heart attack from selling kerosene to gentle country folk from the back of a tanker in Somerset on a fine summer’s day.

The Waugh family connection with Midsomer Norton began when Dr Alexander Waugh, father of Arthur Waugh and grandfather of Evelyn Waugh and Alec Waugh, moved in 1865 to Island House, which had been built in the early eighteenth century, in The Island in the centre of the town. The family later moved to a house in Silver Street. As a boy, Evelyn Waugh spent his summer holidays in Midsomer Norton with his maiden aunts. He later described his visits there: "I suppose that in fact I never spent longer than two months there in any year, but the place captivated my imagination as my true home never did."

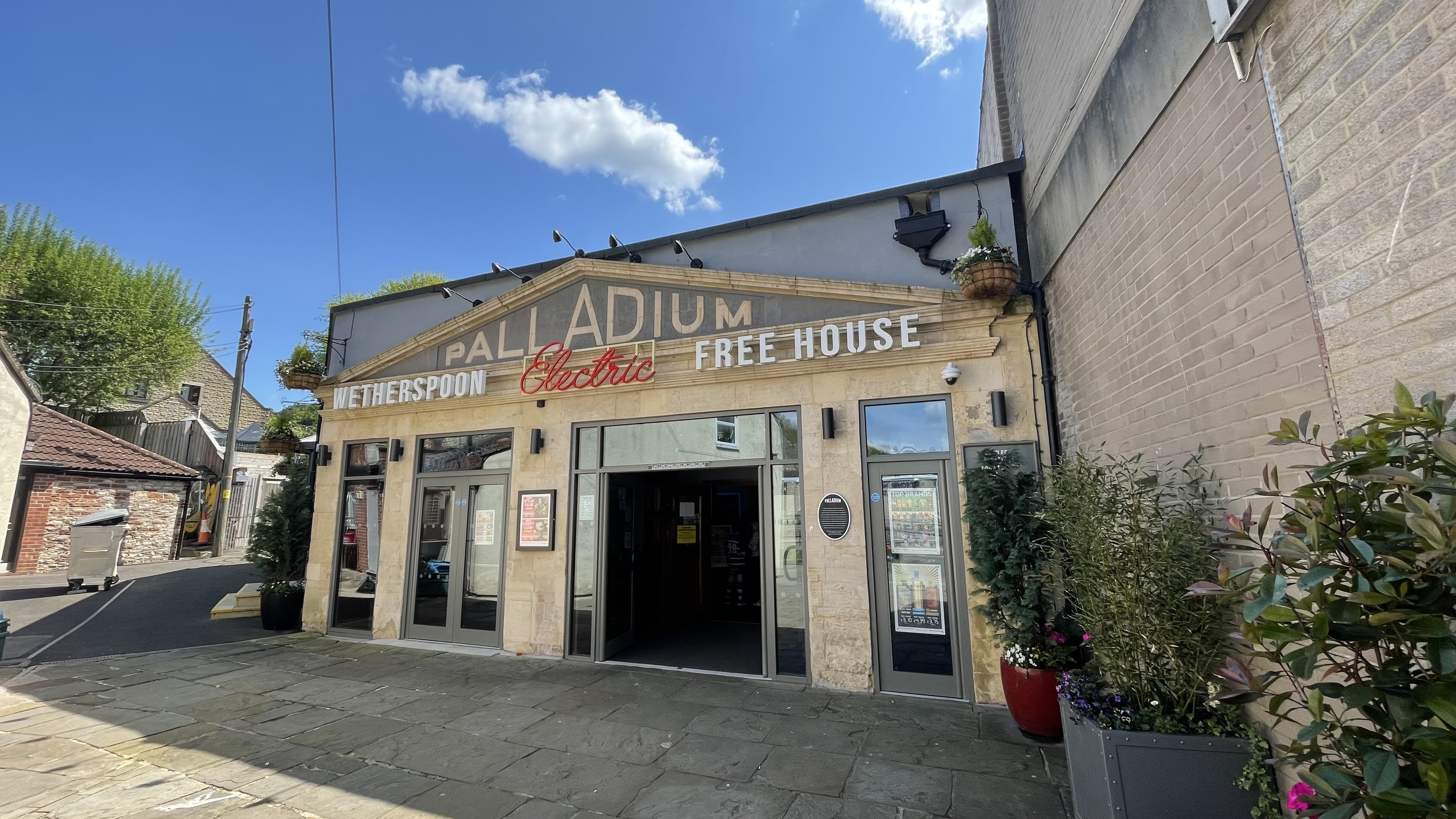
The Palladium cinema after the 2018 restoration and re-opening as a Wetherspoon's pub

The Palladium cinema was opened as the Empire in 1913 in a building which had previously been a brewery. It closed in 1993 and various attempts were made to turn it into a club and shop, before Wetherspoons announced in January 2015 that they had acquired the site and intended to seek planning and licensing permission to convert it to a pub, which opened in September 2018 with the name of the Palladium Electric in reference to one of the cinema's former names. The town was left without cinema for almost two decades. Cinema was brought back to the town under the Palladium name in 2012 with a new community cinema at the Town Hall. In 2013, permanent cinema equipment was installed in the building and an upgrade in 2018 saw new release cinema return to the town for the first time in 25 years.

The town is commemorated in "The Sheriff of Midsomer Norton", by Somerset band The Wurzels. Midsomer Norton hosts the only unofficial carnival on the West Country Carnival circuit. Originally, floats travelled through the main High Street but road improvements put paid to the larger vehicles and for many years the procession was held on the main Fosseway through Westfield. Since 2014 however, the carnival has returned to the High Street following changes made to the traffic layout.

The town's free newspaper is the Midsomer Norton, Radstock & District Journal. The other local weekly paper is the Somerset Guardian, which is part of the Daily Mail and General Trust. The monthly magazine, the Mendip Times, also includes local features.

Somer Valley FM (97.5FM and online) is the Community Radio for the district. There is also a community website called Midsomer Norton People where residents can discuss local issues.

In 2016 the town's first LGBT Pride celebration event was held at The Wunderbar, which had previously been host to comedians Matt Lucas and Ed Byrne. The event was held again in 2017.

=== Music scene ===
Throughout the 1990s and early 2000s, the alternative live music and DJ scene in Midsomer Norton flourished with the help of venues such as The Stones Cross and The Wunderbar, which promoted unsigned bands for over 25 years.

On the first Friday of every month the Paradis Palm Court Trio perform free classical concerts in the Town Hall. Choir concerts (male voices in particular) command a local following and the Lions club is a promoter of such attractions usually held in the Methodist or Parish churches.

There are a number of local brass bands. In 2006 Midsomer Norton hosted the European Open Marching and Show Band Championship which saw many bands from all over Europe visit the town.

=== Midsomer Murders ===
Anthony Horowitz, the original writer of Midsomer Murders, borrowed part of the name of the town when he adapted Caroline Graham's Chief Inspector Barnaby series for television in 1997. Although no filming of the show has ever taken place in Midsomer Norton or the surrounding parishes, some names of other nearby locations have been used by the producers in creating their fictional county of Midsomer, including Midsomer Wellow (Wellow), Midsomer Magna (Chew Magna), Midsomer Morton and the main settlement of Causton (Corston). Despite some occasional confusion, there is no other link between Midsomer Norton and the television series.

== Religious sites and communities ==
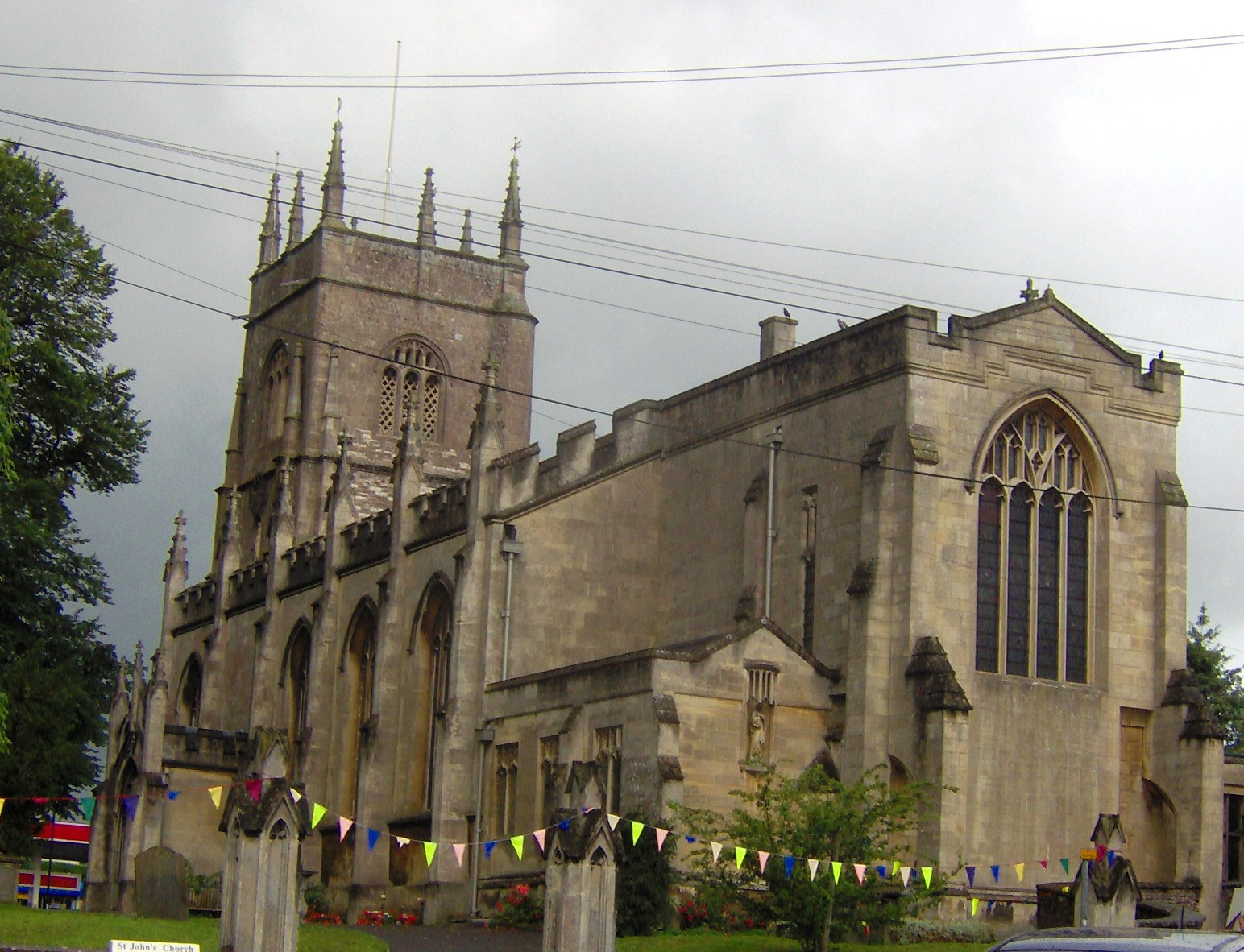
St John's church

The Old Priory, which was a hotel and restaurant, dates from the early to mid 17th century. Another old building is the Catholic Church of the Holy Ghost, which is a 15th-century tithe barn converted by Sir Giles Gilbert Scott. It is a grade II* listed building. For many years, the local Catholic community were served by Benedictine monks from the now defunct Downside Abbey, formerly under the Diocese of Clifton.

The Anglican Church of St John the Baptist has a tower dating from the 15th century, although the upper stages are from the 17th century, but the rest was rebuilt in Gothic Revival style by John Pinch the younger in 1830–1831 and was extended in the 20th century with new chancel and lady chapel. It is a grade II* listed building. The churchyard includes a memorial to the 12 miners killed in 1839 when their rope was severed. St. John's is part of the Diocese of Bath and Wells. The Patronage vests in Christ Church, Oxford.

The Methodist Church in the town's High Street celebrated its 150th anniversary in 2009. In 1746, John Wesley's travelling preachers, based in Bristol, were invited in the mid-1700s to support the local society, the man himself first coming in 1767. By the middle of the 1800s, the congregation had outgrown the original chapel erected in 1775 in Rackvernal Road (now demolished). In the 1990s, the present church building and adjoining hall were totally refurbished and linked, the facilities being well used by the local community. Local Methodists are part of the Bristol District of the Methodist Church and in the North East Somerset & Bath Circuit.

The Baptist Church have their building in Welton but hold their Sunday morning service at Paulton Rovers Football Club now in order to accommodate their congregation.

The Salvation Army meet in their citadel at Stones Cross. There is a successful Scout group, the 1st Midsomer Norton Scout Group based at Radstock Road, providing scouting to around 140 boys and girls per week, and a similarly popular Guide group a short distance away at Rock Hall.

== Education ==
First schools for children up to 11 include Midsomer Norton Primary, St. John's Church of England, Welton Primary, Longvernal Primary, Westfield Primary and Norton Hill Primary. In addition, St Benedict's Catholic Primary School on the edge of Midsomer Norton with a 'Midsomer Norton, Radstock' postal address, is actually part of the neighbouring Somerset Council's education service.

There are two local secondary schools. Norton Hill School has approximately 1,400 students from the age of 11 to 18. In 1999, it became a Technology College and in 2007 changed specialism to become a Maths and Computing College. In 2006, Norton Hill was also awarded a second specialism as a Language College. The school was described by Ofsted in 2007 as outstanding in every respect. The school has received both the Sportsmark Award by Sport England and Artsmark Silver Award. Somervale School which has foundation status, is a specialist Arts College. In 2008, the school was the first in Bath and North East Somerset to win the Eco-Schools Silver Award. The number of pupils on the school roll had fallen to 603. This fall prompted the school to propose a federation with nearby Norton Hill School in March 2009 called the Midsomer Norton Schools Partnership. This is now in place with Alun Williams as the overall head teacher of both schools within the federation. In October 2010 the federation was confirmed as an academy. Somervale School was awarded ‘Good’ in June 2022 and Norton Hill School was awarded ‘Good’ in March 2023. The two schools share a sixth form called the Midsomer Norton Sixth Form which is based across the two school sites.

The town is served by a further education college, the Somer Valley branch of Bath College, in neighbouring Westfield. It serves 1,000 full-time students and 5,000 part-time students. The College has steadily expanded since it opened in the 1940s to serve the Somerset coalfields. As a Community College, it has expanded its range of vocational programmes, and has become an established part of the community. The college works with local employers to provide training programmes that meet the needs of both employers and employees. This ranges from short skills workshops, through to NVQs, BTEC, Higher National Diplomas and apprenticeships.

== Media ==
Local news and television programmes are provided by BBC West and ITV West Country. Television signals are received from the Mendip TV transmitter.

Local radio stations are BBC Radio Somerset on 95.5 FM, Heart West on 102.6 FM, Greatest Hits Radio South West on 102.4 FM and Somer Valley FM, a community based station which broadcasts from the town on 97.5 FM.

The town is served by the local newspaper, the Midsomer Norton, Radstock & District Journal.

== Sport ==
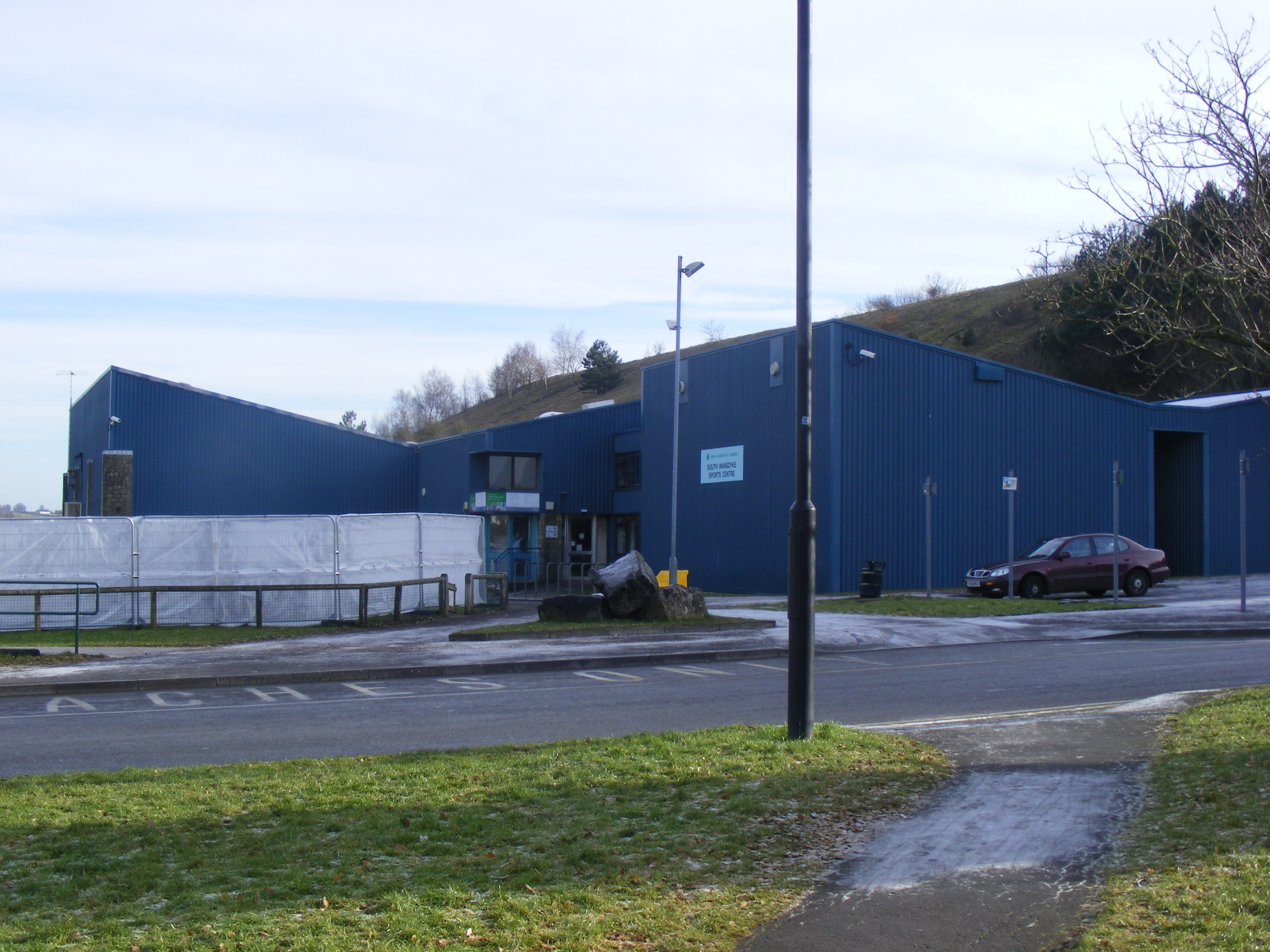
South Wansdyke Leisure Centre

South Wansdyke Leisure Centre provides a wide range of activities including swimming. Norton Hill and Somervale School also have sports facilities used by town and local groups. In 2010, additional leisure facilities were constructed including a skate board park and new children's play area. In 2023, parts of the existing playground were removed and placed on the side of the building where a new playground was erected.

There are several football clubs including Welton Rovers F.C. who play in the Western Football League, Welton Arsenal, and Norton Hill Rangers.

Midsomer Norton has its own Cricket club, as do Midsomer Norton Methodists, and a Rugby union team.

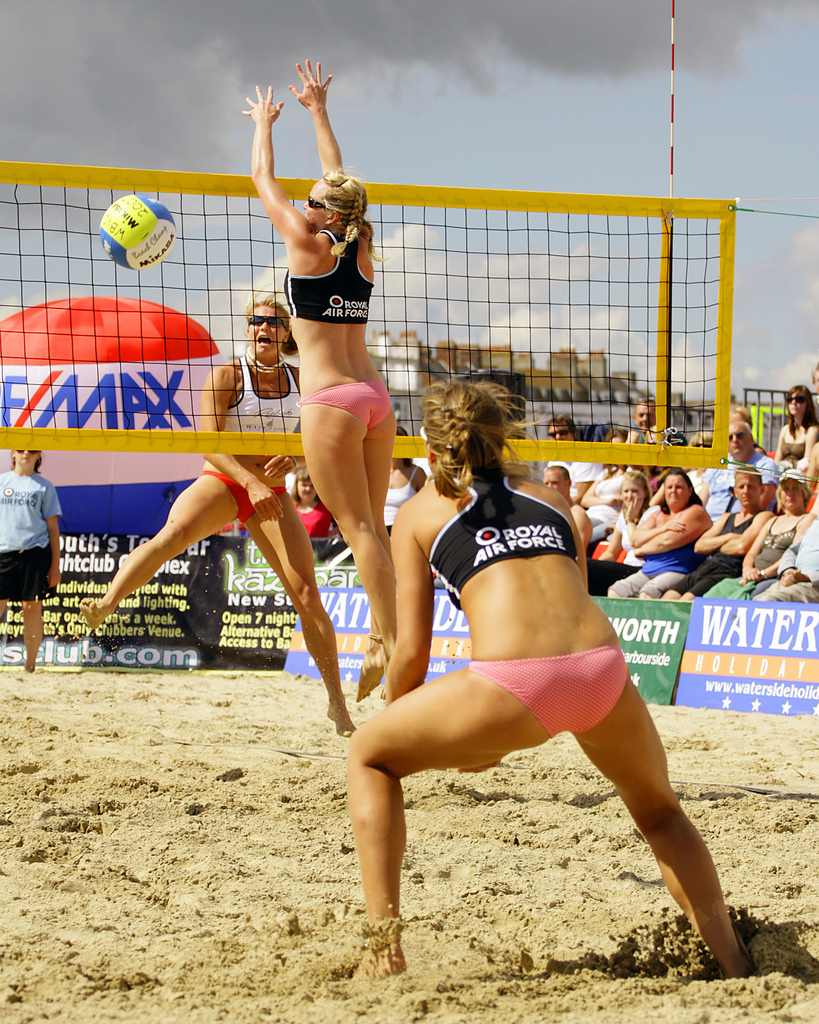
Denise Johns (foreground) in action with her teammate Lucy Boulton at Weymouth, Dorset, 2007

In 2002, the World Professional Billiards Championship was held at the Centurion Hotel, part of L&F Jones, Midsomer Norton.

== Notable people ==
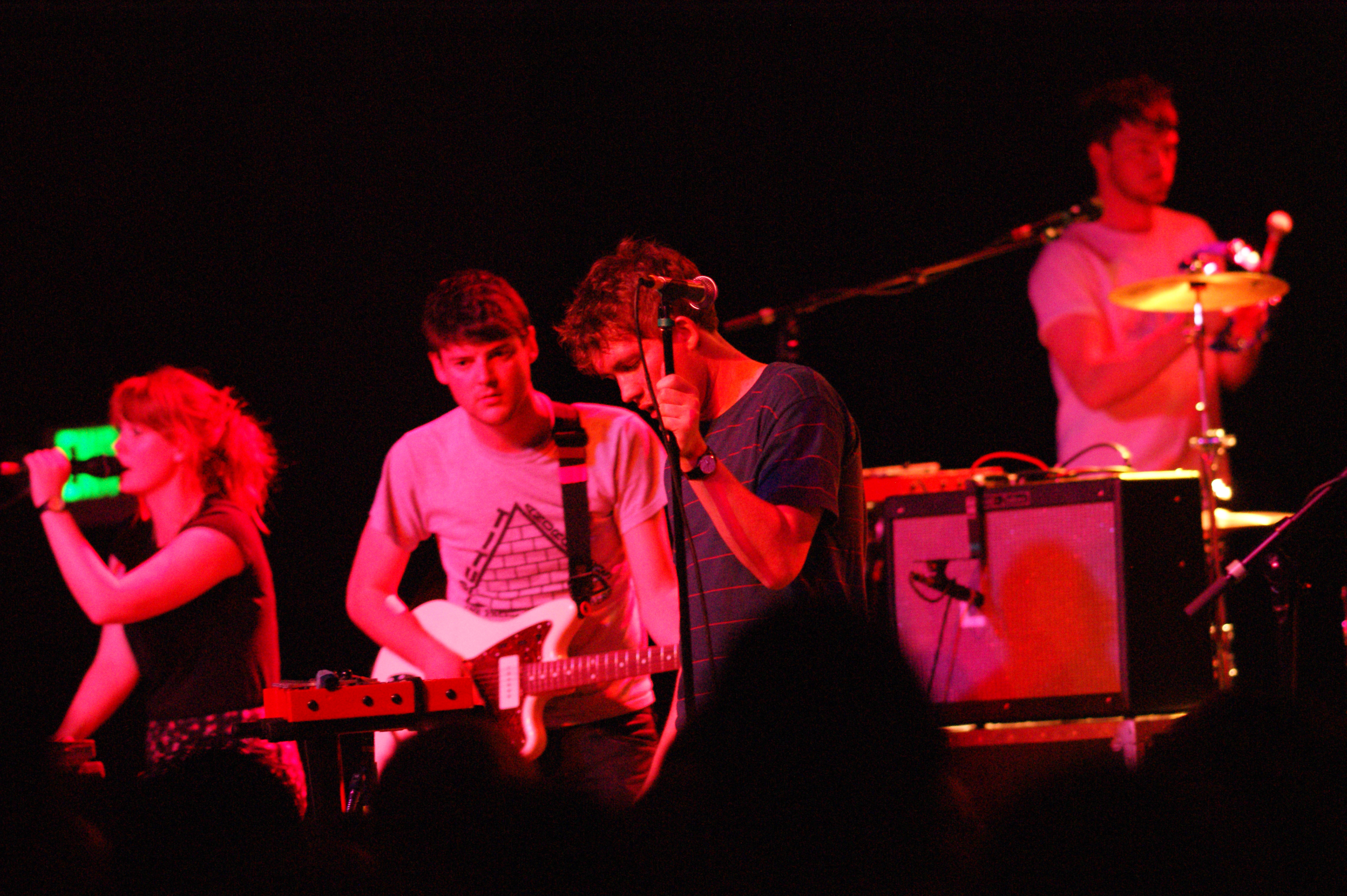
Los Campesinos!, featuring Midsomer Norton natives Kim (far left) and Gareth Paisey (second from right)

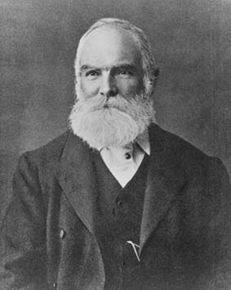
Uriah Maggs

- Peter Alexander (born 1952), actor who appeared in Emmerdale Farm
- Thomas William Allies (1813–1903), historical writer specialising in religious subjects
- Sir Frank Beauchamp (1866–1950), owner of coalmines in the Somerset coalfield
- Joan Beauchamp (1890–1964), suffragette and co-founder of the Communist Party of Great Britain
- Kay Beauchamp (1899–1992), Communist who helped found the Daily Worker
- William Bees (1871–1938), English recipient of the Victoria Cross for services in South Africa
- Arthur Bulleid (1862–1951), antiquarian
- Don Carter (1921–2002), footballer for Bury and Blackburn Rovers
- Walter Cook (1894–1973), footballer for Plymouth Argyle, Brighton & Hove Albion and Stockport County.
- Chloe Davies (born 1998), paralympic swimmer.
- David Fisher (1946–2013), award-winning artist.
- Jody Gooding (born 1981), professional beach volleyball player, lives in the town.
- Frederick Gould (1879–1971) MP for Frome, 1923–24 and 1929–31
- Sir Ronald Gould (1904–1986), General Secretary of the National Union of Teachers
- Elizabeth Hallam-Smith (born 1950), historian and former librarian of the House of Lords Library.
- Anita Harris (born 1942), actor, singer and entertainer.
- Bert Head (1916–2002), footballer for Torquay United and Bury FC.
- Denise Johns (born 1978), professional beach volleyball player for Great Britain who lives in the town.
- Uriah Maggs (c.1828–1913), founder of Maggs Bros Ltd, long-surviving antiquarian bookseller
- Adrian Monk (1917–2004), Falkland Islands politician.
- Professor Leslie Rowsell (L.R.) Moore (1912–2003), Professor of Geology at Sheffield University
- Sedge Moore (born 1958), musician with The Wurzels
- Gareth and Kim Paisey from indie pop band Los Campesinos!.
- Frederick Pratten (1904–1967), cricketer
- George Rowdon (1914–1987), cricketer for Somerset
- Samuel Evans Rowe (1834–1897), Methodist missionary to South Africa
- Ashley Steel (born 1959), business person
- Duncan Steel (born 1955), writer on space science
- Karen Steel (born 1953), geneticist
- Sir Reginald Thatcher (1888–1975), composer and Principal of the Royal Academy of Music
- Dr. Geoffrey Tovey (1916–2001), expert in serology and founder of NHS Blood and Transplant Service
- Chris Urch, award-winning playwright
- Mike Veale, former Chief Constable of Cleveland Police and Wiltshire Police
- Steve Voake, children's author
- Arthur Waugh (1866–1943), author and member of a literary family
- Tim Weaver (born 1977), novelist who attended school there
- Louise Whittock (1896–1951), actress and singer with the D'Oyly Carte Opera Company
- C. J. F. Williams (1930–1997), philosopher
- Maisie Williams (born 1997), actor famous for Game of Thrones, who attended school there
