= L&F Jones =

British company

L & F Jones Holdings Ltd.
- Type: Private company
- Industry: Wholesale, Retail, Leisure
- Founded: 1911
- Headquarters: Westfield, Somerset
- Key people: Richard Jones, Laurence Jones, Peter Jones, Christopher Jones, Dave Jones, Ray D'Arcy, Robin Allen, Mike Byrne
- Products: Wholesale; Groceries; Hotel; Health Club; Golf Course
- Number of employees: 292 (as at 2010)
- Subsidiaries: Jones Food Solutions; Jones Convenience Stores; Best Western PLUS Centurion Hotel
- Website: http://www.lfjones.co.uk, https://www.facebook.com/JCSLocal, https://www.centurionhotel.co.uk/

L & F Jones Holdings Ltd is a company based in Westfield, Somerset, England, that includes a chain of convenience shops, a wholesale food business, and a Best Western PLUS hotel. The retail chain consists of twelve shops in Somerset, Wiltshire, Dorset, South Gloucestershire, and Bristol.

== History ==
=== L & F Jones Holdings Ltd. ===
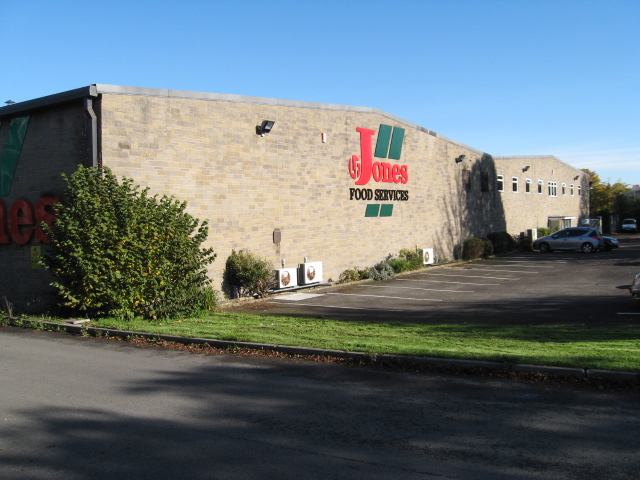
Company headquarters in Westfield, Somerset

L & F Jones Holdings Ltd. was founded by Catherine Lucy Jones in Stratton-on-the-Fosse in 1911. It started trading as L & F Jones, named after Catherine's two daughters Leona and Frances.

In 1929, the shop was replaced by a larger premises, which included a function room for catering dinners and wedding receptions. In 1936, the management was taken over by her eldest son, Basil Leo Jones. Four of Basil’s six sons (Laurence, Christopher, Peter, and Richard) joined the business in the 1960s. Each brother managed a local shop, located at Stratton-on-the-Fosse, Peasedown St John, Paulton, and Trowbridge.

The premises at Stratton-on-the-Fosse became the first wholesale cash and carry in the area. The business moved to premises in Radstock. The four shops were sold to enable the brothers to concentrate on growing the cash and carry business. As the business expanded a catering depot was purchased in Shepton Mallet in 1977.

The company joined Landmark Wholesale, a consortium of independent wholesalers, in 1973 and are one of the group's oldest members. In 1983, the cash and carry relocated from Radstock to its present site in Westfield. This has developed into Jones Food Services, a catering food service business.

L & F Jones Holdings Ltd. purchased the Best Western PLUS Centurion Hotel near Westfield, Somerset (formerly the Fosseway Country Club). The Health Club was added in 2000.

By 2010, the company had 16 shops within thirty miles of the head office at Westfield.

In 2011, L & F Jones celebrated its 100th year, with current and former workers joining a celebration at the Assembly Rooms in Bath to mark the milestone. Among the four hundred people attending was Dorene James, who started working in 1939, aged 14, at Stratton alongside Mrs Jones.

=== Jones Food Solutions ===
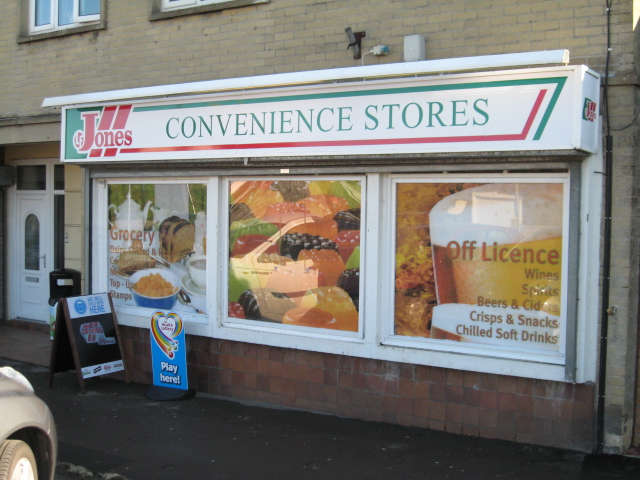
Jones Convenience Store, Fosseway shops, Westfield, Somerset.

The company’s wholesale/catering foodservice business operates from the depot located at its HQ in Westfield, Midsomer Norton, serving customers predominantly in Somerset and Wiltshire.

Jones Food Solutions acquired Radstock's local butchery 'Paul Loader' in 2010.

Landmark Wholesale named Jones Food Solutions as Out of Home Development Member of the Year in 2017.

Jones Food Solutions won a Taste of the West Gold award for their Pork Sausages and their Pork & Cheddar Cheese Sausages in 2017. They also won a Highly Commended award for their Burgers, faggots and meatballs.

Jones Food Solutions added online ordering for their customers, stating "we...make our system even better for our customers"

In 2018, Jones Food Solutions were finalist for a Gold Taste of the West Award for their Marmalade Sausages.

Jones Food Solutions won a Silver Taste of the West Award for their Pork Sausages, a Commended Award for their Pork Sausages, a Commended Award for Cheese Sausages and a Commended Award for their Gourmet Beef Burger in 2019.

Jones Food Solutions became a member of SALSA in 2019. the food and drink approval scheme.

Jones Food Solutions won the Unitas Wholesale Annual Award for 'Foodservice Marketing Member of the Year 2018'.

In April 2020, the company's wholesale and butchery divisions were acquired by Devon-based RD Johns Foodservice.

=== Jones Convenience Stores ===
The company closed down its Jones convenience shop in Peasedown St John in 2008, blaming competition from the recent opening of a Tesco Express shop in the village.

By 2010, the company had 16 shops within thirty miles of the head office at Westfield.

In 2011, L & F Jones celebrated its 100th year, with current and former workers joining a celebration at the Assembly Rooms in Bath to mark the milestone.

The chain had reduced to a total of twelve shops by 2016.

Their Batheaston store returned to a five star food hygiene rating in August 2018 after it was awarded just one star in a food hygiene inspection in March 2018.

L & F Jones Holdings put four convenience stores up for sale in 2018 after deciding to focus on a smaller number of outlets and invest in its wholesale business.

=== Best Western PLUS Centurion Hotel & The Centurion Health Club ===
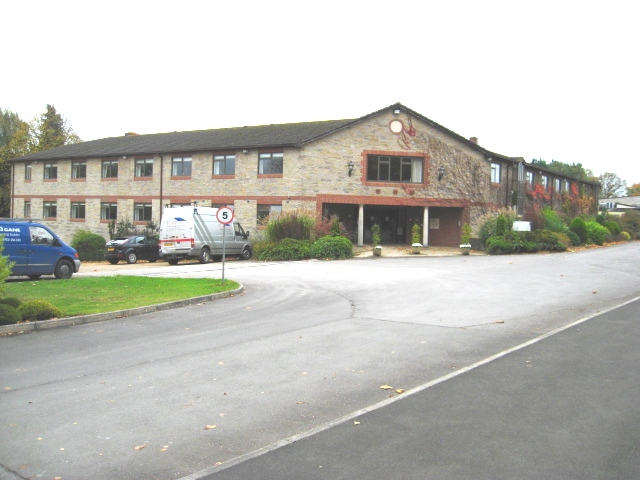
The Best Western PLUS Centurion Hotel near Westfield, Somerset

The Centurion Health Club was added to the premises in 2000.

In 2002, the Centurion was host to the World Professional Billiards Championship.

The Centurion Health Club won a Silver Health Club Award in 2001 and was voted as the second best gym in the South West.

In 2012, for the second year running The Centurion Health Club wins a Silver Health Club Award, voted as the second best gym in the South West.

The Hotels Head Chef Sean Horwood, earned the hotels restaurant two AA rosettes.

On 15 February 2019, family member Fraser Jones (one of the chefs at the Best Western PLUS Centurion Hotel) wins Bronze in the Professional Challenge category at the Annual Chef v Chef Competition.

=== Fifth Avenue Coffee ===
L & F Jones created '5th Avenue Coffee', an American style coffee shop in Trowbridge in 2011. The name was chosen to reflect the company's historical involvement with Fifth Avenue, New York (Basil Jones was an artist who created stained glass for the windows of St. Patrick’s Cathedral).

=== Charity Fundraising ===
In 2011, L&F Jones helped to raise more than £13,000 at two charity events, for Kidney Research UK. They then set a target of £40,000 to raise before the end of the year.

L&F Jones’ staff organised events in support of The Forever Friends Appeal in 2015. The Gala alone raised over £5,000, helping L & F Jones achieve a target of £15,000 for the RUH Cancer Care Campaign. Corporate Officer for The Forever Friends Appeal, Jo Common, commented: “L & F Jones has been an incredible supporter of The Forever Friends Appeal and their very significant donation of just over £15,000 will truly make a difference to the lives of our cancer patients at the RUH.

In 2016, L&F Jones became a Corporate Partner of The Forever Friends Appeal. The Appeal presented the company with a commemorative Corporate Partner plaque to display in their office, to thank them for all their hard work and support in 2015.

In 2018, L&F Jones held its 22nd Annual Charity Gala Dinner at the Best Western Plus Centurion Hotel. They were supporting their charity of the year, ‘The Nicola Corry Support Foundation’. The Gala is held every year, and has raised more than £100,000 for charities. The evening was attended by staff, customers, suppliers and a Nicola Corry Support Foundation representative.
