= Whittock =

Whittock is a surname. Notable people with the surname include:

- Louise Whittock (1896–1951), English actress, singer, and broadcaster
- Nathaniel Whittock (1791–1860), British engraver
- Tecwen Whittock, British game show contestant involved in the Charles Ingram scandal

== See also ==
- Whitlock (surname)
