= Maggs Bros Ltd =

English antiquarian booksellers

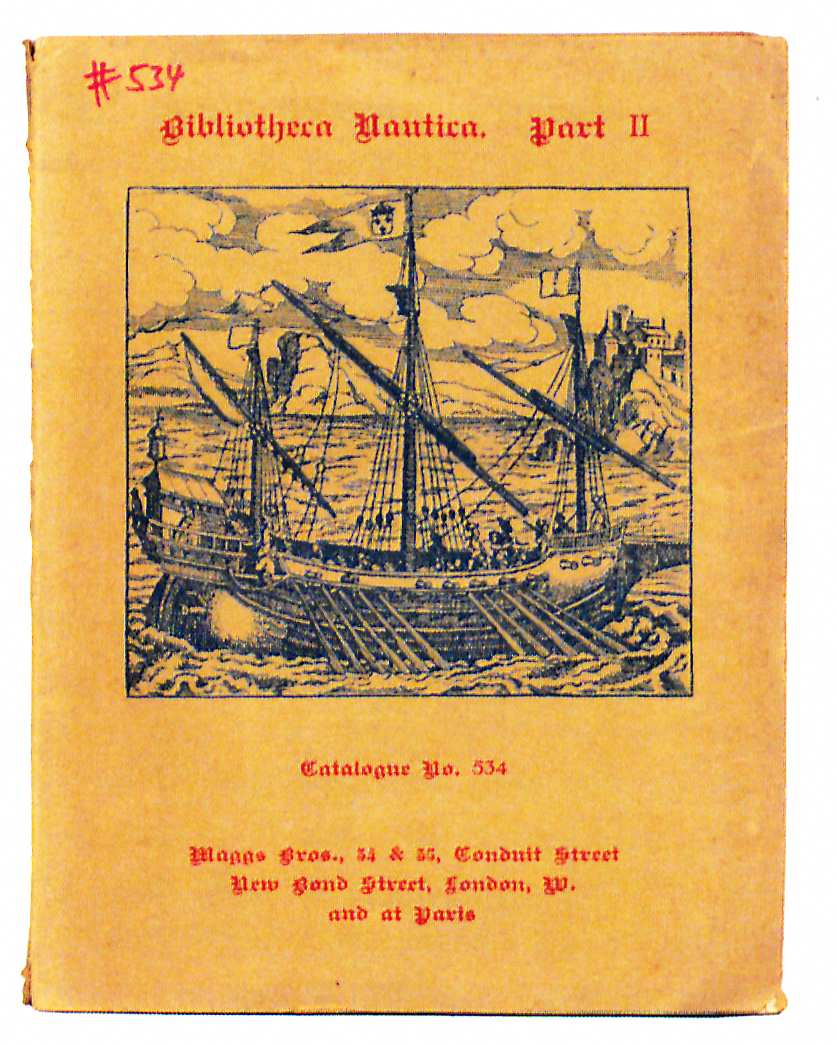
1930 Maggs Bros catalogue

Maggs Bros. Ltd. is one of the longest-established antiquarian booksellers in the world, established in 1853 by Uriah Maggs, born c. 1828 in Midsomer Norton, Somerset. All four of Uriah's sons eventually joined the business, taking over on his retirement in 1894.

The initial Maggs Brothers of the firm's title were Benjamin and Henry, later joined by Charles and Ernest. In 1908 B. D. Maggs served a full (then yearly) term as President of the Antiquarian Booksellers Association (ABA). The firm went through a reorganisation in the early 1990s in which the majority of the equity in the firm was transferred to an employee trust. The Maggs family still owns a significant part of the company: Ed Maggs was the Managing Director from about 1990 to 2024, (becoming Chairman) and his son Ben Maggs plays an important role in the firm. The current Managing Director is Fuchsia Voremberg, who took up the role in 2024. She is also one of the rare book experts on the BBC's Antiques Roadshow.

== Transactions of note ==
In 1916 Maggs Bros bought the penis of Napoleon Bonaparte from the descendants of Abbé Ange Paul Vignali, who had given the last rites and surreptitiously cut off the member in question. Vignali apparently brought it to Corsica, and died in a vendetta in 1828. He passed on the memento to his sister, who at her death passed it on to her son. In 1924, the desiccated item was sold to Dr. A. S. W. Rosenbach, who mounted it in a case of blue Morocco and velvet. In 1927, it was exhibited at the Museum of French Art.

Maggs Brothers pulled off the greatest bookselling coup of the inter-war period, when in 1932 they successfully negotiated with the government of Soviet Russia to acquire not only a Gutenberg Bible, but also the celebrated Codex Sinaiticus.

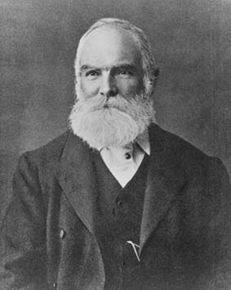
Uriah Maggs

In 1931 Ernest Maggs had travelled to the Soviet Union with a colleague, Maurice Ettinghausen, who was both a bookseller and a scholar. When they saw the priceless Codex Sinaiticus, Ettinghausen remarked to his hosts, "If you ever want to sell it, let me know." Some time later, Maggs received a postcard saying that the Soviet government would be prepared to sell the Codex Sinaiticus for £200,000. The British group offered £40,000; finally, a price of £100,000 was agreed upon, an enormous sum and the highest price ever paid for a book at the time. The British government agreed to pay half the amount and guaranteed the remainder if it were not raised by public subscription.

Maggs have regularly set book price records; in 1947 they bought a second Gutenberg Bible—the Dyson Perrins copy—for £22,000, on behalf of Sir Philip Frere, and a few years later resold it to Mrs. Doheny of California, this latter copy now the only one in Japan. In 1998 the firm bought for £4,200,000 a copy of the first book printed in England, William Caxton's The Canterbury Tales. The price remained the record paid for a printed book as of 2016.

== Warrants and customers ==
Maggs Bros. Ltd. have been antiquarian booksellers by appointment to King George V, King Edward VIII, King Alfonso XIII of Spain, King Manuel II of Portugal, Queen Elizabeth II, and currently to King Charles III.

The great grandson of Uriah Maggs, Bryan, worked for the family firm in the 1960s. One regular customer was John Paul Getty Jr. who bought bindings and books for his library at Wormsley Park where Bryan became librarian in 1989. Other memorable customers included Quentin Crisp.

== Premises ==
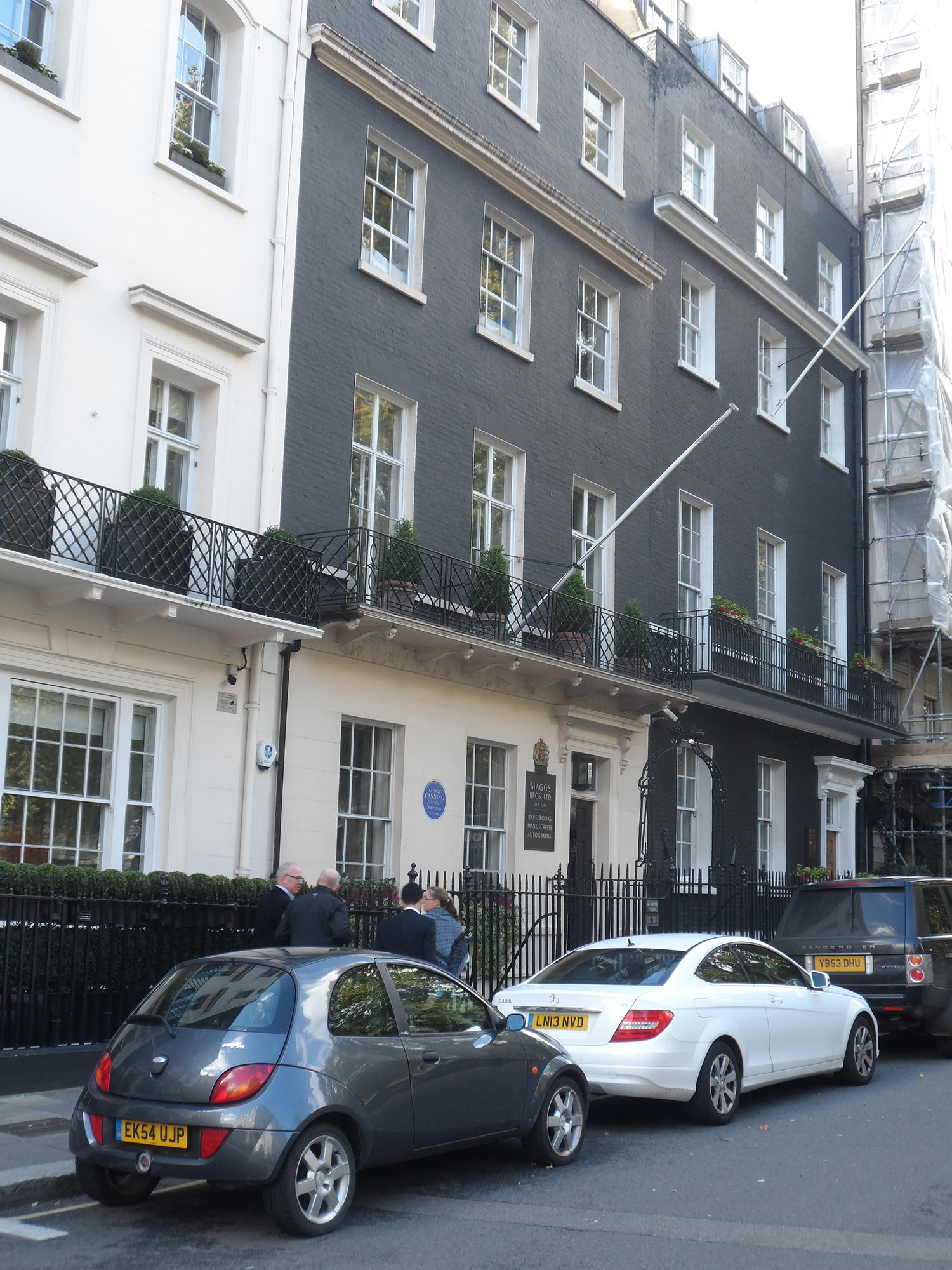
The 50 Berkeley Square premises in 2014

The company was based at 50 Berkeley Square until 2015. In 2016 it moved to 46 Curzon Street, with an additional larger premises later opening in 48 Bedford Square.

== See also ==
- Book trade in the United Kingdom
- Books in the United Kingdom
