= Somer Valley FM =

Coordinates: 51.28°N 2.48°W

- Midsomer Norton; England
- Broadcast area: Midsomer Norton, Radstock and Westfield and the surrounding area
- Frequency: 97.5 MHz

Programming
- Format: Community Radio

Ownership
- Owner: Somer Valley Community Radio Limited

History
- First air date: 2008

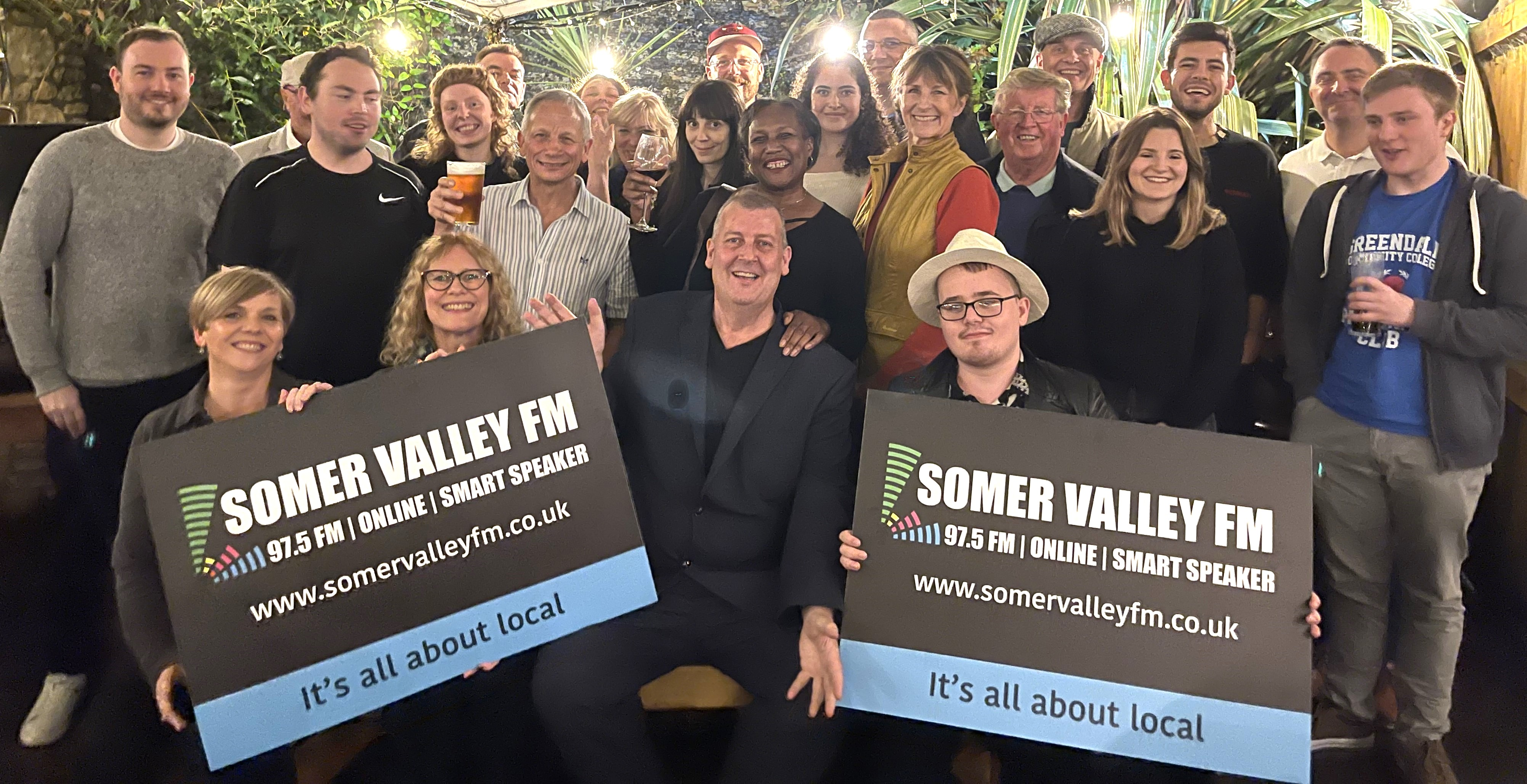
Somer Valley FM volunteers celebrate 15 years as a local radio station.

Somer Valley FM is a local community radio station in North East Somerset that serves Midsomer Norton, Radstock, Westfield and surrounding areas. It was launched in 2008.

== Ownership and structure ==
The station is owned by Somer Valley Community Radio Limited, a not-for-profit organisation that exists for community benefit. The company's Board of Directors has ultimate responsibility for every aspect of the running of Somer Valley FM. There are four Directors: Yvonne Bignall, Dom Chambers, Pete Helmore, and Chris Watt.

The character of the service is shaped by the Key Commitments the station undertakes as a licensed community broadcaster

== Coverage ==
The station broadcasts on 97.5 FM, DAB Radio in Bristol and Keynsham as well as online. Its target area covers Radstock, Midsomer Norton, Westfield, Paulton, Peasedown St John, Kilmersdon, Clutton, Shoscombe, Stratton-on-the-Fosse, Downside, Chilcompton, Farrington Gurney, Gurney Slade, Litton, Ston Easton, Chewton Mendip and Timsbury. Somer Valley FM is the only broadcaster focusing exclusively on this region.

In 2011 local market research company Cognisant Research carried out an audience survey for the station. This found that 48.1 per cent of people living in the station's broadcast area have heard of the station.

== History ==
The station originally grew from a schools radio project organised in Somervale School in 2006. This led to the station's first broadcast on a Restricted Service Licence (RSL) in August that year. This resulted in an application for a full community license which Ofcom awarded in 2007. The station launched on the internet on 20 October 2008 and began FM transmission on 12 January 2009.

The vision for Somer Valley FM was to link education with the community providing opportunities for local people to develop their creativity, skills and confidence to produce local radio.

The idea for the station came from local councilor Chris Watt and Somervale School's Mike Gorman and Mark Kenny who saw the value to school students of learning about radio production. The original board of directors was Mark Kenny, Mike Walker and Chris Watt. Having successfully achieved funding for the project, Somervale's dilapidated former caretaker's house was redeveloped as a radio station with three "on air" studios and good production and training facilities. In July 2008 the directors appointed Dom Chambers, from a background in local radio, as the station manager. The station launched with a grant awarded by the RDA which was match funded by Bath and North East Somerset Council. In November 2008 Dom Chambers was invited to join the board of directors. .

Somer Valley FM is a local radio station that provides opportunities for businesses to raise awareness of products and services with a local customer base. The station is funded by a combination of advertising, sponsorship, grant funding, media training and commissioned programmes.

The station continues to deliver skills based learning opportunities to young people and adults that empower locals with the skills and confidence to make radio, through its partnership with the charity Sound Vision CIO (charity no 1172980). This was launched in 2017 to amplify the training outcomes achieved by Somer Valley FM.

In March 2011 the station were highly commended at The Chairman of Bath and North East Somerset Business Awards in the Not Profit category.

In July 2011 Station Manager Dom Chambers was elected to the national council of the Community Media Association (CMA), which looks after the interests of community media nationally.

In November 2011 Somer Valley FM were awarded Young Volunteer Team of the Year at The Chairman of Bath & North East Somerset Council's annual community awards.

In November 2012 Somer Valley FM, along with Three Ways School in Bath, were Highly Commended in the Youth Team of the Year category at The Chairman of Bath & North East Somerset Council's annual Community Awards.

In November 2013 the Radio Academy named Somer Valley FM as South West Station of the Year.

In December 2013 Somer Valley FM manager, Dom Chambers was appointed Chair of the Community Media Association (CMA) serving for two years. Dom went on to serve a second term 2020-2023.

In May 2017 The Somer Valley Education Trust CIO, known as Sound Vision is registered with the Charity Commission (England & Wales) (Charity number: 1172980). This was launched to build on the training outcomes established by the radio station.

In August 2018 Somer Valley FM named as one of 48 businesses in the UK to receive The Princess Royal Award for Training.

In September 2018 Somer Valley FM received Gold at the Community Radio Awards in the Community Development Project of the Year category for the METS Programme.

In August 2020, Dom Chambers stepped down as the manager and the board appointed Richard Burgess who served 3 years in this role.

In 2021 Somer Valley FM's partnering charity Sound Vision CIO (Charity No 1172980) began delivering educational services to local schools of The Midsomer Norton Schools partnership as an external provider. Students of Norton Hill, Somervale and Writhlington undergoing Alternative Provision with Sound Vision in the training room at Somer Valley FM started making a weekly show for the local radio station.

In August 2023, Somer Valley FM became a fully volunteer oriented community enterprise with management from the Board of Directors and the Volunteers Board which is elected annually by the volunteers.

In November 2024 Somer Valley FM were awarded The King's Award for Voluntary Service. The award is equivalent to the MBE and is the highest award that can be made to a voluntary group.

In April 2025 Bath and Northeast Somerset Council named Somer Valley FM Volunteer Team of the Year in the annual Community Awards.

== Content ==
The station is on air 24 hours a day, seven days a week, offering between ten and twelve hours of live programmes during weekdays.

== Awards ==
2013 Radio Academy South West Station of the Year
2016 Sports Show of the Year at The Community Radio Awards
2018 The Princess Royal Award for Training
2018 Community Development Project of the Year at The Community Radio Awards (For the METS programme)

2024 The King's Award for Voluntary Service

2025 Named Volunteer Team of the Year by Bath & Northeast Somerset Council in the annual Community Awards
