= Frederick Pratten =

Frederick Pratten may refer to:

- Frederick Graham Pratten (1899–1977), politician in New South Wales, Australia
- Frederick Pratten (cricketer) (1904–1967), cricketer who played for Somerset in England
