= Somervale School =

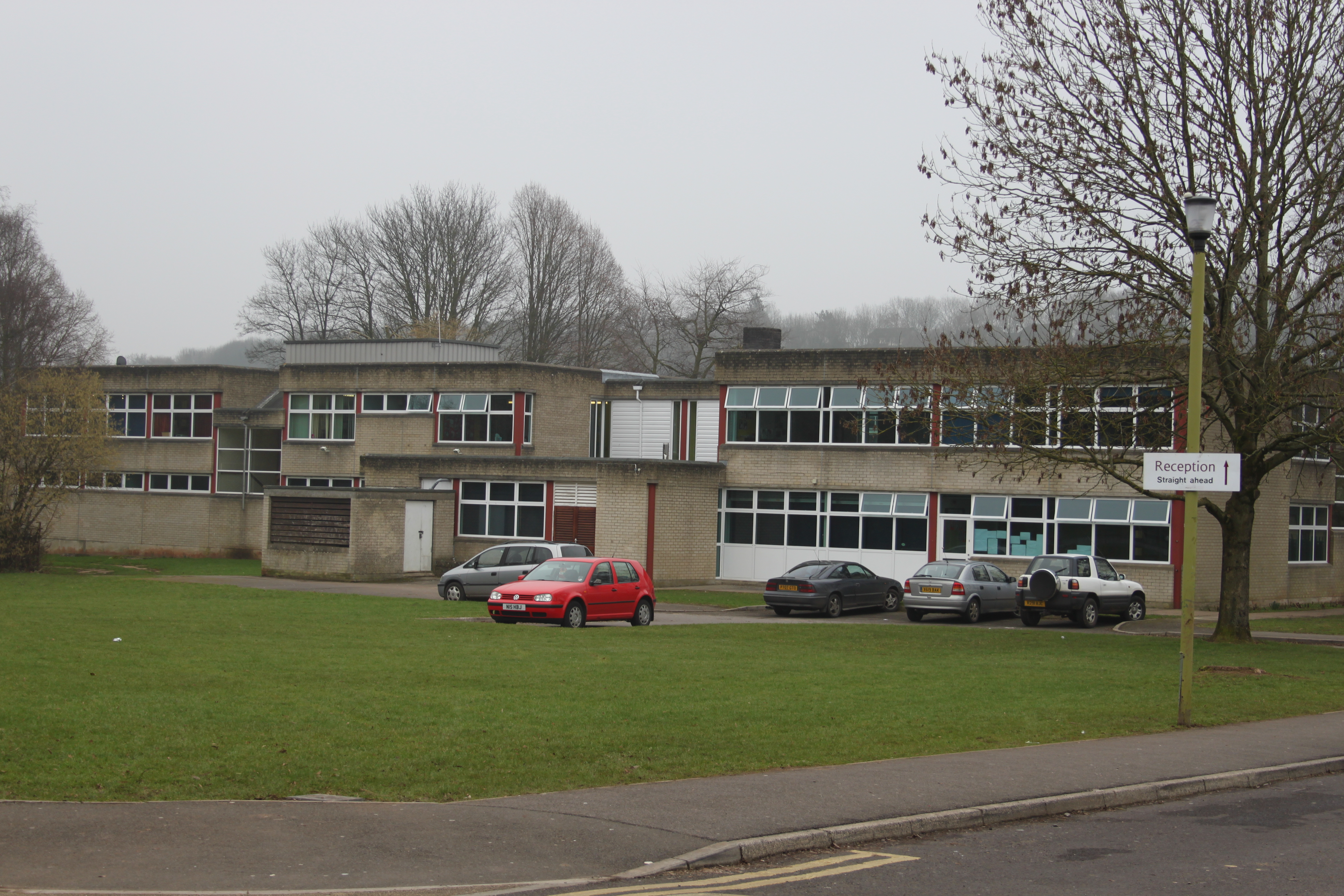

Location
- Redfield Road; Midsomer Norton, Somerset, BA3 2JD; England; 51.2841°N 2.4869°W

Information
- Type: Secondary school Academy
- Motto: Challenge, Learning, Growth
- Specialist: Arts College
- Department for Education URN: 136311 Tables
- Ofsted: Reports
- Head: Alun Williams
- Age: 11 to 19
- Enrolment: 504
- Website: www.somervaleschool.com

Somervale School is situated in Midsomer Norton in Bath and North East Somerset in South West England. The school, which has academy status, is a specialist Arts College. It is one of two schools in the area, providing secondary education to local children and some pupils who live outside the catchment area. The number of pupils on the school roll is 538. A fall in the number of pupils prompted the school to propose a federation with nearby Norton Hill School in March 2009. This later became the foundation for the Multi Academy Trust, named Midsomer Norton Schools Partnership, with Alun Williams as chief executive officer In October 2010, Somervale School became an academy alongside Norton Hill. Somervale was named amongst the 100 top performing schools based on sustained improvement of results by Minister of State for Schools Nick Gibb in March 2012. Somervale School was awarded 'Good' by Ofsted in June 2022. The school shares its sixth form with federated school Norton Hill. The sixth form is based across both sites and is called the Midsomer Norton Sixth Form.

In 2008, the school was the first in Bath and North East Somerset to win the Eco-Schools Silver Award.

The local community radio station, Somer Valley FM, broadcasts from the former caretaker's house on the school premises. It provides opportunities for pupils to gain radio work experience and training.

The school was built on land that was formerly part of the estate of the now-demolished mansion Norton House, built by coal mine investor Thomas Savage in 1789. A Crimean War memorial obelisk built by the Savage family survives in the school grounds to this day.
