= Church of St John the Baptist, Midsomer Norton =

Church in Somerset, England

Church of St John the Baptist
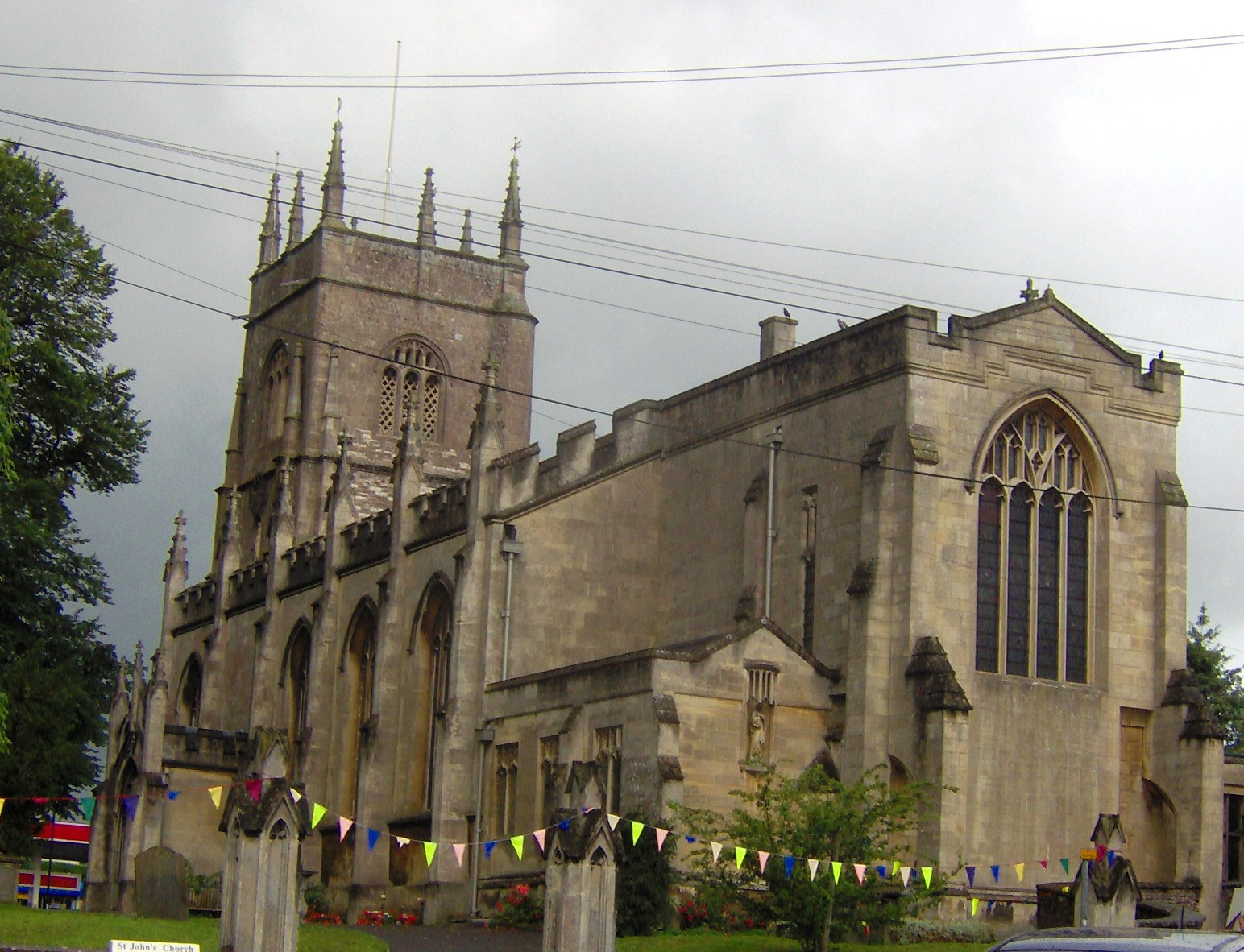

- Location within Somerset
- 51°17′09″N 2°29′07″W
- Location: Midsomer Norton, Somerset, England

Listed Building – Grade II*
- Official name: Parish Church of St John the Baptist
- Designated: 19 May 1950
- Reference no.: 1320561

The Anglican Church of St John the Baptist in Midsomer Norton, Somerset, England, is a Grade II* listed building. St. John's is part of the Diocese of Bath and Wells.

== History ==
The exact date of the building of the church is unknown, but was probably around 1150. The church was under the patronage of Merton Priory in London until the dissolution of the monasteries, but the origin of this link is unknown. A deed of surrender was signed by the prior John Ramsay in 1539 after which Henry VIII bestowed Norton on his Royal Foundation at Oxford. The patronage was passed to Christ Church, Oxford.

The Midsomer Norton Knight is a 13th or 14th century tomb effigy carving which may be the figure of one of the Gourney or Warknell family. The wooden effigy used to sit on the top of a tomb which was demolished in the 18th century. It was moved into the vicarage garden and used to represent Judas, becoming known as the Jack o’ Lent. In 1975 the effigy was rediscovered and moved to the Bristol City Museum and Art Gallery for conservation.

The tower dates from the 15th century, although the upper stages, including the statue of Charles II, are from 1674. The rest of the church was also rebuilt around 1483 and was part funded by Sir John Cheddar. In 1775 John Wesley was allowed to preach at the church.

By the beginning of the 19th century the church had fallen into a state of disrepair and major rebuilding and expansion work in Gothic Revival style was carried out under the direction of the Bath architect John Pinch in 1830–1831, at a cost of £2,829. It was extended in the 20th century with new chancel and lady chapel. The walls and gate piers were added a few years later. In 1878 the layout was altered to increase the seating capacity to 700 people and choirs were introduced for services.

Since 2009 a major programme of restoration has been undertaken. The chancel has been given a new floor and the altar and choir stalls have been moved. Glass doors were constructed in the Lady Chapel and a new glass screen erected at the front of the St Barnabas Chapel. Some controversy arose when it was revealed that proposals to attach a 21 feet (6.4 m) mobile phone mast on the tower were under consideration to help fund the restoration work.

== Architecture ==
The church is made up of a five bay aisled nave and two bay chancel with an additional Lady Chapel. The west tower is of three stages.

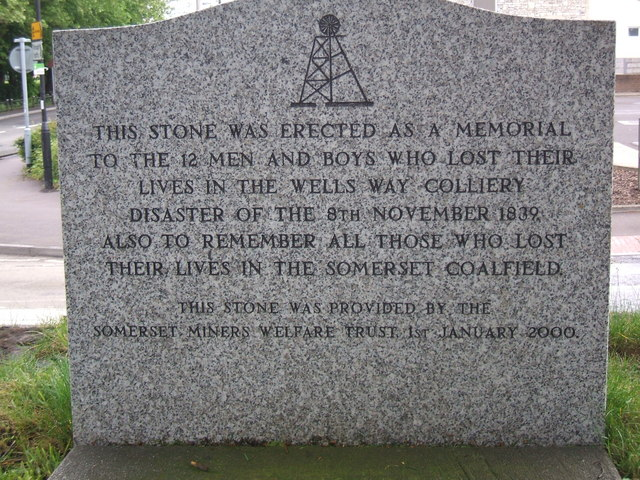
The mining disaster memorial in the churchyard

The font is Norman and the east window includes stained glass by Charles Eamer Kempe which was installed in 1889.

The churchyard includes a memorial to the 12 miners killed in 1839 at Wellsway pit in Westfield when their rope was severed.

== See also ==
- List of ecclesiastical parishes in the Diocese of Bath and Wells
