= F. Pratten and Co Ltd =

Coordinates: 51.2764°N 2.4720°W

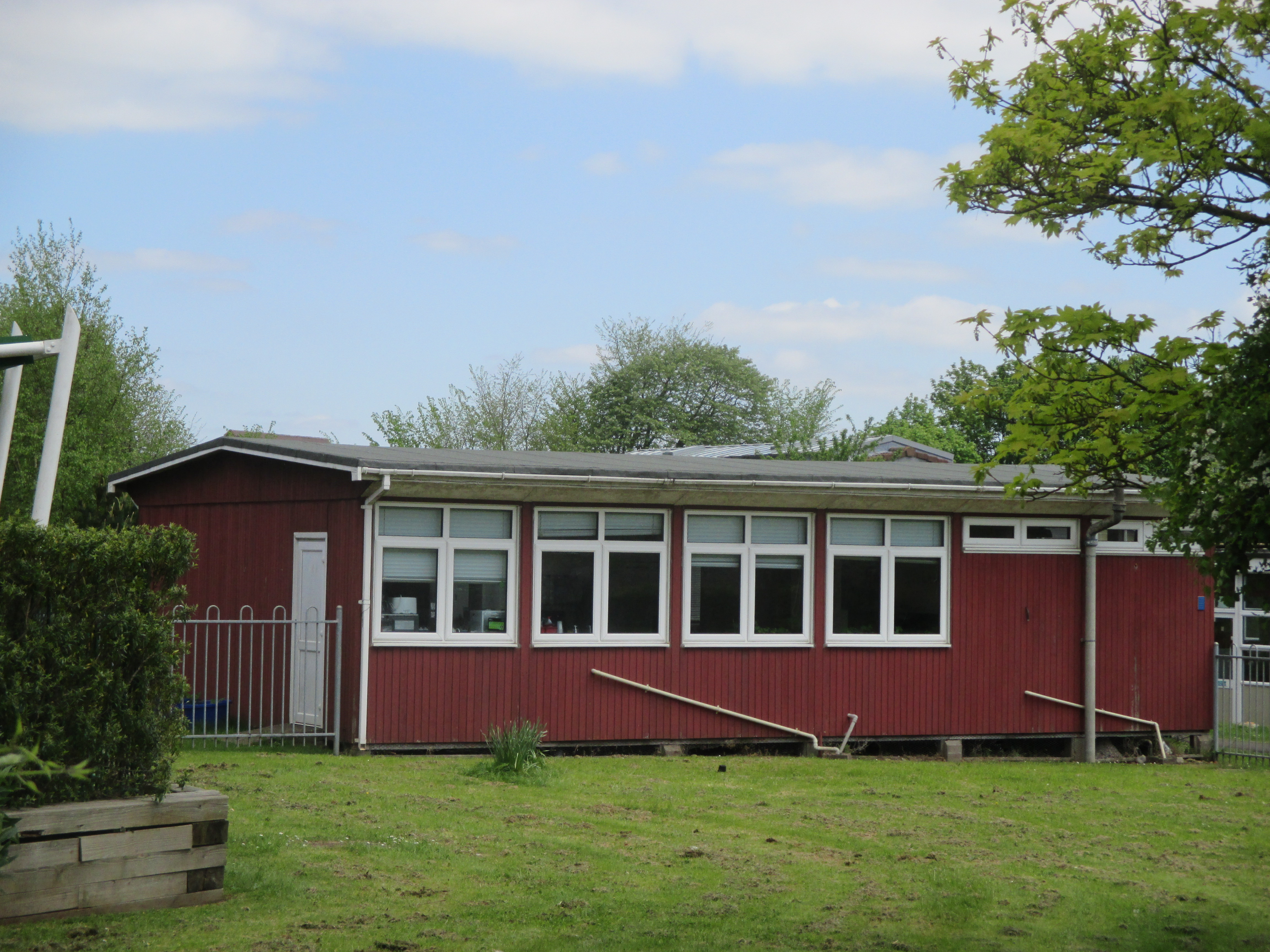
A Pratten classroom at Westfield Primary School

F. Pratten and Co Ltd, commonly known as Prattens, was a business located in Midsomer Norton that manufactured prefabricated buildings. Production included portable classrooms that were widely used after World War II.

== History ==
=== Early years ===
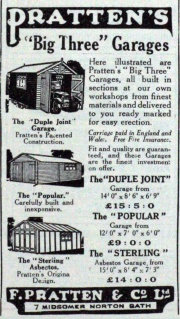
1928 advertisement for Prattens pre-assembled garages.

The business was founded in 1912 by 26 year old Frank Pratten, a coal miner's son from Westfield, He had previously worked for another local firm, W. Edgell, but acquired a small premises off Charlton Road, Midsomer Norton, and began making prefabricated buildings with Frank Bourne. They manufactured ammunition sheds during World War I.

Post war, Frank's brothers Ernest and Bertram joined the business. Economic difficulties during the inter-war years made low-cost prefabricated buildings attractive and business grew. In 1922 the firm offered garages from as little a £12 15s delivered. Prattens described itself as a "Horticultural Builders" and between 1924 and 1926 incorporated as F Pratten & Co Ltd.

During World War II, in common with many other workplaces, the company took on female factory workers to cover the shortfall left by men joining the armed forces.

=== Post-war boom ===
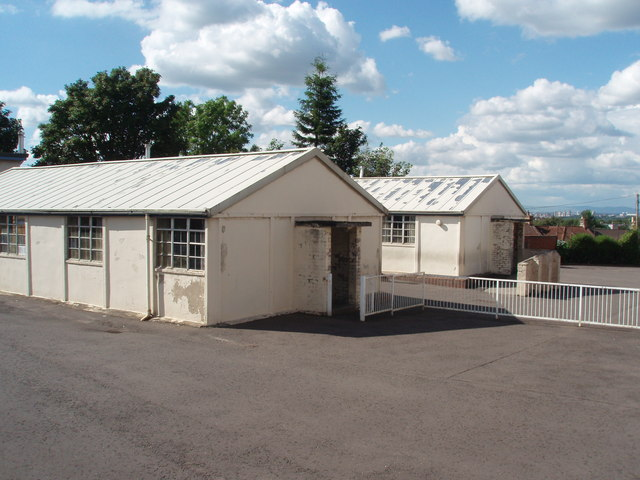
'HORSA huts' from c1947 at Machanhill Primary School

Raising of the school leaving age in the UK to 15 in 1945 prompted the HORSA hut programme. The subsequent increase to 16 in 1972 led to ROSLA classroom blocks. Both generated demand for prefabricated classrooms. Expected lifespan of the huts was only twenty-five years but many survived long after. Some examples from the 1950s – 1970s are still in use.

Prattens also manufactured sheds, greenhouses, office units and garages, which were exported throughout the world.

In 1968, the firm employed 250 staff and its factory was "completely mechanised in spite of being housed in old buildings".

=== Beazer ===
The company remained a family business until 1980 when it was sold to Beazer. The acquired firm's fortunes declined and the factory in Charlton Road was demolished in 1994 for housing development.

== Legacy ==
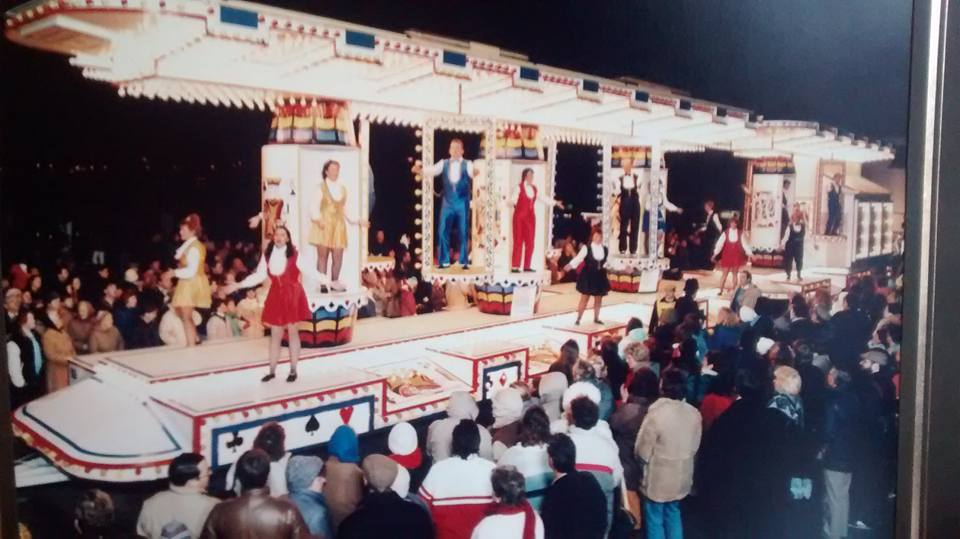
Prattens Carnival Club float 1988

Pratten Terrace is built at the former factory entrance and The Timbers opposite it, their names echoing the firm and its carpentry activities.

Two social clubs founded for Pratten's staff survive, both in Charlton Lane.

Prattens Sports and Social Club previously supported a Carnival Club that continued for some years after the firm closed.

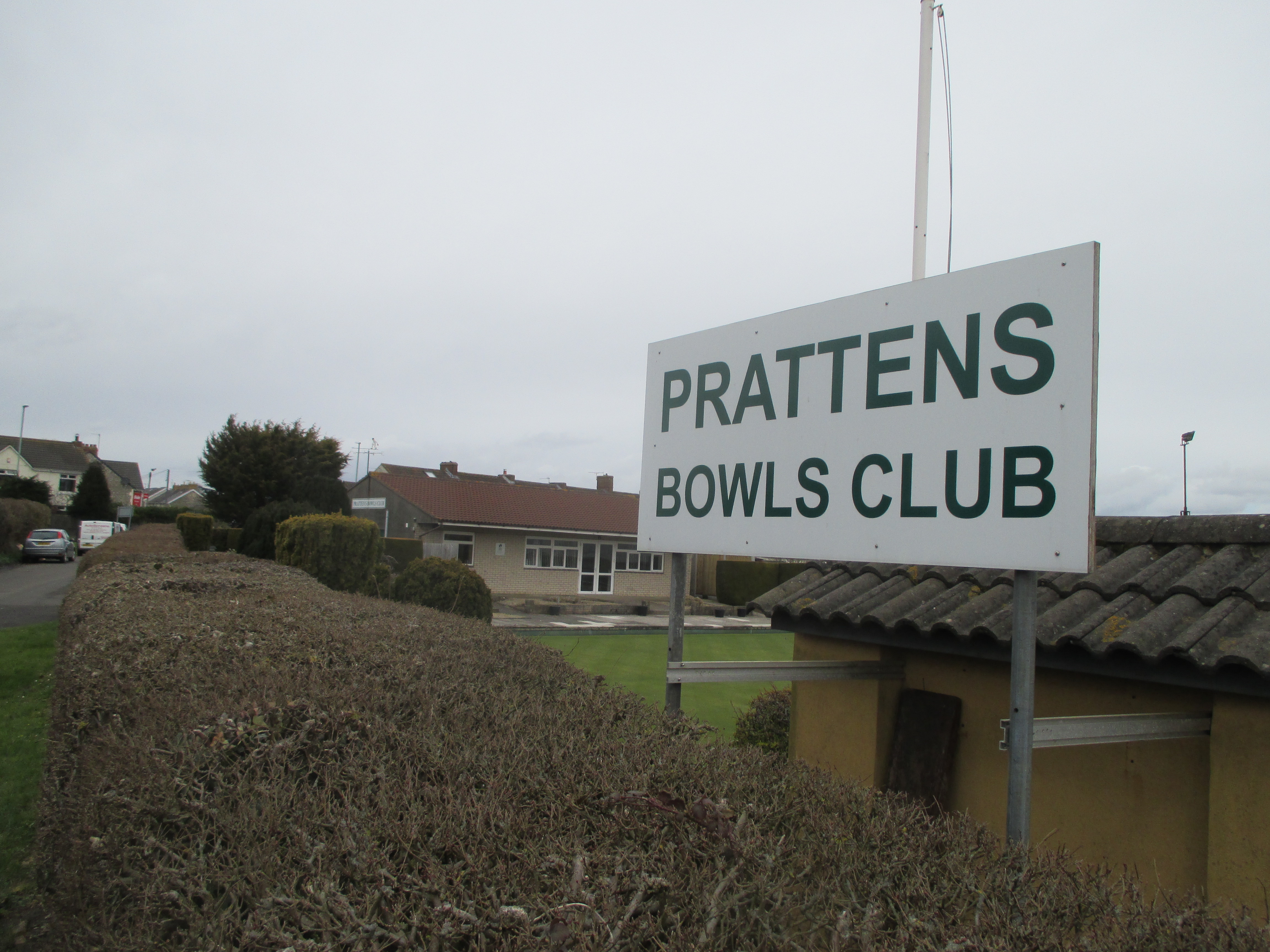
Prattens Bowls Club, Westfield, Somerset.

Prattens Bowls Club was started in 1928 by Mr Thomas, a cashier at Prattens, and built using voluntary labour. For many years it had a male-only membership, and the members had to be employed by Prattens. Membership of both clubs is now open to all. Prattens Bowls Club was the site of a fatal hot air balloon accident in 2011.

A Pratten hut is used as community centre and live entertainment venue at Warminster Athenaeum.

== See also ==
- Shepherd Building Group
