= George Rowdon =

English cricketer

Personal information
- Full name: George Henry Rowdon
- Born: 6 October 1914; Midsomer Norton, Somerset, England
- Died: February 1987; Bath, Somerset, England
- Batting: Right-handed
- Bowling: Right-arm off-breaks
- Role: Batsman (in FC cricket)

Domestic team information
- Years: Team
- 1936: Somerset
- Only First-class: 8 July 1936 Somerset v Essex

Career statistics
Competition	First-class
Matches	1
Runs scored	11
Batting average	5.50
100s/50s	–/–
Top score	9
Catches/stumpings	–/–
- Source: CricketArchive, 26 November 2013

George Henry Rowdon, born at Midsomer Norton, Somerset on 6 October 1914, and died in Bath in February 1987, played in one first-class cricket match for Somerset in the 1936 season.

An amateur right-handed middle-order batsman and a right-arm off-break bowler, Rowdon was picked for the Somerset match against Essex at Colchester. He made 9 and 2 as Somerset were beaten by an innings, the match finishing soon after lunch on the second day. He did not bowl in the match.

Rowdon was recorded at his birth and in the Wisden report of his single first-class appearance as "Rowden", but according to a website covering the Rowden family, "George Henry Rowdon" was born in Midsomer Norton in 1914, died in 1987, and this has subsequently been adopted as the more correct version of his name by CricketArchive.
