= Norton Hill School =

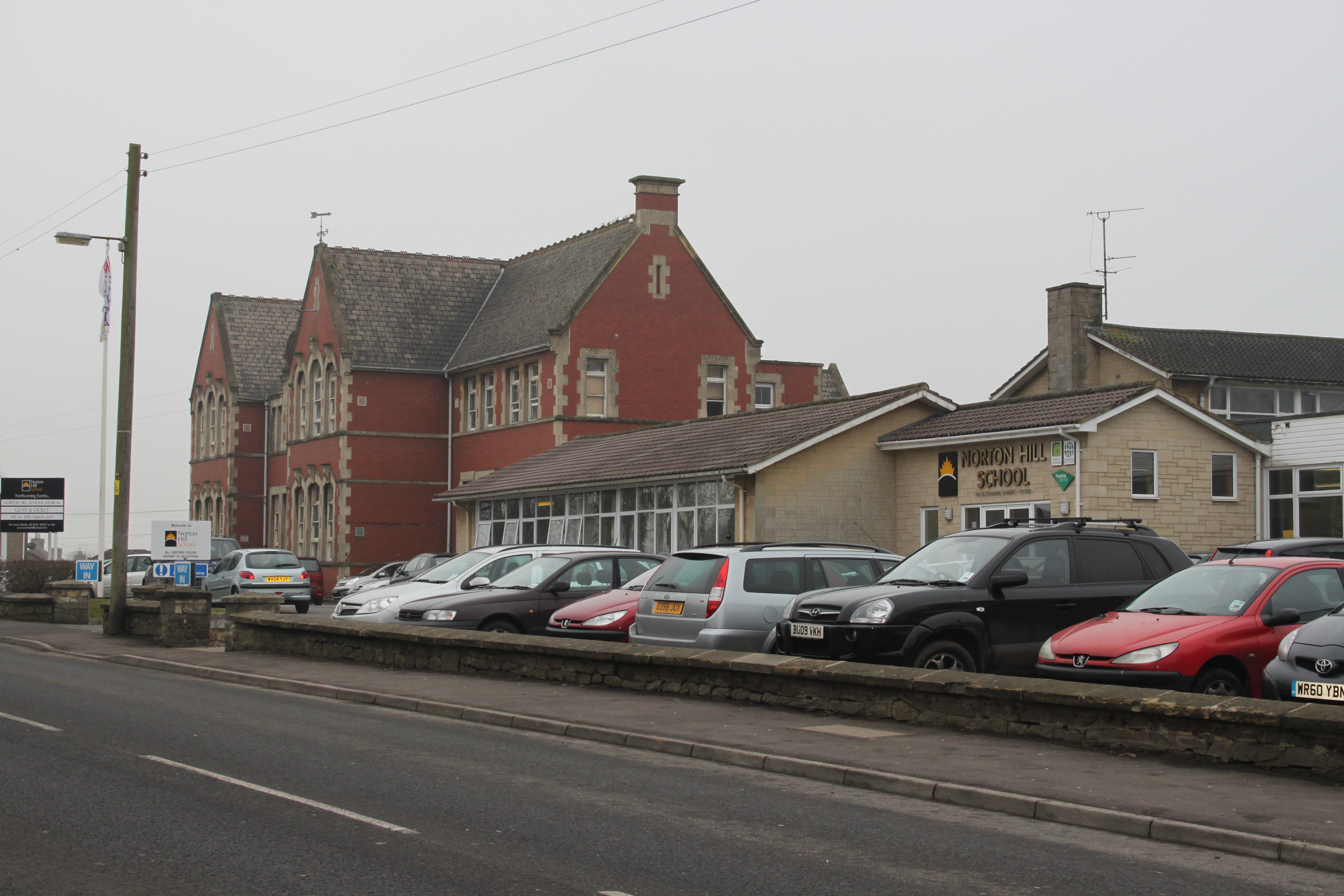

Location
- Charlton Road; Midsomer Norton, Somerset, BA3 4AD; England; 51.2842°N 2.4817°W

Information
- Type: Academy
- Motto: The best for all our students. The best from all our students
- Established: 1911; 115 years ago
- Specialists: Economics & Business, Maths & Computing, Languages, Sportsmark, Artsmark
- Department for Education URN: 136335 Tables
- Ofsted: Reports
- Head teacher: Gordon Green
- Gender: Co-educational
- Age: 11 to 18
- Enrolment: 1,827 (2024)
- Houses: Blackdown, Cotswold, Exmoor, Mendip and Quantock
- Colours: Purple, Yellow, Blue, Red & Green
- Website: www.nortonhillschool.com

Norton Hill School is a state school with academy status in Midsomer Norton, Somerset, England. It is part of the Midsomer Norton Schools Partnership academy group. It was formerly the Midsomer Norton Grammar School.

The school had 1,827 students from the age of 11 to 18 as of 2024 including 378 in the sixth form. It is situated in the Norton Hill area of west Midsomer Norton, north of Radstock. It is between Silver Street (B3355) and Fosseway (A367) near the former Midsomer Norton railway station, being nearer to Silver Street and just east of the railway centre.

== History ==
=== Grammar school ===
Some of the current school buildings date back to its original foundation as Midsomer Norton Grammar School in 1911. In the 1950s, Midsomer Norton Grammar School teacher David Penrose and pupils from the school explored the newly discovered Hillier's Cave in the Mendip Hills, naming it after Gordon Hillier, headmaster at the school from 1926 to 1958.

=== Comprehensive ===
Norton Hill became a comprehensive school in September 1971. Secondary Modern schools at Paulton and Timsbury were also closed and their catchment areas and historical documentation transferred to Norton Hill.

In 1999, it gained specialist school status as a Technology College. In 2007, the specialism was changed to Maths and Computing College. In 2006, Norton Hill was awarded a second specialism as a Language College.

The school has received both the Sportsmark Award by Sport England and Artsmark Silver Award.

== Academic performance ==
In 2023, Ofsted described the school as 'good'. Its GCSE results place it seventh overall and fourth in the state schools in Bath and North East Somerset. At A-Level it is 12th in the area for points per pupil score, just below the average.

== Notable alumni ==
=== Midsomer Norton Grammar School ===
- Sir Kenneth Warren (briefly), Conservative MP for Hastings from 1970 to 1983 and Hastings and Rye from 1983 to 1992.

=== Norton Hill School ===
- Duncan Steel, astronomer
- Tim Weaver, author
