= Westfield, Somerset =

Village in Somerset, England

Coordinates: 51.29°N 2.448°W

Westfield
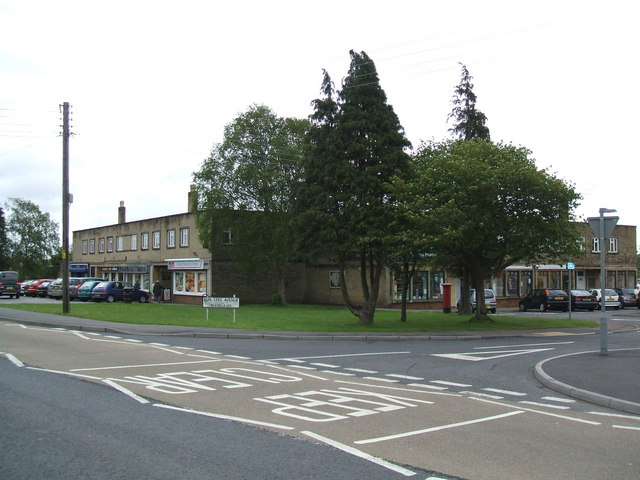
- Fosseway shops in Westfield

- Location within Somerset
- Population: 5,854 (2011)
- OS grid reference: ST6854
- Civil parish: Westfield
- Unitary authority: Bath and North East Somerset
- Ceremonial county: Somerset
- Region: South West
- Country: England
- Sovereign state: United Kingdom
- Post town: RADSTOCK
- Postcode district: BA3
- Dialling code: 01761
- Police: Avon and Somerset
- Fire: Avon
- Ambulance: South Western
- UK Parliament: Frome and East Somerset

Westfield is a village and civil parish in Bath and North East Somerset in the ceremonial county of Somerset, England. The village lies on the Fosse Way between the towns of Radstock and Midsomer Norton.

It is 11 miles (17.7 km) south-west of Bath, 12 miles (19 km) north-east of Wells, 12 miles (19 km) west of Trowbridge, 9 miles (14 km) north-west of Frome, and 17 miles (27 km) south-east of Bristol.

Its geographical location on the A367 south of Bath has resulted in it being an important base for services for the population centres of the old Somerset Coalfield area, for which it hosts the police and fire stations and the local further education college. For many years it hosted the annual winter carnival, until in 2014 the carnival route was changed.

== History ==
The Fosse Way Roman road originally ran through this area, between what is now Radstock and Midsomer Norton. Westfield is not mentioned in the Domesday Book. By the early nineteenth century Westfield still consisted mostly of rural land and coal mining works, with little residential development. It was with the building of large numbers of terraced miners' cottages along the Fosse Way in the nineteenth and early twentieth centuries that the area developed into a more populous area in its own right, with Westfield starting to appear on maps and being recognized as a settlement. Modern housing estates were developed on land on both sides of the Fosse Way in the 1970s.

For many years, Westfield hosted the Midsomer Norton carnival every November, the only unofficial carnival on the Somerset circuit. The route was moved to Westfield when traffic improvements to Midsomer Norton High Street made the original route prohibitive for the large vehicles. However, in 2014, a new route was established travelling through Midsomer Norton, Radstock and Westfield.

Westfield is the site of the 2011 Somerset hot air balloon crash in which two hot-air balloonists who had been attempting to make a high-altitude ascent were killed when their balloon crashed at the Prattens Bowls Club.

== Industry ==
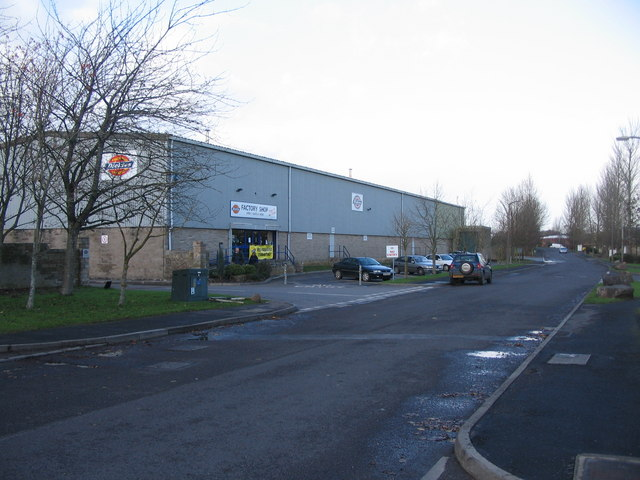
Westfield Trading Estate

As in the neighbouring towns and villages, coal mining was an important industry, with the largest mine at Norton Hill in Westfield. In total there were three mines in Westfield, two at Norton Hill and a third at Wells Way.

In 1839, the Wells Way pit was the scene of a disaster in which twelve miners died when the rope snapped when they were descending into the pit. A monument recording this event can be found in the cemetery of the Church of St John the Baptist, Midsomer Norton, with an inscription recording the popular belief that that rope was maliciously cut, although nobody was ever apprehended for the alleged act.

The seams of coal were thin, and because of the geology they were not easy to work. The Wells Way pit closed in 1920, and the Norton Hill pit in 1966. Despite modernisation in the early 1960s, the pit lapsed into unprofitability due to local geological difficulties and manpower shortages. The Norton Hill colliery at Westfield was owned by the Beauchamp family who owned many of the other collieries and related works on the Somerset Coalfield at various times. It was known as "Beauchamp's Goldmine", as it was the most productive mine in the whole coalfield.

Westfield is the location of a former Clark's Shoes factory, and the disused Westfield Quarry lies a short distance to the west of the main built-up area of the parish. It was also the location of the Prattens factory that manufactured temporary prefabricated classrooms.

The Westfield Trading Estate is home to many national and local businesses, including the Midsomer Norton, Radstock & District Journal.

== Governance ==
Westfield forms part of the Frome and East Somerset constituency, which elects a Member of Parliament to the House of Commons of the Parliament of the United Kingdom. Prior to Brexit in 2020, it was part of the South West England constituency of the European Parliament.

Westfield was formerly part of the parish of Norton Radstock, along with Radstock and Midsomer Norton until May 2011, when it became a parish in its own right. However, The name Westfield was used for a ward of the former Wansdyke District Council, abolished in 1996. In 1988 it was described as "a distinct district on the outer edge of Norton-Radstock".

Almost all significant local government functions are carried out by Bath and North East Somerset, a unitary authority, but Westfield also has its own parish council, with mostly consultative functions. The parish council is based in the Oval Office in St Peter's Business Park in Westfield.

There is one electoral ward in Westfield. The area and population are the same as quoted above for the parish.

== Geography ==
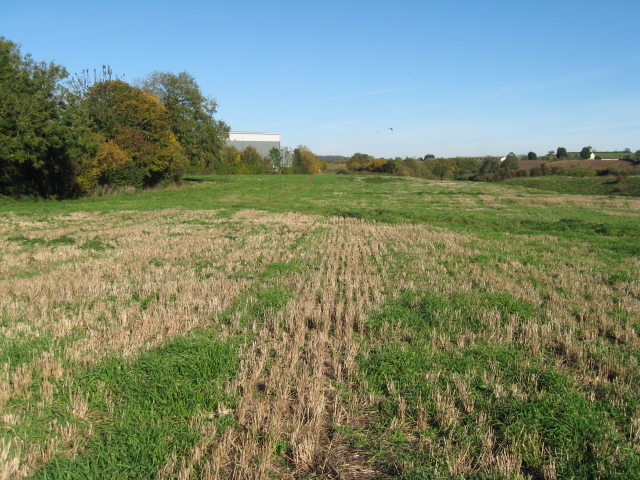
Waterside Valley, Westfield

The northern parish boundary with Midsomer Norton is formed by the disused Somerset and Dorset Joint Railway line that ran between Midsomer Norton South and Bath Green Park stations. This was converted in 2011 into the Five Arches Greenway cycle path that connects Radstock with Norton Hill School, in partnership with Sustrans.

Most of the parish consists of residential and industrial development, but at the southern end of the parish below Westfield Trading Estate lies Waterside Valley, where a stream runs through an area of farmland, scrub and an overgrown coal tip north-west of the village of Haydon.

== Education ==
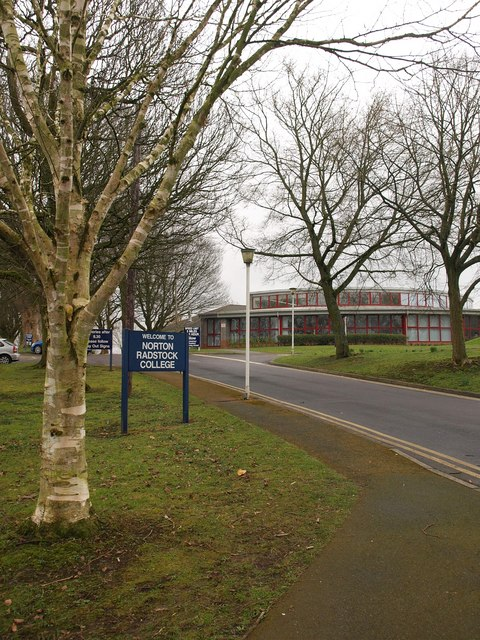
Bath College, Somer Valley site, Westfield

There is one first school in Westfield, Westfield Primary School and a school for pupils age 3–19 with complex learning difficulties, Fosseway School. Just outside the Westfield parish boundary lies St Benedict's primary school, actually part of Somerset.

There are no mainstream secondary schools within Westfield, but it is served by Norton Hill School and Somervale School in Midsomer Norton and by Writhlington School in Radstock.

Westfield has a further education college, the Somer Valley campus of Bath College, which also serves Midsomer Norton, Radstock, Keynsham and surrounding districts. By 2013 the college, then operating independently as Norton Radstock College, had 1,000 full-time students and 5,000 part-time students, having expanded steadily since it opened in the 1940s. A merger with Bath College, which has its main campus in Bath city centre, was completed in 2015.

== Religious sites ==
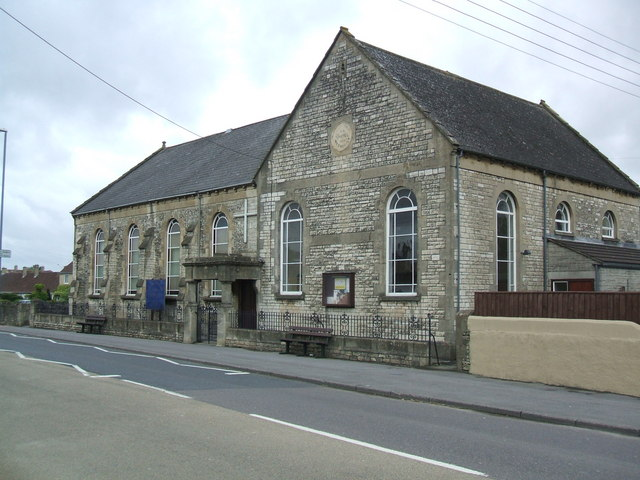
Westfield Chapel

The first Methodist hall in Westfield was built in 1869. It is now used as the Sunday school. The present church building opened in 1898.

St Hugh's Roman Catholic Church on Wells Hill was housed in the former Purnell's printing works but closed as a church in 2015. The church acquired the building after the First World War.

St Peter's Church of England parish church was built in 1988.

== Notable buildings ==
Westfield House, on the Wells Road, was built around 1830 and later in the nineteenth century was used as an isolation hospital for smallpox patients. It has been designated as a Grade II listed building.

A corrugated iron Edwardian reading room, later used as a snooker hall, was demolished in 2014 to make way for housing.

== Sport ==
Westfield F.C. were founded in 1976 and play in the Somerset County Football League.

== Notable people ==
- Frank Pratten (1886-1941), founder of Prattens, manufacturer of prefabricated buildings.
