= Uriah Maggs =

English antiquarian bookseller (c.1828–1913)

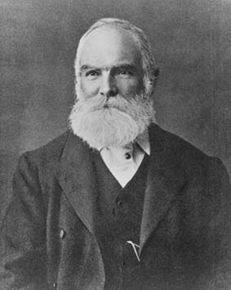
- Born: c. 1828; Midsomer Norton, Somerset, England
- Died: September 1913 (aged c. 84 -85)
- Children: 2 sons

Uriah Maggs (c. 1828 – September 1913) was the founder in 1853 of Maggs Bros Ltd, antiquarian booksellers in London.

== Early life ==
Uriah Maggs was born in Midsomer Norton, Somerset circa 1828. In about 1850, he and his father left to start a new life in London.

== Career ==
After several failed business ventures, Maggs took up bookselling, founding Maggs Bros Ltd. He traded first from his own home, but later opened his first bookshop in 1855 at 44 Westbourne Terrace North, Paddington. He also ran a circulating library and hired out newspapers. From Westbourne Terrace North the business was moved after several years to Church Street, Paddington Green, a site now occupied by the Children's Hospital.

At the end of 1894, Maggs retired, leaving the business in the hands of his two elder sons, Benjamin and Henry.

== Death and legacy ==
Maggs died in September 1913. His shop moved premises to 50 Berkeley Square in London in 1938, where it is still based and run by the Maggs family.
