= Midsomer Norton, Radstock & District Journal =

Free weekly newspaper in Somerset, United Kingdom

Radstock, Midsomer Norton and District Journal
- Type: Weekly newspaper
- Format: A4
- Owner: Tindle Newspaper Group
- Editor: Rebecca Brooks
- Founded: 1980
- Language: English
- Headquarters: Unit 22, Midsomer Enterprise Park BA3 2BB
- Circulation: 16,000 (August 2011)
- Price: Free
- Website: /

The Midsomer Norton, Radstock and District Journal is a free weekly newspaper circulated in Midsomer Norton, Radstock, Westfield, and surrounding villages in Somerset.

== Ownership ==
The newspaper is owned by Midsomer Norton & Radstock Journal Ltd, part of Tindle Newspaper Group, the Surrey-based publisher that owns many local UK titles.

== Format and publication ==
The newspaper consists of 28/32 pages published in colour in A4 format. The editorial offices are in Midsomer Norton. It is printed on an industrial estate in Shaftesbury and circulated door to door via local newsagents and to petrol filling station, pubs, supermarkets and other shops.

== History ==
It was first published on 26 June 1980. It was founded by Steve Shipley. George Donkin later became Steve's partner in the newspaper.

In August 2003, Northcliffe Newspapers (now Northcliffe Media, owned by the Daily Mail), attempted to acquire the title. However, the circulation figures for titles owned by Northcliffe meant that written consent of the Secretary of State for Trade and Industry was required.

However, in October 2003 it was reported that the then Parliamentary Under Secretary of State at the Department of Trade and Industry with responsibility for Competition, Gerry Sutcliffe had declined to consent to the transfer of ownership of Northcliffe because of the strength of Northcliffe's titles in the Bristol and Bath area.

As a result, within hours Tindle Newspaper Group led by Sir Ray Tindle acquired the Journal instead, with Donkin continuing to run the Journal part of the company after the takeover. Tindle Newspaper Group own the title to this day, George Donkin retired in 2013. The paper's Editor since then is Rebecca Brooks.

== Circulation and coverage ==
The current circulation for The Journal is 10,000 copies per week and is distributed throughout Midsomer Norton and Radstock, to the outskirts of Frome, Bath, Keynsham, the Chew Valley and all of the villages in between.
