= Frederick Pratten (cricketer) =

English cricketer

Personal information
- Full name: Frederick Lewis Pratten
- Born: 13 February 1904; Midsomer Norton, Somerset, England
- Died: 23 February 1967 (aged 63); Midsomer Norton, Somerset, England
- Batting: Right-handed

Domestic team information
- Years: Team
- 1930–1931: Somerset

Career statistics
Competition	FC
Matches	12
Runs scored	71
Batting average	7.88
100s/50s	0/0
Top score	16
Catches/stumpings	6/5
- Source: CricketArchive, 22 December 2015

Frederick Lewis Pratten, born on 13 February 1904 at Midsomer Norton, Somerset, England, where he also died on 23 February 1967, was a cricketer who played 12 first-class matches for Somerset in 1930 and 1931.

A wicketkeeper and tail-end batsman, Pratten was one of several substitute wicketkeepers used by Somerset to cover the absence through ill-health of the regular wicketkeeper, Wally Luckes. Others included the ultimate non-batsman, Seymour Clark, and the opening batsman Frank Lee.

Pratten played once in the 1930 season in the match against Leicestershire, not batting and taking one catch. In the 1931 season, he played in Somerset's first 10 County Championship matches, plus the match against the New Zealanders, taking in those 11 matches five catches and making five stumpings. At the end of June, Lee took over the wicketkeeping duties, and Pratten did not appear in first-class cricket again.

He reached double figures only three times in 18 innings, twice in the match against Nottinghamshire, which Somerset still lost heavily.
