= Norton Radstock =

Former civil parish in Somerset, England

Coordinates: 51.293°N 2.441°W

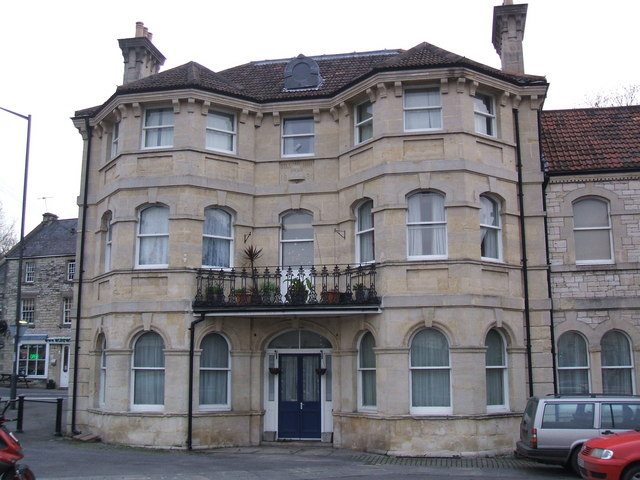
- Former Bell Hotel, Radstock

- Location within Somerset
- Population: 21,325 (2001 Census
- OS grid reference: ST692550
- Unitary authority: Bath and North East Somerset
- Ceremonial county: Somerset
- Region: South West
- Country: England
- Sovereign state: United Kingdom
- Post town: RADSTOCK
- Postcode district: BA3
- Dialling code: 01761
- Police: Avon and Somerset
- Fire: Avon
- Ambulance: South Western
- UK Parliament: North East Somerset

Norton Radstock was formerly a civil parish in Somerset, England. It covered the closely adjoining towns of Midsomer Norton and Radstock, along with the smaller settlements of Clandown, Haydon, Westfield, and Writhlington. It was created as a civil parish and urban district in 1933 from a merger of the two urban districts of Midsomer Norton and Radstock. It ceased to be an urban district in 1974, when district-level functions passed to Wansdyke District Council, which was in turn replaced by Bath and North East Somerset Council in 1996. The parish of Norton Radstock was abolished in 2011, when the area was split into three civil parishes called Midsomer Norton, Radstock and Westfield.

The conurbation is 8 miles (13 km) south-west of Bath, and the same distance north-west of Frome. It had a population of 21,325 at the 2001 census.

== History ==
Midsomer Norton and Radstock were both ancient parishes. As well as the town itself, Midsomer Norton parish included the hamlets of Welton and Clapton, and also had an exclave covering the western side of the village of Stratton on the Fosse. The settlements of Clandown and Westfield both straddled the boundaries between Midsomer Norton and Radstock parishes.

Midsomer Norton parish was made a local government district in 1868, and Radstock parish was likewise made a local government district in 1874. Such districts were reconstituted as urban districts under the Local Government Act 1894.

In the early 1930s, it was decided that the two closely adjoining towns should be administered together as a single urban district. The separate urban districts of Midsomer Norton and Radstock were therefore abolished and merged into a single urban district called Norton Radstock in 1933. Some adjustments were made to the boundaries with neighbouring parishes as part of the same reforms. The detached part of Midsomer Norton parish was added to Stratton on the Fosse, and the Clapton area was transferred to Ston Easton parish. The neighbouring parish of Writhlington was also abolished, with the northern part around the village included in the new Norton Radstock district, and the more rural southern part of that parish transferred to Kilmersdon. There were also more minor adjustments to the boundaries with the neighbouring parishes of Kilmersdon and Paulton. The new urban district was also made a single civil parish called Norton Radstock; as an urban parish it had no separate parish council, with the lowest tier of local government being Norton Radstock Urban District Council.

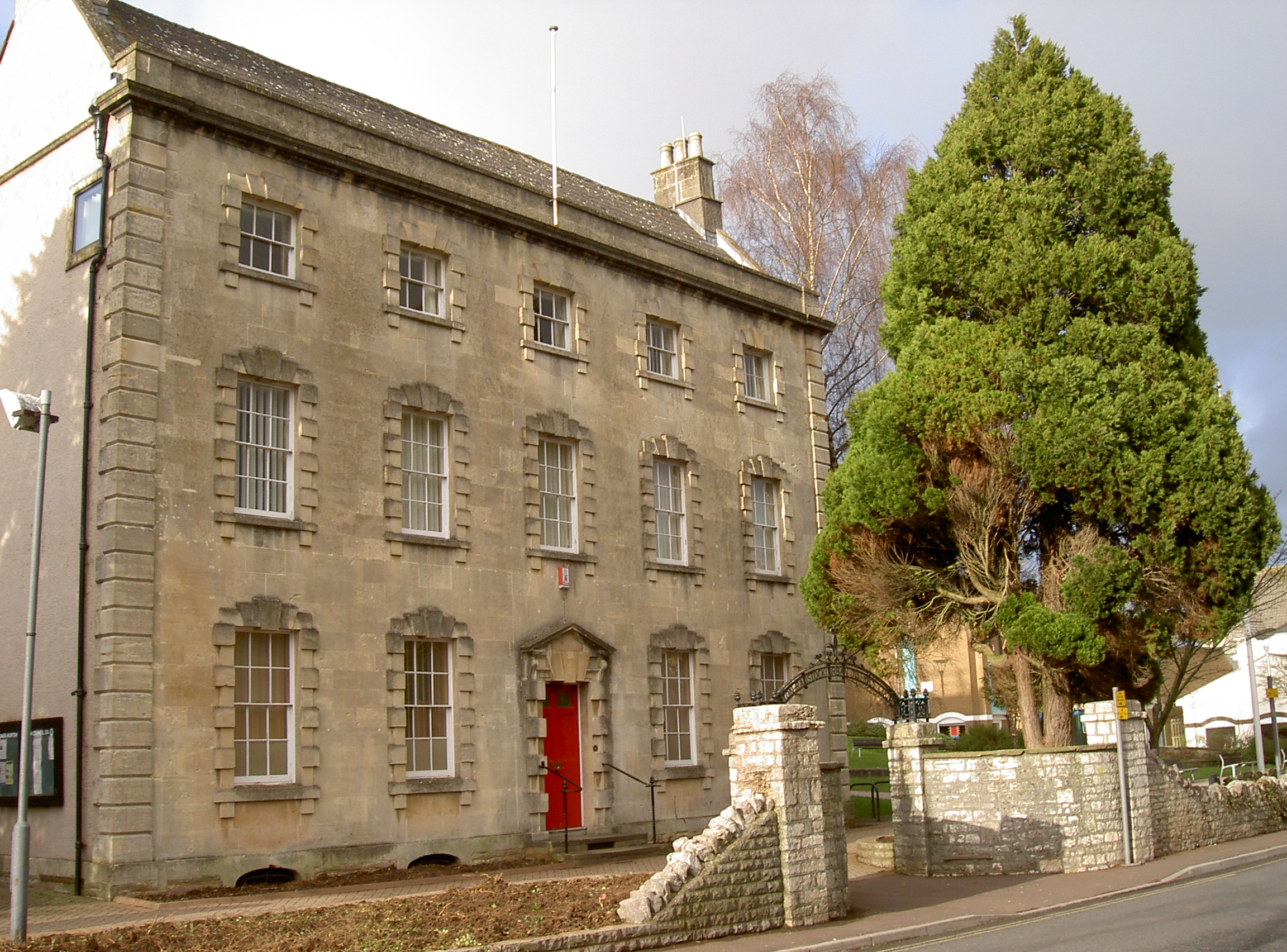
The Hollies, 19 High Street, Midsomer Norton: bought in 1937 to serve as urban district council's headquarters

In 1937, four years after its creation, the new urban district council bought a large 18th-century house called The Hollies at 19 High Street in Midsomer Norton, to serve as its headquarters.

Norton Radstock Urban District was abolished in 1974 under the Local Government Act 1972 and the area became part of the new Wansdyke district in the new county of Avon. A successor parish called Norton Radstock was created as part of the 1974 reforms, covering the former urban district.

Wandsyke and Avon were abolished in 1996, when the parish of Norton Radstock became part of Bath and North East Somerset. For ceremonial purposes, the area was restored to Somerset at the same time.

A 2009 petition from residents triggered a governance review of the area. The result was that the parish of Norton Radstock was abolished in 2011, and split into three new parishes called Midsomer Norton, Radstock, and Westfield.

== Twinning ==
Norton Radstock was twinned with Ambarès-et-Lagrave in France from September 1982.
