= Sportsmark =

Accrediation scheme for sports provision in schools

Sportsmark is Sport England's accreditation scheme for secondary schools. The scheme recognises a school's out of hours sports provision.

Sportsmark awards are given to secondary schools for provision for sport and physical education. They are currently being reviewed along with Activemark awards with plans for a new sports partnership mark. When the policies were introduced there was little other investment into school sport. In England, if a school or college is given sportsmark accreditation, it is then entered for specialist status.

== See also ==
- Sport in England
- Artsmark
- Charter Mark
