= Louise Whittock =

English actress (1896–1951)

Jesse Louise Whittock (3 February 1896 – 1951) was an English actress, singer and broadcaster who performed small and supporting roles with the D'Oyly Carte Opera Company in the mid-1920s, appeared in the chorus of an early film version of The Mikado and performed in the early years of the 2LO radio station in 1924.

== Life and career ==
Whittock was born in Midsomer Norton, Somerset, on 3 February 1896. She performed as a singer in the very early days of radio in 1924 on the 2LO radio station, just two years after it started broadcasting.

She made her first London stage appearance as Sally Besom in the ballad opera Kate; or, Love Will Find Out the Way at the Kingsway Theatre in 1924. She joined the D'Oyly Carte Opera Company in 1925, playing Kate in The Yeomen of the Guard and Fiametta in The Gondoliers. In 1926 she also played the roles of Plaintiff in Trial by Jury, Celia in Iolanthe, and Lady Psyche in Princess Ida. She left D'Oyly Carte in 1927.

She appeared in the chorus of an early film version of the Gilbert and Sullivan opera, The Mikado in 1926. In 1931, The Stage reported her appearance in The Gondoliers.

She died in 1951 in Esher, Surrey, England.
