= Artsmark =

Educational quality standard in England

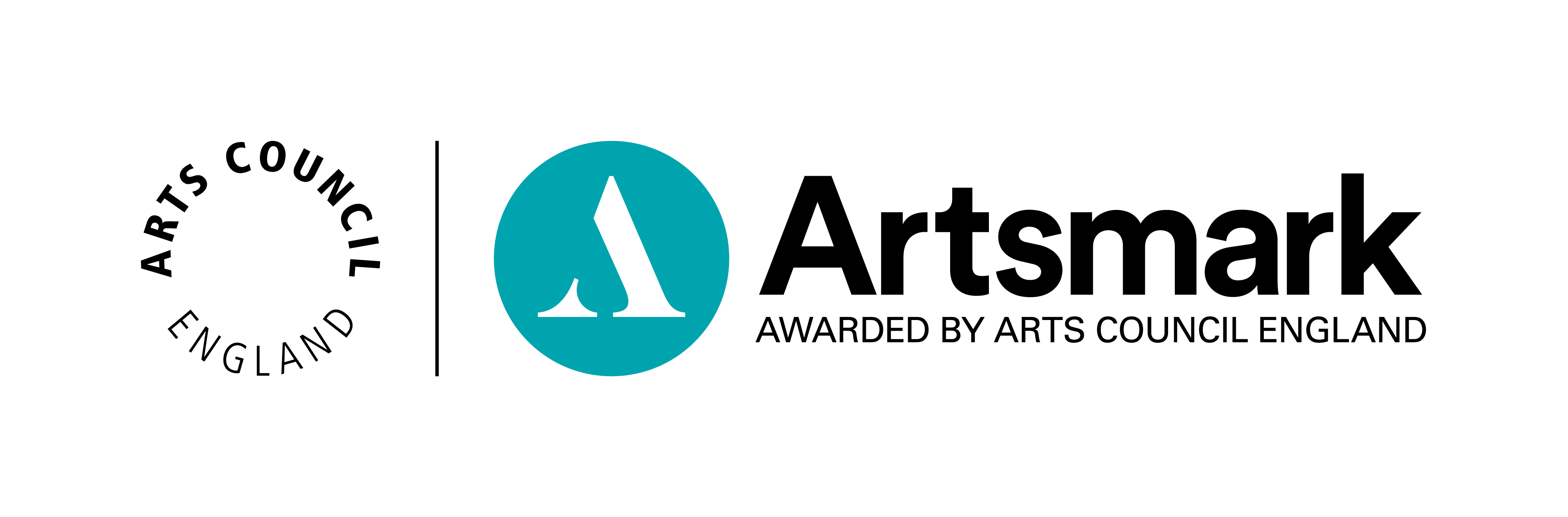
Artsmark Logo

Artsmark is the quality standard for culture and creativity in schools and education settings, awarded by Arts Council England. The Artsmark award provides a clear framework for teachers and education professionals to plan, develop and evaluate their arts and cultural provision. Its aim is to increase arts provision in education.

== Types of awards ==
Artsmark awards are given at three levels:

- Silver
- Gold
- Platinum
