= List of schools in Bath and North East Somerset =

This is a list of schools in Bath and North East Somerset, in the English county of Somerset.

== State-funded schools ==
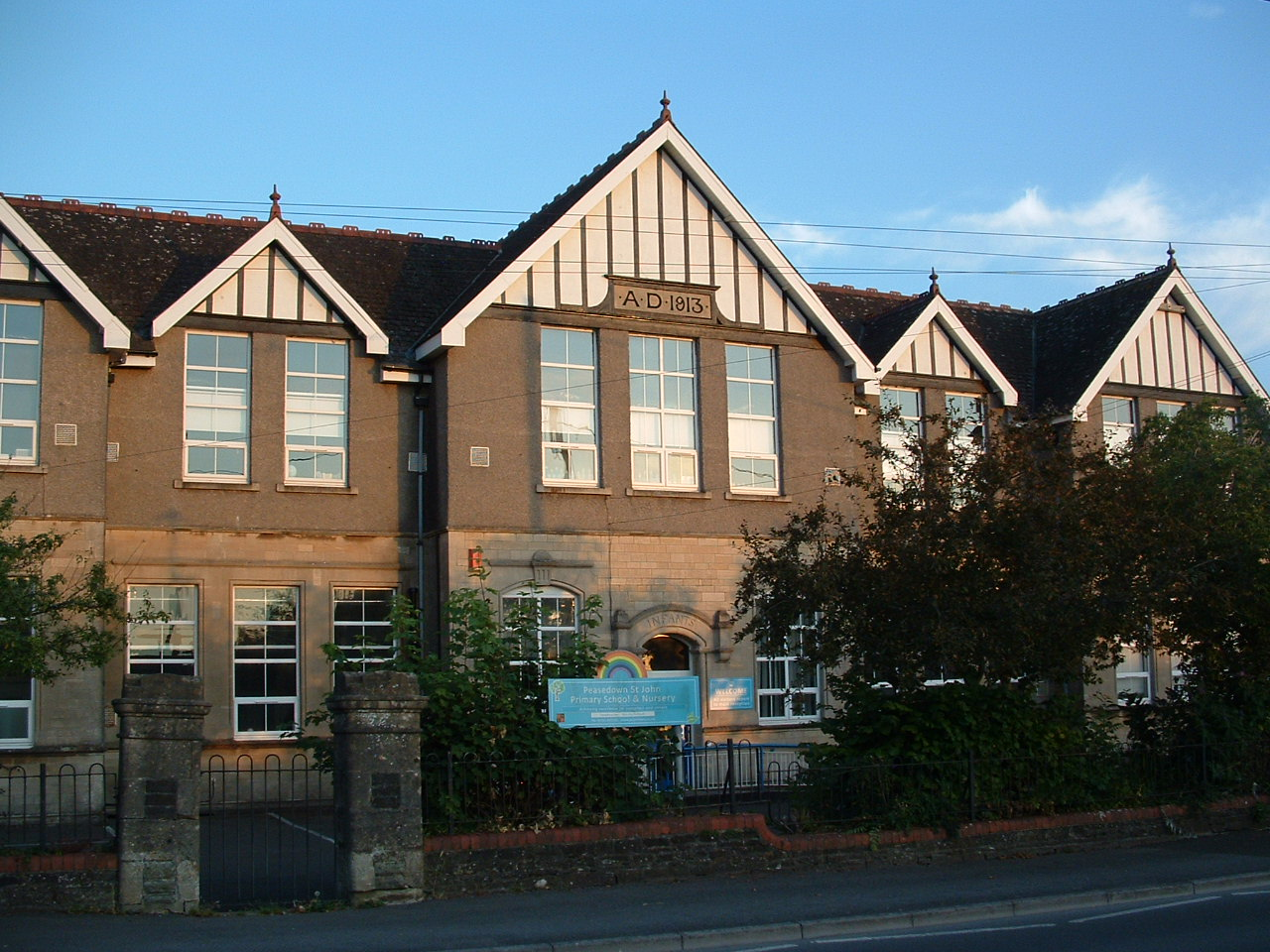
Peasedown St John Primary School

=== Primary schools ===
- Bathampton Primary School, Bathampton
- Batheaston Church School, Batheaston
- Bathford Church School, Bathford
- Bathwick St Mary's Church School, Bath
- Bishop Sutton Primary School, Bishop Sutton
- Cameley CE Primary School, Cameley
- Castle Primary School, Keynsham
- Chandag Primary School, Keynsham
- Chew Magna Primary School, Chew Magna
- Chew Stoke Church School, Chew Stoke
- Clutton Primary School, Clutton
- Combe Down CE Primary School, Combe Down
- East Harptree CE Primary School, East Harptree
- Farmborough Church Primary School, Farmborough
- Farrington Gurney CE Primary School, Farrington Gurney
- Freshford Church School, Freshford
- High Littleton CE Primary School, High Littleton
- Longvernal Primary School, Midsomer Norton
- Marksbury CE Primary School, Marksbury
- Midsomer Norton Primary School, Midsomer Norton
- Moorlands Infant School, Bath
- Moorlands Junior School, Bath
- Mulberry Park Educate Together Primary Academy, Combe Down
- Newbridge Primary School, Bath
- Norton Hill Primary School, Midsomer Norton
- Oldfield Park Infant School, Twerton
- Oldfield Park Junior School, Twerton
- Paulton Infant School, Paulton
- Paulton Junior School, Paulton
- Peasedown St John Primary School, Peasedown St John
- Pensford Primary School, Pensford
- Roundhill Primary School, Bath
- St Andrew's Church School, Bath
- St John's CE Primary School, Keynsham
- St John's CE Primary School, Midsomer Norton
- St John's RC Primary School, Bath
- St Julian's Church School, Wellow
- St Keyna Primary School, Keynsham
- St Martin's Garden Primary School, Bath
- St Mary's CE Primary School, Timsbury
- St Mary's CE Primary School, Writhlington
- St Mary's RC Primary School, Weston
- St Michael's Junior Church School, Twerton
- St Nicholas Church School, Radstock
- St Philip's CE Primary School, Odd Down
- St Saviour's Infant Church School, Larkhall
- St Saviour's Junior Church School, Larkhall
- St Stephen's Church School, Lansdown
- Saltford CE Primary School, Saltford
- Shoscombe Church School, Shoscombe
- Somerdale Educate Together Primary Academy, Keynsham
- Stanton Drew Primary School, Stanton Drew
- Swainswick Church School, Swainswick
- Trinity Church School, Radstock
- Twerton Infant School, Twerton
- Two Rivers CE Primary, Keynsham
- Ubley CE Primary School, Ubley
- Welton Primary School, Midsomer Norton
- Westfield Primary School, Westfield
- Weston All Saints CE Primary School, Weston
- Whitchurch Primary School, Whitchurch
- Widcombe CE Junior School, Bath
- Widcombe Infant School, Bath

=== Secondary schools ===
- Beechen Cliff School, Bath
- Broadlands Academy, Keynsham
- Chew Valley School, Chew Magna
- Hayesfield Girls' School, Bath
- IKB Academy, Keynsham
- Mendip Studio School, Radstock
- Norton Hill School, Midsomer Norton
- Oldfield School, Bath
- Ralph Allen School, Combe Down
- St Gregory's Catholic College, Odd Down
- St Mark's School, Bath
- Somervale School, Midsomer Norton
- Wellsway School, Keynsham
- Writhlington School, Writhlington

=== Special and alternative schools ===
- Aspire Academy, Odd Down
- Fosse Way School, Midsomer Norton
- Three Ways School, Odd Down

=== Further education ===
- Bath College

== Independent schools ==
=== Primary and preparatory schools ===
- The Paragon School, Lyncombe

=== Senior and all-through schools ===
- Bath Academy, Bath
- King Edward's School, Bath
- Kingswood School, Lansdown
- Monkton Combe School, Monkton Combe
- Prior Park College, Bath
- Royal High School, Bath

== See also ==
- List of schools in Somerset
- Education in Bath, Somerset

== Sources ==
- "List of infant, junior and primary schools in Bath and North East Somerset".
- "List of secondary schools in Bath and North East Somerset".
- "List of special schools in Bath and North East Somerset".
