= Education in Bath, Somerset =

Bath, Somerset has a large number of educational establishments for a city of its size. It has two universities, a further education college and five private schools as well as state-funded school provision. The state-funded schools are organised within the unitary authority of Bath and North East Somerset.

== Universities ==
The University of Bath was established in 1966 and has grown to become a leading university in the United Kingdom. The university is known, academically, for the physical sciences, mathematics, architecture, management, technology and social sciences, as well as for its leading Sports Training Village.

Bath Spa University was first granted degree-awarding powers in 1992 as a university college (Bath Spa University College), before being granted university status in August 2005. It has schools in the following subject areas: Art and Design, Education, English and Creative Studies, Historical and Cultural Studies, Music and the Performing Arts, and Social Sciences. Although regarded as a Bath university, the main campus is a few miles outside the city at Newton Park. Bath School of Art and Design is a college within the university based at Sion Hill, Bath. It also awards degrees through colleges such as Weston College in nearby Weston-super-Mare.

== Vocational training ==
Bath is the present home of Norland College, a provider of childcare training and education. Courses range from a BTEC programme for 14- to 16-year-olds offered in conjunction with local schools, through post-school practical vocational courses, to degree courses in association with the University of Gloucestershire.

== Secondary education ==
The city contains one further education college, Bath College, and several sixth forms as part of both state, private, and public schools. In England, on average in 2009, 49.8% of pupils gained 5 grades A*-C including English and Maths; for Bath and North East Somerset pupils taking GCSE at 16 it is 59.9%. Special needs education is provided by Three Ways School.

A review of secondary education in Bath was started in 2007, primarily to reduce surplus provision and reduce the number of single-sex secondary schools in Bath. Bath had an exceptional number of single-sex state secondary schools, with four single-sex schools compared to one non-religious and two religious co-educational schools. In a parental consultation 72% desired a re-organisation providing more co-educational places. Two schools became co-educational from 2012, still leaving two single-sex state-funded secondary schools.

By 2018, it was recognised that there was a serious shortfall in school place provision in Bath. For the whole of Bath and North East Somerset, 246 extra school places were estimated required by September 2018, and 722 by September 2021.

The Bath Education Trust is a partnership and collaboration involving most of the state-funded secondary schools in Bath, providing joint educational services and working with the local business community.

| School | Type | % pupils achieving 5+ A*-C GCSEs (including maths & English) | | | % pupils achieving EBacc (5+ A*-C academic GCSEs) |
| State-funded Secondary Schools | | 2009 | 2010 | 2013 | 2013 |
|---|---|---|---|---|---|
| Beechen Cliff School | boys-only with co-educational sixth form | 74 | 67 | 72 | 44 |
| Hayesfield Girls' School | girls-only with co-educational sixth form | 61 | 53 | 71 | 38 |
| Oldfield School | co-educational from 2012 with sixth form | 77 | 73 | 77 | 25 |
| Ralph Allen School | co-educational with sixth form | 61 | 72 | 73 | 34 |
| Saint Gregory's Catholic College | co-educational with sixth form | 66 | 64 | 64 | 41 |
| St Mark's CofE School | co-educational with no sixth form | 41 | 38 | 58 | 25 |
| Independent Schools | | 2009 | 2010 | 2013 | 2013 |
| Bath Academy | co-educational specialised tutorial college | n/a | | | |
| King Edward's School | co-educational with sixth form | 100 | 99 | n/a | n/a |
| Kingswood School | co-educational with sixth form | 98 | 95 | n/a | n/a |
| Prior Park College | co-educational with sixth form | 94 | 86 | n/a | n/a |
| Royal High School | girls-only with sixth form | n/a | | 97 | 71 |
| Monkton Combe School (just outside Bath) | co-educational with sixth form | n/a | | 93 | n/a |

== Primary education ==
Bath has about 27 Primary Schools, a few of which have nursery classes attached. In 2018 Bath and North East Somerset Council announced that it anticipated all its schools will be classified as academies by 2020, and it intended to cut central school support services and save at least £16 million by 2020.

== Closed educational establishments ==
The City of Bath reorganised secondary education by merging grammar schools and secondary modern schools to form comprehensive schools. West Twerton Secondary Modern School and City of Bath Girl's Grammar School were merged to form Hayesfield Girls' School. Saint Gregory's Comprehensive School was formed in 1979 through the amalgamation of Cardinal Newman School located at the site of the new school, and La Sainte Union Convent School founded in 1858. City of Bath Technical School was formerly part of Bath Technical College (now Bath College). It was formed in the early 20th century from several other institutions and evolved through various sites and roles until its closure in 1970, when it was merged with Westhill Boys School to form Culverhay School.

Bath Community Academy (formerly Culverhay School), operated by the multi-academy trust Cabot Learning Foundation, closed on 24 July 2018 due to low pupil numbers.

Older schools include:

- Bath College (English public school), 1878-1909
