= Bath College of Domestic Science =

Predecessor of Bath Spa University

Coordinates: 51.3938°N 2.3710°W

Bath College of Domestic Science was a small college in Bath, Somerset, England.

The teaching of domestic subjects in Bath started in 1892 at 19 Green Park with the founding of the Bath Technical Schools. The Technical Instruction Act 1889 had given local authorities power to levy a rate to provide such education. In this building instruction also started in subjects including cabinet making, carpentry, joinery, masonry, mathematics and French. The prospectus for domestic subjects offered "Household and High-Class Cookery, Laundry Work, Dressmaking, Stitchery and Ornamental Needlework".

In 1960 a local newspaper published a history of the college which stated:

"The College owes its existence to a decision taken by Miss M H Lawrie in 1893. She was then conducting classes in cookery and sewing for a small number of ladies at 19 Green Park. They attended the classes merely to be more efficient in the supervision of their domestic staff, but in 1893 they were joined by a woman who had another purpose in mind - to qualify as a teacher of domestic subjects. And so in this accidental way the college changed its course and, raising its standards, started to cater for people who wished to become teachers."

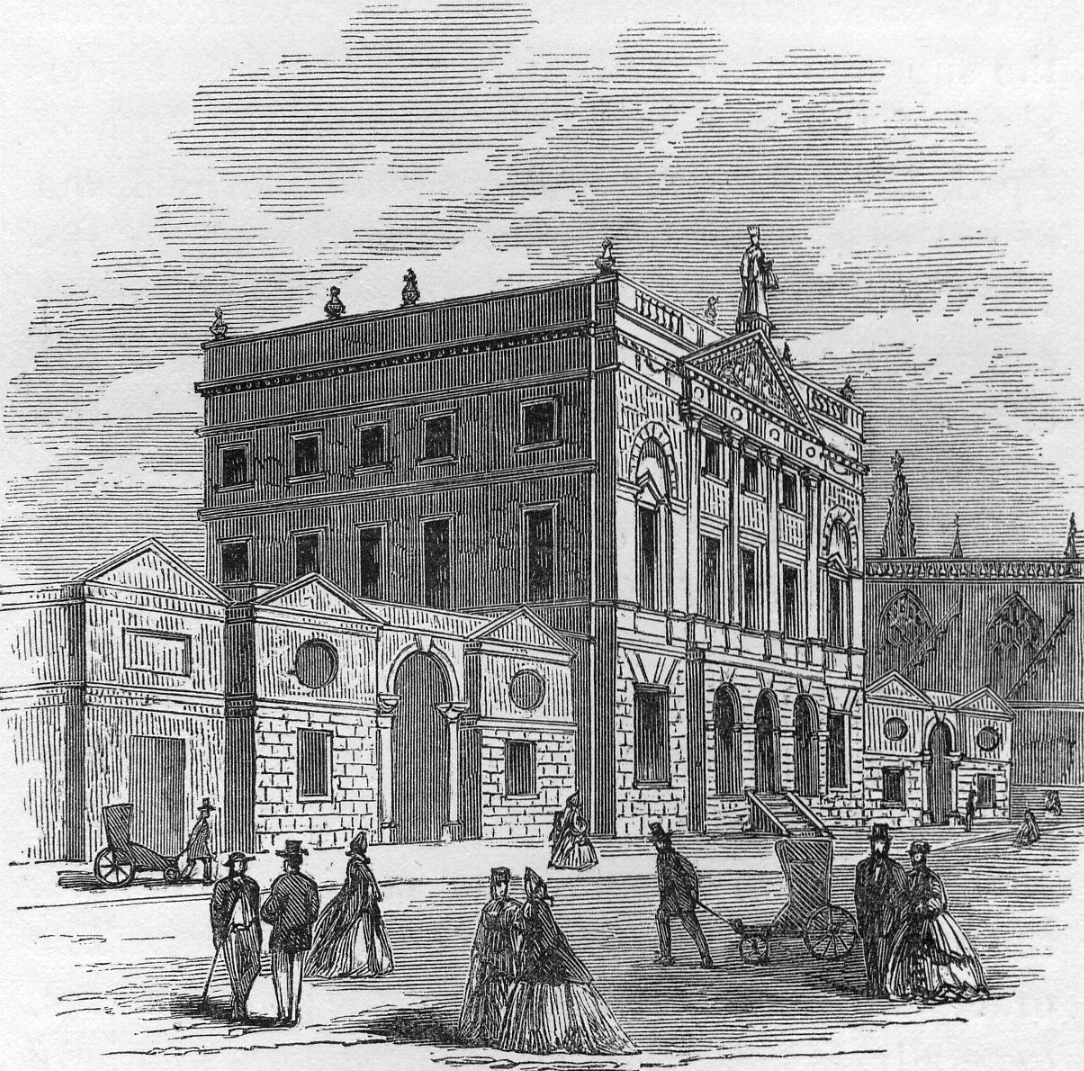
Bath Guildhall 1864, before the new Technical schools extension was built.

A photograph of the first group of students and another of Miss Lawrie were published in a commemorative brochure by Bath Spa University. In April 1896 the temporary homes of the various Technical Schools were united in the new north extension of the Guildhall. Miss Lawrie was succeeded as Headmistress by Miss A M Heygate in 1907, and in 1915 by Miss W M King who remained until 1945. In 1910 the main part of the domestic science teaching was moved to numbers 2 and 3, Long Acre, Bath. By the end of the First World War there were forty resident students. In 1920 the name Training College for Teachers of Domestic Subjects was adopted. In its early days the students had a uniform of a bright red blouse, black full-length skirt and white apron, and they were nicknamed "the scarlet runners".

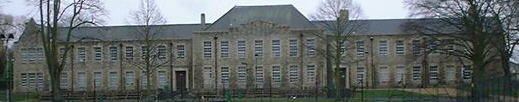
Brougham Hayes domestic science college building used from 1934 - 1960.

In 1934 the Domestic Science College moved to a building in Brougham Hayes which had been built as the Somerset Industrial School for Boys in 1832. In the emergency of wartime in 1939 this building was taken over by the Admiralty and the college moved to The Elms, a large house in the Weston area of the city, returning to Brougham Hayes in 1944.

In 1942 German bombing destroyed the original premises at Green Park but also flattened a large private house called St Winifred's at Sion Hill which was to become its future home. A hostel for students opened in the 1950s in Somerset Place. The first overseas student arrived from Nigeria in 1946 and in the following years many Commonwealth countries were represented in the student body. A course in Institutional Management began in 1946. Post-war student residences included Claverton Manor until 1956, after which work began on converting the building into the American Museum in Britain.

Planning for a new building at Sion Hill began after the war and the new Domestic Science College

"built at a cost of £200,000 came into use in September 1959. It stands on the Northern slopes of Bath at St Winifreds, Lansdown, and was designed by Councillor Hugh D Roberts. The teaching staff of 25 is headed by Miss E B Nielsen who has held that post since the end of the war."

The formal opening of the new premises by Queen Elizabeth the Queen Mother took place on 23 March 1960 and a history appeared in a supplement in Bath Chronicle to mark both this and the renovation of Bath Abbey. The feature notes that some of the stones from the ruined premises of St Winifred's were incorporated in the new structure. A change of name to Bath College of Education (Home Economics) took place in 1964/65. The final principal of the independent college was Miss Eileen Phillips. Validation of courses was by the University of Bristol. In 1975 the college was merged with Newton Park College to create Bath College of Higher Education, later Bath Spa University College and Bath Spa University. Bachelor's degrees in Home Economics and in Secondary teaching were subsequently awarded by the University of Bath and later by the Council for National Academic Awards. In 1985/86 the food-based courses were moved to new premises at Newton Park, allowing the Sion Hill building to be used for the courses of the Bath School of Art and Design returning from Corsham Court. Further degree course developments included BSc Honours courses in Human Ecology, Food Management, Human Nutrition and in Food, Nutrition and Consumer Protection, with the university finally receiving the authority to award its own degrees.

== See also ==
- Bath School of Art and Design
- Beechen Cliff School
- City of Bath College
- City of Bath Technical School
- Education in Bath, Somerset
- Hayesfield Girls' School
