= Paul Bird (artist) =

English artist and teacher (1923-1993)

- Born: 13 February 1923; London, England
- Died: 5 May 1993 (aged 70); London, England
- Education: Bath School of Art; Institute of Education
- Known for: Painting, drawing

Paul Bird (13 February 1923 – 5 May 1993) was an English artist and teacher who had a long and varied career.

== Biography ==
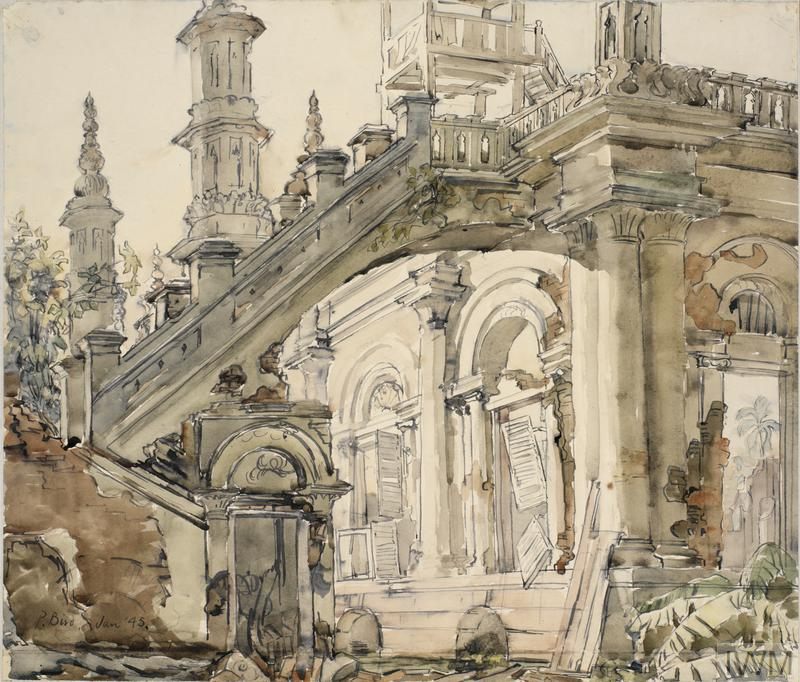
A Temple Showing Remains of a Japanese Lookout Post on the Roof (1945) (Art.IWM ART LD 5096)

Bird was born in London and studied at the Bath School of Art under Clifford Ellis. In Bath, Bird met the elderly Walter Sickert who became a major influence on him. During World War Two, Bird served in the Royal Navy and was deployed to the Far East and India. While on active service, Bird continued to paint and submitted a number of works to the War Artists' Advisory Committee, WAAC. WAAC eventually purchased a small number of these pictures and they are now held in the Imperial War Museum and the British Government Art Collection.

After the war, Bird studied at the Institute of Education in London, where his lecturers included Nikolaus Pevsner, before returning to Bath to teach art at the Bath Art Secondary School. In the early 1950s, Bird taught for a time as Head of Painting at the Bretton Hall Training College. In 1953 he joined the Community of the Resurrection at Mirfield in Yorkshire. Bird lived as a lay member of the Anglo-Catholic community there for eight years. When he left Mirfield, Bird joined the teaching staff at the Royal College of Art under Robin Darwin. There he taught drawing in the Film and Television School on a part-time basis before taking a full-time role as the vice-principal of the Central School of Art and Design. Bird worked at the Central from 1961 until 1983. From 1983 until the last year of his life, Bird presented an influential series of summer school lectures on The Art of Seeing.
