= Bath Community Academy =

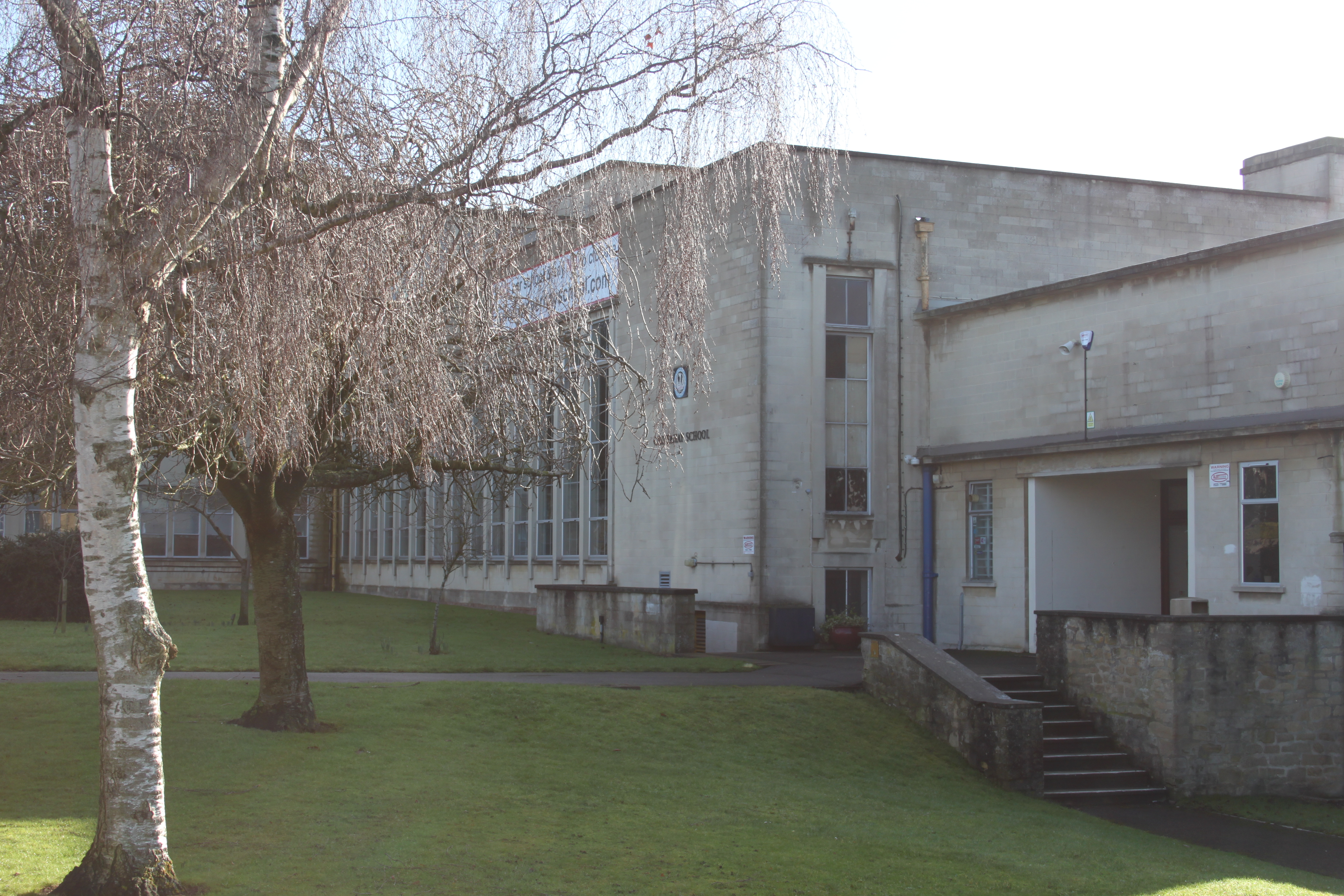

Location
- Rush Hill; Bath, Bath and North East Somerset, BA2 2QL; England; 51.3640°N 2.3921°W

Information
- Former name: Culverhay School
- Type: Secondary academy
- Established: 1956 (as Westhill Boys' School)
- Closed: 2018
- Local authority: Bath and North East Somerset Council
- Trust: Cabot Learning Federation
- Department for Education URN: 138394 Tables
- Ofsted: Reports
- Interim Principal: Chris Hall
- Gender: Mixed
- Age: 11 to 19
- Enrollment: 241
- Capacity: 720

Bath Community Academy (2012–2018), formerly Culverhay School (1956–2012), was a secondary school in the Odd Down area of Bath, England. Built as a boys' school, it became mixed-sex in 2012.

== History ==
In 1956, the original buildings were completed when West Twerton School at The Hollow moved to Rush Hill as a secondary modern school, and changed its name to Westhill Boys' School, administered by Bath Education Authority.

In 1966, sufficient funding was raised by the efforts of staff, pupils and the local community to enable an open-air swimming pool to be built within the school grounds. After 1969, the pool was covered. The pool measures 22 m × 7.5 m (72 ft × 25 ft) and is from 1 to 3 m (3.3 to 9.8 ft) deep. It has been equipped with facilities for disabled users, and is open to the public in the evenings and at weekends.

In 1971, Culverhay School was formed when the City of Bath reorganised secondary education by merging grammar schools and secondary modern schools to form comprehensive schools. Westhill Boys' Secondary Modern School and City of Bath Technical School were merged. The first headmaster was Colin Bayne-Jardine, a noted author of both history and educational management books. The school was one of the largest comprehensive schools in south west England at this time, with a nine form entry of around 250 boys and a total roll in excess of 1,200.

The school won the Schools National Angling Championship in 1977. Having previously achieved fourth place in 1976 the school was fourth in 1978 and second in 1979 from an initial national entry of over 160 and a final of 40 teams. Angling Times named the school's Angling Club its school club of the year in 1977. The club was unusual in being organised by pupils and not staff, but it had the support of the local club, Bath AA, and fishing tackle shop, Fishcraft.

In 2004, Culverhay was awarded specialist status in mathematics and computing.

In 2006, the school received one of four prizes in the national Sport Relief programme's competition for schools, for a plan devised by the pupils to raise money for the programme by travelling 1,355 miles (2,181 km) by running, swimming, cycling and kayaking. The swimmer Sharron Davies visited the school to award the prize.

Culverhay received the International School Award in recognition of its links with schools abroad, providing opportunities for students to visit other countries and to learn about their cultures. It achieved the Healthy Schools Award for its work in pupil health education. Extra curricular activities encouraged children to extend their academic interests into the local community. It was awarded the Gold Sportsmark in 2008 for its commitment to sport training.

In 2006, Ofsted judged the school to be satisfactory on a four-point scale of outstanding, good, satisfactory and poor. Some aspects of the school were rated as good, but the sixth form was given an overall rating of poor.

In 2009, Ofsted inspected the school again and upgraded its rating to good. The sixth form also received the same good rating. The report, which praised the school's improvement since the previous inspection, did note that Culverhay has a higher than average number of pupils with learning difficulties and disabilities, and that the number of pupils with a statement of special educational needs was almost double that of other schools.

In 2009, Culverhay was the worst performing school in Bath and North East Somerset, with 38% of pupils achieving five or more GCSE passes at grade C or higher including mathematics and English. In 2010, the pass rate dropped to 31%, again the lowest in the area.

In 2010, the school was identified for closure by Bath and North East Somerset council because of the large reduction in pupil numbers, from 476 at the time of the Ofsted inspection in May 2006 to 401 in May 2009. In January 2011, there were 348 pupils.

A consultation on the school's closure took place in September and October 2010. Despite 74% of respondents saying they were against, the council backed the closure, so no new pupils were to be admitted from September 2012. However, in September 2011, the decision to close the school was revoked after an independent assessment deemed that the school was sustainable as a co-educational establishment. £700,000 in funding was to be provided by the council for the necessary alterations. The school would remain financially viable as it was proposed to make a reduction in pupil intake levels as well.

In October 2011, government approval was received for Culverhay to become a sponsored academy run by Cabot Learning Federation.

=== Bath Community Academy ===
Bath Community Academy opened in the same buildings in 2012 as an 11–19 co-educational secondary school, part of the Cabot Learning Federation based in Bristol. Subjects taught at the academy included art, child development, computing, dance, design technology, drama, English and literacy, geography, history, iMedia, mathematics, modern foreign languages, music, physical education, religious education and science. The academy had its own radio station called Phoenix Radio which won two Sony Schools Radio Academy awards, in 2009 and 2012.

In 2014, there were 274 students, including boys in years 7 to 11 and a co-educational sixth form.

On 18 July 2016 the Cabot Learning Foundation announced that the school would close, stating that the school was not "sustainable or viable" due to low pupil numbers. The school closed on 24 July 2018.

== Later use of the buildings ==
Part of the former school was used by Bath Spa University, primarily for teacher training.

== Notable alumni ==
- Roland Orzabal, musician (Tears for Fears) – left year 13 in 1979

== See also ==
- Education in Bath, Somerset
- List of schools in Bath and North East Somerset
