= Clifford Ellis =

British artist, art teacher (1907-1985)

Clifford Wilson Ellis
- Born: 1907; Bognor Regis, Sussex, England
- Died: 1985 (aged 77–78)
- Known for: Painting and art education
- Spouse: Rosemary Ellis (m.1931)

Clifford Wilson Ellis (1907–1985) was a British printmaker, painter, designer and art teacher. Ellis is notable both for the work he did for the Recording Britain project during the Second World War and for his role in the development of art teaching. He frequently worked with his wife, artist Rosemary Ellis, and they signed their joint work C&RE.

== Biography ==
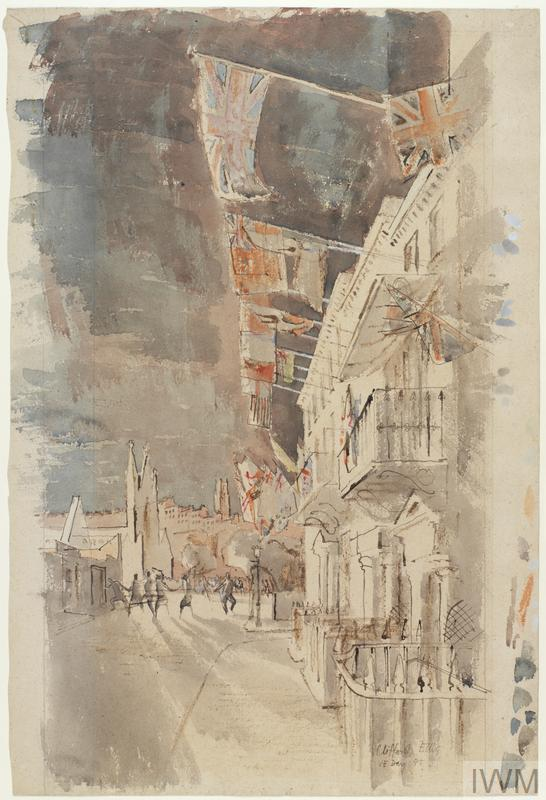
VE-Day, Bath, 8th May 1945 (1945) (Art.IWM ART LD 5201)

Ellis was born in Bognor Regis, Sussex. He came from an artistic family: his grandfather had been an artist and his uncle, Ralph Ellis, was a designer who had studied at the Slade School of Art. After a year at Saint Martin's School of Art, Clifford Ellis studied illustration at the Regent Street Polytechnic in London between 1924 and 1927. He then spent a year taking a post-graduate teacher training course before gaining a diploma in the history of art from the University of London.

In 1928, Ellis returned to Regent Street Polytechnic as a teacher and continued to teach there until 1936. During this period, he married Rosemary Collinson (1910–1998), and the couple began working together on a number of artistic projects and commissions. Their work included posters for London Transport and the General Post Office, and several designs for book covers and dust jackets, most notably for the long-running New Naturalist series published by Collins. For Shell-Mex & BP, starting in 1934 with Antiquaries Prefer Shell, they designed the 'Professions' series of posters including, for example, Anglers Prefer Shell. They also produced poster designs for the Empire Marketing Board and also lithographs for J. Lyons & Co. Together, they also designed mosaics for walls and floors, including the floor of the entrance hall of the British Pavilion at the Paris International Exhibition of 1937.

In 1936, Ellis took a teaching post at Bath Technical College and in 1937 he was appointed Head of the Bath Academy of Art. During World War II, Ellis oversaw the move of the Academy to new premises twice, first when its original premises were required for military use and on a second occasion when the new premises were destroyed in April 1942. Also during the war, Ellis was commissioned to record scenes in Bath for the Recording Britain project. In particular, in 1942, he was commissioned to depict examples of the decorative architectural ironwork seen on the city's buildings as the Ministry of Works were removing the iron to help the war effort. As well as painting examples of the decoration, Ellis intervened with the Ministry to save several important, early nineteenth century examples from being scrapped. Ellis also recorded the effects of the Bath Blitz bombing raids on the city; the War Artists' Advisory Committee purchased examples of these pieces and also his depiction of the VE-Day celebrations in the city.

After the war, Ellis and Rosemary continued with their artistic collaborations. In 1946 they designed the entrance area to the Britain Can Make It exhibition at the Victoria & Albert Museum and between 1945 and 1982 they designed 86 covers and dust jackets for the New Naturalist series of books and monographs. The couple signed these jackets, and other works, C&RE to reflect their joint and equal involvement. Ellis continued, until 1972, as head of the Bath Academy of Art. In this role, by developing a pioneering art syllabus and recruiting highly skilled artists as teachers, Ellis had a lasting influence on the development of many artists. Works by Ellis were included in the 1983 Landscape in Britain exhibition at the Hayward Gallery, the 1988 Art Deco Underground exhibition at the London Transport Museum and a retrospective of his work was held in 1989 at the Michael Parkin Gallery in London.
