= Rosemary Ellis =

British artist

- Born: Rosemary Collinson; 1910; London, England
- Died: 1998 (aged 87–88)
- Education: Regent Street Polytechnic
- Known for: Painting, graphic design
- Spouse(s): Clifford Ellis, m.1931–1985, his death

Rosemary Ellis née Collinson (1910–1998) was a British artist, graphic designer and teacher known for her poster and book jacket designs.

== Early life and education ==
Ellis was born in Totteridge, North London in 1910. Her father was a cabinet maker who started Frank Collinson & Co. while her grandfather was a designer of note for the Collinson & Lock furniture company. She spent part of her childhood at Netley Marsh in the New Forest with her mother's family, after her father died of Spanish Flu having fought in the First World War. From 1927 to 1931 she attended the art school of Regent Street Polytechnic in central London. At art school she met her husband, Clifford Ellis, the couple married in 1931 and would frequently collaborate on art projects together.

== Career ==
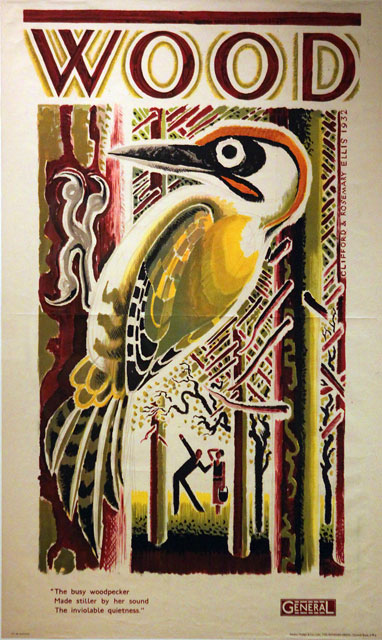
Woodpecker poster by C&RE

During the 1930s the Ellises produced more than twenty posters for London Transport, often using surrealist motifs, such as in the 1937 poster Travels in time on your doorstep. They also designed posters for the General Post Office, BP, the Empire Marketing Board plus a series of 16 lithographs for J Lyons & Co restaurants.

Starting in 1934 the couple designed the 'Professions' series of posters for Shell-Mex & BP including, for example, Anglers Prefer Shell. They also worked together on book jackets, murals and mosaics, signing their work with the monogram C&RE to reflect their joint and equal involvement. The emphasised that their initials were in alphabetical order, not "out of any sense of seniority."

From 1938 onwards, Rosemary Ellis taught art at the Royal School for Daughters of Officers of the Army in Bath while Clifford Ellis held a succession of posts at the Bath Academy of Art, where Rosemary would also teach a variety of subjects. During World War Two, Rosemary worked for the Recording Britain project, depicting architectural scenes in Bath. In 1946 the Ellises designed the entrance and a mural to the Britain Can Make It exhibition at the Victoria & Albert Museum. Between 1945 and 1982 they designed a total of 86 covers and dust jackets for the New Naturalist series of books and monographs published by Collins. The Ellises later moved to Devizes, Wiltshire.

== Legacy ==
The British Museum, the London Transport Museum, Manchester Art Gallery, Chippenham Museum, the Victoria and Albert Museum and MOMA hold examples of Ellis' designs. The Victoria Art Gallery in Bath and Bath Record Office hold archives of Ellis' papers and designs.
