= City of Bath Technical School =

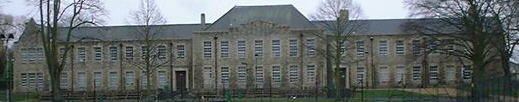

Location
- Brougham Hayes, Lower Oldfield Park; Bath, Somerset; England; 51.3808°N 2.3603°W

Information
- Motto: Nisi Dominus Frustra (Unless the lord is with us our efforts are in vain)
- Established: c. 1896 (adult evening classes), 1927 as a Junior School
- Closed: 1973
- Specialist: Technology & Sciences
- Head teacher: F.T. Naylor (1970)
- Staff: (in 1970) H.J. Alvis; A.J. Bishop; R.J. Cannon; Peter Coard; L.K. Webb; F.W. Cowlin; H.J. Crossland; H.D. Edwards; John M. Frew; W.W.J. Hammond; H. Harbour; G.N. Harris; C.J. Hayman; P.H. Horsler; E.K. James; R.E. Jones; P.M. Keating; J.W. King; J. Leyshon; T.D. Martland; M.R. Morgan; H.T. Mower; D.J.Cosnett; J.R. Papin; J.M. Pawson; Basil Rogers; E.J.E. Reynolds; F. Seale; S. Spencer; D.W. Treays; R. Minikin; E. Wood; J. Oxley; S. Edwards
- Gender: Boys
- Age: 11 to 18
- Enrolment: 465 (avg.1962–70)
- Houses: Allen – Gainsborough – Sheridan – Wood
- Colour: Red – Green – Yellow – Blue
- Web Archive: Current location (2009)
- Website: http://bathtechnicalschool.org.uk/

The City of Bath Technical School in Bath, Somerset, England had various roles from the late 19th century until 1970. It obtained its official name when technical schools were formally introduced in Bath between the years 1892 and 1896, and at first was housed in a new extension of the Guildhall. The school was transformed in the early 20th century, when it was combined with several other institutions, and then evolved through various sites and roles until its closure at Brougham Hayes, Lower Oldfield Park in 1973 after being renamed in 1971 as Culverhay School.

== Chronology ==
=== 19th century ===
The City of Bath Technical School has a complex history. Its evolution into a specialist school stems from early experiments in Technical Education in Somerset. Its creation arose out of the need to encourage young people to take an interest in the Sciences, and for them to be made aware of the Technical innovations that were occurring in the 19th century.

In 1832 the Somerset Industrial School for Boys was founded to accommodate boys at Brougham Hayes on the Lower Bristol road. It was aided in 1833 by the First Treasury Grant for Education (£20,000 for education of poor children). To be housed in a building which had originally been built as a barracks. The stated object of the home was "to reclaim abandoned boys, and to rescue those whose unhappy circumstances would inevitably lead them to crime and profligacy", inmates being drawn not only from Somerset but also from places at a considerable distance. (As the Somersetshire Home for Boys, it was still in existence in 1927, but had evidently closed by 1931.)

In 1851 the first government grant was introduced for technical education, followed in 1866 by the passing of the Industrial Schools Act 1866 (29 & 30 Vict. c. 118). The Somerset Certified Industrial School (previously known as the Somerset Industrial School), attendance rose to 180 pupils. The Elementary Education Act 1870 (33 & 34 Vict. c. 75) put in place the first statutory system of education in England, which was mainly elementary. The school leaving age at that time was 10 years. In 1884 there was a royal commission on Technical Education which was known as The Bryce Report.

The Technical Instruction Act 1899 was passed, and in 1890 a scheme was introduced called "Whiskey Money", under which local authorities could raise additional funds and use them for technical education. In 1892 technical training was started in Bath in a rented part of a large town house in Green Park, located near to the Somerset & Dorset line railway station, and a short distance from the city centre.

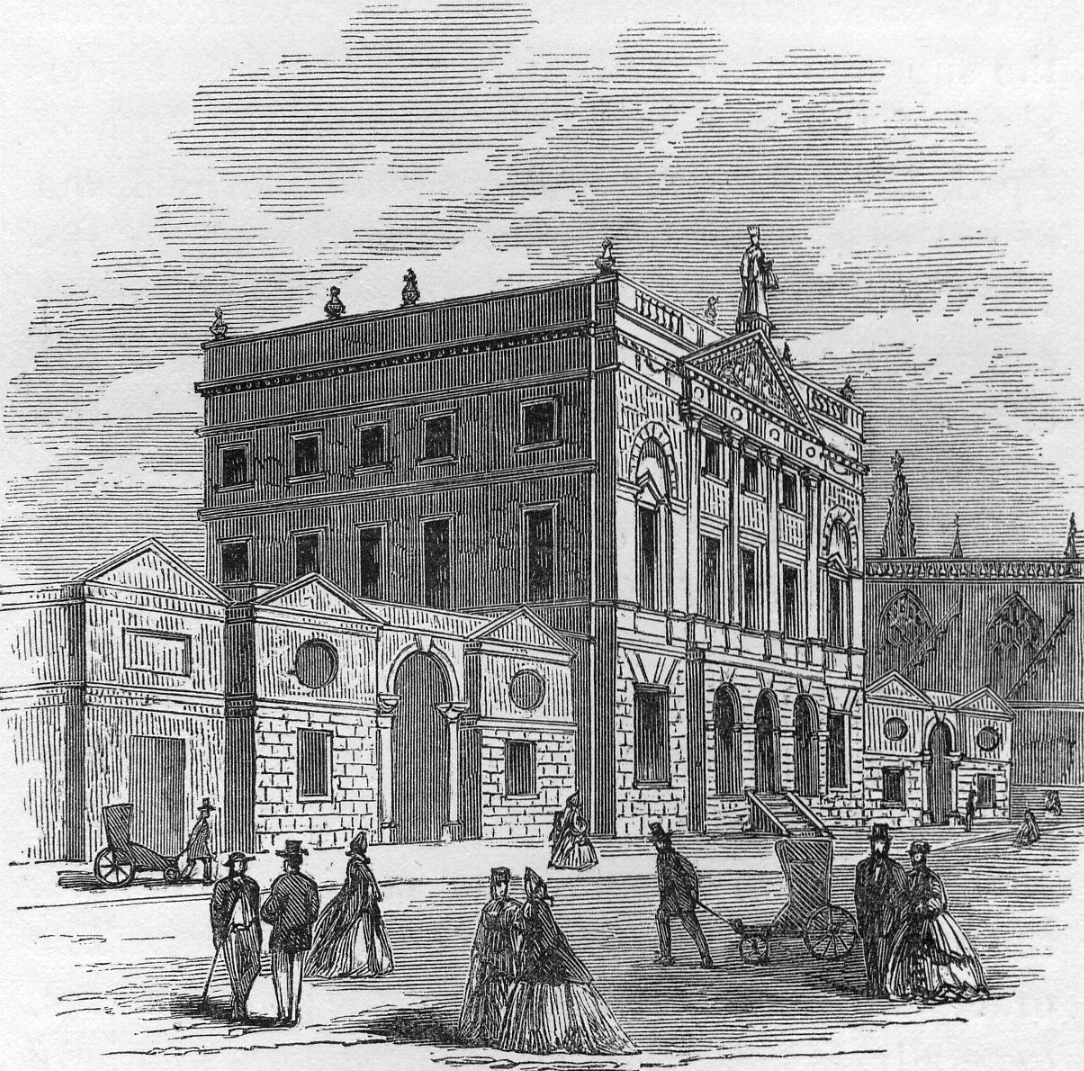
Bath Guildhall 1864, before the Technical School's extension was built

In 1893 the school leaving age was raised to 11 years. In 1896 the Bath Municipal Technical College opened in a newly built north wing of the Guildhall, offering evening classes in various newly formed Technical Schools. Among other schools of that era, the Bath School of Art at The Paragon and the Technical School at Green Park were moved into this new building. The Board of Education Act 1899 established the Board of Education to supervise the education system in England and Wales.

=== 20th century ===
1900 saw the school leaving age raised to 12 years. The Education Act 1902 laid down the system of secondary education, abolished school boards, and replaced them with the local education authorities of county and county boroughs councils. In the following year, 1903; the Bath Education Committee was formed and took over from the Bath and Twerton school boards. 1906 saw the introduction of the Education (Provision of Meals) Act 1906, under which education committees were authorised to spend money on meals for children. A report on technical education (the Haldane Report) was prepared. In 1907 the Education (Administrative Provisions) Act 1907 was passed, requiring local education authorities to provide medical inspection of children in elementary schools.

In 1910 Long Acre, Walcot was taken over as additional accommodation for technical training mainly as a domestic science college. In 1914 the Old Jail at Twerton was converted and opened as Twerton Technical Institute. 1 Stuart Place (formerly known as East Twerton Terrace), Caledonian Road Twerton, was built in 1842 as the governor's house in front of the jail built to replace the Bath City Gaol in Grove Street. It was one of the earliest single-cell prisons in the land; each cell was 13 feet (4.0 m) by 17 feet (5.2 m) by 9 feet (2.7 m) high and each had a water closet. The jail had closed in 1878 and in 1883 the Governor's House became a Technical Institute. Five years later in 1888 the jail became Goddards Sweet Factory; the factory closed in 1901 and the premises remained empty until 1914 when the entire premises, including the former Governor's House was refurbished and taken over as an outpost of the Bath Technical College catering for a wide range of technical classes.

In 1916 a Junior Commercial Day School opened at the Bath Technical College. In 1917 the General School Certificate and Higher School Certificate were introduced. In 1918 the Education Act 1918 introduced a national system of public education. The school leaving age was raised still further to 14 years. 1920 became the year that state scholarships were instituted in many schools in Bath. In 1926, a report of the committee on the education of the adolescent was commissioned (The Hadow Report), the first government report to suggest the integration of the secondary and elementary systems in England.

In 1927, a new daytime Junior Technical School opened at Bath Technical College (to supplement the original adult evening classes), and in 1929 a Junior School of Art – Bath School of Art and Design – followed, with the Junior School of Homecrafts being established in 1933. On the Ordnance Survey map of 1932 a large field is shown in front of the Somerset Boys' Home and by 1934 it had been transformed to become a hockey pitch and tennis courts for the Domestic Science College. In 1934 the Domestic Science College moved from Long Acre, Walcot to Brougham Hayes and in 1935 Bath Technical College moved from the North Wing of the Guildhall to Lower Borough Walls, taking over the buildings that were vacated when the Royal United Hospital moved to the new hospital in Combe Park.

In 1936 the Education Act 1936 is passed, providing financial help to local authorities for building new church schools. Two years later, the report of the committee with special reference to grammar schools and technical high schools (The Spens Report) recommended expansion of technical schools in England to keep pace with the ever-changing logistical requirement of the many outposts in the British Empire. The need to maintain a dominant role (with the aid of advanced technology) was deemed a necessary step to take just one year before the outbreak of World War 2.

=== Second World War ===
In 1939 the Admiralty took over many large buildings in Bath, including the Domestic Science College and the hockey pitch and tennis courts, and did not return them until late 1944. The pitch and courts were transformed when the Admiralty erected hutments upon them. In the Second World War, Messrs. W.G. Walters, a light engineering firm, took over part of the Twerton Institute and erected a temporary building in front of the former Governor's House.

In 1942, C .J. (Bill) Hayman transferred from the West Central School to Bath Technical School. In the following in year, 1943, a report from the committee on the curriculum and examinations in secondary schools (The Norwood Report) was published. A blueprint of the Education Act 1944 advocated that there be three types of secondary school. In 1944 the Education Act 1944 was passed by Parliament. It replaced almost all previous legislation and laid the foundations for the current education systems. In 1945 St. Peter's Church Hall in Dorset Street, Twerton and the nearby annexe were leased for five years by the City Council.

=== Postwar ===
It was December 1945 before the Bath Technical College resumed control of the entire building at Stuart Place and by September 1946 it was called the headquarters of the School of Building. The Twerton Institute remained an important part of the Bath Technical College; metal-work and wood-working classes were held there for the pupils of the Bath Technical School. After the Second World War, the College began a new life with the Departments of Engineering, Commerce, Languages and Home craft all based at the Lower Borough Walls while the Department of the Building stayed on at the Twerton Institute and took over the hutments at Brougham Hayes. In 1946 Bath City Council published its plans for education in response to the requirements to the Education Act 1944, which proposed that the Secondary Technical School (at the Bath Technical College) would become a separate school. By 1947 the Bath Education Committee had erected more hutments at Brougham Hayes and redecorated the existing hutments. This school separation came into operation at St Peters Hall, Twerton in September 1947 when the first 52 11-year-old pupils were admitted. The Further Education Sub-Committee (of the Bath Education Committee) agreed in 1947 that, in view of the use of St Peter's Hall in September by the eleven-year-olds, a second classroom could not be made available to East Twerton Junior School, next door to the hall. They continued to use this building until Weymouth House in the city centre became available in September 1949.

In February 1948, the Council appointed Henry Burt Toft BSc, as Principal of the Technical College and Headmaster of the Secondary Technical School; he took up his duties when Major L.J. Castle retired in May 1948;. He was then Headmaster, Royal Latin School, Buckingham and a former rugby international having captained the Barbarian F.C., Lancashire and England. Mr Toft was not in post long before a decision was made to allow him to concentrate on the College by appointing a separate Headmaster for the Secondary Technical School and the Council in March 1949 decided to advertise for this new post. Thomas John Nicholas MA BSc, headmaster of the Secondary Technical School, Wigan was appointed; he was 44 when he started in September 1949. Mr C. J (Bill) Hayman then became the deputy headmaster. A press report at the time said, "When the Bath Training College for Domestic Science moves out of the Brougham Hayes building, the Secondary Technical School will move in".

Weymouth House School was the main base for the City of Bath Technical school from September 1949 until July 1960. The building was formerly used by The Bath and District National School. The site was formerly the gardens of Weymouth House (designed and built by William Killgrewin in the early 1700s), part of the house was demolished and the remaining part was incorporated into the new school in 1816. There were 1000 pupils and it was one of the first to be conducted according to the educational philosophy of Dr. Andrew Bell. The school was of an unusual circular design and it was entirely demolished in 1896 when Weymouth House School was built on the site. The School and St James Church next to it were severely damaged in the Bath Blitz of April 1942; at the time the school had 120 senior pupils and 121 infants. All the children were temporally transferred to other schools (many of the seniors went to Walcot Parochial School) while the building was made safe. Infants used the ground floor until July 1949, when satisfactory arrangements had been made to enable the infants school to close. The upper floors were used by the Technical College for evening classes until 1950, and from that date the Technical School was the sole user. In 1957 St. James Church next to the School was demolished, and the site around the school was redeveloped. In 1962 Weymouth House School was demolished, and Marks and Spencer and Woolworths (now Littlewoods) developed their stores to cover the site of the school, the playgrounds, St James Street South, Weymouth Street and the site of St James Church.

In 1954 pupils from surrounding areas in South Gloucestershire, Somerset and Wiltshire were included into the intake for the first time in its role as a specialist secondary technical school. A sixth form was introduced and a full range of clubs had developed. At this time there were few state educational schools in the west of England offering such facilities. The changes in technology that are taken for granted today, and the equipment found in modern educational establishments, were a direct result of contributions made by pupils that attended these specialist schools.

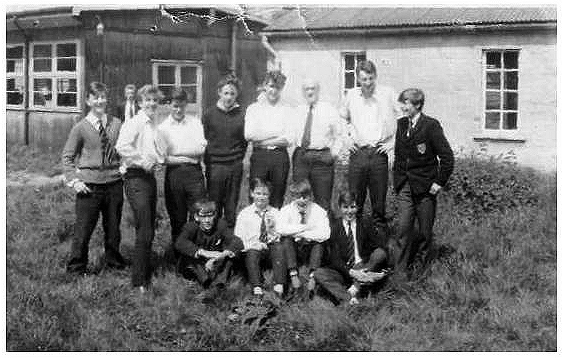
Hutments (now demolished), in grounds of City of Bath Technical School, Brougham hayes, Bath. Raymond F. Jones (Teacher and Bath Abbey organist), with a small group of 5th Form pupils in 1964.

In 1960 the City of Bath technical School moved to Brougham Hayes into the building formerly used by the Domestic Science College. A new gymnasium block was added to the building. In 1964 the new workshop block was completed, as a result the hutments were demolished and the grounds restored to former use as a small sports facility at Brougham Hayes. Twerton Technical Institute closed shortly afterwards and in 1990 it was transformed into forty one flats and two bungalows. The main sports facilities were now located at Bradford road, Combe Down; some considerable distance from the school building. Annual sports day events were held at the Norwood running track situated where the University of Bath has now been built. The many pupils that travelled to school from outlying districts benefited from the fact that the new school was adjacent to the main Great Western Railway line. The Oldfield Park Halt station was only a short walk away. The car was not the primary form of transport at that time, most people relied upon public transport such as Trains and Buses.

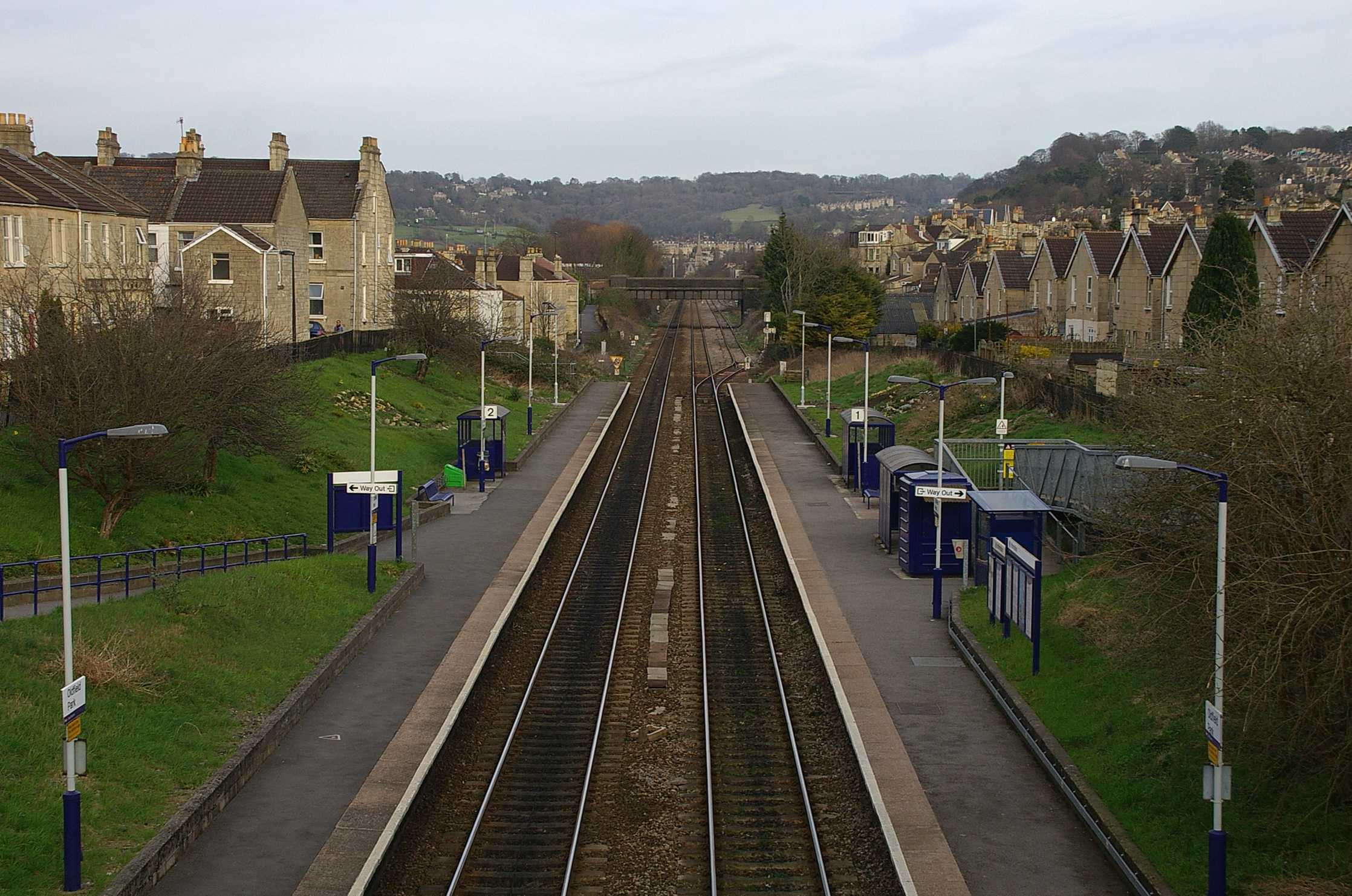
Oldfield Park railway station, showing Brougham Hayes bridge in the distance

In 1965 The labour government declared its intention of ending pupil selection (at 11 years of age) and eliminating separation in secondary education. As a result, in 1966 Bath Education Authority issued a report on secondary education in the city which was followed by various proposals but ultimately led to this school being disbanded.

=== Closure ===
The last term at the City of Bath Technical School concluded in July 1970. In February 1971 it was renamed Culverhay School. Over the summer break of 1973 its Brougham Hayes facilities were decommissioned and the buildings converted for subsequent use as the lower school of the newly created Hayesfield Girls' School. Former pupils of the City of Bath Technical School and a contingent from the smaller Bath Art School were amalgamated with the larger body of the former Secondary Modern, Westhill Boys' School (founded in 1956) to become Culverhay Comprehensive School. In preparation the West Hill Boys' School buildings, originally constructed in 1956 at Rush Hill, were joined on an adjacent site by purpose-built 1970s science, mathematics and sixth form blocks, and the existing Victorian premises of a former GP practice became an additional staff room. The closure of the City of Bath Technical School took place despite a protest letter to the Bath Education Authority in 1970 (from the then headmaster F.T. Naylor and the teaching staff) that the proposal to introduce a new system of technical education in Bath would possibly result in a lowering of educational standards.

== Emblem ==
City of Bath Technical School emblem

The school had three badges during its history. The first was the Bath Technical College badge which was a simple design – BTC in thin red letters within a shield outlined with a thin red line- and this lasted until the Bath Technical School was renamed in 1949. The second badge lasted until early 1954 and is recorded on the school photograph of March 1950 and the school website. The third badge, which lasted until 1970, was designed in early 1954 by Mr Ken Box, Head of Art and included the motto, 'NISI DOMINUS FRUSTRA'. The literal translation is 'UNLESS THE LORD IN VAIN'. This is not much help. The motto is based on Psalm 127 and the more usual translation is 'EXCEPT THE LORD APPROVE WE LABOUR IN VAIN' while another translation might be 'UNLESS THE LORD IS WITH US OUR EFFORTS ARE IN VAIN'. The badge has the Book of Knowledge open to show the motto, over the City wall with the Avon beneath. The open pages are white with yellow ends, the City wall is yellow, the river Avon white and the background a shade of blue.

== See also ==
- Bath College of Domestic Science
- Bath School of Art and Design
- Bath College
- Education in Bath, Somerset
