= Larkhall, Bath =

District of Bath, England

Coordinates: 51.399°N 2.348°W

Larkhall
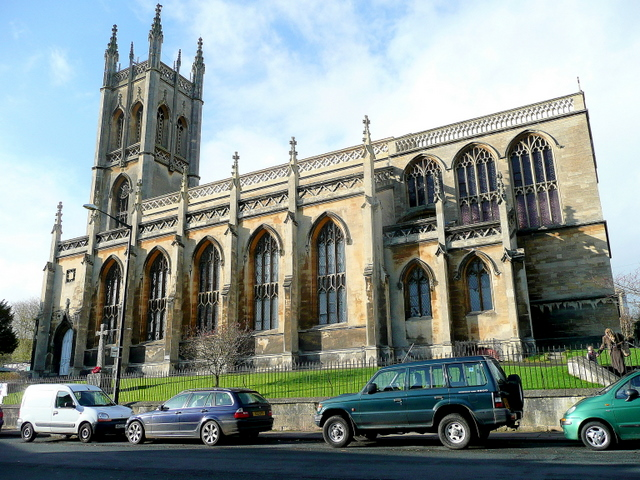
- St Saviour's Church

- Location within Somerset
- OS grid reference: ST758667
- Unitary authority: Bath and North East Somerset
- Ceremonial county: Somerset
- Region: South West
- Country: England
- Sovereign state: United Kingdom
- Post town: Bath
- Postcode district: BA1
- Dialling code: 01225
- Police: Avon and Somerset
- Fire: Avon
- Ambulance: South Western
- UK Parliament: Bath

Larkhall is a residential district in the city of Bath, England, north-east of the city centre. The district began to develop in the early 19th century to house the working population of the city.

== Description ==
Many parts of Larkhall have good views up to Solsbury Hill, the Iron Age hill fort made famous by Peter Gabriel.

In 2015, the Sunday Times described Larkhall as a 'trendy urban village'.

Larkhall is a residential district 1.2 miles from the centre of Bath with local shops including Goodies Deli, Larkhall Butchers, the Beaufort Bookshop, Larkhall Farm Shop, a dentist, Leak gift shop, a pharmacy, a pet shop, a hairdressers, Larkhall Deli Cafe, Ma Cuisine, Thali Curry House, two garages and a Chinese take-away. There are three pubs, The Rose and Crown, The Larkhall Inn and the Bladud's Head. Other amenities include Bath Artist Printmakers artist co-operative and The Rondo Theatre. Larkhall Square is at the centre of the shopping area. The local church is St Saviour's Church.

Every year, since 2009, Larkhall has hosted the Larkhall Festival with abundant games, food, raffles and stalls. The festival's main venue is the New Oriel Hall but the Rose & Crown and Larkhall Inn pubs, Leak Gift shop, Alice Park and St. Mark's School also join in.

== Services ==
It has an infant and junior school, St Saviour's CofE Infant School and St Saviour's CofE Junior School. There is also a secondary school, St Mark's School.

Larkhall has a village hall, the New Oriel Hall, which has a range of classes and clubs for all ages, and a community library.

Larkhall is served by the number 7 and 6 bus service which runs every 30 minutes.

== Sport and leisure ==
Larkhall has a Non-League football club Larkhall Athletic F.C. who play their home games at Plain Ham ground.

The Larkhall Recreation Ground, known as 'The Backfields', has a children's play ground, basketball hoops, and good views of Little Solsbury Hill.

Alice Park, located on Gloucester Road, is an 8-acre memorial park with lawns, a children's playground, a community garden of fruit trees and vegetable beds, six tennis courts and a summer cafe.
