= Martin Froy =

British painter (1926–2017)

- Born: 9 February 1926; London
- Died: 26 January 2017 (aged 90)
- Education: University College London Slade School
- Known for: Painting

Martin Froy (9 February 1926 – 26 January 2017) was a painter of figures, interiors and landscapes; part of a school of British abstract artists which flourished between the 1950s and 70s.

== Early life ==
Froy was born in London on 9 February 1926. He studied at the Slade School of Fine Art between 1948–51, under William Coldstream, co-founder of the Euston Road School. Froy's painting Europa and the Bull won the Slade Summer Composition Competition in 1950.

== Career ==
Froy was elected as the First Gregory Fellow in Painting from 1951–4 by a panel including T.S. Eliot, Herbert Read and Henry Moore. A number of his paintings from this time were displayed in a joint-exhibition with Lucian Freud at the Hanover Gallery in London in 1952.

Froy went on to become Head of Fine Art at the Bath Academy of Art, where he taught from 1954–65. He also regularly taught at the Slade School of Art between 1952–55. He became Head of Painting at the Chelsea School of Art (1966–72). Froy was Trustee to the National Gallery (1972–79) and the Tate Gallery (1975–9). He also participated in overseas art visits and residencies funded by the Leverhulme Research Award and the British Council in Italy and Russia. He became Professor of Fine Art at the University of Reading (1972–91), and he remained in Reading with his wife Catherine after his retirement.

== Exhibitions ==
Exhibitions include Hanover Gallery, London (1952, 1969), Leicester Galleries, London (1961), RWA, Bristol (1964), Arnolfini Gallery, Bristol (1970), Serpentine Gallery (1983) and his work has been included in mixed exhibitions in the UK, New York, Chicago and Italy. Examples of Froy's work can be found in a number of public and private collections, including the Tate Gallery,̺ the Museum of Modern Art in New York and the Arts Council of Great Britain. He has also created a number of murals, including those at Morley College, London and Belgrade Theatre, Coventry. His most recent exhibition Martin Froy and the Figurative Tradition took place at the University of Leeds in 2014.
