= Norton Radstock College =

Coordinates: 51°17′24″N 2°27′06″W

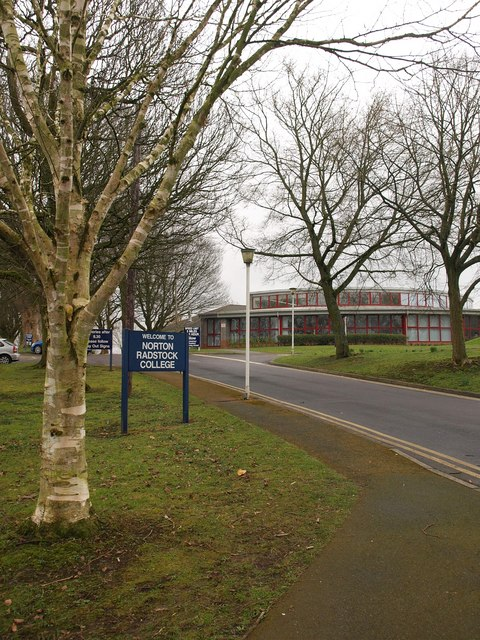
Norton Radstock College in 2009

Norton Radstock College was a further education college in Westfield, Somerset serving Midsomer Norton, Radstock, Westfield, Keynsham and surrounding districts in Bath, Bristol, Wiltshire and Somerset, England. In April 2015 it merged into Bath College, which continued to operate on the Norton Radstock College site as the Bath College Somer Valley campus.

== History ==
The college served 1,000 full-time students and 5,000 part-time students. Courses ran at specialist sites throughout the area, including Keynsham, Midsomer Norton and its main site in Radstock.

The College had steadily expanded since it opened in 1947 to serve the Somerset coalfields. As a Community College, it had expanded its range of vocational programmes, and had become an established part of the community. The college worked with local employers to provide training programmes that met the needs of both employers and employees. These ranged from short skills workshops, through to NVQs, BTEC, Higher National Diplomas and apprenticeships.

Norton Radstock College had over 154 partners across 24 countries in Europe, with whom it worked to develop vocational education and training through EU funded programmes such as Leonardo.

In late 2014, after years of financial problems and poor Ofsted reports, the college decided to merge with City of Bath College. In March 2015 the merger was confirmed, and it was announced that from April 2015 the merged college would be named Bath College. The former Norton Radstock College campus was renamed Bath College Somer Valley, and the Bath campus was named Bath College City Centre.
