= Rondo Theatre =

Theatre in Bath, England

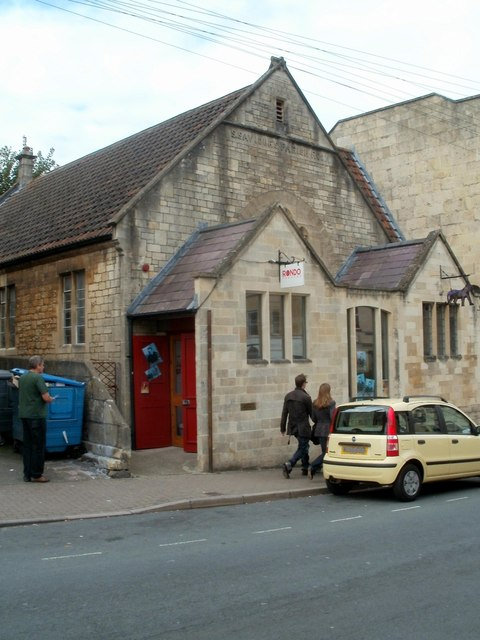
- The Rondo Theatre
- Interactive map of Rondo Theatre
- Address: St Saviours Road, Larkhall; Bath; England
- Coordinates: 51°23′48″N 2°20′43″W
- Capacity: 105

Construction
- Opened: 1989

Website
- https://www.rondotheatre.co.uk

The Rondo Theatre is a performing arts theatre in Bath, England that was established in 1989. The theatre is located in the former church hall of St Saviour's Church, Larkhall. The building was purchased in 1976 by Doreen and Wilf Williams, who subsequently founded The Rondo Trust for the Performing Arts and converted the building into a 105-seat theatre. The facility received extensive renovations and upgrades after the receipt of lottery grants in 1996 and 2003. The theatre also maintains an active programme of outreach activities, including a youth theatre, a scriptwriters group, theatre workshops, and afternoon tea concerts.

== History ==
The Gothic-revival church hall dating from the early 1830s was repurposed when the Rondo Trust acquired it in 1976; following refurbishment work that added the bar and seating, the venue opened as the Rondo Theatre in 1989. National Lottery capital funding in 1996 created purpose-built dressing rooms, a foyer and office space, and a second grant in 2003 enabled a full technical refit.

During its shutdown in 2020 due to the COVID-19 pandemic, the venue received £50,000 from the UK Government's Culture Recovery Fund, allowing it to reopen the following year with social-distanced performances. In 2023 the Rondo was one of many organisations affected when Bath & North East Somerset Council ended its discretionary arts grants programme.

== Programme and reception ==
The theatre presents around 120 professional and community performances each year, spanning new writing, touring fringe work, stand-up comedy, music and small-scale opera. Resident community groups include the Rondo Theatre Company and a long-running youth theatre scheme that operates the Rondo Drama Club and Rondo Summer School. The B&NES Destination Management Plan identifies the theatre as an important part of Bath's cultural infrastructure.

Reviewers from the Bath and Bristol area regularly write about performances at the venue. For example, Bristol24/7 praised Dumb Blonde Theatre's production of Hell (July 2022), written by Emily Malloy, for supporting new writing. The Bath Echo also described Greedy Pig Theatre Company's performance of Spoil Me (July 2023) as "complex" and "riotous".
