= Beechen Cliff School =

Location
- Alexandra Park, Kipling Avenue; Bath, Somerset, BA2 4RE; England; 51.3723°N 2.3600°W

Information
- Type: Academy
- Established: 1896 (predecessor school)
- Trust: Midsomer Norton Schools Partnership
- Specialist: Technology
- Department for Education URN: 136520 Tables
- Ofsted: Reports
- Chair of Governors: Helen Eastwood
- Headmaster: Timothy Markall
- Gender: Boys (Coeducational sixth form)
- Age: 11 to 18
- Enrolment: 1,325 (2017)
- Houses: Byron; Kipling; Milton; Shakespeare
- Colour
- Former name: City of Bath Boys' School
- Website: http://www.beechencliff.org.uk/

Beechen Cliff School is a boys' secondary school in Bath, Somerset, England, with about 1,150 pupils. Its earliest predecessor school was founded in 1896.

There are around 930 boys in years 7 to 11 and a co-educational sixth form of 402 pupils. The school offers the option of state boarding. It is located just south of the city centre near Alexandra Park, up a hill from Bear Flat on the A367, a major route from the south of the city into Bath.

== History ==
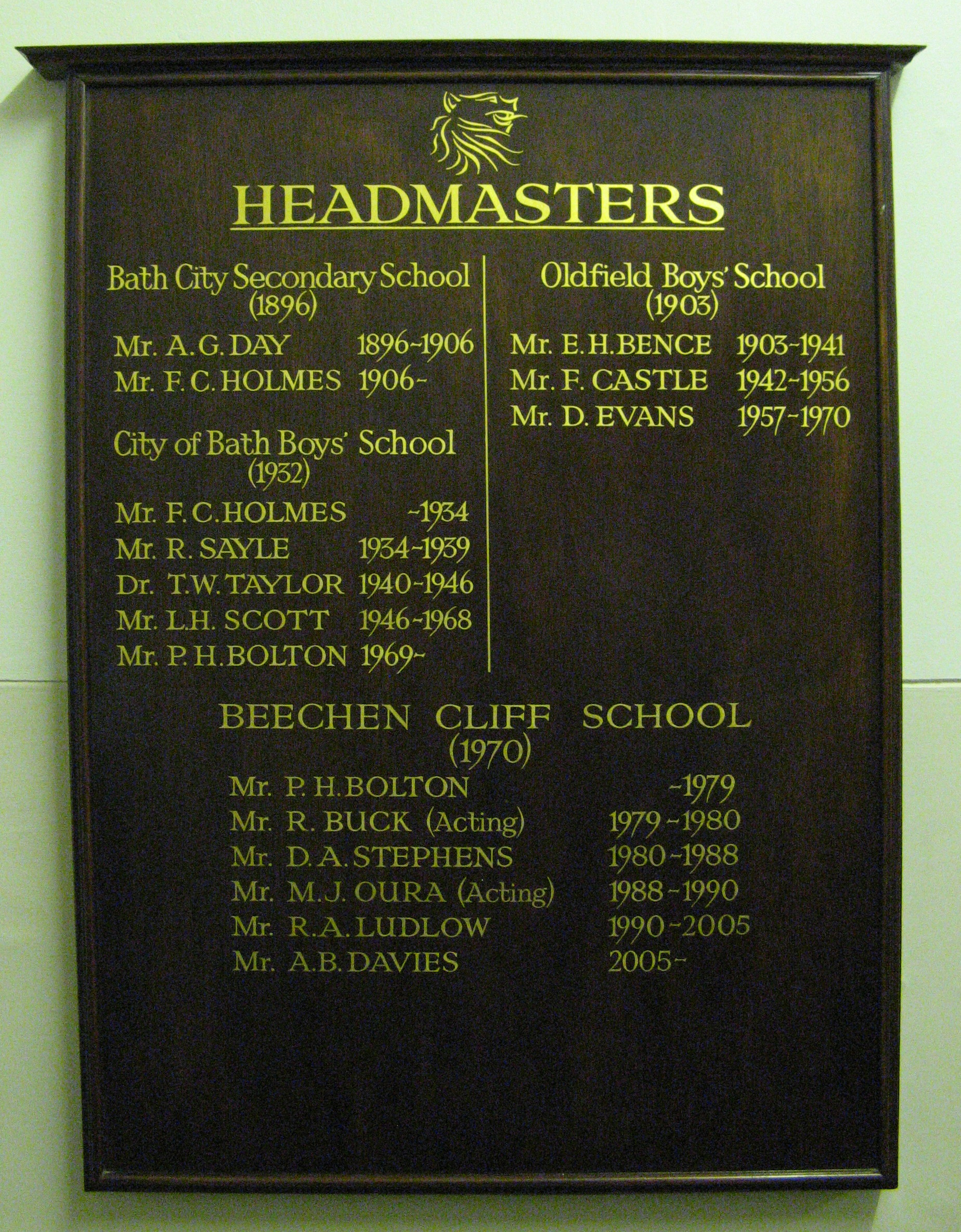
List of headmasters

The school began in 1896 as Bath City Secondary School in the Guildhall.

It moved from the Guildhall Technical College to its present site at Beechen Cliff in 1932 when it was renamed the City of Bath Boys' School.

It changed to its present name in 1970 when the City of Bath reorganised secondary education. The grammar school was amalgamated with Oldfield Boys' School, a local secondary modern school founded in 1903, to form a comprehensive school.

On 7 August 1988, on a school climbing expedition in the Briançon region of the French Alps, the 57-year-old headmaster Donald Stephens fell 300 feet (91 m) to his death. Fifteen pupils and three members of staff were on the expedition, training for a walk up Mount Kenya, and witnessed the tragic incident. A library has been established in his memory.

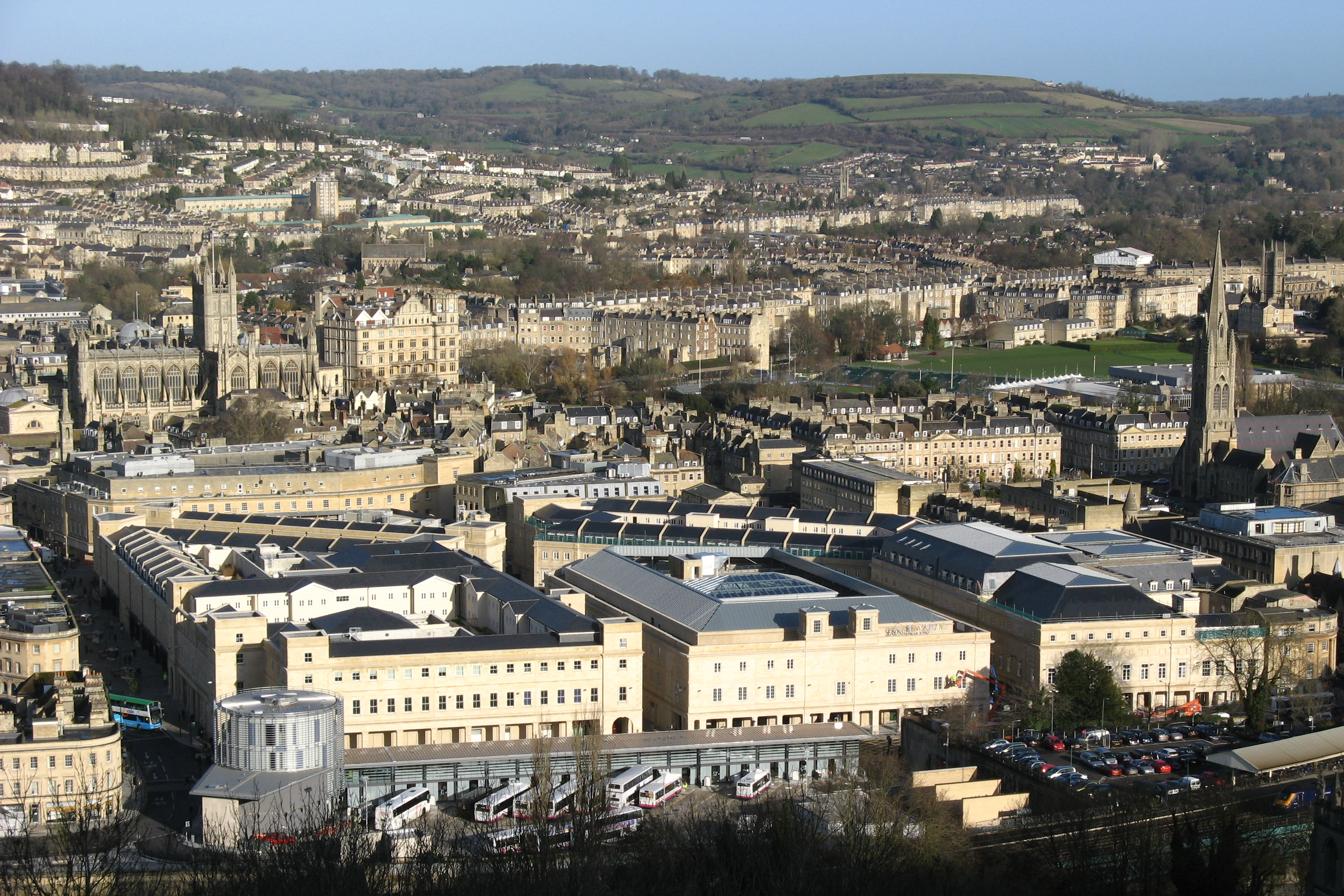
Bath from the top of Beechen Cliff, in Alexandra Park adjacent to the school

A review of Bath secondary provision by Avon County Council in the 1980s proposed that the school be closed and replaced with a sixth form college on the same site serving the whole city. Partisans of the school, however, took advantage of new legislation to obtain grant-maintained status for the school, taking it out of local authority control, which the then Government permitted despite a policy that schools would not be allowed to use grant-maintained (GM) status as a way of avoiding closure.

In February 1990 Avon County Council took the Secretary of State for Education and Science, John MacGregor, to the High Court to prevent the school gaining GM status and thus fatally undermining its Bath schools reorganisation plan; on 24 February Mr Justice Hutchison ruled in favour of the council, obliging the Secretary of State to reconsider his decision. On 30 March the Minister accordingly reconsidered his decision, but came to the same conclusion as before, that the school should be GM funded. In a vote, 55% of parents supported the change of status. At a further judicial review hearing by the High Court on 15 May, Lord Justice Mustill upheld the Minister's decision. The Director of Education at Avon, Dr Christopher Saville, said he was 'very disappointed'.

Former pupil and winner of the 1993 Nobel Prize in Physiology or Medicine for the discovery of the mechanism of gene-splicing, Richard J. Roberts, donated a substantial part of his prize money to help the school build a new science centre, called the Richard Roberts Science Centre.

Beechen Cliff School acquired the specialist school status of Technology College in 1997, and with the demise of grant-maintained status became a Foundation school with similar characteristics in the early 2000s. In 2008 the school was awarded Trust school status. In 2011 it became an Academy School, and along with Hayesfield School for girls, Ralph Allen School, Three Ways School (special education) and Wellsway School (in Keynsham) it constitutes the Bath Education Trust, whose governors include representatives of Rotork Ltd, the University of Bath and Bath Spa University.

Since 2014 the school has offered boarding places for boys at the school.

In July 2018 the school was severely criticised following an unannounced Ofsted inspection, which downgraded its rating for overall effectiveness from outstanding to inadequate. The report was particularly critical of the handling of a serious safeguarding incident earlier in 2018 in which pupils chained a black pupil to a lamppost and whipped him in a "mock slave auction", and of the effectiveness of the leadership and management. The report stated the school was misusing extended study leave as a form of unlawful exclusion. The chair and vice chair of governors resigned. The inspection had been unannounced because the Chief Inspector of Schools had concerns about safeguarding, leadership and the quality of education at the school. The headmaster had decided to expel three of the seven pupils involved, but a panel of three governors in a disciplinary hearing decided the three pupils should not be permanently excluded. The police investigated the "mock slave auction" incident, and seven pupils admitted involvement in a hate crime, two undergoing a restorative justice "community resolution process" involving the victim.

In September 2018 the Schools Adjudicator found that the school's admission policy was unreasonable and unfair, stating that the "school has a less deprived intake than the other state-funded schools in the city" due to rules such as giving priority to siblings of Hayesfield Girls' School pupils, allocating 40% of places to children living in affluent areas north of the River Avon and 20% to children living outside Bath. The Adjudicator ordered changes to 16 aspects of the school's admissions policy.

In 2019 Beechen Cliff School, on the advice of the Regional Schools Commissioner, became part of the Midsomer Norton Schools Partnership multi-academy trust of ten secondary schools and nearly twenty primary schools.

== Environment ==
In the early 1930s the main building was built on the site of Lyncombe Hill Farm to enable the move from the Guildhall.

In the early 1970s sixth form, science, technology, humanities and sports buildings were built on the eastern playing fields to support the merger of schools into a comprehensive school.

In 1983 an avenue of elm trees, which ran within an ancient hedge along the road to the south of the lower playing fields, contracted Dutch elm disease and had to be felled; replacement trees of different species were planted by subscription of local residents, though not all survived to maturity. In 2000 the school proposed to sell off the lower part of its playing fields for housing development. Although the latest school inspection report had remarked that the playing fields were small for the school, the required consent was obtained from the DfEE, but there was vigorous opposition from the local community and planning permission was refused.

In 1997 the science building was extended, part funded by former pupil Sir Richard J. Roberts from his Nobel Prize award, and the arts building relocated into a new building enabling improvements to the canteen.

== Partnerships ==
Beechen Cliff is home to schoolboys on the full-time training model at Southampton. Beechen Cliff and Bath Rugby have an Academic and Sporting Excellence (AASE) programme at the school and play in RFU's National AASE League.

The school is home to Bath Theatre School and together have a musical theatre partnership that puts on a production once a year.

== Outdoor education ==
The school takes part in a number of annual challenges that include the Centurion Challenge (a 100-mile walk from Bath to Hungerford and back in 48 hours), Duke of Edinburgh, Ten Tors (teams complete hikes of up to 55 miles across Dartmoor), 100 mile Coast to Coast Cycle ride across Devon and the Three Peaks Challenge.

The Centurion Challenge is an annual long-distance event organised by Beechen Cliff School, Bath. The event is open to pupils of the school and usually takes place on the first weekend of July. The objective of the challenge is to walk/run 100 miles in 48 hours.

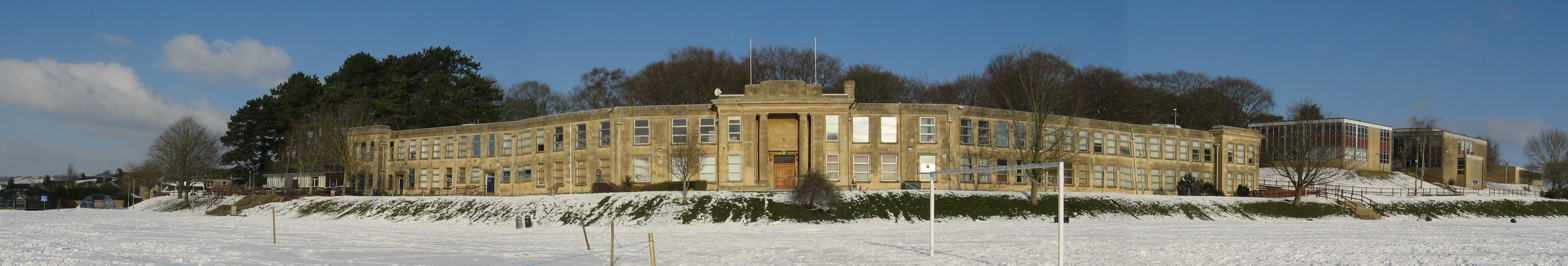
Beechen Cliff School main building, with sixth form and technology buildings on the right

== Notable alumni ==
- Billy Burns, Rugby Union player for Ulster Rugby & Ireland
- Adam Campbell, actor
- Tom de Glanville, Bath Rugby player
- Jason Dodd, Director of Southampton F.C. youth academy
- Jason Gardener, gold medal winner in the Men's 4 × 100 metres relay at the 2004 Summer Olympics
- Gabriel Hamer-Webb, Rugby Union player at Bath Rugby & England U20
- Andrew Lincoln (Andrew James Clutterbuck), actor
- Charlotte McDonnell, musician and vlogger
- Max O'Leary, football player for Bristol City
- Miles Reid, Bath Rugby player.
- Dan Rivers, ITV News Correspondent (formerly with CNN and CNN International)
- Curt Smith, musician (Tears for Fears)
- Tony Spreadbury, rugby union referee
- Paul Tisdale, manager of Exeter City football club
- Zak Vyner, football player for Bristol City
- Amy Williams, gold medal winner in the skeleton at the 2010 Winter Olympics, the first British individual Winter Olympics gold medal since 1980

=== City of Bath Boys' Grammar School ===
- Roy Ascott, artist and President of the Planetary Collegium
- Sir Roger Bannister, first man to run a mile in less than 4 minutes
- Raymond Leppard, musician and conductor
- Rev Christopher Morgan, Bishop of Colchester since 2001
- Robert Orledge, scholar of early twentieth century French music
- Arnold Ridley, Dad's Army actor and playwright
- Sir Richard J. Roberts, 1993 Nobel Laureate
- Sir John Sawers, chief of the Secret Intelligence Service (MI6), Ambassador to the United Nations 2007-9
- Sir Graham Watson, Liberal Democrat MEP and leader of the Liberal Democrats in Europe
