= Ralph Ellis (painter) =

English painter (1885–1963)

Ralph Gordon Ellis (1885–1963) was an English painter and designer of inn signs.

== Life and work ==
Ralph Gordon Ellis was born in Arundel on 31 January 1885 at no.12 the High Street, overlooking the square. His father William was in business as a taxidermist.

On leaving school, Ellis went away to London as an apprentice to a furniture draughtsman and designer, but never settled to the work. Instead, he turned to painting—an interest of his father's—by day making his living painting houses and after work attending evening classes in drawing and painting.

In 1913, three years after his marriage to Gertrude Seymour, a stonemason's daughter, he opened a little shop in her hometown of Bognor as an 'oil and colour man', selling home decorating materials and artists' supplies as well as his own paintings.

During the First World War, Ellis saw action with the Royal Sussex Regiment and the Queen's (Royal West Surrey) Regiment. Injured by shrapnel in July 1917, he was discharged and returned to England. He then enrolled at Slade School of Fine Art in London where he studied until 1919.

Relocating to Arundel in 1920, Ellis soon established his reputation as a portrait and landscape painter and, in a highly specialised field of art, as a designer and painter of inn signs. By the end of his commercial career he had painted well over two hundred signs for the Henty & Constable brewery alone.

Ellis retired from his inn sign painting business in 1951 and dedicated the rest of his life to landscape painting. He died in Arundel in 1963—a commemorative blue plaque was erected by West Sussex County Council on his home at 47 Maltravers Street, Arundel in May 1995.

== Exhibitions ==
He exhibited a portrait of Arthur Greaves, J.P at the Royal Academy of Arts in 1931; El Rio in 1933. An exhibition on the life and work of Ellis is on permanent display at Arundel Museum. More than 50 of his inn signs were included in the 1936 Inn Signs Exhibition at London's Building Centre.

== Signs painted for inns and hotels ==
- Cricketers (Donnington)
- Coach & Horses (Compton)
- Fox & Hounds (Funtington)
- Black Horse (Binsted)
