= Saint Gregory's Catholic College =

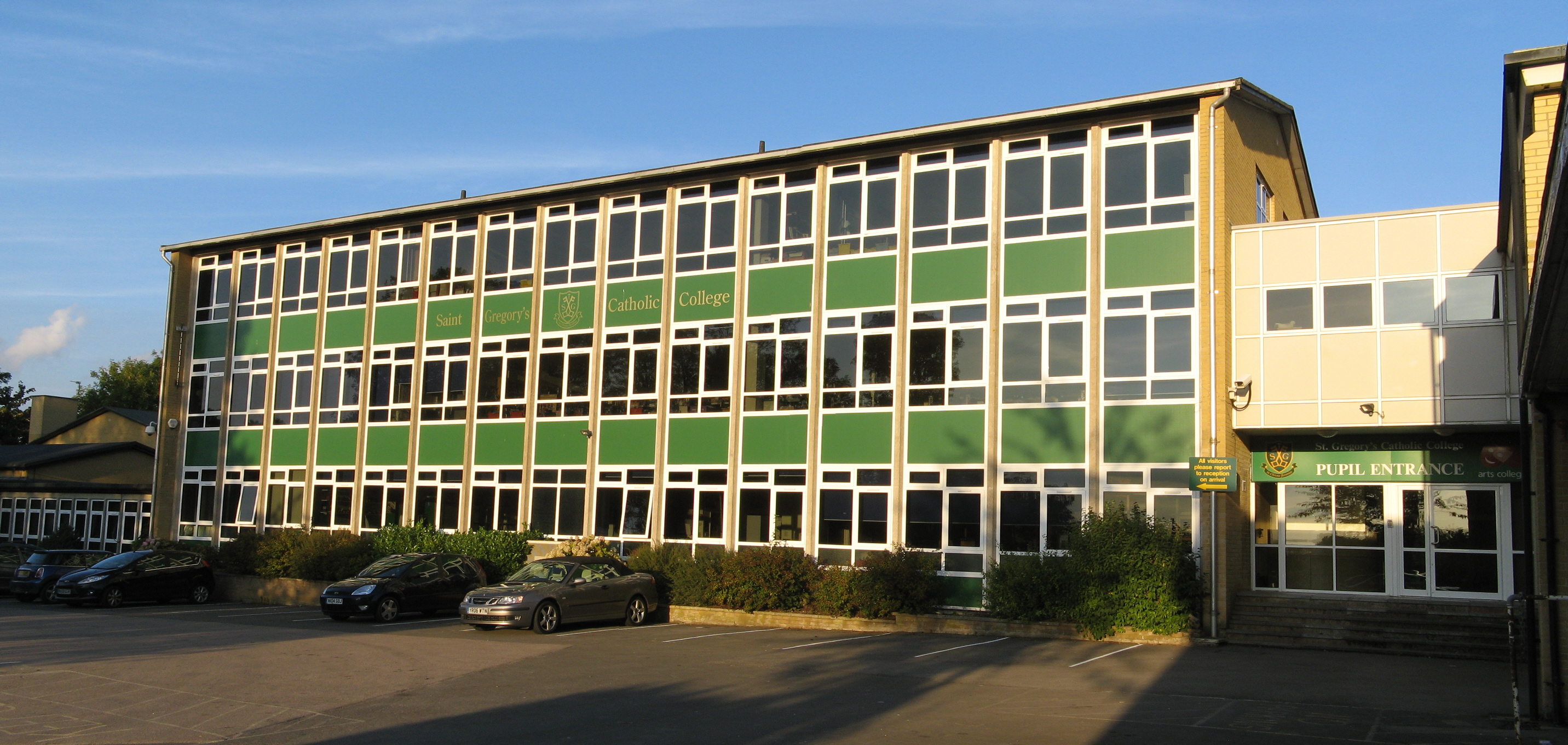
- St Gregory's Catholic main building

Location
- Combe Hay Lane; Bath, Somerset, BA2 8PA; England; 51.3538°N 2.3813°W

Information
- Former name: Saint Gregory's Comprehensive School
- Type: Voluntary aided school
- Motto: "In Christ we flourish"
- Religious affiliation: Roman Catholic
- Established: 1979; 47 years ago
- Founder: Unknown
- Local authority: Bath and North East Somerset Council
- Department for Education URN: 109329 Tables
- Ofsted: Reports
- Headteacher: Melissa George
- Chaplain: Matthew Robinson
- Secondary years taught: Years 7 - 13
- Gender: Coeducational
- Age: 11 to 18
- Enrolment: 1,015
- Capacity: 1050
- Sixth form students: 136
- Average class size: 30
- Classrooms: 45
- Houses: Francis, Romero, Bakhita, Stein.
- Colours: Green; Gold; White
- Website: http://www.st-gregorys.bathnes.sch.uk/

Saint Gregory's Catholic College in Odd Down, Bath, England is a Roman Catholic, co-educational secondary school with a sixth form. It was renamed from Saint Gregory's Comprehensive School, which opened in 1979. It teaches around 1000 pupils, its current head teacher is Melissa George.

The school has specialist status in Performing Arts and Science. In 2008 and 2013, it was rated as "Outstanding" by Ofsted, compared to the most recent inspection in 2022, being "Good".

There are four houses named after famous saints: Stein, Romero, Bakhita and Francis.

In 2011 the school formed a soft federation with St Mark's School in Larkhall, with St Gregory's former headteacher, Raymond Friel, being appointed as executive headteacher in charge of both schools. The federation built a joint sixth form at St Gregory's, which opened in 2013 with the name The New Sixth.

Saint Gregory's Comprehensive School was formed in 1979 through the amalgamation of Cardinal Newman School located at the site of the new school, and La Sainte Union Convent School founded in 1858 and located on Pulteney Road in central Bath (now Bath Law Courts).

== Alumni ==
- Siobhan-Marie O’Connor (2007-2012). Swimmer and Olympic silver medallist.
- Wilf Scolding (2001-2006). Actor in Game of Thrones.
- Ann Widdecombe. Former Conservative MP, was a former pupil of the Bath Convent Girls' School before it merged and became St Gregory's.

== See also ==
- Education in Bath, Somerset
