= Hayesfield Girls' School =

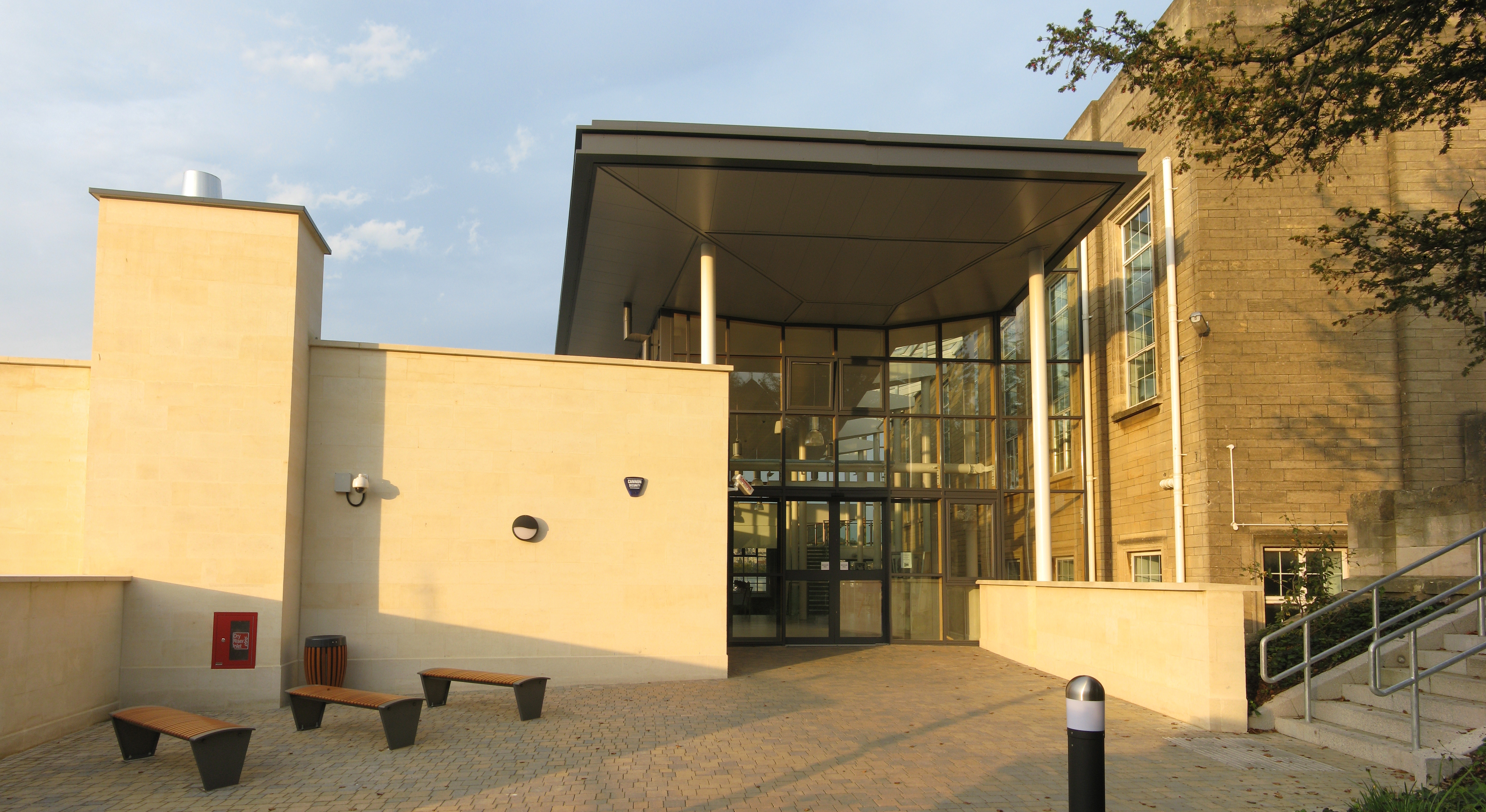
- Upper school entrance

Location
- Upper Oldfield Park and Brougham Hayes; Bath, Somerset, BA2 3LA (upper); BA2 3QU (lower); England; 51.3766°N 2.3715°W

Information
- Former name: Hayesfield School Technology College
- Type: Academy
- Motto: Achieving Ambitions
- Established: 1973; 53 years ago
- Specialist: Technology College
- Department for Education URN: 136966 Tables
- Ofsted: Reports
- Chair of Governors: Annette Hayton
- Head: Philip White
- Gender: Female with a co-educational sixth form
- Age: 11 to 18
- Enrolment: 1,226 (2017)
- Website: www.hayesfield.com
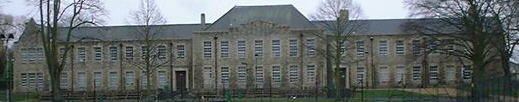
- Lower school

Hayesfield Girls' School is an all-girls secondary school with a co-educational sixth form located in Bath, England. In August 2011, the school became an academy. The school operates from two main sites, about a seven-minute walk apart. The campus at Brougham Hayes accommodates STEM subjects such as Science, Technology and Maths, and the Upper Oldfield Park campus hosts the Performing Arts, English and Sports faculties.

== History ==
The first school to occupy the upper school site was Bath City Secondary School for Girls in 1922. This school had previously operated in the Guildhall alongside the boys' Bath City Secondary School (which ultimately became Beechen Cliff School). By 1939 it had become known as the City of Bath Girls' School (CBGS), a grammar school for girls, for ages 11–16 and a small 2-year sixth form. Although it was, and remains, a state school, in those days its structure and subject matter was modeled on that of an English public school for boys, with uniforms and an emphasis on "school spirit".There was a total enrollment of some 500 girls, all of whom had passed a standard 11 + examination.(Meryle Secrest, née June Doman, student of CBGS from 1941 to 1948.) After World War II the school was enlarged with a pair of Edwardian villas at 39 and 41 Upper Oldfield Park. Later development included a technology block in 1957, a modular dining hall building, and modular classrooms in 1973.

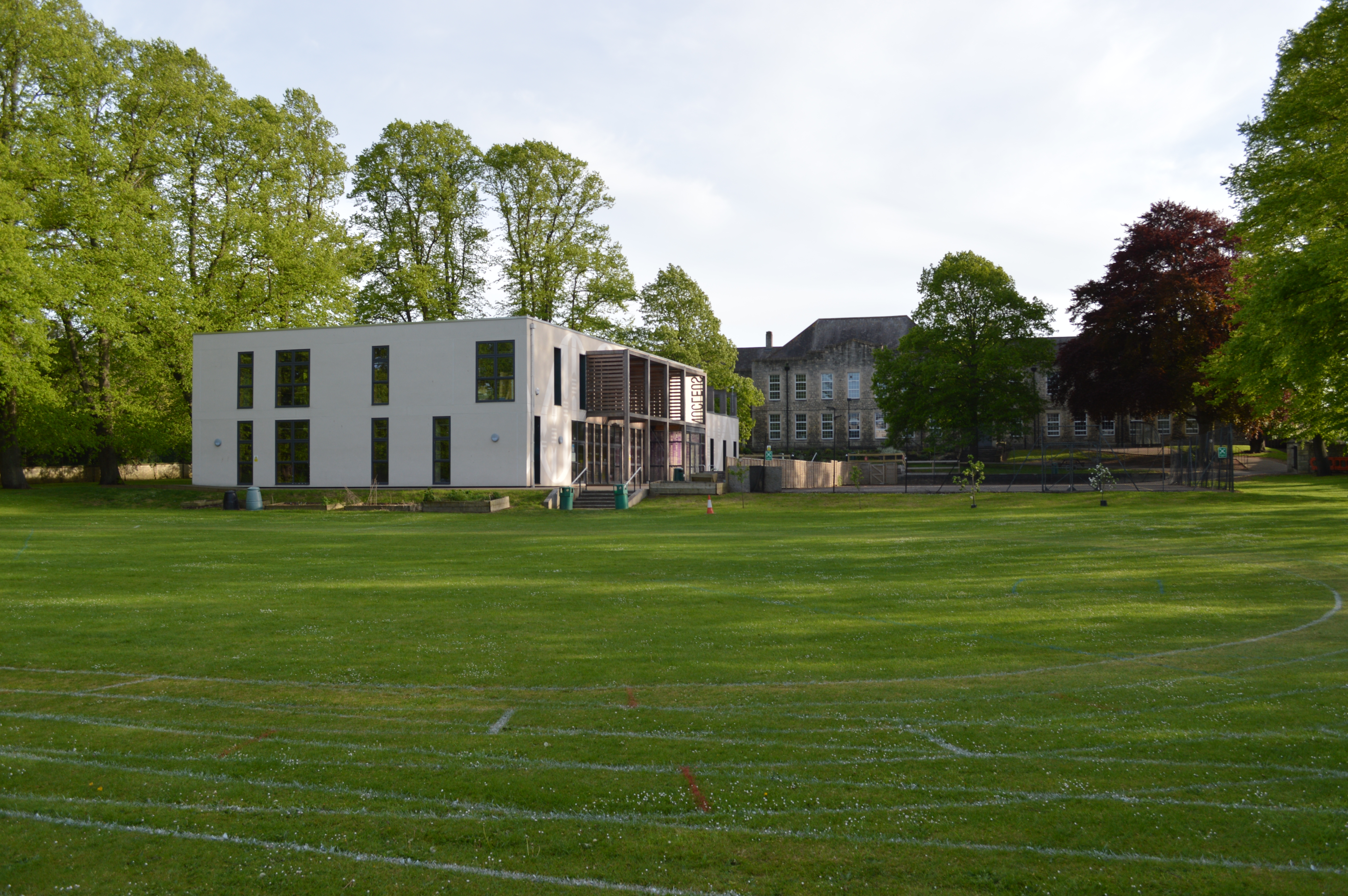
Lower school field and Nucleus science block, with the former barracks / main building behind

The lower school site was originally known as the Somerset Industrial School for Boys in 1832. It was founded to accommodate 180 boys at Brougham Hayes on the Lower Bristol road, it had originally been built as a Barracks. It became a Domestic Science College in 1934, (formerly part of Bath Technical College). It was then occupied by the City of Bath Technical School for boys. West Twerton Secondary Modern School occupied the site after World War II.

Hayesfield School was formed in 1973 when the City of Bath reorganised secondary education by merging grammar schools and secondary modern schools to form comprehensive schools. West Twerton Secondary Modern School and City of Bath Girls' Grammar School were merged to form Hayesfield School.

The school was renamed Hayesfield School Technology College when it obtained Technology College status in 1999, but renamed again in 2009 becoming Hayesfield Girls' School.

In 2010 the school began construction of a new building designed by architects AWW, at the upper school site that houses a sports hall, theatre, cafeteria, fitness room, music classrooms, music practice rooms and an open learning centre. The work cost £10 million, funded by the sale of the school's playing fields in Odd Down for a new supermarket. The extension, called the Hayesfield Performing Arts and Sports Centre, opened in early 2011.

The school is a foundation member of the Bath Education Trust, an alliance of Hayesfield Girls' School, Beechen Cliff School, City of Bath College, the University of Bath and the local business Rotork. The aim of the Trust to provide opportunities for cooperation with shared resources and staff across the sites and to provide a link to business for the students and staff.

== Academics ==
The school has specialist Technology College and Foundation school status. The school has 1,133 pupils as of 2013 including 237 in the sixth form, and operates on two major sites less than half a mile apart. Whilst it used to be that years 7-9 were based at the Brougham Hayes campus and the upper school was based on the Upper Oldfield campus, it is now split based on subjects with students 'commuting' between the two campuses. Brougham Hayes houses all Stem subjects and foreign languages whilst, the Upper Oldfield park campus houses English, Arts, and Humanities.

There are out of hours clubs, including choirs, a wind band and an orchestra, and various school bands.Pupils play cricket, rounders, netball and tennis. Subjects taught include drama, dance, music and engineering. Pupils produce their own student newspaper production.

The school offers the Bath Education Trust Award, which is a combination of academic study, work experience and leisure interests, which helps to develop the broad range of skills and competencies that employers seek. The BET Award is a certificated programme of transferable skills training and practical learning.

== Sixth Form ==
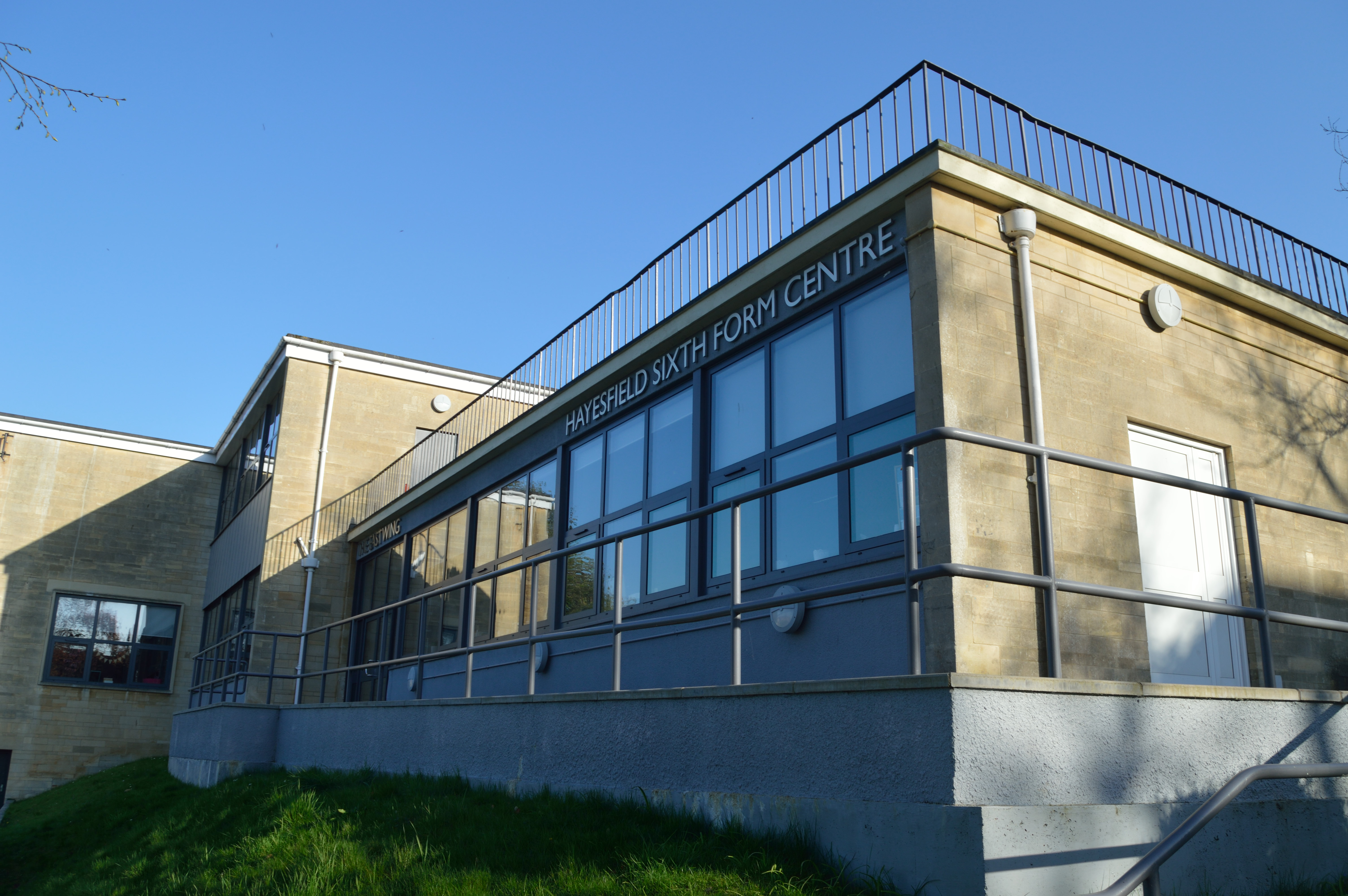
Sixth form centre

Hayesfield has a co-educational sixth form. The old Technology block in the Upper Oldfield Park campus was converted during 2014 to become the East Wing, a specialist Sixth Form Centre.

== Alumni ==
- Anya Shrubsole, 2009 ICC Women's World Cup winner
- Amy Williams, Olympic Gold medalist

=== City of Bath Girls' School ===
- Patricia Brake, actress
- Kath Pinnock, Baroness Pinnock, Lib Dem Leader from 2000 to 2006 of Kirklees Council
