= Bath School of Art and Design =

Art college in Bath, England

- Former names: Bath School of Art
- Established: 1852; 174 years ago
- Parent institution: Bath Spa University
- Location: Bath, Somerset, England, United Kingdom; 51°23′38″N 02°22′17″W
- Website: www.bathspa.ac.uk

Bath School of Art and Design is an art college in Bath, England, now known separately as the Bath School of Art, Film and Media and the Bath School of Design. It forms part of the Bath Spa University whose main campus is a few miles from the city centre at Newton Park. The two schools are based at the Locksbrook Campus, on the River Avon, in the west of the city. The Heads of School are Darren Kerr (School of Art, Film and Media) and Kristin Doern (School of Design).

== History ==
Bath School of Art was founded in 1852 following The Great Exhibition of 1851. The Bath Directory for 1856 shows its location at Weymouth House (roughly the rear of the present Marks and Spencers store) and its Master as Anthony Carey Stannus, an Irish painter noted for marine scenes and who later helped establish a society which evolved into the Royal Ulster Academy. By the 1858 edition he had been succeeded by John J. Drummond, who by 1860 had set up his own Mr Drummond's School of Art at 3 Bladud Buildings, and later (1862) at 5 Princes Buildings almost opposite.

The original School moved to Hetling House, Westgate Buildings, an ancient building which George Newenham Wright in his Historic Guide to Bath (1864) says had been garrisoned for the Royalists in the Civil War, adding that "the School of Design now occupies the principal and older part". The Master for a few years was John Hill, who later continued as a private tutor and artist at his home in Combe Down until about 1884. The School's syllabus was "in connection with Marlborough House", which meant the Government School of Design and Practical Art.

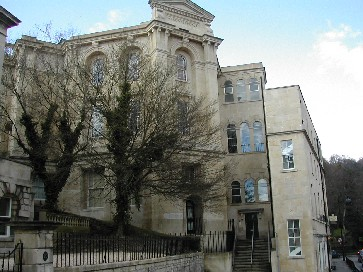
The Star Inn and Walcot School

By 1866 the School was at 33 Paragon, opposite The Star Inn, and the Master was Robert Campbell Puckett, whose 1871 work "Sciography, or radial projection of shadows" was published by Chapman & Hall of London. The tuition fee was one guinea per quarter, according to the school's prospectus published as a one-page advertisement in the annual Directories. Courses were "in connection with the Science and Art Department, South Kensington". A branch was opened at The Corridor for evening classes. Later Head Masters were William Harbutt (1874) (the inventor of Plasticine); John Charles Swallow (1878); and Charles M. Hodges (1880). By 1884, Harbutt was teaching at The Paragon Art Studio, 15 Bladud Buildings.

By 1894 the School had come under the umbrella of the Bath Technical Schools and in April 1896 these occupied the new north extension of the Guildhall, including the retitled School of Art, Art Crafts and Design. The new Head Art Master was Frank Griffin, replaced by Nathaniel Heard by 1906. By 1912 the Master was Henry Wilkinson who had been taught by Ruskin and whose son (also Henry) became a well-known engraver. Successors were D.S. (probably Douglas) Andrews (1920) and Arthur Payne (1922).

The Technical Schools evolved into the municipal Bath Technical College which moved to the building in Beau Street vacated by the Royal United Hospital when it moved to Combe Park. The process was overseen by the new head art master, the artist Paul Fripp (1934–37). Then came the important appointment of the long-serving Clifford Ellis (1937–1972). The School of Art moved to 7 and 8 Green Park early in World War II, when the Beau Street building was taken over by the Admiralty. This new home was destroyed by bombs in April 1942, and temporary refuge was found at the home of the artist Walter Sickert at Bathampton. Sickert had been a part-time teacher at the School but had died in January 1942. Clifford Ellis is said to have cut the lettering on Sickert's headstone.

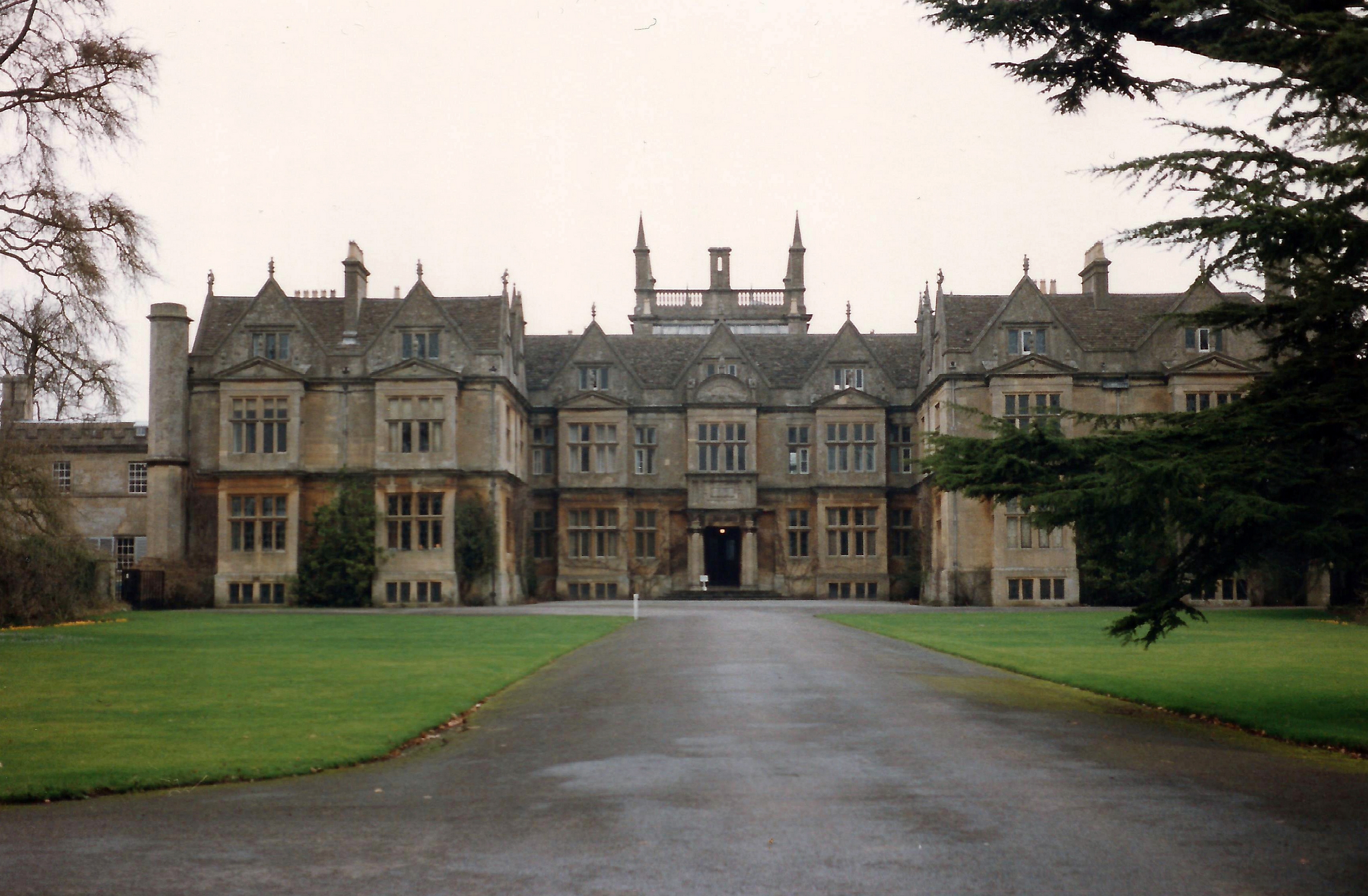
Corsham Court

In November 1942 the School began its association with 99 Sydney Place. A note in the local history section of Bath Central Library records the opening of the new premises by Sir Kenneth Clark, then Director of the National Gallery and Surveyor of the King's Pictures. However, in 1946, following extensive wartime bomb damage to the original premises, the School (then called Bath Academy of Art) was transferred to the historic mansion Corsham Court in Corsham, the home of the artist Lord Methuen. At that time, there was a post-war emphasis on training teachers of art. For the next 26 years, the Principal of the Academy was Clifford Ellis, who installed the artist William Scott as head of painting and Kenneth Armitage as head of sculpture.

The nascent City of Bath Training College was first based in another house at Sydney Place before its move to Newton Park, meaning that by 1947 (along with Bath College of Domestic Science then still at Brougham Hayes) all the major components of the future Bath Spa University were now in existence.

The 1983/4 prospectus contained a short history, stating that from 1946 the Academy ran two courses at Corsham, one for teacher training and the other a National Diploma in Design with a small intake, with interaction between the two being seen as a particular asset. The Robbins report of 1963 led to more standardised teacher training provision, and the Academy's course was phased out by 1968. The introduction of Art Foundation courses in 1963 led the Academy to begin such a course, based at the Sydney Place site which had been retained for part-time classes for the general public. In 1974 control of the institution passed to the new Avon County Council and from 1 September 1983 the Academy became part of Bath College of Higher Education.

In 1985/6 the Art and Design courses, now of bachelor's degree status, began the process of moving from Corsham to newly converted premises at Sion Hill, Bath, largely vacated by the switch of Home Economics and related courses to new premises at Newton Park.

=== Locksbrook campus ===
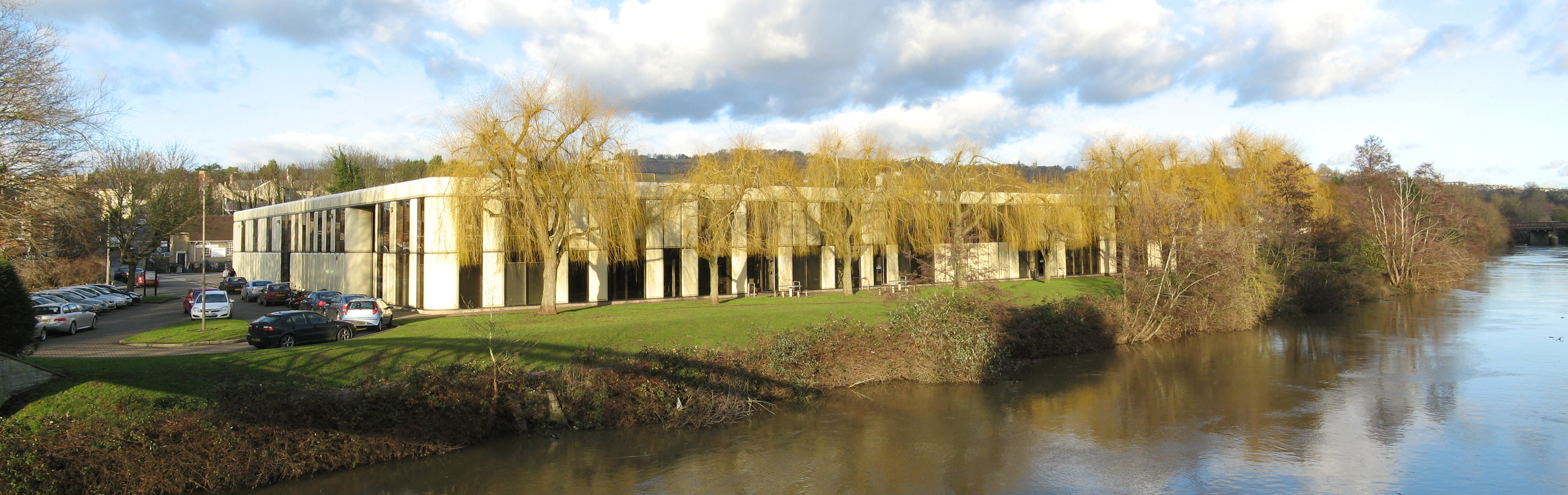
The former Herman Miller factory on the River Avon in Bath became the main location for the school in academic year 2019/20

In 2016 Bath Spa University purchased the former Herman Miller factory in Locksbrook, on the River Avon in the west of Bath, a 1970s listed building designed by Farrell & Grimshaw, to become the main home for an expanded and consolidated Bath School of Art and Design. The School and its courses are thus based across just two buildings, Sion Hill and at Locksbrook, rather than up to seven.

== Curriculum ==
Courses at the School include Graphic Communication, Creative Art, Fine Art, Digital Design, Fashion and Textile Design, Ceramics and MA Design (Interaction Design, Ceramics, Brand Development or Textiles), Master of Fine Art.

== Personalities ==
Visiting artists and tutors have included Kenneth Armitage, William Scott, Terry Frost, Peter Lanyon, Sir Herbert Read, Adrian Heath, Bernard Meadows, Howard Hodgkin, Anthony Fry, Martin Froy, John Colbeck, John Furnival, Gillian Ayres, Peter Potworowski, Claes Oldenburg, James Greaves, Peter Kinley, James Tower, John Hoskin, Mark Lancaster, Michael Craig-Martin, John Ernest, Anthony Hill, Richard Hamilton, Roger Clarke, Jim Dine, Tom Phillips, Jeremy Gardiner and Morton Feldman.

== Notable alumni ==
- Paul Bird, artist and teacher
- Hubert Dalwood, sculptor
- Roger Deakins, cinematographer
- Laura Ford, artist
- Katherine Gili, artist
- William Harbutt, artist
- Salima Hashmi, artist
- John Hitchens, artist
- Howard Hodgkin, artist
- Donald Locke, artist
- Leila Locke, artist
- Sevan Malikyan
- John O'Neill, video game designer
- Edward Piper, painter
- Peter Randall-Page, artist
- Nigel Rolfe, performance artist
- Axel Scheffler, illustrator
- Jean Spencer, abstract artist
- Judith Trim, English studio potter
