= Three Ways School =

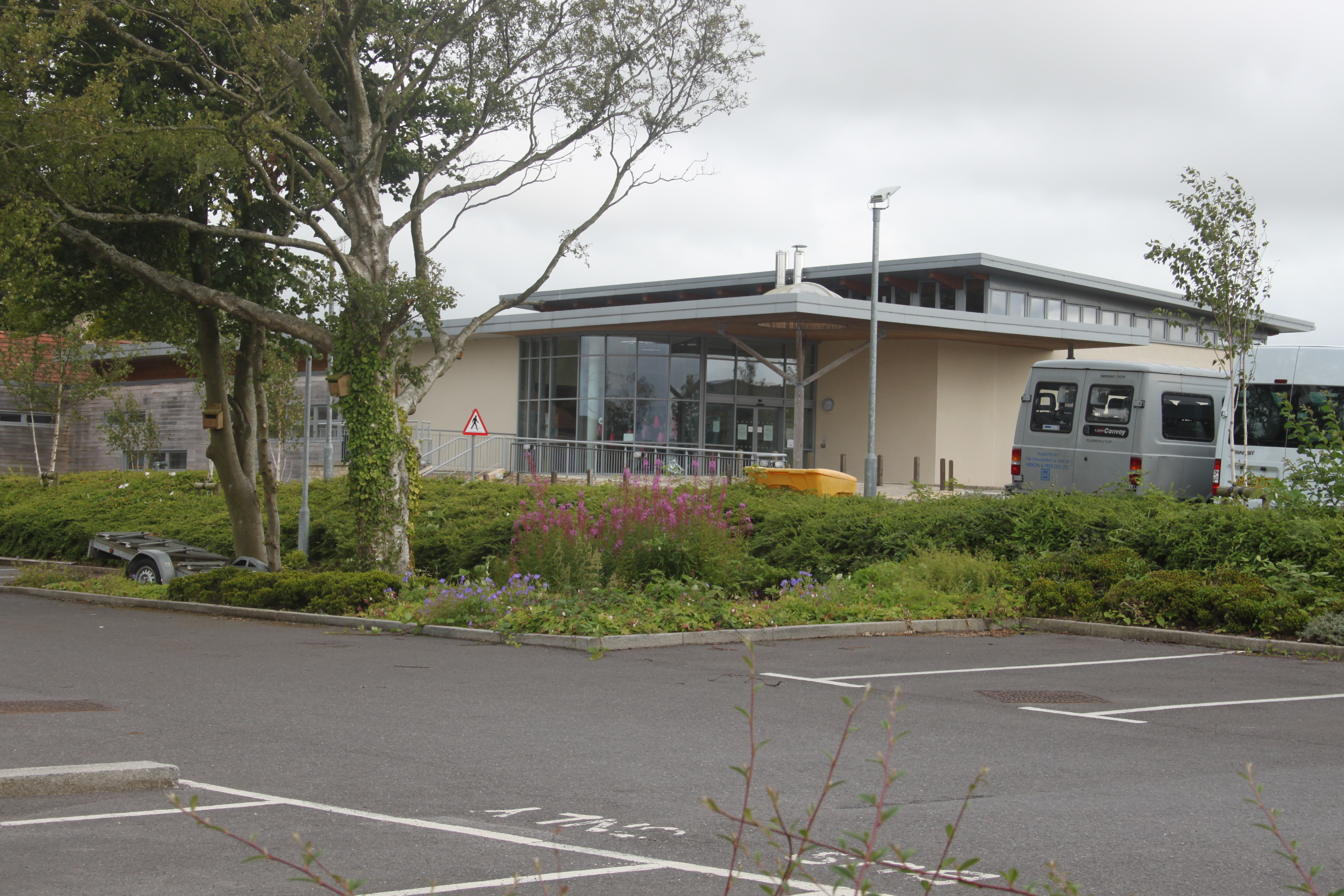

Location
- Frome Road; Bath, Somerset, BA2 5RF; England; 51°21′22″N 2°22′15″W

Information
- Type: Special school; Academy
- Established: 2005; 21 years ago
- Department for Education URN: 140079 Tables
- Ofsted: Reports
- Gender: Coeducational
- Age: 4 to 19
- Website: www.threeways.bathnes.sch.uk

Three Ways School is a coeducational special school with academy status, located in the Odd Down area of Bath in Somerset, England.

It was created in 2005 from the amalgamation of three special schools in Bath, the Royal United Hospital School, Summerfield School and Lime Grove School, but only moved into its new £12 million, purpose built facilities after they were opened on 17 November 2007, by High Sheriff of Somerset, David Medlock.

The buildings, grounds and facilities cater for children and young people with a range of disabilities. The school is divided into small family units from the nursery for the very youngest children to a post 16 centre. The facilities include a sensory theatre and Hydrotherapy pool. The school also has partners with Ralph Allen School.

Architects for the scheme were Cardiff-based B3, and it won the “Inspiring Design — special needs” in the British Council for School Environments (BCSE) inaugural awards in 2008.

The school converted to academy status on 1 September 2013.
