= St Mark's School, Bath =

St Mark's School
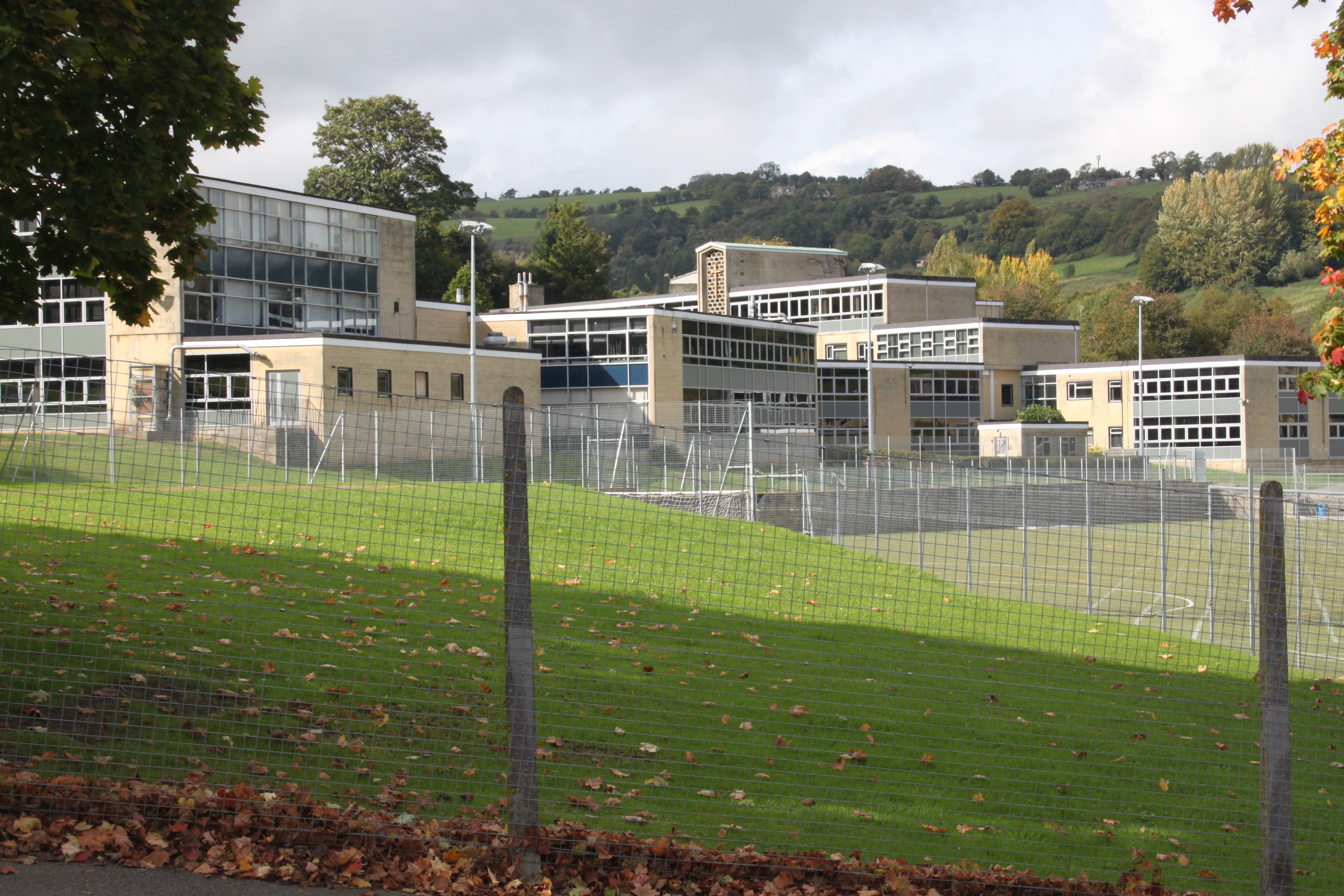

Location
- Bay Tree Road; Bath, Somerset, BA1 6ND; England
- Coordinates: 51.3989°N 2.35086°W

Information
- Type: Academy
- Religious affiliation: Church of England
- Local authority: Bath and North East Somerset
- Trust: Midsomer Norton Schools Partnership
- Department for Education URN: 147801 Tables
- Ofsted: Reports
- Headteacher: Clare England
- Gender: Coeducational
- Age: 11 to 16
- Enrolment: 370 as of 2020
- Website: http://www.st-marks.org.uk/

St Mark's is a coeducational Church of England secondary school and sixth form located in Bath, Somerset, England. The school attracts pupils from Bath, Larkhall and Fairfield Park.

In September 2009, 150 pupils were enrolled at the school. By 2020, this number rose to 370 pupils.

In 2010, Bath and North East Somerset Council called a meeting to discuss the future of educational provision for the children of Larkhall and the school put forward alternative proposals to its closure. In 2011 the school formed a soft federation with St Gregory's Catholic College in Odd Down, and an executive head teacher, Raymond Friel, was appointed to be in charge of both schools. The federation has built a new joint sixth form, The New Sixth at the St Gregory's Catholic College site.

Previously a voluntary aided school administered by Bath and North East Somerset Council, in May 2020 St Mark's School converted to academy status. The school is now sponsored by the Midsomer Norton Schools Partnership.

== Achievements ==
St Mark's School received an ‘Ofsted’ inspection in June 2015, and was judged to be a ‘Good’ school across the following key areas: leadership and management, behaviour and safety of students, quality of teaching and the achievement of students. Further to this, the school was also recognised as a ‘Good’ Church of England school in its most recent SIAMS inspection, under a new framework. The pastoral and academic support, as well as the small school ethos and value for each student were noted as particularly positive areas.
