= Ralph Allen School =

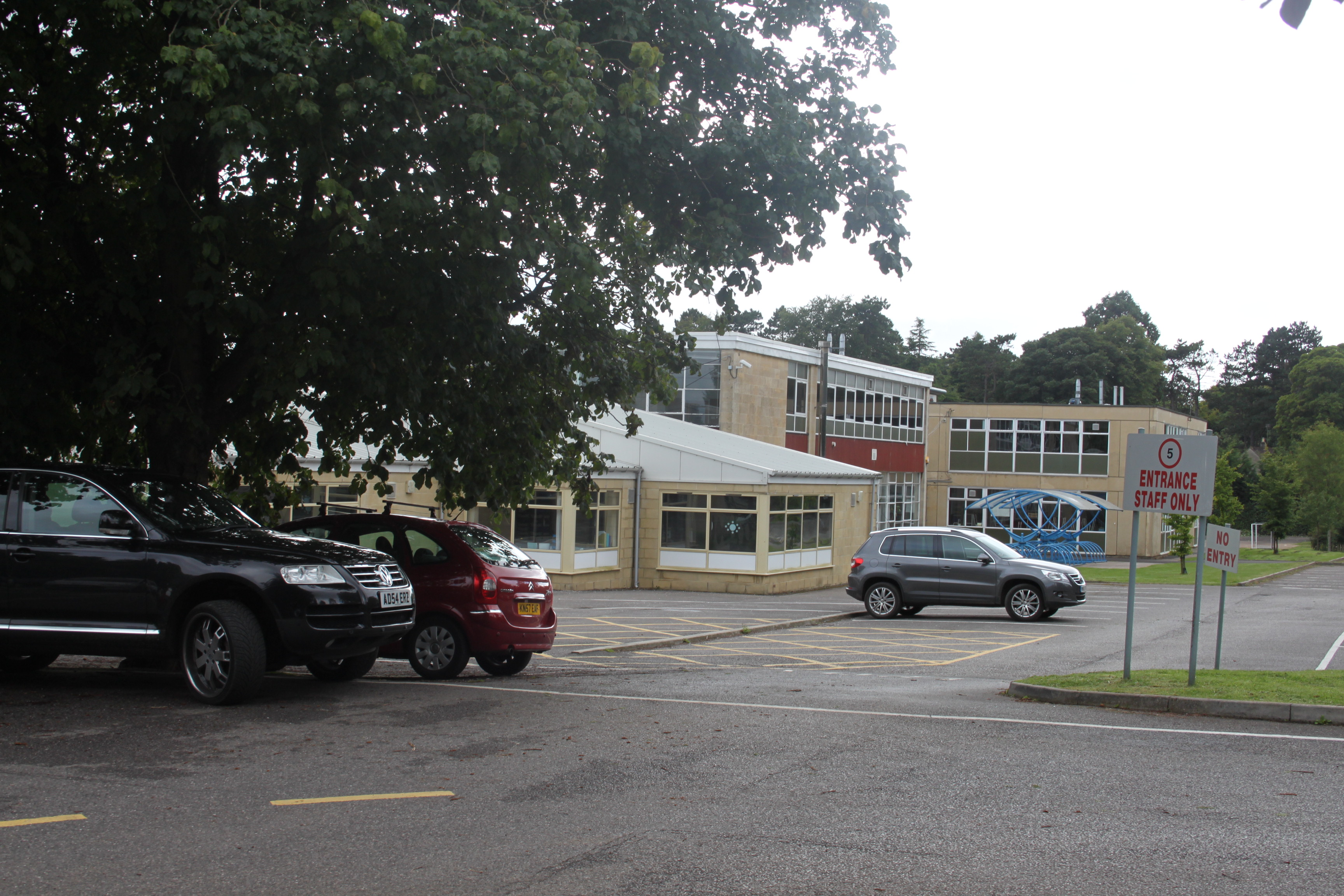

Location
- Claverton Down Road; Bath, Somerset, BA2 7AD; England; 51°21′48″N 2°19′46″W

Information
- Type: Academy
- Motto: Respect, Teamwork, Personal best
- Established: 1958
- Local authority: Bath and North East Somerset
- Specialists: Sportsmark (Gold); Artsmark (Silver)
- Department for Education URN: 138522 Tables
- Ofsted: Reports
- Chair of Governors: Christopher David Mason
- Headteacher: Nathan Jenkins
- Gender: Coeducational
- Age: 11 to 18
- Enrolment: 1300 pupils
- Houses: Hippogriff; Pegasus; Dragon; Phoenix
- Colour
- Website: http://www.ralphallenschool.com/

Ralph Allen School in Combe Down, Bath, England, is a co-educational, comprehensive secondary school with academy status. Located on the south-eastern edge of Bath, the school educates 11 to 18-year-olds from Bath and the surrounding area.

== History ==
The school was built and named in 1957 to commemorate Ralph Allen (1693-1764). It opened in 1958.

== Awards ==
In 2004, the school gained specialist Science College status, and has also been recognised by Artsmark Silver, Investors in People, Investors in Student Careers, Schools for Health, Partnership Promotion School and Sportsmark Gold awards.

== Partnerships ==
The school is part of the Bath Education Trust, working closely with other local schools, colleges, universities and businesses. It also works closely with the James Dyson Foundation, and is part of the Active Transport to Schools project.

== Notable former pupils ==
- Tobie Donovan, actor
- Serena Guthrie, netball player
- Jeremy Guscott, rugby player
- Chris Lawrence, CG Supervisor on 'Gravity'
- Jake Sinclair, football player
- Scott Sinclair, football player
- Danny Wallace, comic writer
