= Bath College =

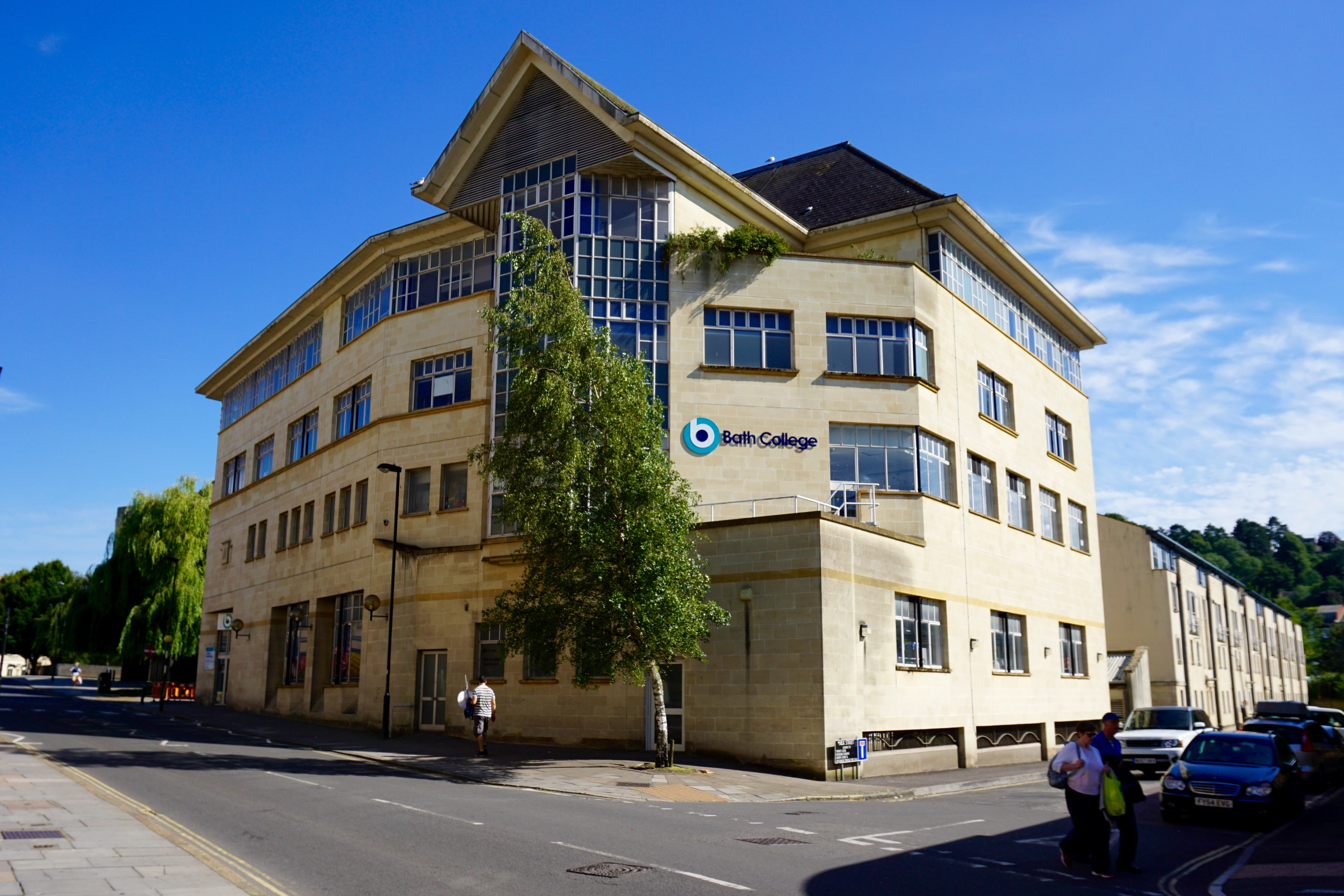
- Allen Building, City Centre campus

Location
- Bath, Somerset, BA1 1UP; England; 51.379722°N 2.3625°W

Information
- Type: Further education college
- Established: 1892; 134 years ago
- Local authority: Bath and North East Somerset
- Department for Education URN: 130558 Tables
- Ofsted: Reports
- Principal & Chief Executive: Kevin Hamblin
- Gender: Mixed
- Age: 16+
- Enrolment: Approx. 9,000
- Website: www.bathcollege.ac.uk

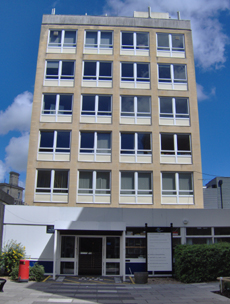
The Macaulay building

Bath College is a further education college in the centre of Bath, Somerset and in Westfield, Somerset, England. It was formed on 7 April 2015 by the merger of City of Bath College and Norton Radstock College. The College also offers Higher Education courses and has its own Undergraduate building.

== History ==
The college was formed in 1892 under the combined names of Bath City Science, Art, and Technical Schools. Its creation arose out of the need to encourage young people to take an interest in the sciences, and for them to be made aware of the technical innovations that were occurring at the end of the 19th century. In April 1896 these new Schools, including Bath Municipal Technical College, occupied the new north extension of the Guildhall, Bath.

In 1910 Long Acre, Walcot was taken over as additional accommodation for technical training, mainly as a domestic science college. In 1914 the Old Jail at Twerton was converted and opened as Twerton Technical Institute. In 1927 a Junior Bath Technical School opened at Bath Technical College and in 1929 a Junior School of Art (Bath School of Art and Design) followed, with the Junior School of Homecrafts being established in 1933. In 1934 the Domestic Science College moved from Long Acre, Walcot to Brougham Hayes, Lower Oldfield Park. This building, built in 1832 as a barracks, housed the Somerset Industrial School for Boys from 1866.

These technical schools evolved into the Bath Technical College, which moved from the North Wing of the Guildhall in 1935 to Lower Borough Walls, taking over the buildings that were vacated when the Royal United Hospital moved to the new hospital in Combe Park.

In 1955 work began on building the current Avon Street campus, which was first opened in 1960, followed by a move into extensions and the main building in 1963. The Kingsmead building, sports hall and theatre were opened in 1973. The Allen Building was opened in spring 1993.

In 2009, City of Bath College had approximately 2,000 full-time and more than 6,000 part-time students.

=== Merger with Norton Radstock College in 2015 ===
In late 2014, the college decided to merge with the Norton Radstock College which had had years of financial problems and poor Ofsted reports.

In March 2015 the merger was confirmed, and, from April 2015, the merged college has been named Bath College. The Bath campus is named Bath College City Centre, and the campus at Westfield near Radstock – about 7 miles (11 km) southwest of Bath – is named Bath College Somer Valley.

== Curriculum ==
The college offers a range of vocational courses covering business and professional courses, computing, IT, media, performing arts, music, catering and hospitality, hairdressing, beauty and complementary therapy, floristry, construction, engineering, carpentry, stonemasonry, sport, travel and tourism, uniformed public services, art and design. In January 2013, Ofsted once again graded the College's Art and Design department as 'outstanding' and the rest of the college was graded as 'good'. Courses are also offered at a range of levels from Entry Level through to Foundation Degrees, HNDs and professional qualifications.

The college has offered the University of Bath's International Foundation Year for over 15 years. This course is a one-year intensive programme for students outside the EU to gain entry into the University of Bath. It offers routes into all undergraduate programmes at the university with the exception of Architecture to gain entry.

== City centre campus ==
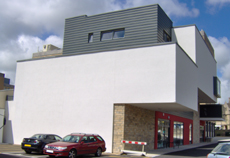
The MAPA block

The College occupies several buildings. The Allen building houses the refectory and the Shrubbery restaurant, a training restaurant for catering students. Macaulay building houses the learning resource centre, the Student Advice Centre, additional learning support departments, the student participation team and the students' union. Herschel building was formerly the sixth form centre, and now houses art, media and the College management team. The Westgate building currently houses Sixth Form classes; the classrooms are also used as exam rooms. The Construction Skills Centre at Bath Trade Park provides carpentry and stonemasonry workshops, plus classrooms and study areas.

MAPA, designed by Bath practice Aaron Evans Architects, was the newest building until recently. It is home to the College's music and performing arts courses and replaces the Gainsborough building. This building is split into three sections: performing arts takes around half of the space with its rehearsal room, performance space and sprung-floor mirrored dance studio. Music is next door with three professional recording studios, performance venue, four rehearsal rooms and film editing facilities. College House is mostly staff offices and the International Office.

In early 2011, Kings building, which used to house the gym, was demolished to make way for a new three-storey building called the Roper Building. This building now houses the main entrance, the hair and beauty training academies and the Higher Education Centre.

== Somer Valley campus ==
The Westfield campus serves the towns and villages of the former Somerset Coalfield, including Camerton, Peasedown St John, Radstock, Kilmersdon, Midsomer Norton and Paulton. The site has a Construction Skills Centre and a Special Educational Needs and Disability (SEND) Centre, Wellow House, for pre-entry students.

== Notable alumni ==
- Emma Pierson, actress (Hotel Babylon, Grange Hill)
- Jason Gardener, athlete (60m / 100m)
- Nathan Catt, Bath Rugby player
- Danny Byrd, Drum and bass DJ and producer
- Gabrielle Aplin, singer-songwriter
- Sophie Anderson, pornographic actress and model

== See also ==
- List of UCAS institutions
- List of universities in the United Kingdom
