= Midsomer Norton railway station =

Former railway station in England

Midsomer Norton
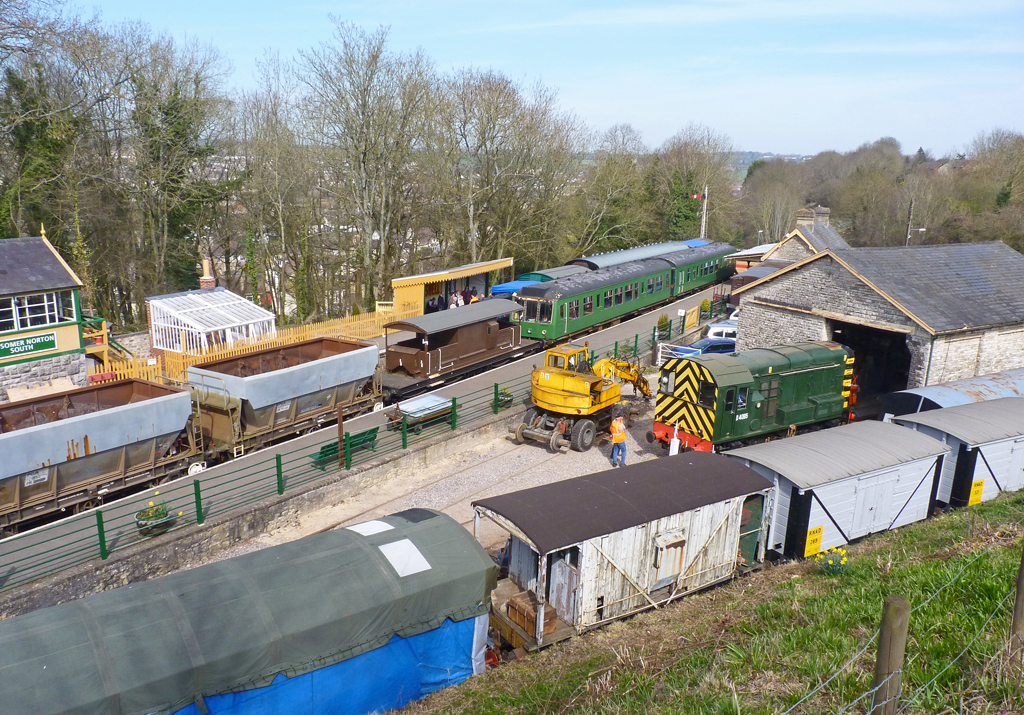
- Midsomer Norton railway station in 2012

General information
- Location: Midsomer Norton, Bath and North East Somerset; England
- Coordinates: 51.2809°N 2.4828°W
- Grid reference: ST664537
- System: Station on heritage railway
- Owner: SR and LMSR; Western Region of British Railways
- Manager: Somerset and Dorset Joint Railway
- Platforms: 2

Key dates
- 20 July 1874: Opened (Midsomer Norton)
- 16 October 1898: Renamed (Midsomer Norton and Welton)
- 26 September 1949: Renamed (Midsomer Norton South)
- 7 March 1966: Closed
- 1995: Leased to Somerset & Dorset Railway Heritage Trust and reopened.
Location

Midsomer Norton railway station (originally Midsomer Norton, later Midsomer Norton and Welton and finally Midsomer Norton South) was a station on the Somerset and Dorset Joint Railway between Bath Green Park and Shepton Mallet. It served the town of Midsomer Norton in the English county of Somerset, which was also served by a second station known as Midsomer Norton and Welton railway station on the Bristol and North Somerset Railway.

The station opened in 1874. In the 1948 nationalisation the Somerset and Dorset Joint Railway became part of the Western Region of British Railways. Along with the rest of the line it closed in 1966. In the early to mid 1990s Norton Radstock College used the station building and goods shed as their art department base prior to relocating to a newly built art department in the college. Following that The Somerset & Dorset Railway Heritage Trust took the lease on the station in 1995 to restore it. They have restored many of the buildings and laid a short section of track. Future plans for further extension of the track have been proposed.

== History ==
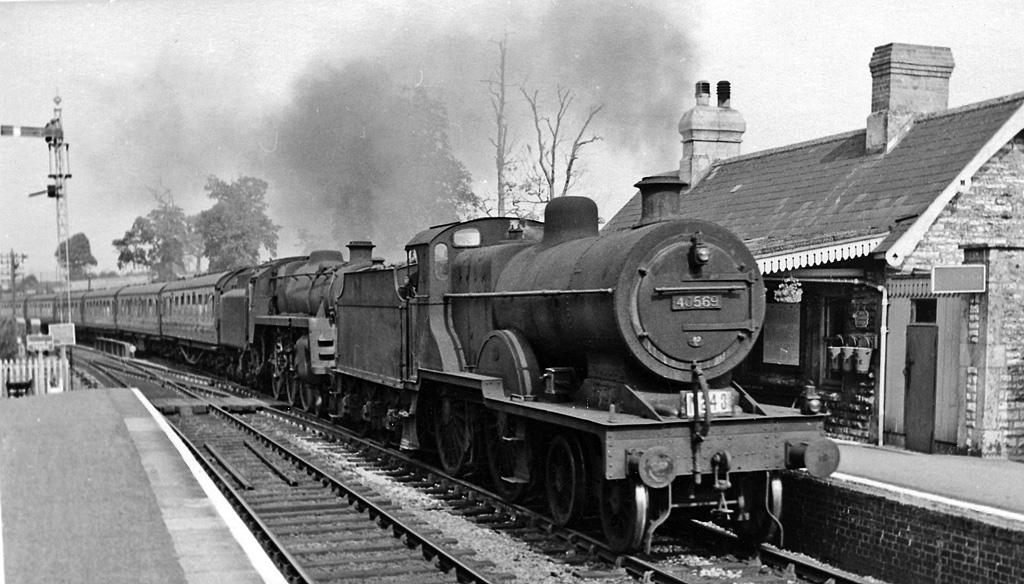
Midsomer Norton South Station in 1959

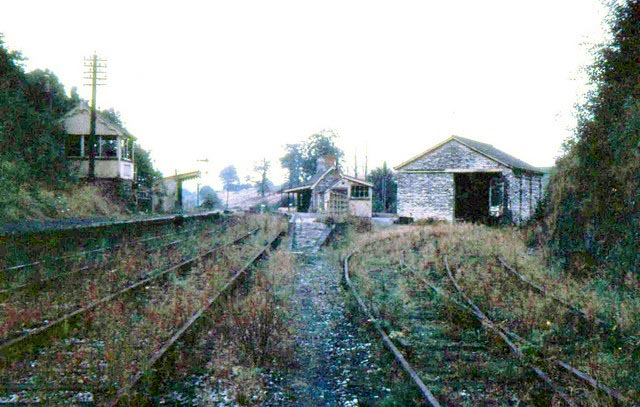
The abandoned station in 1967

The station was part of the Somerset and Dorset Railway's extension from Evercreech Junction railway station to Bath. It opened on 20 July 1874. The Somerset and Dorset Joint Railway was nationalised in 1948 and became part of the Southern Region of British Railways.

The S&DJR station was on a fairly steep slope which took the railway up from the valley floor at Radstock into the Mendip Hills, heading south to the summit of the line at Masbury. It had extensive gardens which were cultivated by the station staff and won many prizes.

The station was mentioned in 1964 in the song "Slow Train" by Flanders and Swann.

It was closed in 1966, with the closure of the Somerset and Dorset Joint Railway, under the Beeching Axe.

== Preservation ==
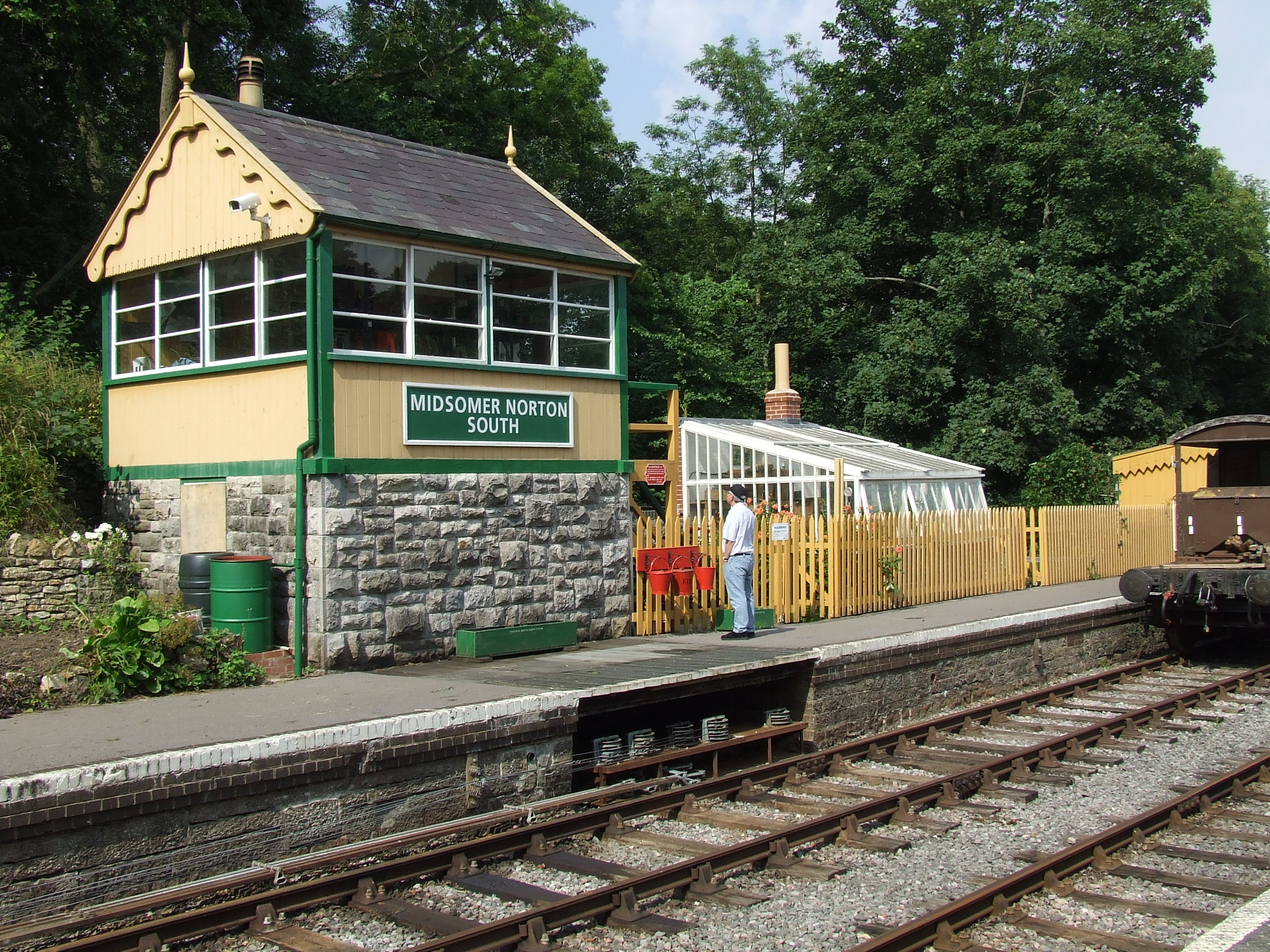
The restored signal box

The station was sold in 1969 to a local school, and then in 1995 to the Wansdyke district council, who leased it to the Somerset and Dorset Railway Heritage Trust to restore to its 1950s condition.

Today the trust runs an operational railway centre and museum at the site, and are relaying the 2 miles 2 chains (3.3 km) of track southwards up the gradient towards Chilcompton. The plan is to eventually operate a ride-round trip over the route, which would require restoration of the former Chilcompton railway tunnel. A road bridge over the railway, north east of the station has been removed, therefore relaying track on this side of the station would be expensive.

Neighbouring land leased to the station restoration project that had been part of the grounds of the now-demolished mansion Norton House has now been transferred to Silver Street Nature Reserve.

In November 2023, Somerset and Dorset Heritage Trust purchased track bed close to where the former railway tunnel linking Chilcompton and Midsomer Norton stations was located. During this time, a track extension was discussed but nothing has since materialised.

== Station summary ==
Preceding station	Disused railways	Following station
Chilcompton; Line and station closed	Somerset & Dorset Joint Railway; LSWR & Midland Railways	Radstock North; Line and station closed
