= Church of St John the Baptist, Chilcompton =

Church in Somerset, England

Church of St John the Baptist
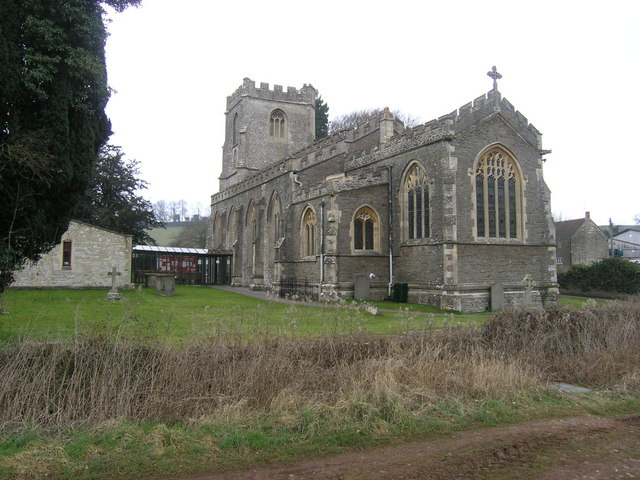

- Location within Somerset
- 51°16′11″N 2°30′27″W
- Location: Chilcompton, Somerset, England

History
- Built: 15th century

Listed Building – Grade II*
- Designated: 21 September 1960
- Reference no.: 1345096

The Anglican Church of St John the Baptist in Chilcompton, within the English county of Somerset, was built in the 15th century. It is a Grade II* listed building.

The earliest church on the site was recorded in 1188 when it was given to Wells Cathedral.

The perpendicular embattled two stage tower dates from around 1460 and contains twelve bells. The nave and aisles were completed in 1839 by Jesse Gane and the chancel and flanking chapels in 1897, as part of a Victorian restoration, by Frederick Bligh Bond. An enclosed modern structure links it to the adjoining parish hall.

In 2015 the church was added to the Heritage at Risk Register because of water and frost damage to the stonework. A grant for the repair of the roof has been made available.

The ecclesiastical parish is now united with that of Saint Vigor at Stratton-on-the-Fosse forming part of the benefice of Chilcompton with Downside and Stratton on the Fosse within the Diocese of Bath and Wells.

== See also ==
- List of ecclesiastical parishes in the Diocese of Bath and Wells
