= Norton House, Somerset =

Mansion in Midsomer Norton, Somerset, England

Coordinates: 51.2814°N 2.4836°W

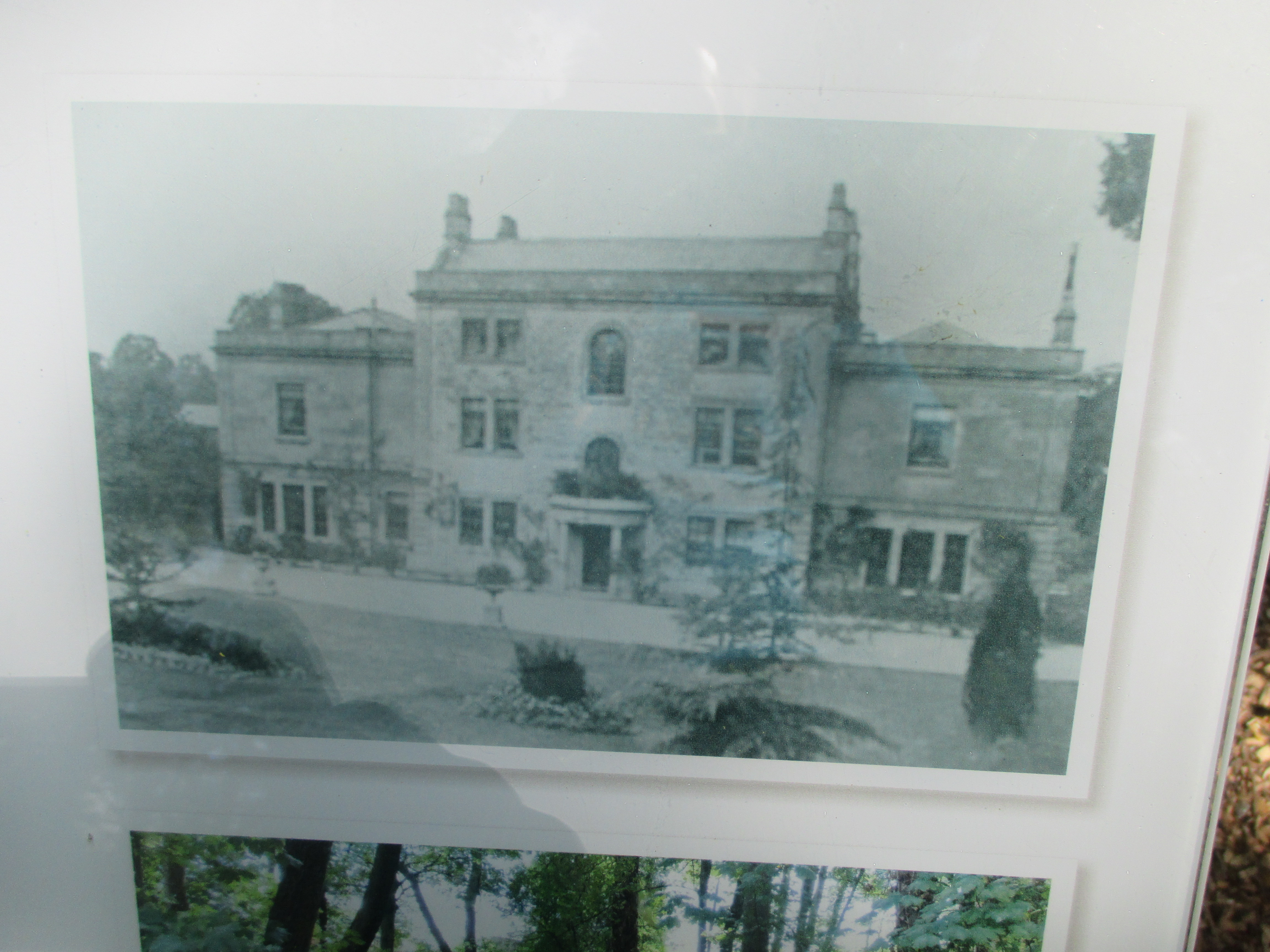
The tourist information sign at Silver Street Nature Reserve, showing a photograph of Norton House

Norton House was a mansion in Midsomer Norton, Somerset. It was built around 1789 by the Savage family, investors in mines in the Somerset Coalfield. It was demolished in 1937-8 to make way for housing but several features from the house and its estate survive to this day.

== Early history ==
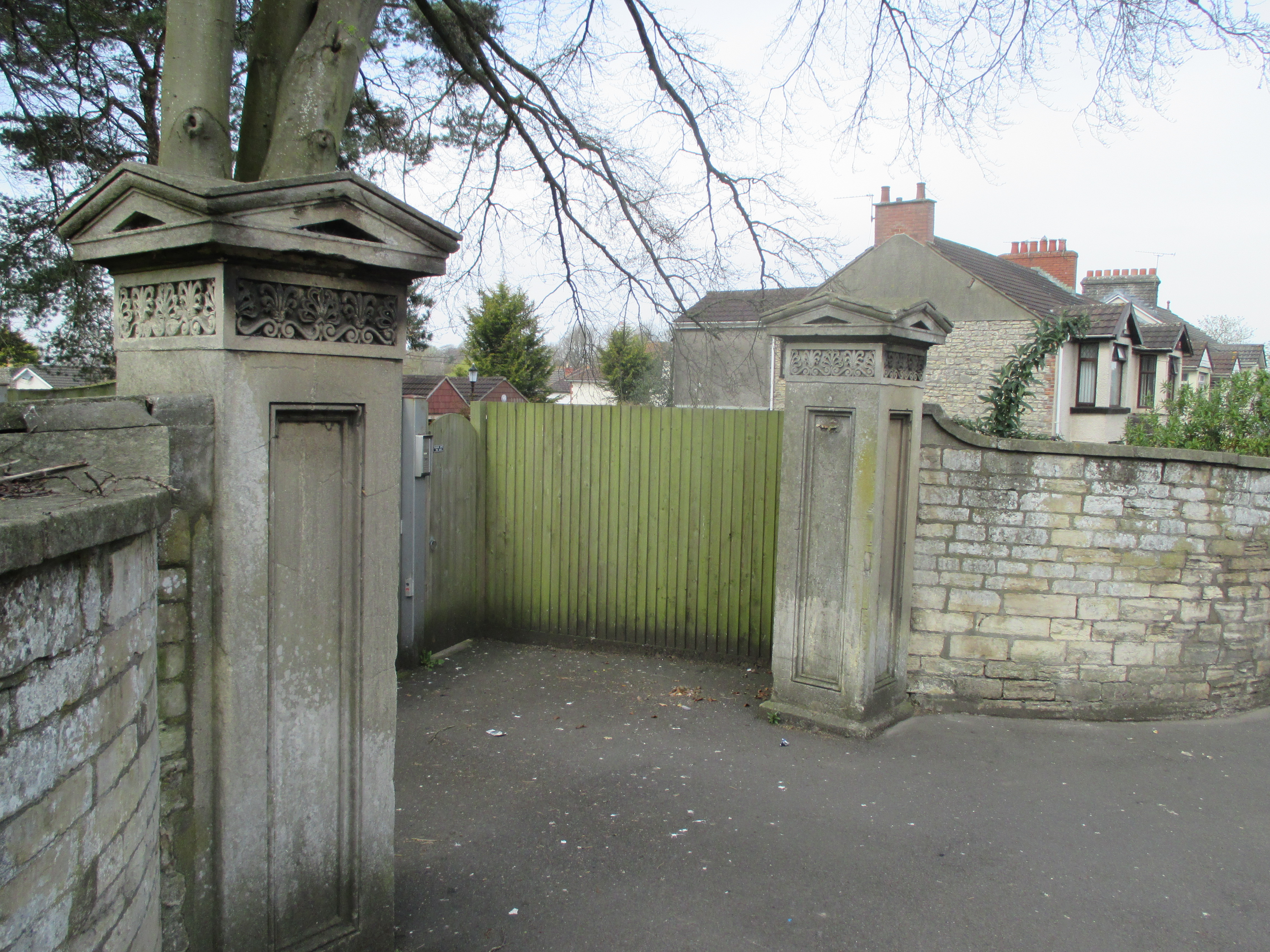
Stone gate columns at former grounds of Norton House, Midsomer Norton.

A Duchy of Cornwall estate map of 1787 shows the grounds of Norton House acquired by Thomas Savage. Records show plans for the house by Thomas Savage being laid out in 1789 on the land, close to the centre of Midsomer Norton. It is likely there was an earlier house on the site. The Savage family were major investors in mines in the Somerset Coalfield. Woods were planted on adjacent sloping land as a landscape feature when Norton House was built.

Thomas Savage arranged for mine sinkers to build a springhead on a hill overlooking the house, so running water could be supplied to the house. In 2013 the springhead was restored using remnants of the original pipes. With the formation of the Midsomer Norton Water Works Company in 1881, the springhead was no longer required. At that point it appears to have been converted to use as an ice house. For this purpose, the oval outline of the brick-built cistern was covered with a stone vault and buried under a mound of earth to provide insulation against the outside air. The ice would have been obtained in winter from the neighbouring shallow artificial pond nearby which appears to have been created especially for this purpose and survives to this day.

The stone gate piers from Norton House survive in Silver Street, Midsomer Norton and have been incorporated into the gateway of a modern house. Along with the cast iron gates themselves (no longer onsite) they were grade II listed in 1979. The gate piers date to the 1830s; the panelled gate piers have a cross-gabled capping above a honeysuckle frieze while the gates had flower designs between the rails. Norton House lay a short distance to the south of the gate.

== Crimean War monument ==
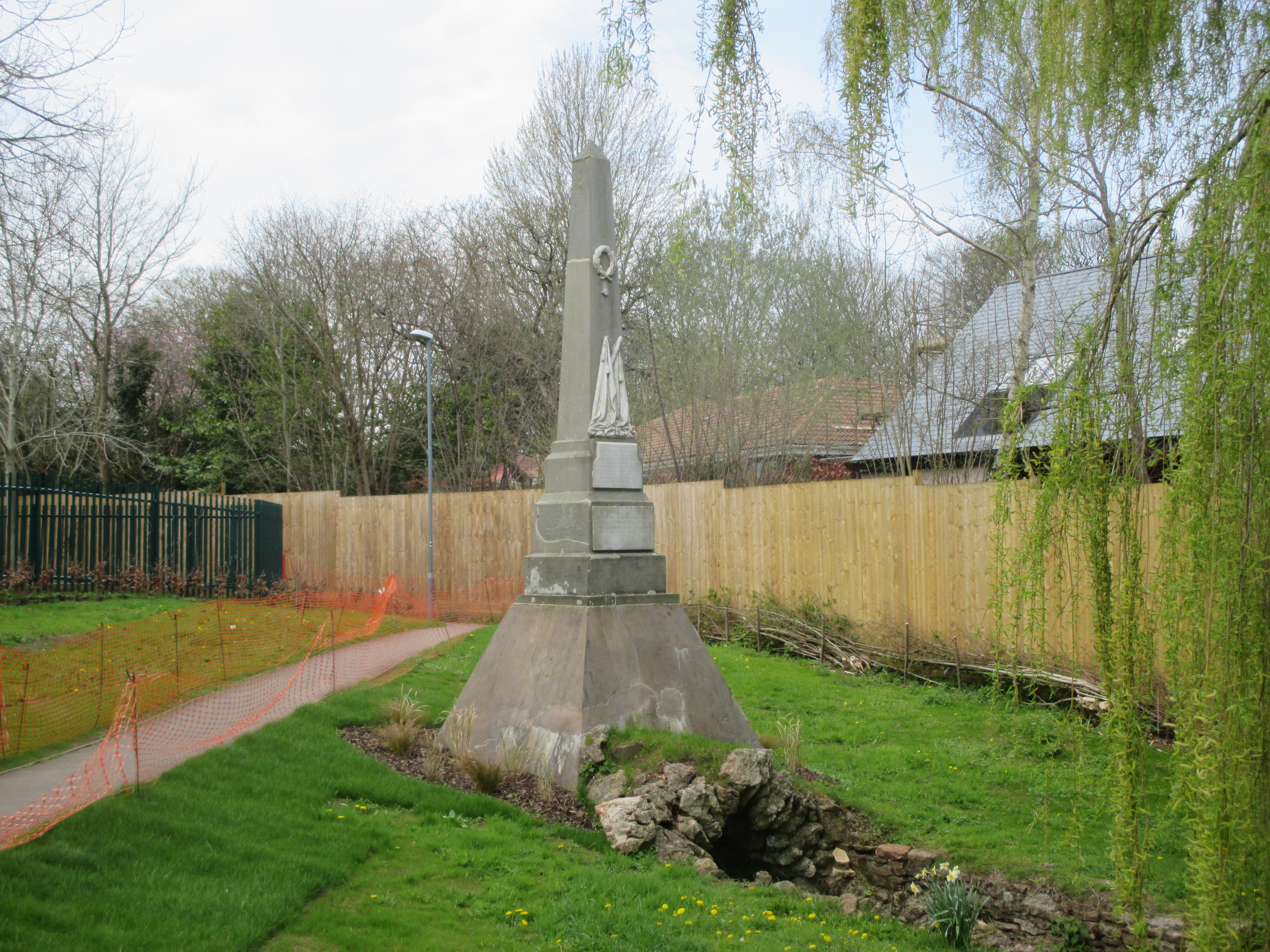
The Crimean War monument in former grounds of Norton House, Midsomer Norton

Around 1866 an obelisk monument with two marble plaques was built at the site of St Chad's Well near the boundary of the grounds, close to Midsomer Norton town centre, by the mother of Major Frederick Stukeley Savage to her son who had been injured in the Crimean War. The decision to place the monument near the spring, which had long been used by the people of the town, resulted from her son's letters home from the war. He highlighted the problems the soldiers had gaining access to clean water, causing them many deaths from waterborne diseases. Although the Major did return from the war, he was an invalid and died ten years later. The writer Arthur Waugh, father of Evelyn, whose father Alexander was the doctor in the town tells how the distraught Mrs Savage visited the memorial daily. "Here, in the evenings, the pathetic, wizened Mrs Savage was conducted in her wheel chair, attended by her faithful henchman, Jonah Shearn. The path to the well was set with shrubs, and if any weed had grown between their stems, the wheel chair was stopped before the offending vegetable, and Jonah, trowel in hand, dug it up and cast it in the stream that babbled by. Then she paused and read the inscription with a far-away look in her eyes. It was her tribute to an only child". (For the full text see ‘One Man’s Road’ p. 73-74) The monument survives to this day, next to the Somer Valley FM radio station in the grounds of Somervale School. Also surviving are elaborate enclosure railings and gate, but an original grotto archway of Chilcompton rough stone has disappeared.

== Later history and demolition ==
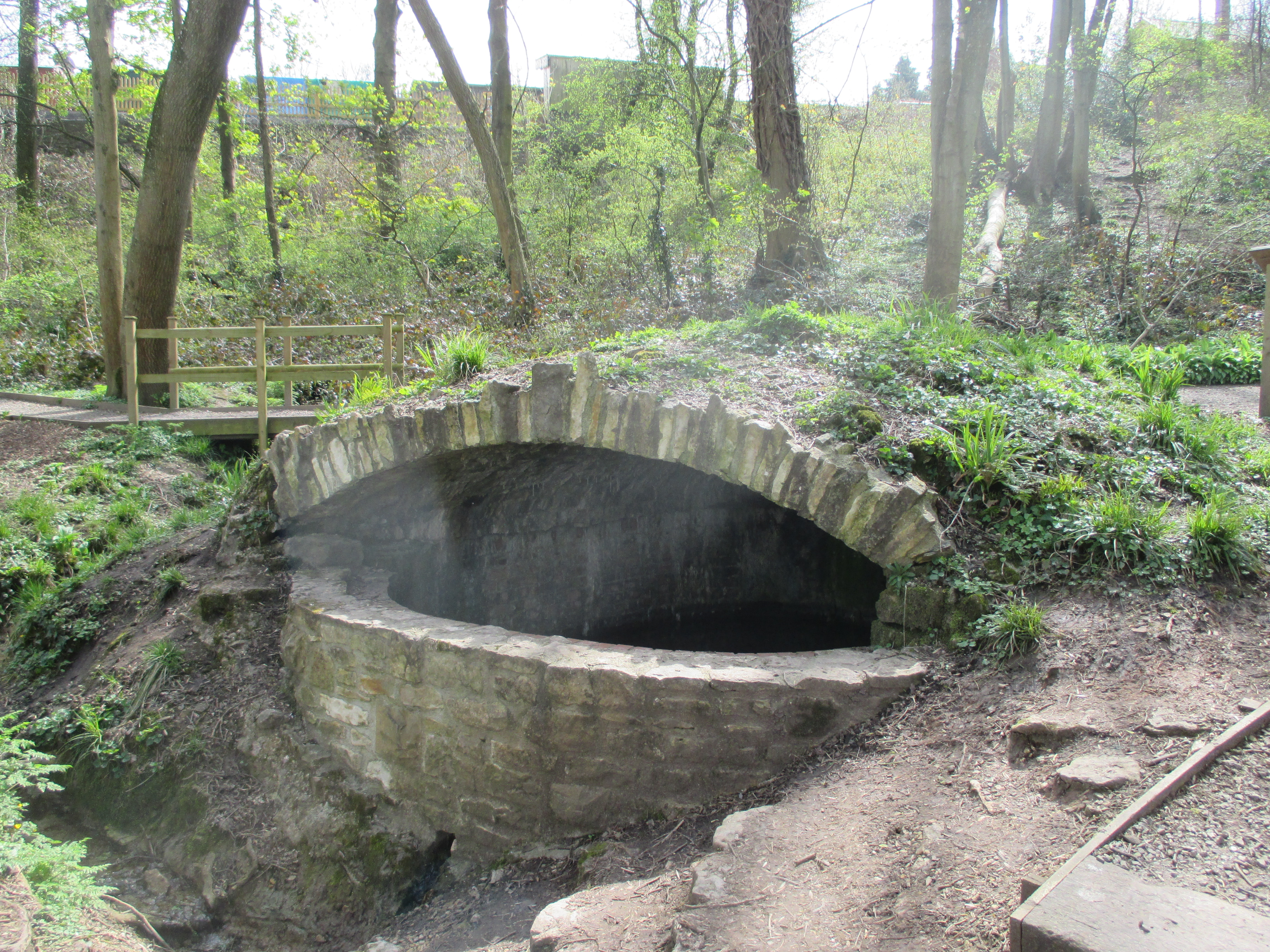
Restored wellhead at Silver Street Nature Reserve, Midsomer Norton, that used to serve Norton House.

In 1874 the house was separated from some of its land when the new Somerset and Dorset Joint Railway connecting Bath and Bournemouth was built across the estate just south of the house. Midsomer Norton railway station Records from 1885-6 also show solicitors' charges for Mrs. Savage (wife of Major Frederick S. Savage) relating to land transactions with the railway company.

When the last of the Savage family died in 1888 the house was sold to Frederick Bird for £3,050 with 27 acres of land attached. When he died in 1904 it was acquired by Gerald Thatcher, the brother of the composer and music administrator Sir Reginald Thatcher and the brother-in-law of coalmine owner Sir Frank Beauchamp, before being sold in 1912 to an individual known as Prince Tschajkowsky, popularly believed to be Russian. He refurbished the house but left within two years with reports of debts and rumours that he was a spy. In World War I the building was used to house Belgian refugees.

Photographs of the house show a typically Georgian mansion in the conventional classical style, with lawns, landscaped gardens and a conservatory.

After WW1 it was used as a school. A proposal was made in 1926 for a "Mentally Defective School" at Norton House. It was demolished in 1937-8 to make way for housing. Most of the grounds are now occupied by the 1930s housing estate Park Way, Somervale School and Silver Street Nature Reserve.

== Silver Street Nature Reserve ==
In the early 21st century part of the house's grounds next to the restored Midsomer Norton railway station was designated as Silver Street Nature Reserve. Visitors can view the restored springhead as well as ponds that formed part of the house's landscaped gardens.
