= Church of St Vigor, Stratton-on-the-Fosse =

Church in Somerset, England

Church of St Vigor
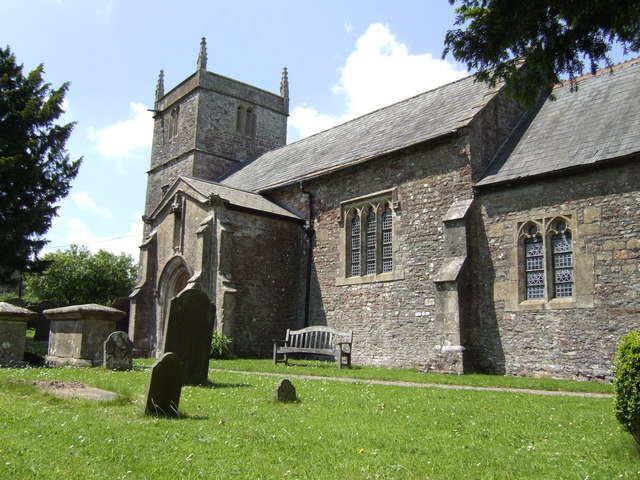

- Location within Somerset

General information
- Location: Stratton-on-the-Fosse, England
- Coordinates: 51.2552°N 2.4896°W
- Completed: 12th century

The Anglican Church of St Vigor in Stratton-on-the-Fosse, Somerset, England, dates from the 12th century and has been designated as a Grade I listed building. Saint Vigor was a French bishop and Christian missionary. After the Norman conquest of England, his cult moved from France to England. This church is one of only two English churches dedicated to him, the other being at Fulbourn in Cambridgeshire.

The original Norman church was founded by Geoffrey de Montbray the Bishop of Coutances after he became the lord of the manor following the Norman Conquest. Only the doorway on the south side of the church, the chancel arch and font remain from this period. The pulpit dates from the 14th century along with the chancel.

The stained glass windows contain fragments dating from medieval times, which were incorporated into the more recent windows after damage which may have occurred during the English Civil War.

The Long chapel, named after the benefactors, the Long family, was built in 1782.

The churchyard contains a war grave of a Somerset Light Infantry soldier of World War II.

St. Vigor's Church forms a joint benefice with St. John's in nearby Chilcompton, and falls within the archdeaconry of Bath.

== See also ==
- List of Grade I listed buildings in Mendip
- List of towers in Somerset
- List of ecclesiastical parishes in the Diocese of Bath and Wells
