= Christ Church, Downside =

Church in Somerset, England

Christ Church
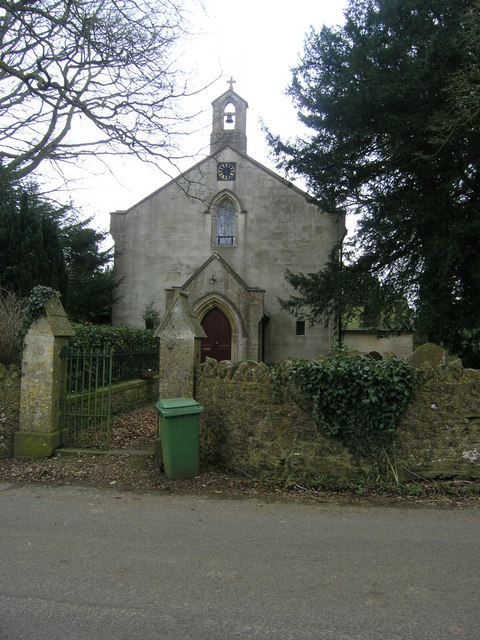

Religion
- Affiliation: Church of England
- Ecclesiastical or organizational status: Closed
- Year consecrated: 1838

Location
- Location: Downside, Somerset, England
- Interactive map of Christ Church
- Coordinates: 51.2514°N 2.5150°W

Architecture
- Architect: John Pinch the younger
- Type: Church

Christ Church is a former Church of England church in Downside, Somerset, England. Designed by John Pinch the younger, it was built in 1837–38 and closed in 1983. The church, now a private residence, is a Grade II listed building.

== History ==
Christ Church was erected as a chapel of ease to St John the Baptist in the parish of Midsomer Norton, at a time when the population of the parish had reached over 3,000. Although the parish church had been rebuilt in 1830–31, its centralised location made it difficult for some inhabitants to attend services. The proposed chapel of ease was intended to serve the inhabitants of Downside, Benter and Clapton, all of whom were two to four miles from the parish church. The Bishop of Bath and Wells donated a plot of land for the new church, and the plans were drawn up by John Pinch.

Construction began in 1937, and the completed church was consecrated by the Bishop of Bath and Wells, the Right Rev. George Henry Law, on 29 November 1838. Downside was made its own ecclesiastical parish on 4 July 1845, which contained Downside, Benter and Nettlebridge, and part of Chilcompton.

Christ Church underwent restoration and reseating in 1897, which included replacing the pews with new ones of pitch pine, laying new flooring and adding new altar steps, choir stalls and a vestry. The work was carried out by Messrs. W. A. Catley and C. Hill of Midsomer Norton to the designs of Mr. W. F. Bird. The work cost £200 and the church reopened on 21 November 1897.

A new organ was gifted to the church by Miss Talbot of Bath and dedicated on 7 June 1899. The churchyard was extended in the same year to provide more burial space. It was consecrated by the Bishop of Bath and Wells, the Right Rev. George Kennion, on 24 June 1899.

Christ Church was declared redundant on 1 July 1983. It was subsequently sold and used as a store from 1985 to 1995. Planning permission was granted in 1995 for the building's conversion into a single dwelling.

== Architecture ==
Christ Church is built of Doulting stone, with a roof of tile and slate. It was designed to accommodate 272 persons and made up of a three-bay nave, chancel and west porch. A bellcote containing a single bell was built on the west end gable. A vestry was added to the church in 1907.
