= Evercreech New railway station =

Former railway station in England

Coordinates: 51.1460°N 2.5091°W

Evercreech New
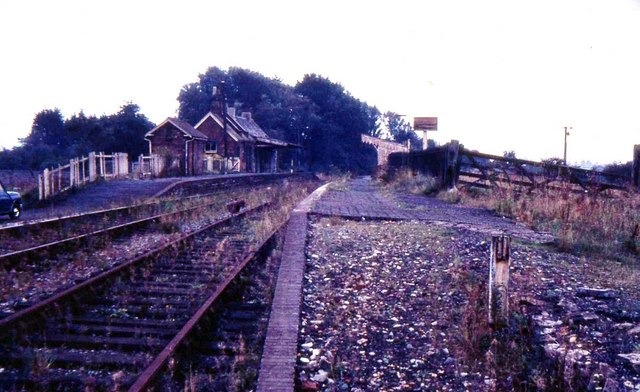
- Evercreech New in 1967

General information
- Location: Evercreech, Somerset; England
- Grid reference: ST645386
- Platforms: 2

Other information
- Status: Disused

History
- Pre-grouping: Somerset and Dorset Joint Railway
- Post-grouping: SR and LMSR; Western Region of British Railways

Key dates
- 20 July 1874: Opened (Evercreech Village)
- September 1874: Renamed (Evercreech New)
- 7 March 1966: Closed
Location

Evercreech New, originally called "Evercreech Village", was a railway station at Evercreech on the Somerset and Dorset Joint Railway.

The station opened in 1874 with the completion of the extension of the S&D from the nearby Evercreech Junction to Bath. It closed in March 1966 when the line was shut as part of the Beeching axe.

Preceding station	Disused railways	Following station
Evercreech Junction; Line and station closed	Somerset & Dorset Joint Railway; LSWR and Midland Railways	Shepton Mallet (Charlton Road); Line and station closed
