= Somerset & Dorset Railway Heritage Trust =

Heritage railway

Coordinates: 51.2809°N 2.4828°W

Somerset & Dorset Joint Heritage Railway Trust
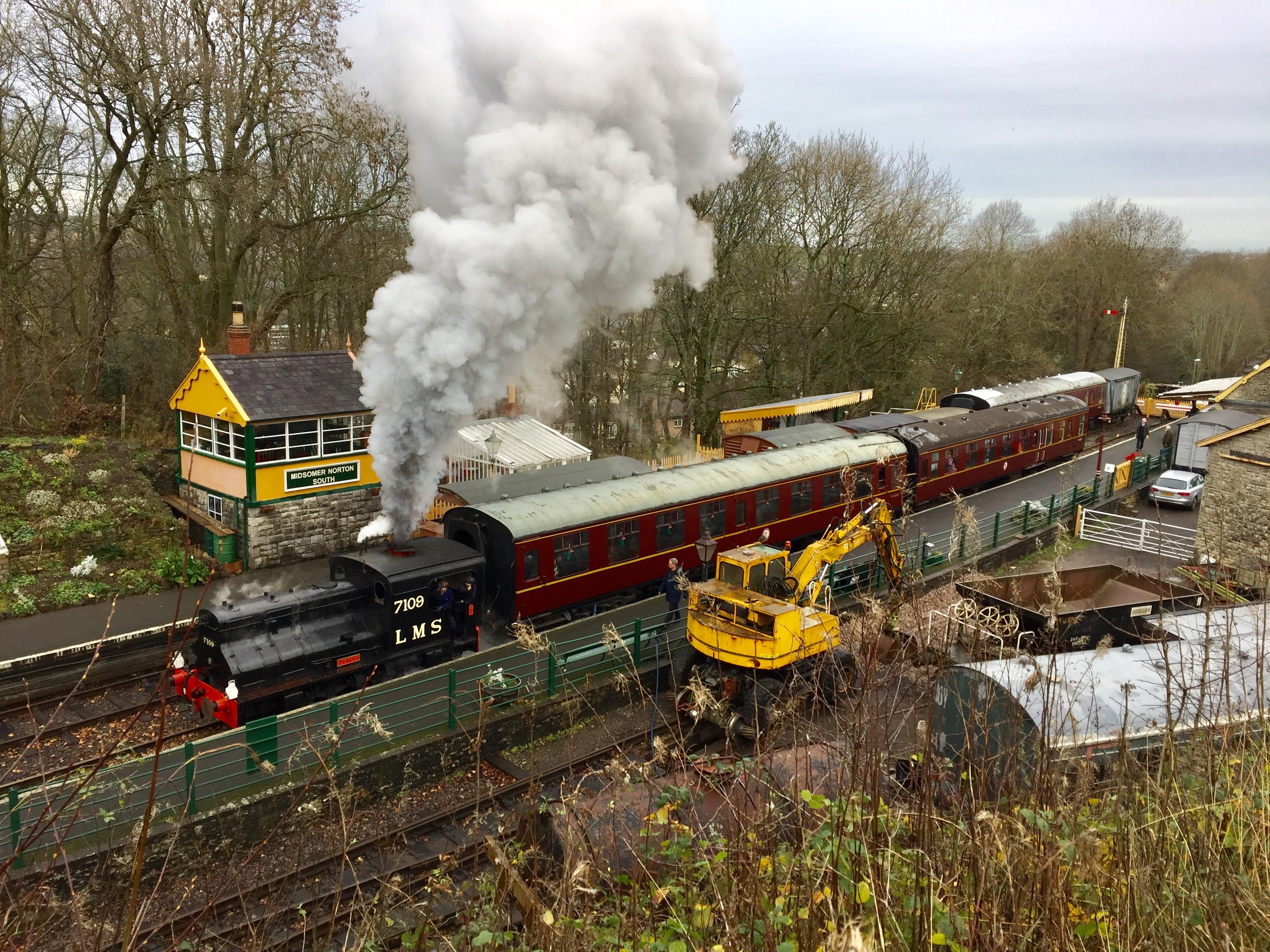
- First Santa service of the day leaves Midsomer Norton South on Sunday 16 December 2018
- Locale: North East Somerset

Commercial operations
- Name: Somerset & Dorset Joint Railway
- Original gauge: 4 ft 8+1/2 in (1,435 mm) standard gauge

Preserved operations
- Stations: Midsomer Norton South
- Length: 1 mile (2 km)

Commercial history
- Opened: 1862
- Closed: 1966

Preservation history
- 1996: Somerset & Dorset Trackbed Trust signed a lease to start restoration of the station building and goods shed.

Website
- https://sdjr.co.uk/

The Somerset & Dorset Railway Heritage Trust (S&DRHT) is a heritage railway line in Somerset, England, that runs on a restored section of the Somerset and Dorset Joint Railway. The line is approximately 1 mile (1.6 km) long and operates from Midsomer Norton South.

== History ==
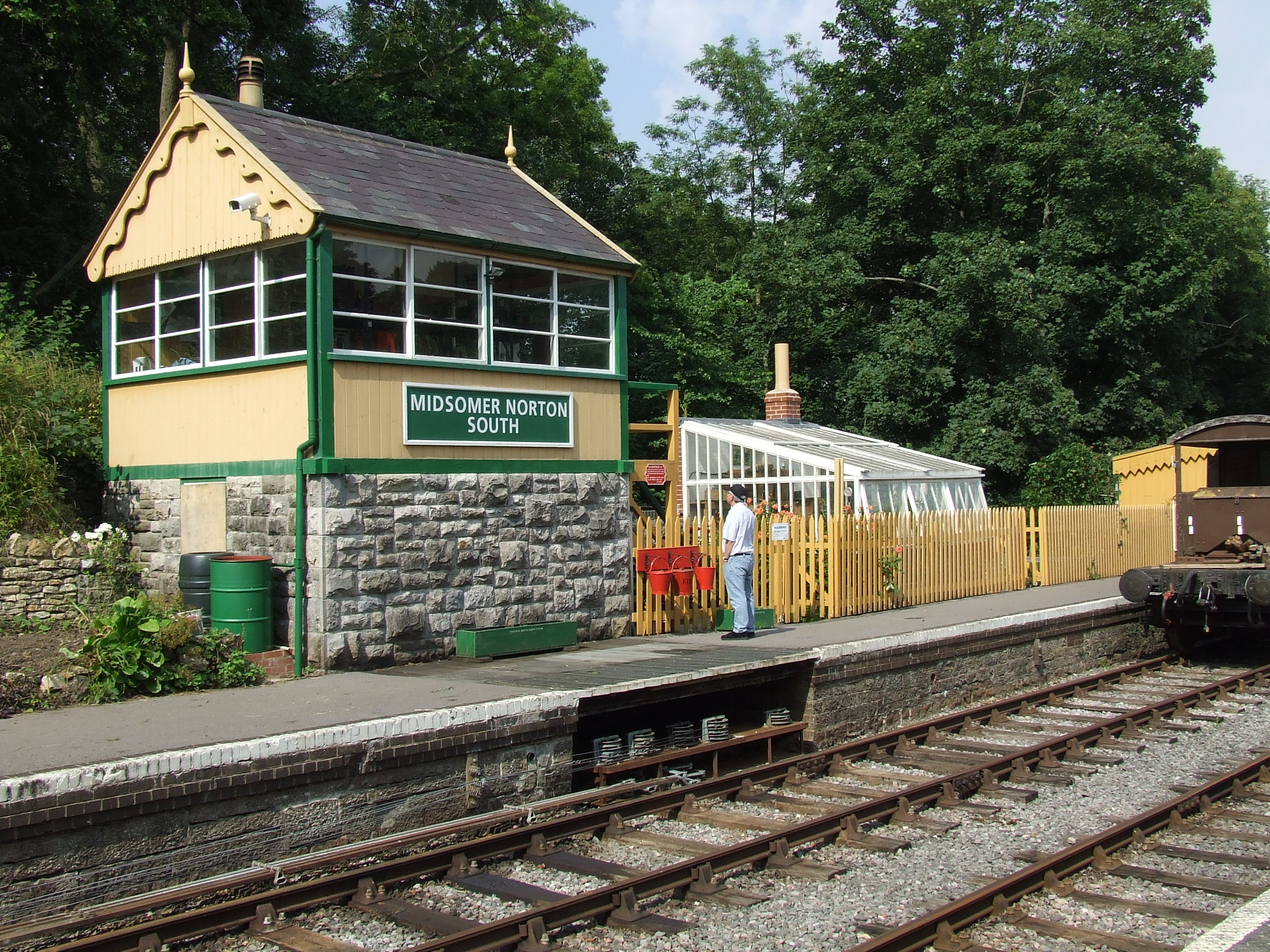
The restored signal box

=== British Railways ownership ===
The Evercreech to Bath section of the S&D, the section which Midsomer Norton South was a part of, opened on 20 July 1874. It was a final attempt by the S&D to achieve profitability by connecting to Bath and crossing the Somerset Coalfield. This failed however, and the railway became jointly owned by the Midland Railway (MR) and the London and South Western Railway (LSWR). At the 1923 Grouping, the line became jointly owned by the London, Midland and Scottish Railway and the Southern Railway, as successors to the MR and LSWR respectively.

After nationalisation in 1948 the line became part of the Southern Region, the era that the trust aims to preserve after. Following the Beeching Report in 1963 it was announced that the line would close and did so on 6 March 1966.

=== Heritage railway ===
The S&D Heritage Trust was formed some 30 years after the closure of the S&DJR in 1966 under the Beeching Axe, headquartered in Midsomer Norton. The station site was sold in 1969 to a local school, and then in 1995 to the Wansdyke district council, who leased it to the Trust to restore to its 1950s condition.

The Trust has since restored the original station buildings, a signalbox and a goods shed. A museum is located in an old horse stable block that houses a collection of S&DJR memorabilia, and there is also a pillbox with World War II exhibits. Having agreed a lease arrangement with the trackbed owners, the Trust has over time relaid the track which now runs for 1 mile from the station up the ruling 1:50 gradient to the infilled cutting towards Chilcompton. The railway bridge over Silver St has been removed, and further extension Southwards will require removal of the in-fill and restoration of the former Chilcompton railway tunnel.

Commercial activities such as catering, retail services and the operation of public trains over the original trackbed come under the control of the Somerset & Dorset Joint Railway Company Ltd., a wholly owned subsidiary of the Trust. It is separate to and should not be confused with the Somerset and Dorset Railway Trust, which was formerly located at the West Somerset Railway's Washford railway station.

In May 2013 an online appeal was launched to raise £500,000 by 30 September 2013 to purchase the station at the summit of the S&DJR at Masbury. The Trust eventually raised only £80,000 by the deadline, and the site was sold to another party.

== Operations ==
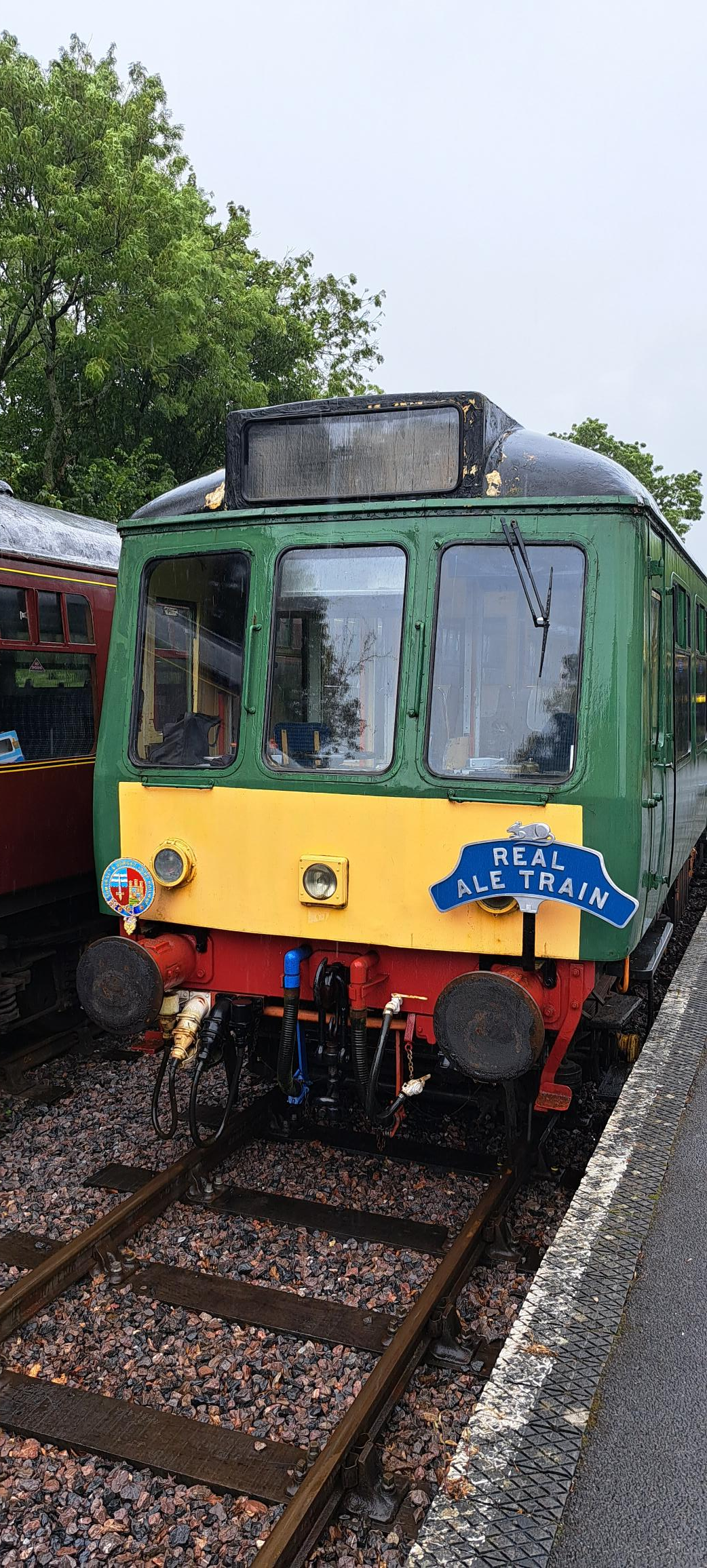
Class 107 being used as part of a Real Ale Train on 22 July 2023

The line has a variety of rolling stock that can be used to provide an arrange of events and running days for the public. On a typical running day, the railway runs a three coach train with steam at one end and diesel at the other. Some events that the railway has done over the past few years include:

- Visits from local schools or private events such as societies or tourists.
- Santa and Easter specials.
- Pines Express remembered gala, this typically takes place in September to mark the anniversary of the last Pines Express.
- Real Ale Trains

== Rolling stock ==
=== Steam Locomotives ===
Number & Name	Locomotive	Current Status	Notes	Livery	Photograph
No. 7109 'Joyce'	Sentinel 0-4-0VBT	Under repair.	Similar to the S&DJR Sentinels used on the line at Radstock North and built at the Sentinel Waggon Works, but neither survived into preservation. 7109 differs to these locomotives, however, with the S&D Sentinels featuring a lower cab roof, oval buffers and square windows. Boiler ticket expires 2026 (privately owned).	BR black.	
No. 92207 'Morning Star'	BR Standard Class 9F 2-10-0	Under restoration.	In 2022, the S&DRHT announced that they had agreed to purchase 92207 for £150,000. It is estimated that the restoration will cost over £500,000 and will likely be complete in the 2030s.	N/A	

=== Diesel Locomotives ===
Number & Name	Photograph	Current Status	Notes	Livery
English Electric 0-6-0DH D1120 David.J.Cook		In service.	Built by the English Electric Company in 1966 at their Vulcan Works Newton le Willows. Originally in service with the National Coal Board at Lea Hall Colliery in Staffordshire, it was acquired by the Somerset & Dorset Locomotive Company for preservation before being purchased by the S&DRHT in 2003. Currently it is being fitted with a vacuum brake system to enable it to work passenger trains.	Green
British Railways Class 08 0-6-0DE D4095		Under maintenance.	Built Horwich Works 1961. TOPS number 08881.	BR green, Wasp stripes

=== Diesel Multiple Units ===
Number & Name	Photograph	Current Status	Notes	livery
Class 107 DMU DMCL/DMBS 52025/52006		In service	Purchased in April 2022 from the Avon Valley Railway, privately owned.	BR green, small warning panel

=== Previous visitors ===
Number & Name	Locomotive	History & Current Status	Livery	Owner	Photograph
No. 80072	British Railways 4MT 2-6-4T	Visited from the Llangollen Railway September 2016 numbered as 80043 for the duration of the visit as this was the number of a classmate that had worked on the Somerset & Dorset line in the 60s.	BR lined black	~	
No. 47406	LMS Class 3F 'Jinty' 0-6-0T		BR lined black	~	
No.41312	LMS Ivatt Class 2 2-6-2T	Visited from the Mid-Hants Railway in September 2022 as part of their Ivatt weekend gala (Remembering the Pines gala part 2).	BR lined black	~	
No. 5459 Austin 1	Kitson and Company 0-6-0ST	Returned to steam after overhaul in March 2020. loaned from 2021 to 2022	Lined Green.	Llangollen Railway Trust	

=== Coaching stock ===
British Rail Mark 1 coaches were the principal passenger stock of the Somerset and Dorset Joint Railway from 1951 until the closure of the railway on 6 March 1966. The railway currently has five of these vehicles, four of which are in service.

Number & Name	Description	Livery	History & Current Status	Owner(s)	Photograph
No. M34527	Mk1 BSK	BR lined maroon.	Operational. Built by BR Wolverton in 1955. In 1978 it was withdrawn and converted for use in Tinsley Depot's breakdown train. In 1998 it entered preservation and in 2004 was acquired by the S&DRHT.	Somerset & Dorset Railway Heritage Trust	~
No. M26049	Mk1 SK	BR lined maroon.	Operational. Built by BR Derby in 1962. Withdrawn in 1983, being sold to a charter company before being sold to Peak Rail and later the Midland Railway. It was then acquired in 2005 by members of the trust before the trust took full ownership in 2021.	Somerset & Dorset Railway Heritage Trust	~
No. W9267	Mk1 BSO	BR lined maroon.	Operational - is mainline certified. Built by BR Doncaster in 1956. It was acquired by the NYMR railway in 1973, with the trust acquiring it on loan in 2017. This particular coach is historically significant, as it was a part of the last excursion train that ran to Bath Green Park on the S&D the day it closed.	North Yorkshire Moors Railway	~
No. S1885	Mk1 RMB	BR lined maroon.	Operational. Built by BR York in 1953 as a TSO (Tourist Standard Open). It was acquired in 1987 by the Swanage Railway, who converted it to an RMB (Restaurant Miniature Buffet) before the trust acquired it in 2019. Is in use as a buffet car serving light refreshments.	Somerset & Dorset Railway Heritage Trust	~
No. M25572	Mk1 SK	BR lined maroon.	Under restoration. Built by BR Wolverton in 1958. It was acquired in 1983 by the Bodmin and Wenford Railway before being sold to a private individual in 2016. The trust acquired it in 2020.	Somerset & Dorset Railway Heritage Trust	~

=== Wagon stock ===
Number & Name	Description	History & Current Status	Livery	Owner(s)	Date	Photograph	Notes
No. S1162S	SR PMVY	Operational.	SR green	Private Owner	1936		
No. M94438	BR CCT	Static, used as book shop.	BR maroon.	Private Owner	1960	~	
No. DW17639	GWR Mess van.	Operational, used as P-Way mess van.	GWR brown.	S&DRHT	1904	~	
No. M44000	Milk Tanker	Static, used to store water for steam operations.	United Daries	S&DRHT	1927		
No. DS56286	SR Queen Mary brake van	Operational.	SR brown	Private Owner	1936	~	
No. DS62070	SR Walrus	Under restoration.	N/A	S&DRHT	1958	~	
No. B192437	SNCF Mineral Wagon	Operational.	BR grey	S&DRHT	1946		
No. B160073	BR 16T Mineral Wagon	Under restoration.	BR grey	S&DRHT	1958		
No. B577004	BR 16T Mineral Wagon	Under restoration.	BR grey	S&DRHT	1957		
No. B558643	BR 16T Mineral Wagon	Under restoration.	N/A	S&DRHT	Unknown.	~	
No. B779696	BR Pal Van	Operational.	BR brown	S&DRHT	1958	~	
No. B756069	BR Box Van	Operational.	BR brown	S&DRHT	1951		
No. B785169	BR Box Van	Operational.	BR brown	S&DRHT	1961	~	
No. M294176	LMS brake van.	Operational.	LMS brown.	S&DRHT	1929	~	
No. DB983233	BR Dogfish	Operational.	BR black	S&DRHT	1959		
No. DB992897	BR Dogfish	Operational.	BR black	S&DRHT	1956		
No. DB984905	BR Grampus	Under restoration.	N/A	S&DRHT	Unknown.	~	
No. DB985126	BR Grampus	Under restoration.	N/A	S&DRHT	1953	~	
No. DB994445	BR Sturgeon	Operational.	BR black	S&DRHT	1959		
No. S49208	SR Elliptical Van	Under restoration.	N/A	S&DRHT	Unknown.	~	
No. 321	Ammunition Van	Under restoration.	RNAD Grey	S&DRHT	1910.		

=== Other stock ===
Number & Name	Description	History & Current Status	Livery	Owner(s)	Date	Photograph
N/A	Road rail vehicle.	Operational.	BR black	S&DRHT	Unknown.	~
B40W	Wickham trolley, Type 27A MkIII.	Wickham 7504, first used in Oxfordshire and then N. Wales until sent to a Nuneaton scrapyard. Carcase found cannibalised in Swanage (original engine removed to restore Wickham 7505). Restored in 2019 to run with a Reliant Robin 850 engine and other car parts. Operational.	BR maroon	S&DRHT	1954	

=== Former rolling and coach stock ===
Number & Name	Description	History & Current Status	Livery	Owner(s)	Date	Photograph
No. 255		Under restoration (body only), on modified underframe of a LMS CCT. Was later sold to the Brecon and Merthyr Railway, one of only three surviving vehicles, in 1920 then withdrawn by GWR c. 1930. The underframe of the LMS CCT was later found to be that of a Midland Railway 6-wheeler, making it more perfect for the fitting. Might be painted in an S&DJR livery as the coach is the appropriate type as used on the line.	N/A	Unknown.	1890	~
No. 10023	Mk3a RFB	Was static in use as buffet car, later sold on to a private owner for non-railway use.	Plain green	Private owner.	1980	~
No. M59664	Class 115 DMU TCL	Static, was in use as staff canteen.	BR line green	Unknown.	1960.	

== See also ==
- Somerset and Dorset Railway Trust
- New Somerset and Dorset Railway
