= Shepton Mallet (Charlton Road) railway station =

Disused railway station in England

Coordinates: 51.1856°N 2.5328°W

Shepton Mallet (Charlton Road)
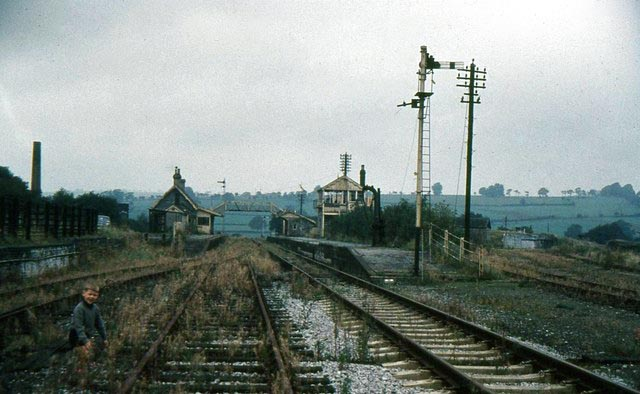

General information
- Location: Shepton Mallet, Somerset; England
- Grid reference: ST629430
- Platforms: 2

Other information
- Status: Disused

History
- Pre-grouping: Somerset and Dorset Joint Railway
- Post-grouping: SR and LMSR; Western Region of British Railways

Key dates
- 20 July 1874: Opened (Shepton Mallet)
- October 1883: Renamed (Shepton Mallet Charlton Road)
- 7 March 1966: Closed
Location

Shepton Mallet (Charlton Road) was a station on the Somerset and Dorset Joint Railway in the county of Somerset in England. Opened as Shepton Mallet on 20 July 1874, it was renamed to avoid confusion with the nearby GWR station in 1883. The station consisted of two platforms with the station building on the up side. There was also a goods yard and cattle dock controlled from a signal box.

The station closed to goods in 1963: passenger services were withdrawn when the SDJR closed in 1966.

Preceding station	Disused railways	Following station
Evercreech New; Line and station closed	Somerset & Dorset Joint Railway; LSWR and Midland Railways	Masbury; Line and station closed
