= Masbury railway station =

Former railway station in England

Coordinates: 51.2229°N 2.5685°W

Masbury
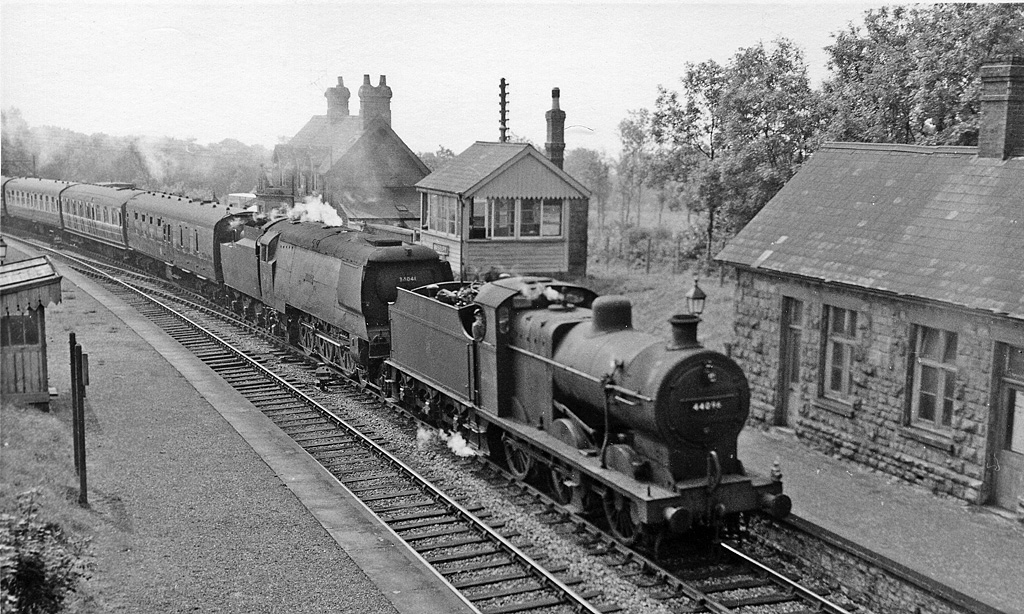
- Masbury Station, with Up express in 1959

General information
- Location: nr Shepton Mallet, Somerset; England
- Grid reference: ST604473
- Platforms: 2

Other information
- Status: Disused

History
- Pre-grouping: Somerset and Dorset Joint Railway
- Post-grouping: SR and LMSR; Western Region of British Railways

Key dates
- 20 July 1874: Opened (Masbury)
- 26 September 1938: Renamed (Masbury Halt)
- 7 March 1966: Closed
Location

Masbury railway station was a small isolated station on the Somerset and Dorset Joint Railway's main line between Evercreech Junction and Bath. It was situated to the north of Shepton Mallet and near the summit of the line as it crossed the Mendip Hills. The station opened in 1874 and closed with the rest of the line under the Beeching Axe in March 1966.

Maesbury Railway Cutting is a two hectare geological Site of Special Scientific Interest between East Horrington and Gurney Slade and a Geological Conservation Review site because it exposes approximately 135 metres of strata representing the middle and upper Lower Limestone Shales and the basal Black Rock Limestone. Both formations are of early Carboniferous (Courceyan) age. It lies close to the Iron Age hill fort Maesbury Castle.

The station was never heavily used, and from 1938 it was reduced to a "halt" status. A feature of the station was a substantial stone-built stationmaster's house on the main northbound platform. The front of the house, which is still standing and in private hands, features a fanciful carving of Maesbury Castle as a medieval castle: in fact, Maesbury is an Iron Age fort nearby. There is about a half-mile of ramparts and views to Glastonbury Tor. The station is located mostly on private land but a public footpath crosses it.

In May 2013 an online appeal was launched by the Somerset & Dorset Railway Heritage Trust to raise £500,000 by 30 September 2013 to purchase the station. The trust eventually raised only £80,000 by the deadline, and the site was sold to another party. The site is now in private hands so visitors are asked to respect the fact that it is a family home. Plans are in progress to restore the station to its original state, including rebuilding the signal box and renovating the platforms and waiting rooms.

Preceding station	Disused railways	Following station
Shepton Mallet (Charlton Road); Line and station closed	Somerset & Dorset Joint Railway; LSWR and Midland Railways	Binegar; Line and station closed
