= Shepton Mallet (High Street) railway station =

Former railway station in England

Coordinates: 51.1866°N 2.5488°W

Shepton Mallet (High Street)
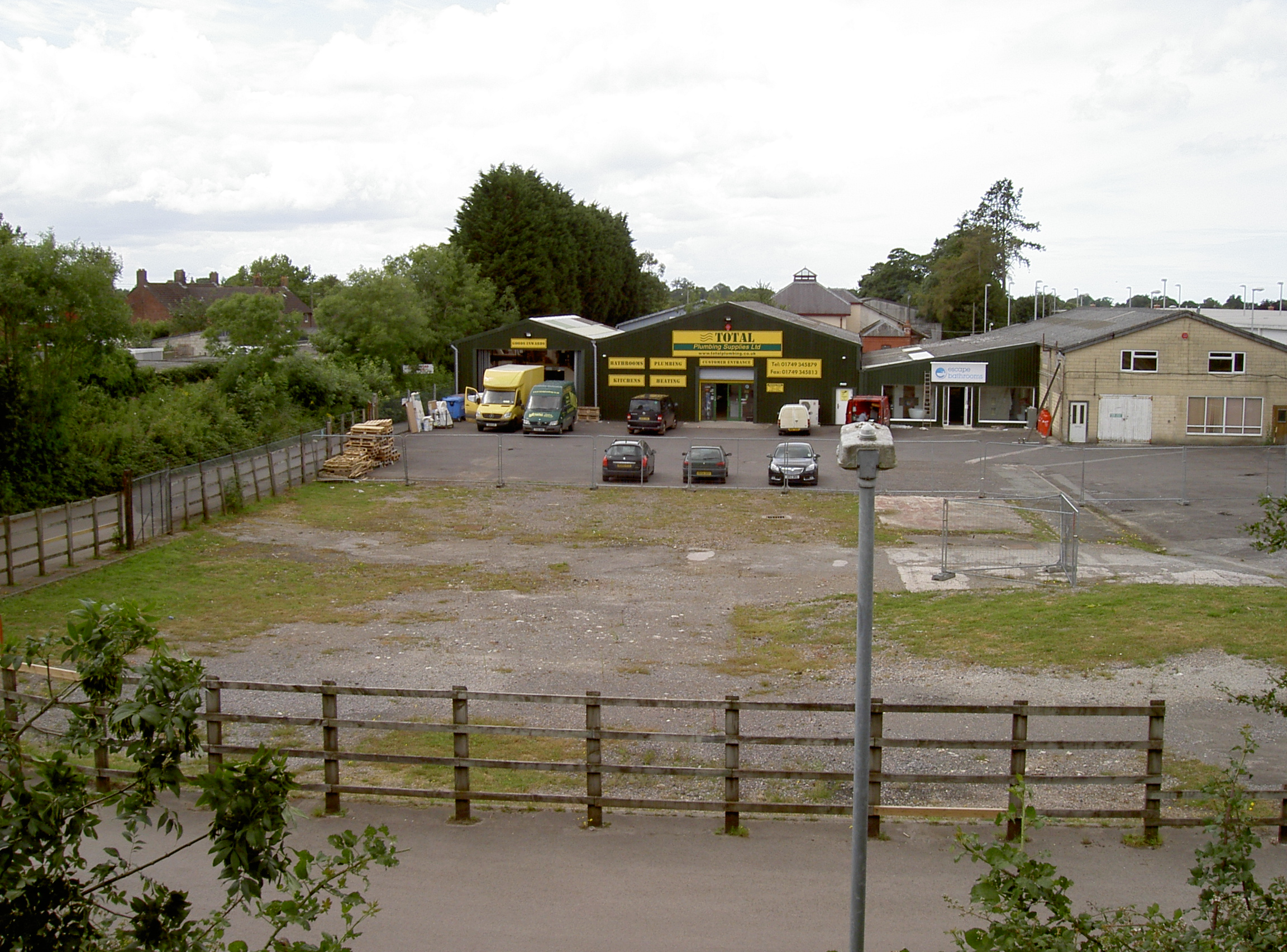
- The site of the station in 2012

General information
- Location: Shepton Mallet, Somerset; England
- Grid reference: ST617431
- Platforms: 2

Other information
- Status: Disused

History
- Pre-grouping: East Somerset Railway; GWR
- Post-grouping: GWR; Western Region of British Railways

Key dates
- 9 November 1858: Opened as "Shepton Mallet"
- 26 September 1949: Renamed "Shepton Mallet (High Street)"
- 9 September 1963: Closed to passenger traffic
- 1969: Closed to goods traffic
Location

Shepton Mallet (High Street) was a railway station on the East Somerset Railway, serving the town of Shepton Mallet in the English county of Somerset.

The station opened in 1858 as the interim western terminus of the line from the Wilts, Somerset and Weymouth Railway at Witham (Somerset). In 1862, the East Somerset line was extended westwards to Wells and in 1878 a junction was made in Wells with the Cheddar Valley Railway that enabled through running between Witham and Yatton. By this time the line had been taken over entirely by the Great Western Railway.

For most of its life, the station was known simply as "Shepton Mallet", the larger title coming into use in 1949 to differentiate the station in the British Railways era from the town's other station on the unconnected Somerset and Dorset Joint Railway. The S&DJR station, less conveniently situated for the town centre, had been known as Shepton Mallet (Charlton Road) since 1883.

Due to the reviews of the Beeching Axe, the station closed to passenger traffic with the withdrawal of services between Yatton and Witham on 9 September 1963. Goods traffic ceased within a year, though goods trains continued to pass through until 1969 with stone from a nearby quarry.

The station building survived as a depot for a cleaning company for some years. After it was decided to clear the site for redevelopment, the station building was dismantled in 2008 for use by the East Somerset Railway for a planned new station at Shepton Mallet.
