= Chilcompton railway station =

Former railway station in England

Coordinates: 51.26065°N 2.51014°W

Chilcompton
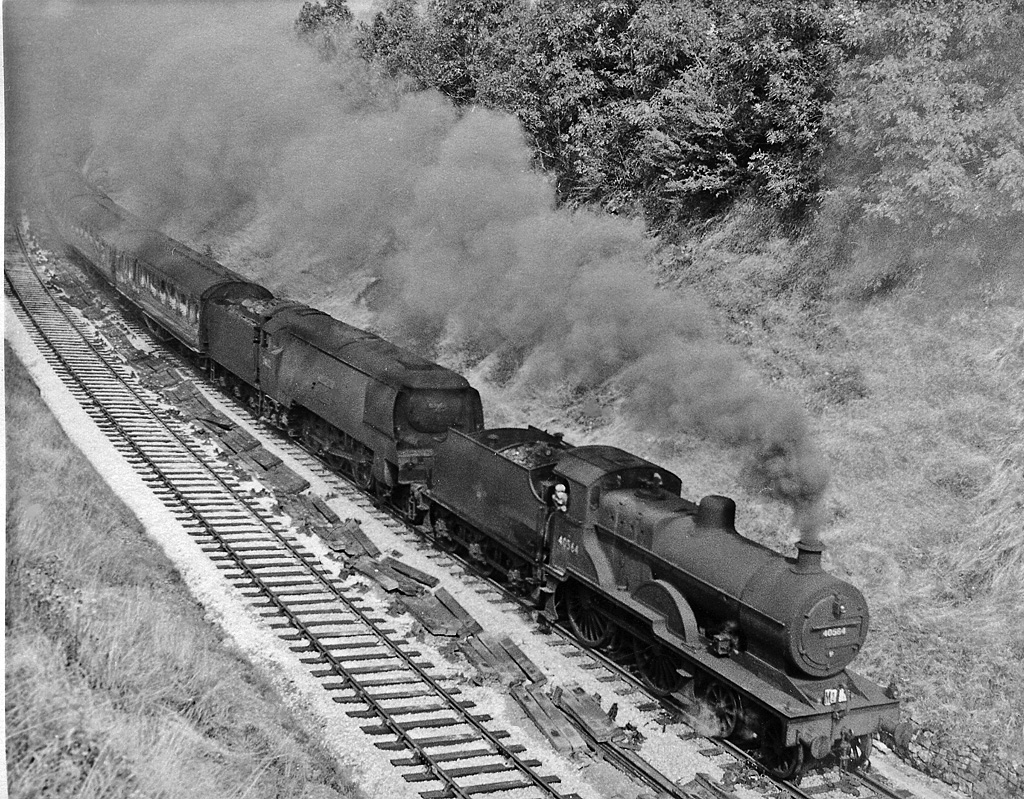
- Down S&D express approaching Chilcompton in 1959

General information
- Location: Chilcompton, Somerset; England
- Grid reference: ST645514
- Platforms: 2

Other information
- Status: Disused

History
- Pre-grouping: Somerset and Dorset Joint Railway
- Post-grouping: SR and LMSR; Western Region of British Railways

Key dates
- 20 July 1874: Opened
- 7 March 1966: Closed
Location

Chilcompton railway station was a station on the Somerset and Dorset Joint Railway at Chilcompton in the county of Somerset in England and opened on 20 July 1874. Originally the station consisted of a single platform on the Down side with a station building and possibly also a siding. In 1876 a loop and second platform were opened on the Up side, controlled from a 16-lever signal-box on the Down platform, which also controlled access to the goods yard. The line to Binegar was doubled in 1885. In 1886 the line to Midsomer Norton and Radstock was doubled and a replacement 13 lever signal box provided just beyond the Binegar end of the Up platform. The station closed to goods in 1964 and the signal-box closed in 1965; passenger services were withdrawn when the SDJR closed on 7 March 1966.

== The site today ==
As of 2020, the station was currently overgrown and partly fenced off in a transport yard. The line south from Midsomer Norton South 72 chains (1,400 m) has been rebuilt by the Somerset & Dorset Railway Heritage Trust, whose aim is to restore a further stretch of the line as far as Chilcompton itself.

Preceding station	Disused railways	Following station
Binegar; Line and station closed	Somerset & Dorset Joint Railway; LSWR & Midland Railways	Midsomer Norton South; Line and station closed
