= Binegar railway station =

Disused railway station in Binegar, Mendip

Coordinates: 51.24068°N 2.55146°W

Binegar
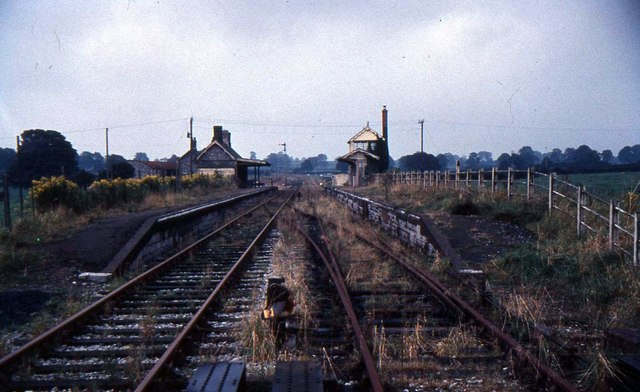
- Binegar railway station in 1967

General information
- Location: Binegar, Somerset; England, United Kingdom
- Grid reference: ST616492
- Platforms: 2

Other information
- Status: Disused

History
- Pre-grouping: Somerset and Dorset Joint Railway
- Post-grouping: SR and LMSR; Western Region of British Railways

Key dates
- 20 July 1874: Opened
- 7 March 1966: Closed
Location

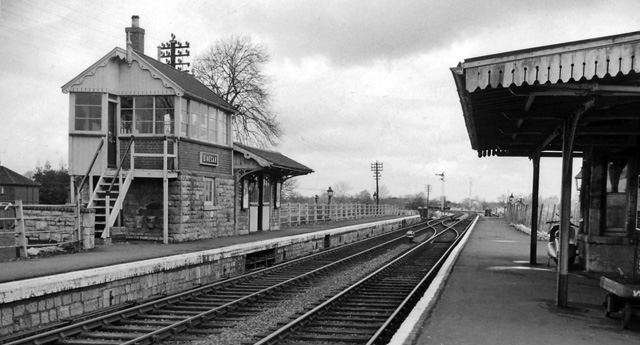
Binegar Station in 1963

Binegar railway station was a station on the Somerset and Dorset Joint Railway in the county of Somerset in England. Opened on 20 July 1874, the station consisted of two platforms, with a building on the down platform. There was a substantial goods yard with two sheds and sidings, controlled from a 24 lever signal box. Being the first station north of the line's summit at Masbury Binegar was also where locomotives used as banking engines on north-bound trains would drop off and cross the line ready to return south.

The station closed to goods in 1963: passenger services were withdrawn when the SDJR closed on 7 March 1966.

== Accident ==
There were several fatalities in two accidents near this station in the 1880s.

== The site today ==
The site is now occupied by a large private house.

Preceding station	Disused railways	Following station
Masbury; Line and station closed	Somerset & Dorset Joint Railway; LSWR and Midland Railways	Chilcompton; Line and station closed
