= Evercreech =

Village in Somerset, England

Coordinates: 51.1445°N 2.5068°W

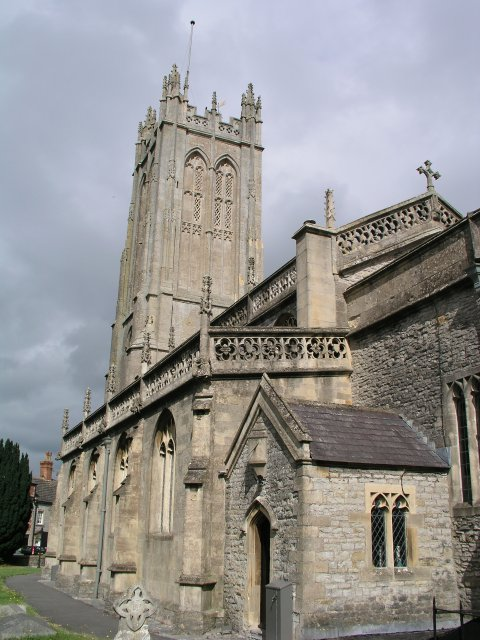
- Church of St Peter, Evercreech

- Location within Somerset
- Population: 2,334 (2011 Census)
- OS grid reference: ST645385
- Civil parish: Evercreech
- Unitary authority: Somerset
- Ceremonial county: Somerset
- Region: South West
- Country: England
- Sovereign state: United Kingdom
- Post town: SHEPTON MALLET
- Postcode district: BA4
- Dialling code: 01749
- Police: Avon and Somerset
- Fire: Devon and Somerset
- Ambulance: South Western
- UK Parliament: Frome and East Somerset
- Website: Evercreech Parish Council

Evercreech is a village and civil parish in Somerset, England. The village is 3 miles (5 km) southeast of Shepton Mallet, and 5 miles (8 km) northeast of Castle Cary. The parish includes the hamlet of Stoney Stratton and the village of Chesterblade.

== History ==
The village was recorded as Evrecriz in the Domesday Book of 1086.

Small Down Knoll (or Small Down Camp) is a Bronze Age hill fort above the village which rises to 728 feet (222 m).

The parish was part of the hundred of Wells Forum.

=== Evercreech's role in World War Two ===
War was declared on 3rd September, 1939, and later that month, the local village school received 215 children evacuees, 18 teachers and 6 helpers, from two schools in West Ham, East London.

In 1941, 50 more children and their teachers arrived from Bristol after a bombing from Germany.

The children were welcomed into the homes of the villagers. However, rationing was a prominent issue even though many of the children had come with their own ration book.

Schools also had to adapt as their current teaching facilities and schedules could not accommodate and teach all of the extra students. The village town hall was used as an extra space and volunteers helped to look after the children and assist the teachers in the parish.

American soldiers had been arriving in Evercreech ever since 1942; however, in 1944, a group of African-American G.I.s were sent to the area. Most people in rural Somerset had never seen a Black person before, so seeing African-American soldiers was a novelty for the Evercreech population. However, the people of Evercreech welcomed the Black G.I.s in the same way they welcomed evacuees throughout the war, and the American presence was a boost to the morale of the British public.

The troops helped out in schools and gave the children chocolates, fruits and chewing gum, which was a rarity in rationed Britain. Moreover, to raise money for the Spitfire funds, the village and the American soldiers held dances where they enjoyed American jazz music. Here, the African-American men could socialise and dance with white women, which was a novelty, and something forbidden in segregated America and often inter-racial relationships would be formed at these dances.

Overall, the Americans brought fun and friendship to Evercreech in an exceptional circumstance, and Evercreech welcomed them into their lives.

== Governance ==
The parish council has responsibility for local issues, including setting an annual precept (local rate) to cover the council's operating costs and producing annual accounts for public scrutiny. The parish council evaluates local planning applications and works with the local police, district council officers, and neighbourhood watch groups on matters of crime, security, and traffic. The parish council's role also includes initiating projects for the maintenance and repair of parish facilities, as well as consulting with the district council on the maintenance, repair, and improvement of highways, drainage, footpaths, public transport, and street cleaning. Conservation matters (including trees and listed buildings) and environmental issues are also the responsibility of the council.

For local government purposes, since 1 April 2023, the parish comes under the unitary authority of Somerset Council. Prior to this, it was part of the non-metropolitan district of Mendip from 1974 to 2023 (established under the Local Government Act 1972). It was part of Shepton Mallet Rural District from 1894 to 1974.

The village falls in 'Creech' electoral ward. The area and population of this ward are stated above.

It is also part of the Frome and East Somerset county constituency represented in the House of Commons of the Parliament of the United Kingdom. It elects one Member of Parliament (MP) by the first past the post system of election.

== Landmarks ==
There are two pubs in the village: The Bell Inn and The Pecking Mill. Historically, one of the local pubs, The Brewers Arms, celebrated New Year's Eve with fireworks, but on New Years Day 2005 it announced that it had closed forever. Rumours were rife around the reasons for the closure (most likely due to the non-profitability of such a local enterprise) - popularly noting that the real estate value of the site was extremely high. A fourth pub, the Pickled Inn (formerly The Shapway Inn) closed between 2021 and 2024.

Cutterne Mill is an old watermill. which is now being used for electricity generation as part of the South Somerset Hydropower Group

The market cross dates from the 15th century. It stands on four steps and a 3 metres (9.8 ft) high shaft. In the 19th century the cruciform head was restored. It is a Grade II* listed building and has been scheduled as an ancient monument.

== Industry ==
Historic industries in Evercreech include quarrying of blue lias and clay; brick making; milk processing; and agriculture, which remains the leading industry today. From the late 18th century until just after World War I, silk processing was an important industry for Evercreech, a spillover from mills at nearby Bruton and Sherborne. The workforce for the village's three silk factories was made up almost entirely of young women and girls, some of whom started working as young as seven or eight years of age. Fulfilling orders from London, two of the factories were throwing mills which produced high quality spun silk thread. The third mill wove silk thread into cloth. Bales of raw silk were imported to the mills from France, Italy, and India by London merchants.

Employment in the mills was erratic, driven by highly volatile demand for English woven silk. This volatility was caused by embargoes on imported woven silk, duty taxes, and then the lifting of import restrictions in 1860.

== Transport ==
Evercreech Junction was a railway station on the Somerset and Dorset Joint Railway. It was replaced by Evercreech New railway station from 1874 to 1966, when it closed. Nowadays, the nearest railway stations to Evercreech are in Bruton and Castle Cary.

== Religious sites ==
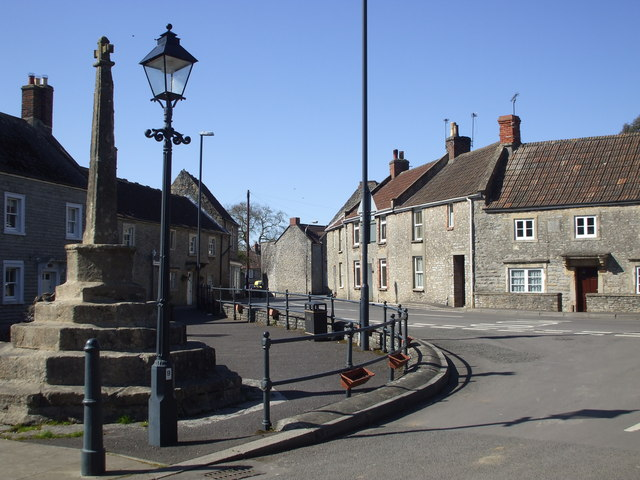
Market Cross

The Church of St Peter dates from the 14th century and is a Grade I listed building. The three-stage tower has set-back buttresses ascending to pinnacles, with a very tall transomed two-light bell-chamber with windows on each face The embattled parapet has quatrefoil piercing, with big corner pinnacles and smaller intermediate pinnacles. The four-light west window has extensively restored tracery. This tower is of the East Mendip type. On the north wall of the tower is a roll of honour to victims of World War I. It is within a rectangular wooden case with a glazed door crowned by a triangular pediment and plaque below.

The church's clock is unusual in that it is missing the 10th hour number, usually shown as the Roman numeral 'X'. The Roman numeral at the 10th hour position is XI (11) and it is followed by the Roman numeral for twelve (XII). Thus the numbers of the last quarter read IX (9) - XI (11) - XII (12) - XII (12). Local rumour suggests that the person who paid for the clock to be made, was instructed by his wife that he had to be home from the pub by 10 o'clock. Therefore, he ensured that the 10 o'clock numeral (X) was missing.

The sounds of the bells at Evercreech church were used in the opening credits of BBC's Songs of Praise for many years. There were many complaints.

At Chesterblade the tiny Church of St Mary dates from the 12th century.
