= John Pinch the Younger =

English architect

John Pinch (1796–1849) was an architect, working mainly in the city of Bath, England, and surveyor to the Pulteney and Darlington estate. He was the son of John Pinch the elder, also an architect and surveyor to the estate.

== Career ==
John Pinch was in joint practice with his father, John Pinch the elder, by 1819, and later joined by his younger brother Charles (1807–1854). He succeeded his father as surveyor to the Darlington Estate on the latter's death in 1827. Along with his father he was responsible for many of the later Georgian buildings in Bath, especially in Bathwick. He died unmarried on 23 December 1849 in Bathwick.

== Works ==
In the 1820s he worked with his father. His first independent commission was work on The Nunnery, Douglas on the Isle of Man in 1828. Closer to his home, he worked on local churches including St Saviour's Church, Larkhall, Bath between 1829 and 1831 (probably to designs by his father), and St John the Baptist Church in Midsomer Norton in 1830. Also in 1830 he worked on several buildings which make up the west side of Queen Square in Bath.

Further work followed on churches in Somerset and Wiltshire, including the north aisle of St John the Baptist Church in Batheaston during 1834, and, in 1836, the church of St Mary the Virgin in Grittleton. In the same year he designed additions to the Sydney Hotel in Bathwick which later became the Holburne Museum of Art.

He worked on several further churches including, in 1836, the south aisle of Littleton Church, Christ Church at Downside, Chilcompton, and a year later the Church of the Holy Trinity in Paulton. In 1843 he worked on Farrington Gurney church.

He also worked on private houses such as Compton House in Over Compton, around 1840.

== Sources ==
- Robert Bennet, The last of the Georgian architects of Bath: the life and times of John Pinch, Bath History IX (2002) 87–103
- H.M. Colvin, A Biographical Dictionary of British Architects, 1600–1840 (1997) ISBN 0-300-07207-4
- M. Forsyth, Bath, Pevsner Architectural Guides (2003) ISBN 0-300-10177-5
- Maurice Scott, Discovering Widcombe and Lyncombe, Bath, 1993, ISBN )-9520876-0-X
