= St Peter's Church, Evercreech =

Church in Somerset, England

Church of St Peter
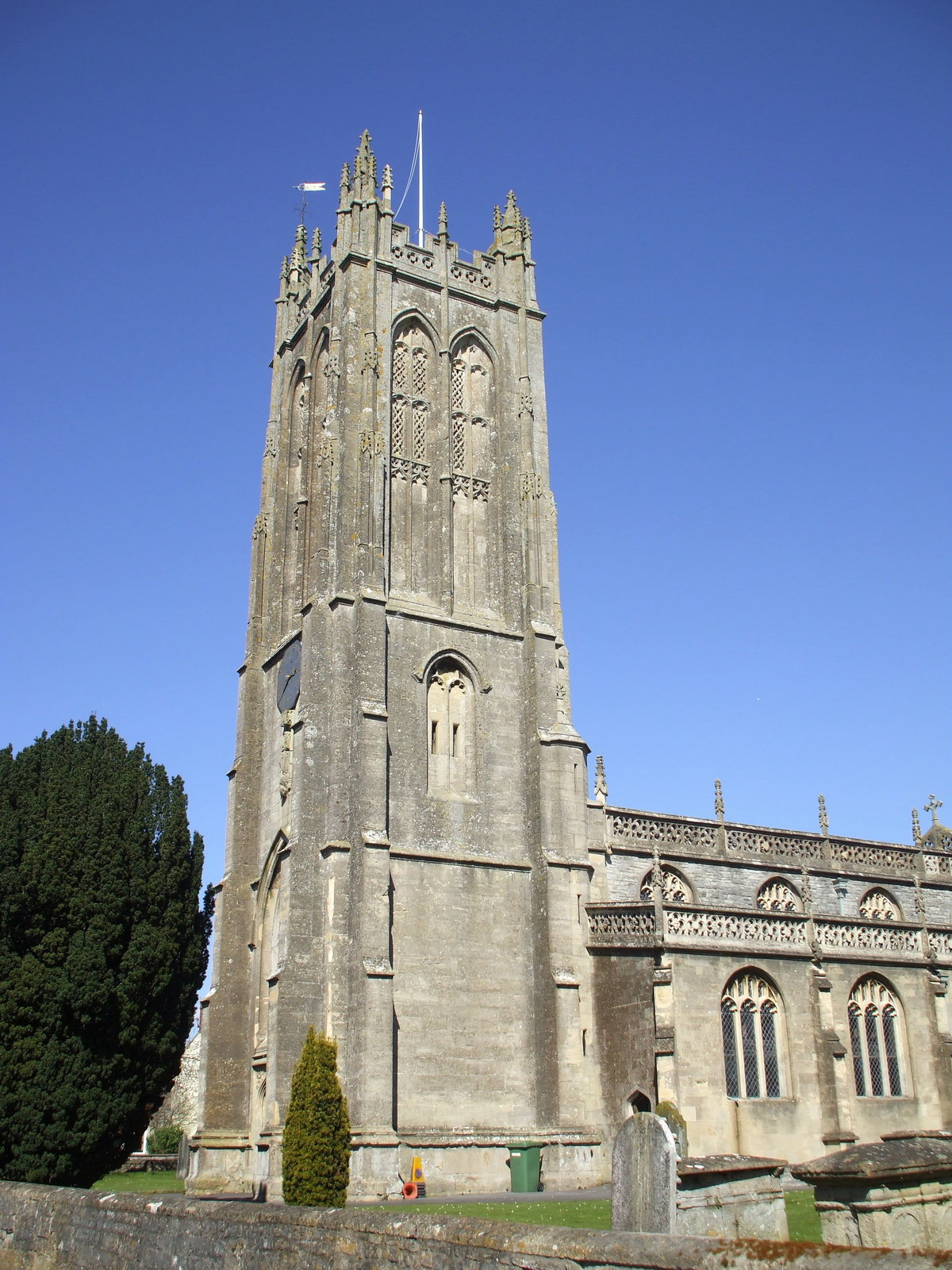

- Location within Somerset

General information
- Location: Evercreech, England
- Coordinates: 51.1462°N 2.5027°W
- Completed: 14th century

Height
- Height: 94 feet (29 metres)

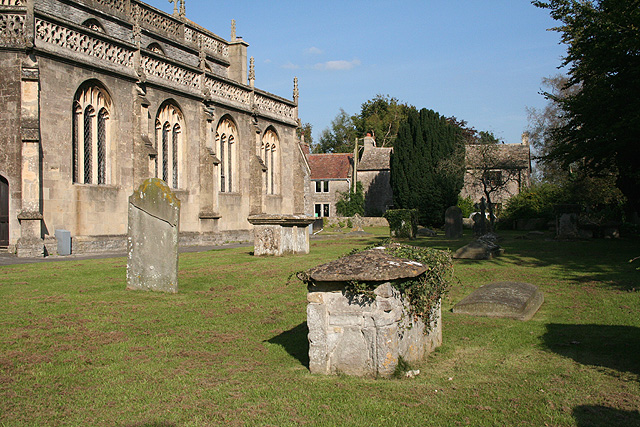
evercreech church

The Church of St Peter in Evercreech, Somerset, England, dates from the 14th century and is a Grade I listed building.

The three-stage tower has set-back buttresses ascending to pinnacles, with a very tall transomed two-light bell-chamber with windows on each face The embattled parapet has quatrefoil piercing, with big corner pinnacles and smaller intermediate pinnacles. The four-light west window has extensively restored tracery. This tower is of the East Mendip type, and was completed around 1462. It is 94 feet (29 metres) high to the top of the pinnacles.

On the north wall of the tower is a roll of honour to victims of World War I. It is within a rectangular wooden case with a glazed door crowned by a triangular pediment and plaque below.

The clock face features an unusual mistake as it is missing the X (10) replaced by an X1 and two XII (12).

The vicar in 1843 was Charles Napier.

== See also ==
- List of Grade I listed buildings in Mendip
- List of towers in Somerset
- List of ecclesiastical parishes in the Diocese of Bath and Wells
