= Saint Vigor =

French bishop, saint and Christian missionary

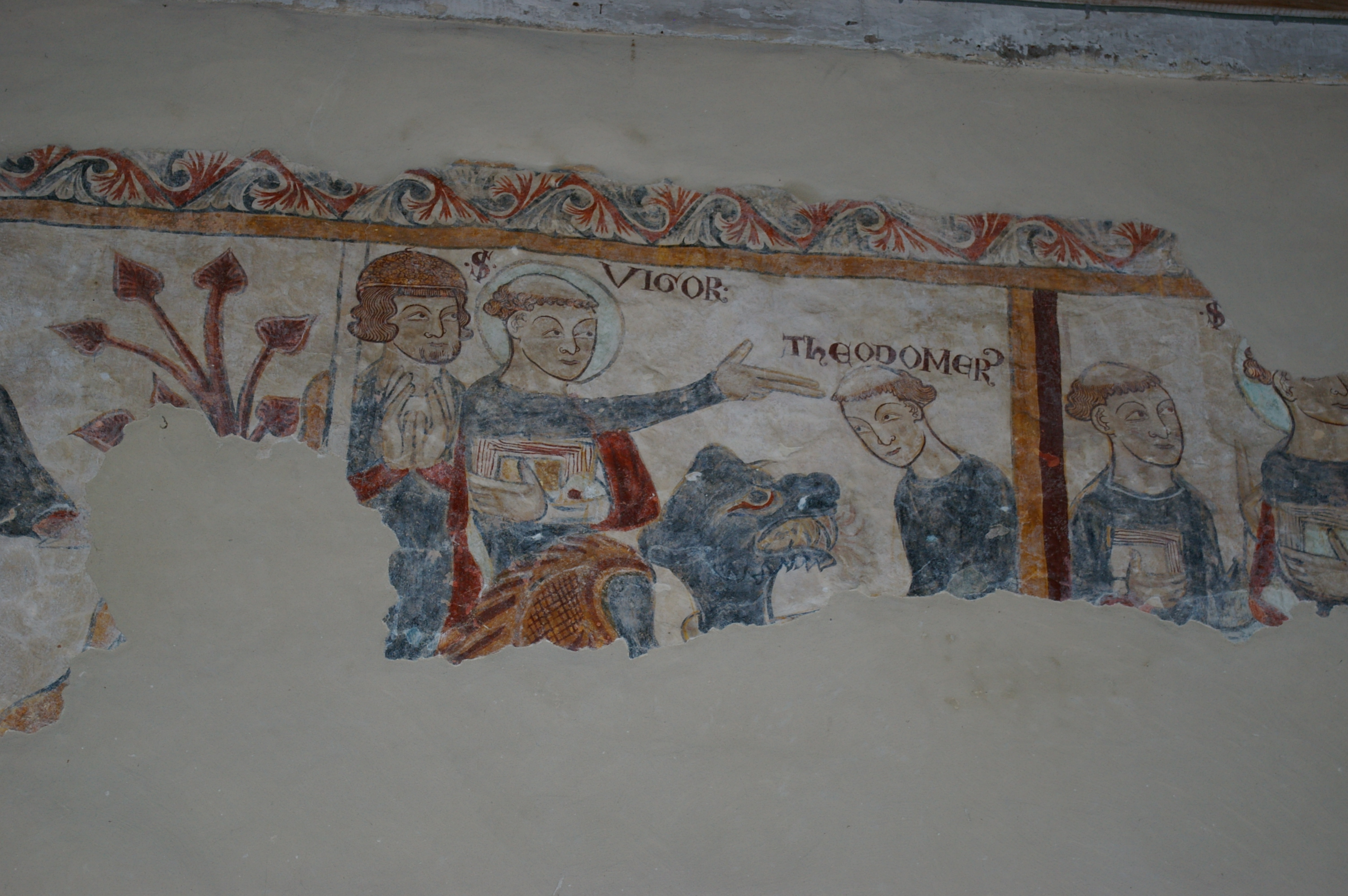
- Fresco at the Church of St Vigor de Neau
- Born: Artois
- Died: circa 537 AD
- Venerated in: Eastern Orthodox Church; Roman Catholic Church
- Feast: 1 November

Saint Vigor (French: Saint Vigor, Vigeur; Latin: Vigor, Vigorus) (died circa 537 AD) was a French bishop and Christian missionary.

== Life ==
Born into the nobility in Artois, he studied at Arras under Saint Vedast. His father would not grant approval for him to become a priest, so he ran away from home, taking nothing with him, accompanied by an acolyte, Theodimir. Thereafter, he became a hermit preacher at Reviers, Calvados, and worked as a missionary. Vigor was named bishop of Bayeux around 514.

He fervently opposed paganism and reputedly founded a monastery, later known as Saint-Vigor-le-Grand. In Bayeux, Normandy, he destroyed a pagan temple that was still in use and built a church on the grounds.

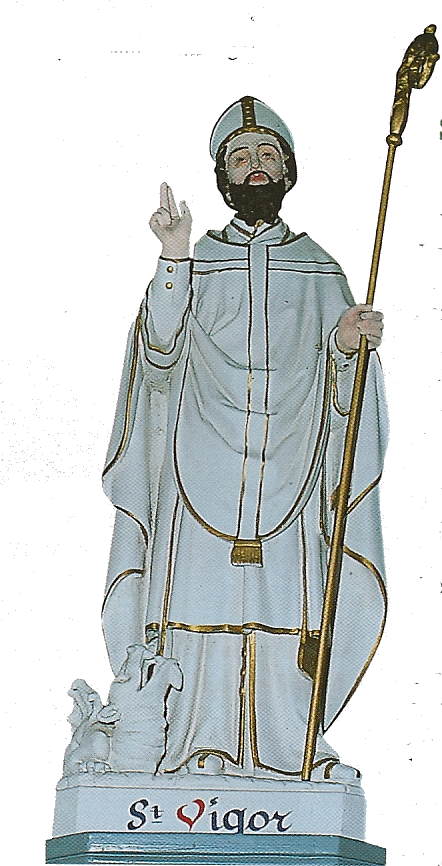
Saint Vigor, Saint-Vigor-des-Monts (Manche)

== Veneration ==
Vigor was venerated from an early date in Bayeux, where he had been bishop. His cult as a saint is attested in 834 by mention of a relic at Le Mans. Around 987 Vigor's relics came to the Abbey of Saint-Riquier in Ponthieu. Saint-Ouen Abbey, Rouen held a copy of the Vita Vigoris; John Howe dates the "vita"s composition to the beginning of the eleventh century. In 1032 Robert the Magnificent, Duke of Normandy, founded an abbey dedicated to Saint Vigor on the site of an older monastery destroyed by the Normans during their invasion.

The successful Norman conquest brought his cult to England. His name appears in an eleventh-century breviary at Worcester, possibly introduced by bishop Samson or Theulf, both of whom had been canons at Bayeux.

Two English churches have been dedicated to Vigor; one in Fulbourn, Cambridgeshire, the other in Stratton-on-the-Fosse, Somerset. His feast falls on All Saints' Day (1 November), and as a result is often moved to another date. Saint Vigor is mentioned in the life (vita) of Saint Paternus.

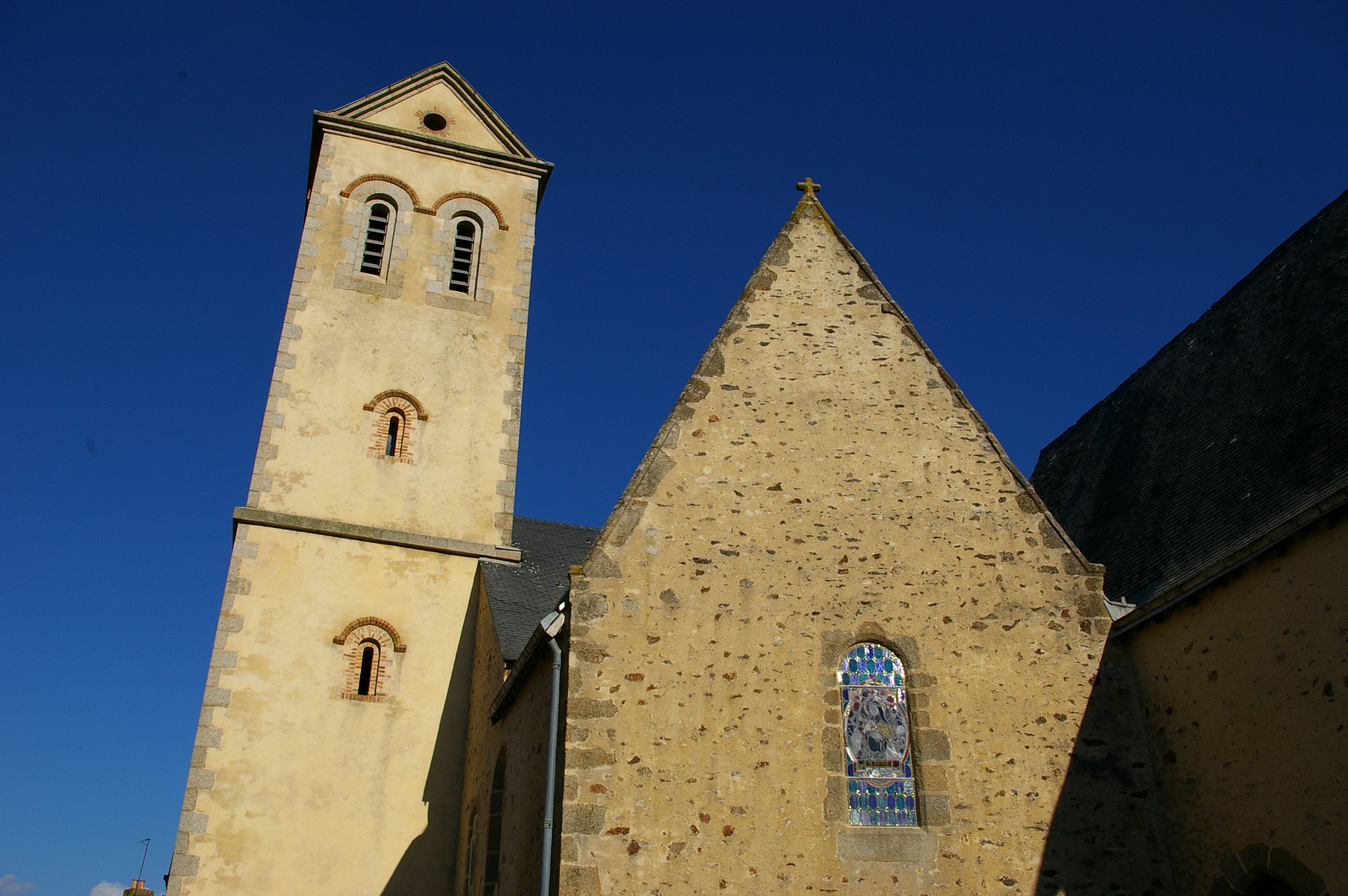
Église St Vigor Neau, French Maine.

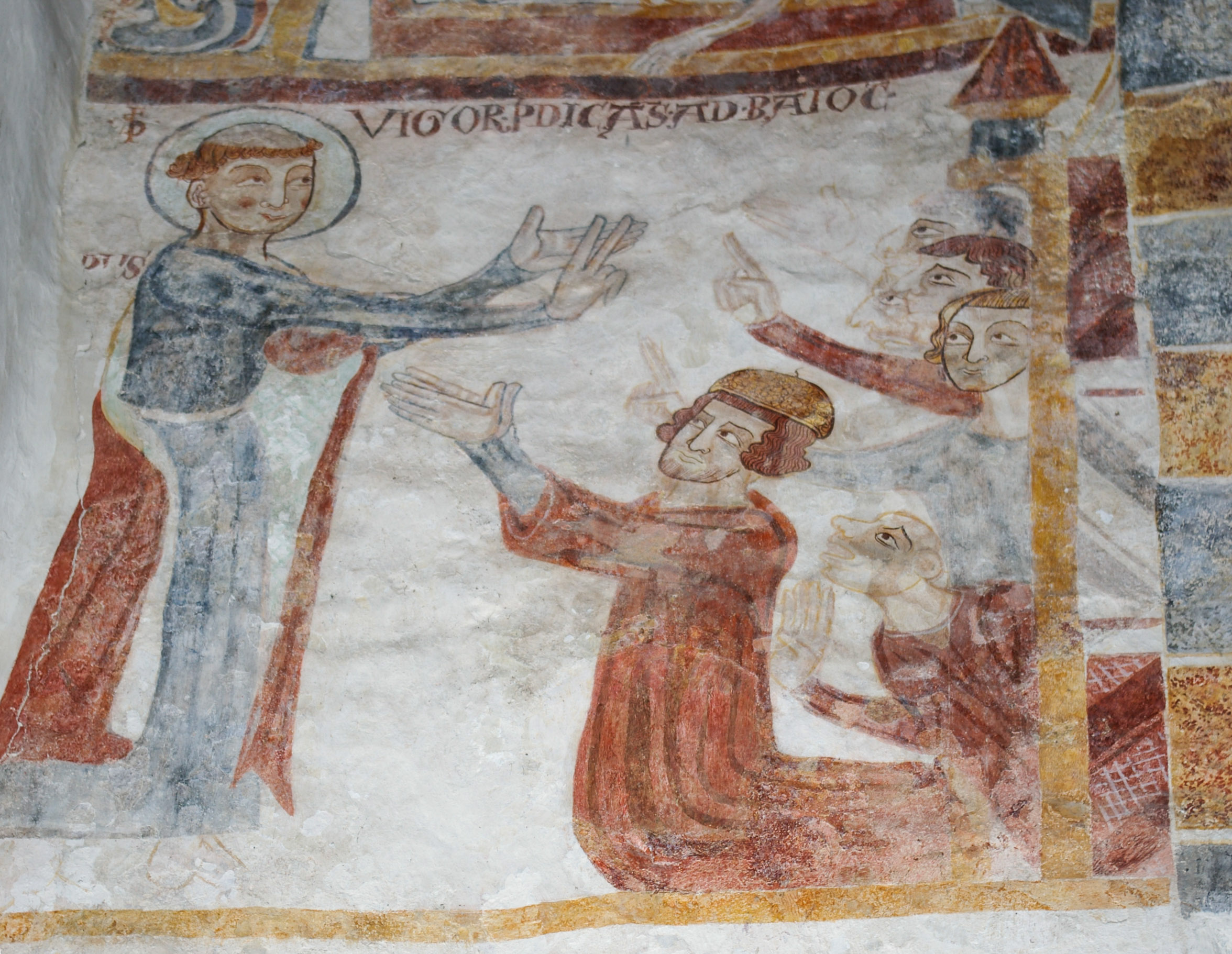
Fresco at the Church of St Vigor de Neau.

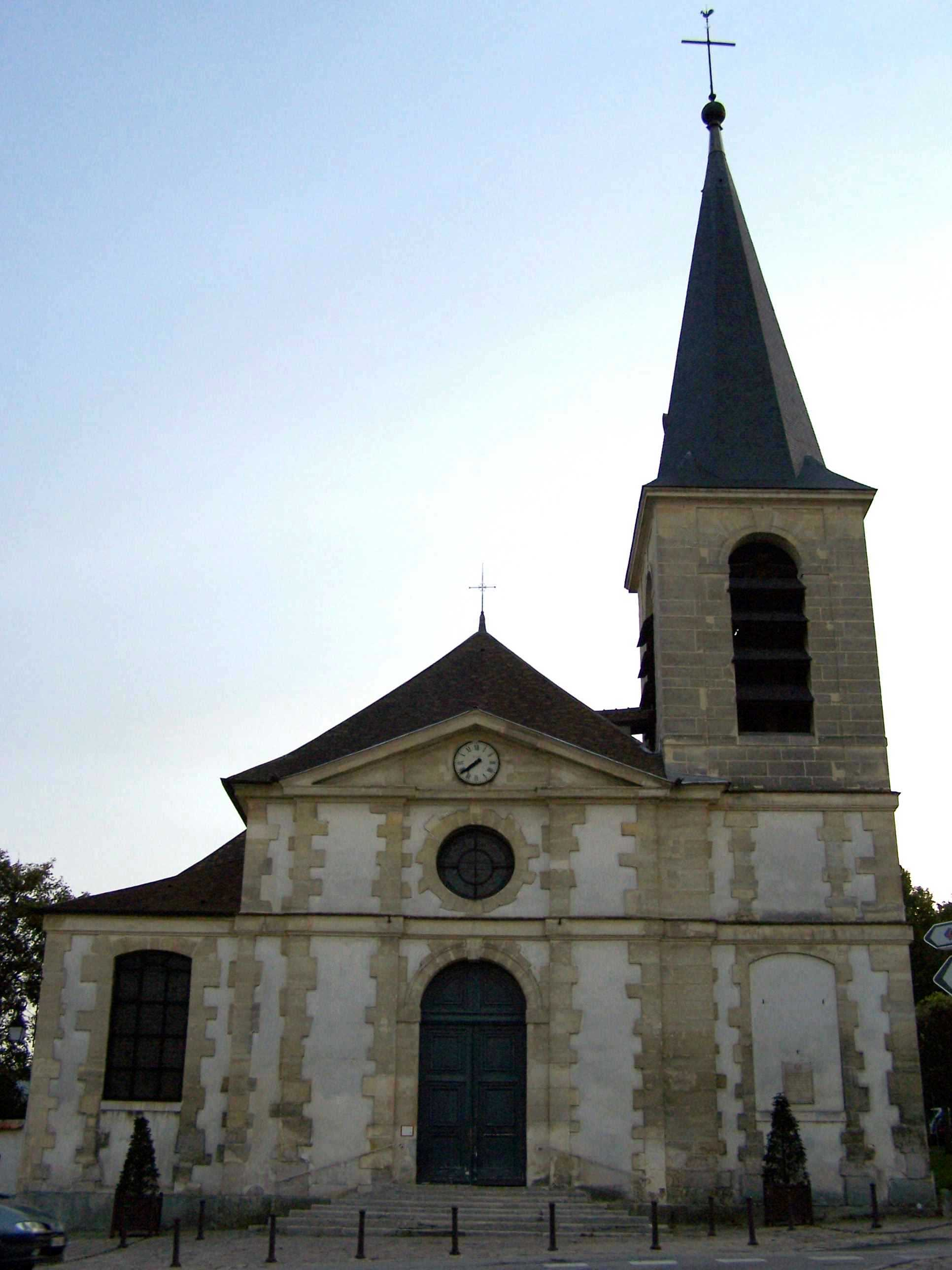
Église Saint-Vigor at Marly-le-Roi, Île-de-France

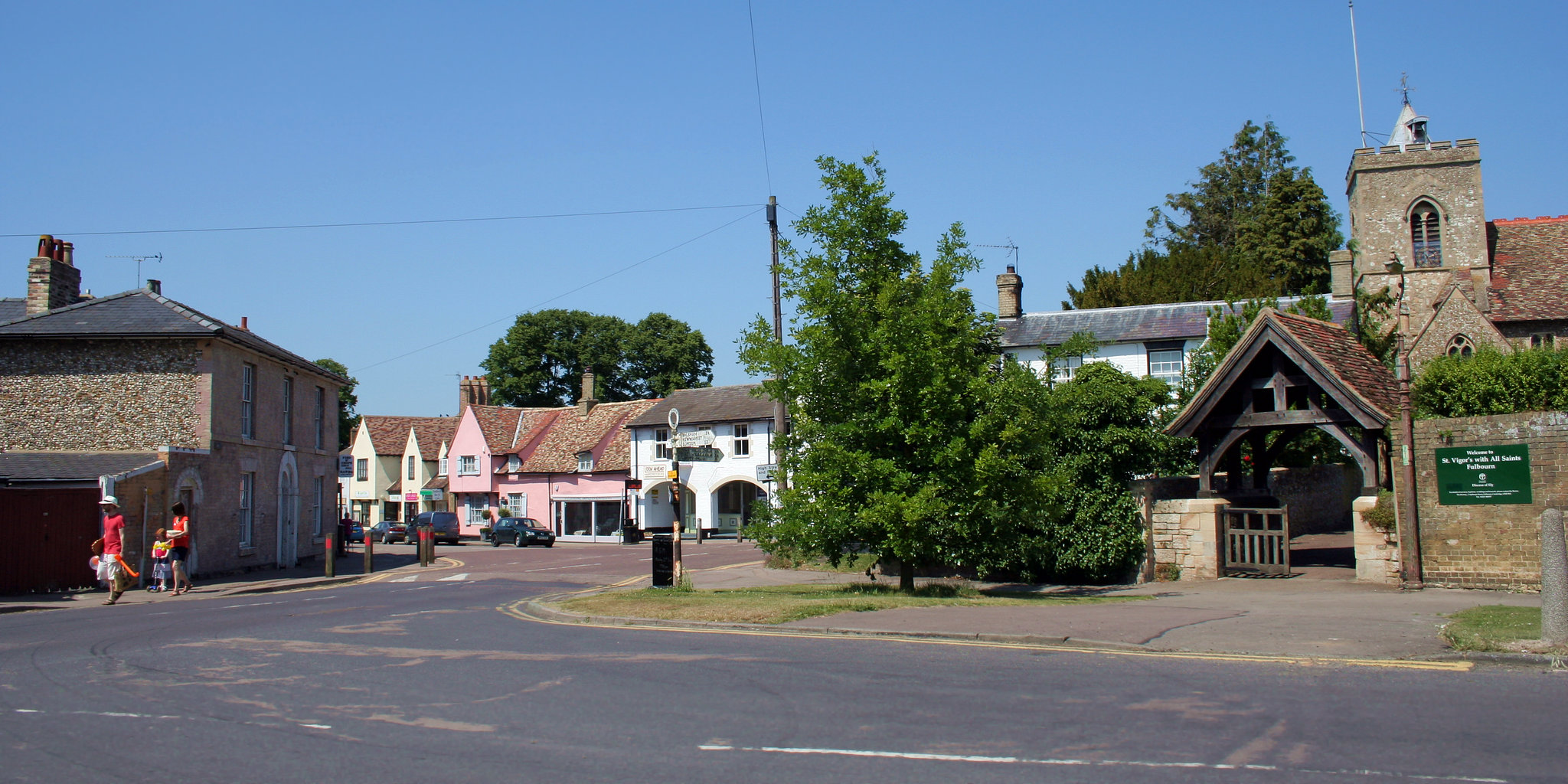
Church of St Vigor with All Saints at Fulbourn, England
