= Stratton-on-the-Fosse =

Village in Somerset, England

Coordinates: 51.25262°N 2.49573°W

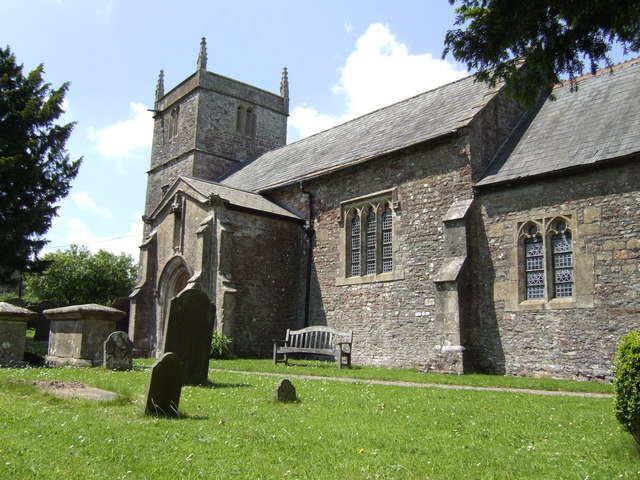
- Church of St Vigor, Stratton-on-the-Fosse

- Location within Somerset
- Population: 1,108 (2011)
- OS grid reference: ST655505
- Unitary authority: Somerset Council
- Ceremonial county: Somerset
- Region: South West
- Country: England
- Sovereign state: United Kingdom
- Post town: RADSTOCK
- Postcode district: BA3
- Dialling code: 01761
- Police: Avon and Somerset
- Fire: Devon and Somerset
- Ambulance: South Western
- UK Parliament: Frome and East Somerset

Stratton-on-the-Fosse is a village and civil parish located on the edge of the Mendip Hills, 2 miles (3 km) south-west of Westfield, 6 miles (10 km) north-east of Shepton Mallet, and 9 miles (14 km) from Frome, in Somerset, England. It has a population of 1,108, and has a rural agricultural landscape, although it was part of the once-thriving Somerset coalfield. Within the boundaries of the parish are the hamlets of Benter and Nettlebridge.

Stratton-on-the-Fosse straddles the Fosse Way, an ancient Roman road which linked the cities of Lincoln and Exeter. It lies between the parish of Westfield, Somerset and the village of Oakhill.

St Vigor and St John Church of England Primary School is situated in nearby Chilcompton.

== History ==
There is evidence of human occupation of the area since the Bronze Age with skeletons and pottery being found in local caves. Blacker's Hill is believed to be an Iron Age camp occupied by the Belgae in the later Iron Age with the Romans later occupying it.

The parish of Stratton-on-the-Fosse was part of the Kilmersdon Hundred,

The manor was given to Glastonbury Abbey by King Edgar the Peaceful and during the time of Edward the Confessor was let by the abbey to a Saxon thane named Alwold. After the Norman Conquest in 1066, William the Conqueror took many lands, including Stratton-on-the-Fosse, from the abbey and gave them to Geoffrey de Montbray the Bishop of Coutances. The manor later passed to the Gourney family. Sir Thomas de Gournay was concerned in the murder of Edward II at Berkeley Castle, for which his estates were confiscated, and Stratton was later annexed to the Duchy of Cornwall.

Land just south of Benter Cross which contains the remains of coal mines from around 1700 is owned by the Somerset Wildlife Trust to be managed for grassland species. Benter House is a small country house dating from 1829. It has been designated by English Heritage as a Grade II listed building.

Many of the houses in Nettlebridge are owned by the Duchy of Cornwall.

Coal mining on the Somerset coalfield was a major industry but all mines have now closed.

== Governance ==
The parish council has responsibility for local issues, including setting an annual precept (local rate) to cover the council's operating costs and producing annual accounts for public scrutiny. The parish council evaluates local planning applications and works with the local police, district council officers, and neighbourhood watch groups on matters of crime, security, and traffic. The parish council's role also includes initiating projects for the maintenance and repair of parish facilities, as well as consulting with the district council on the maintenance, repair, and improvement of highways, drainage, footpaths, public transport, and street cleaning. Conservation matters (including trees and listed buildings) and environmental issues are also the responsibility of the council.

For local government purposes, since 1 April 2023, the parish comes under the unitary authority of Somerset Council. Prior to this, it was part of the non-metropolitan district of Mendip (established under the Local Government Act 1972). It was part of Shepton Mallet Rural District before 1974.

It is also part of the Frome and East Somerset county constituency represented in the House of Commons of the Parliament of the United Kingdom. It elects one Member of Parliament (MP) by the first past the post system of election.

== Geography ==
Very close to Nettlebridge is the ancient Harridge Wood, which is in the care of the Somerset Wildlife Trust. It comprises five sites with a total area of 54 ha (133 acres). It forms a major element of the Mells Valley Prime Biodiversity Area.

== Landmarks ==
Hill House in Nettlebridge, a former pub, is a Grade II listed building.

Manor Farmhouse on the edge of the village is a Grade II listed building.

== Religious sites ==
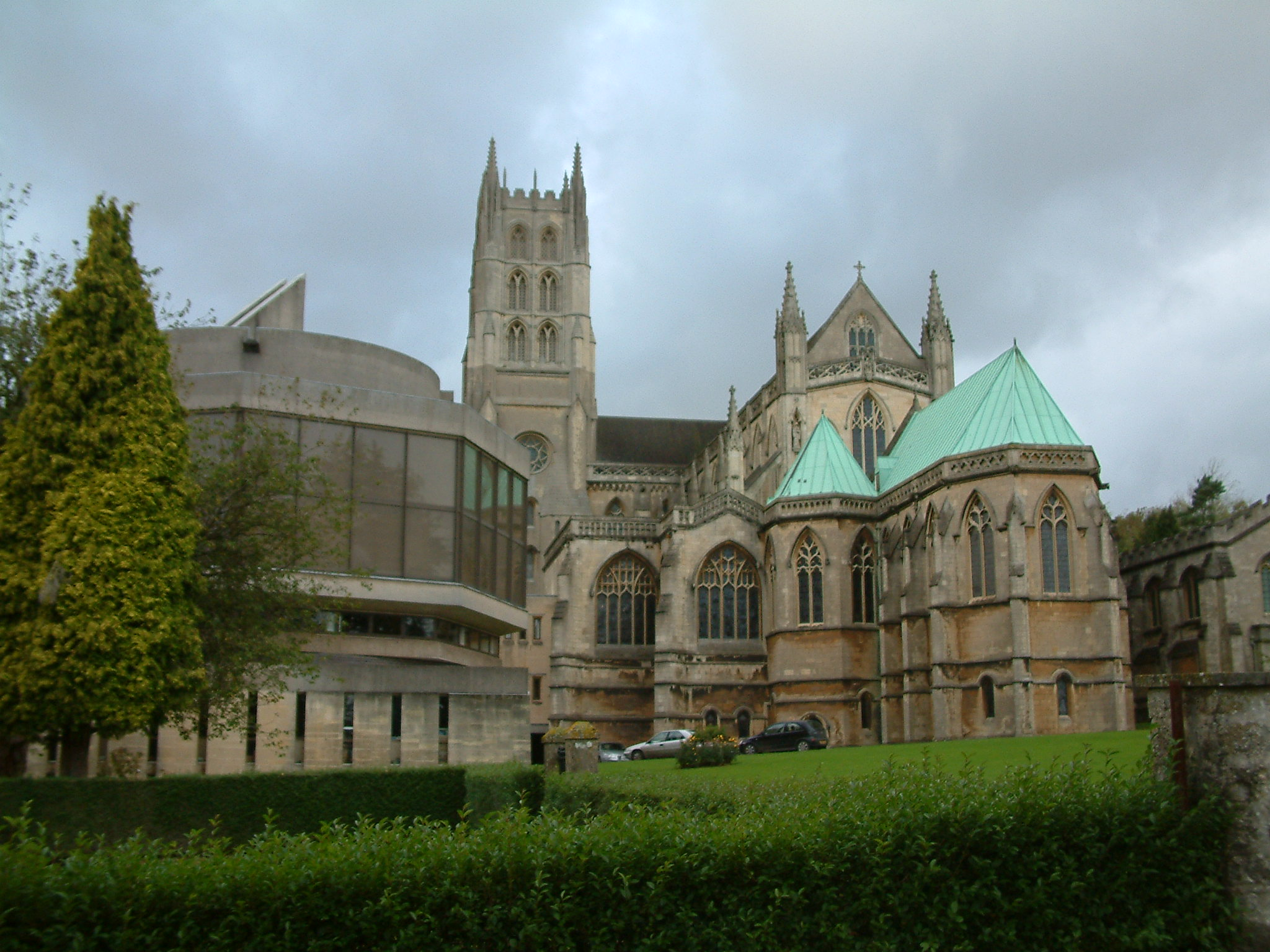
Downside Abbey

The abbey church of St Gregory the Great, which is known as Downside Abbey church, is an example of neo-gothic architecture. It dominates the village with its 55 metres (180 ft) tower, and is a Grade I listed building. Downside School, which has grown in conjunction with the abbey, is a Roman Catholic Public School. There is also a catholic church in the village which is dedicated to St Benedict and opened in 1857. From 1952–87 the parish priest here was the eminent composer and liturgist Dom Gregory Murray.

The Anglican Church of St. Vigor dates from the 12th century and is also Grade I listed.
