= Chilcompton =

Village and civil parish in Somerset, England

Coordinates: 51.2686°N 2.5025°W

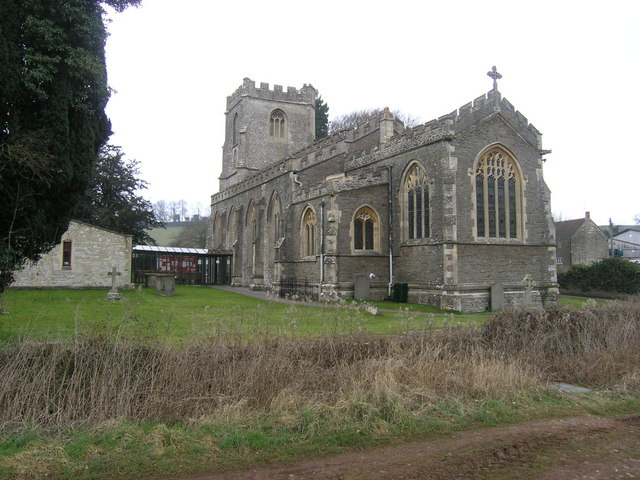
- St John the Baptist's Church

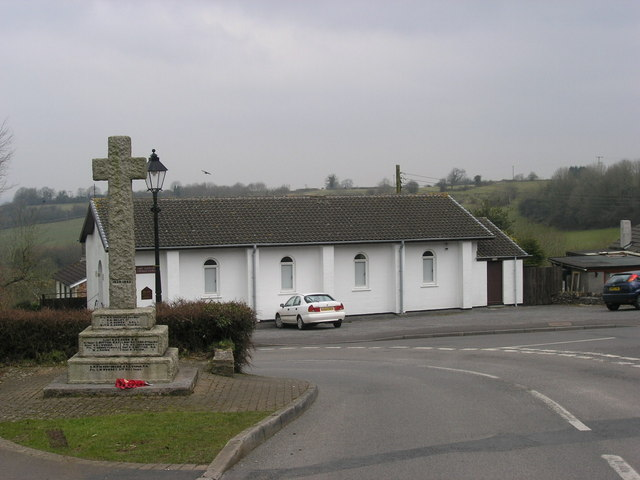
- St Aldhelm's Church

- Location within Somerset
- Area: 7.06 km^{2} (2.73 sq mi)
- Population: 2,062 (2011)
  - Density: 292/km^{2} (760/sq mi)
- OS grid reference: ST645515
- Unitary authority: Somerset Council
- Ceremonial county: Somerset
- Region: South West
- Country: England
- Sovereign state: United Kingdom
- Post town: RADSTOCK
- Postcode district: BA3
- Dialling code: 01761
- Police: Avon and Somerset
- Fire: Devon and Somerset
- Ambulance: South Western
- UK Parliament: Frome and East Somerset

Chilcompton is a village and civil parish in Somerset, England, in the Mendip Hills two miles south of Midsomer Norton and 3.0 miles south-west of Westfield. It is on the B3139 road between Radstock and Wells, close to the A37 (between Shepton Mallet and Bristol).

== History ==
The parish was part of the hundred of Chewton.

The village's history is mainly that of farming and mining. There is a coal waste mound in the north-east end of the village. The village used to have Chilcompton railway station on the Somerset and Dorset Joint Railway, which closed in 1966.

== Governance ==
The parish council has responsibility for local issues, including setting an annual precept (local rate) to cover the council’s operating costs and producing annual accounts for public scrutiny. The parish council evaluates local planning applications and works with the local police, district council officers, and neighbourhood watch groups on matters of crime, security, and traffic. The parish council's role also includes initiating projects for the maintenance and repair of parish facilities, as well as consulting with the district council on the maintenance, repair, and improvement of highways, drainage, footpaths, public transport, and street cleaning. Conservation matters (including trees and listed buildings) and environmental issues are also the responsibility of the council.

For local government purposes, since 1 April 2023, the parish comes under the unitary authority of Somerset Council. Prior to this, it was part of the non-metropolitan district of Mendip (established under the Local Government Act 1972). It was part of Clutton Rural District before 1974.

The village falls in the Ashwick, Chilcompton and Stratton electoral ward. From Chilcompton the ward stretches south to Ashwick. The ward total population taken at the 2011 census was 4,835.

It is also part of the Frome and East Somerset constituency represented in the House of Commons of the Parliament of the United Kingdom. It elects one Member of Parliament (MP) by the first past the post system of election.

== Geography ==
Chilcompton has a population of 1,918. The village is situated one mile west of the Fosse Way Roman road, Downside Abbey, and Downside School, and one mile north-east of Blacker's Hill fort. The only bus service that serves Chilcompton is the 173 Bath to Wells Mendip Xplorer service operated by First West of England. There are also several bus routes running between neighbouring villages and the town of Midsomer Norton.

The village has a well called Fry's Well which lends its name to a road.

The River Somer rises in small streams around Chilcompton.

== Education ==
Chilcompton has a primary school called St. Vigor and St. John. The village also has four nearby state secondary schools, The Blue School in Wells, Norton Hill School and Somervale School in Midsomer Norton and Writhlington School in Radstock. There are two private schools nearby, Wells Cathedral School and Downside School. The nearest universities are in Bath and Bristol.

== Economy ==
Chilcompton is the headquarters of the fashion company Mulberry Group plc.

There is a local store which belongs to the co-operative society, as a branch of the Radstock district co-operative society. There are also two hairdressers in the village, along with a small industrial estate in the north-east of the village. This estate has a few units of small businesses such as Nova fitness equipment and a small fruit machine distributor. There were four pubs in the village some time ago; currently there are two left: The Somerset Wagon (previously The Railway) and The Redan Inn. The Britannia and Naishes Crossing had been the other two, The Britannia being the later of the two to close in the 1980s.

== Religious sites ==
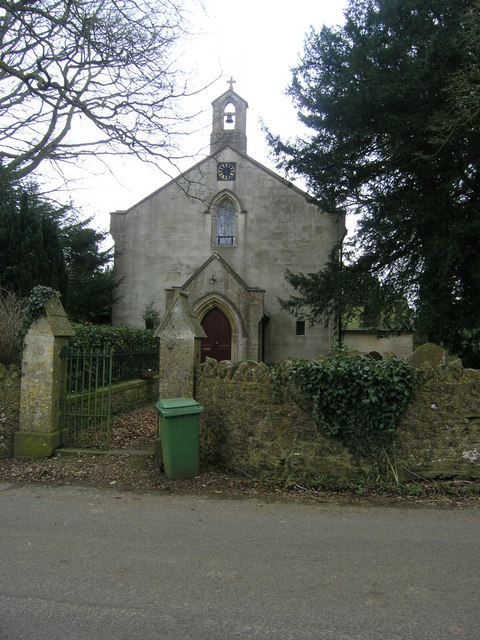
The former Christ Church

The Church of St John The Baptist dates from the 15th century and was largely rebuilt in the 19th. The perpendicular embattled tower dates from around 1460 and contains six bells. The nave and aisles were completed in 1839 by Jesse Gane and the chancel and flanking chapels in 1897 by Frederick Bligh Bond. An enclosed modern structure links it to the adjoining parish hall. It is a Grade II* listed building and lies a short distance to the north of the village. The ecclesiastical parish is now united with that of Saint Vigor's at Stratton-on-the-Fosse.

The former Christ Church on Stockhill Road, Downside, was built in 1838 by John Pinch the Younger. It was a Commissioners' church, which means it was built with money voted by Parliament as a result of the Church Building Acts of 1818 and 1824. The 1818 Act supplied a grant of money and established the Church Building Commission to direct its use, and in 1824 made a further grant of money. The building is no longer used for its religious function. It has been converted to a private residence.

Near the village cross there was a modern Catholic church dedicated to St Aldhelm that was built by Francis Pollen in 1976 and it was served by monks from the nearby Downside Abbey until its closure in 2015.

== Recreation ==
There is a skateboarding park in the north end of the village on the recreational ground, which also has a football pitch, a sports clubhouse and a tennis/basketball court. There are two more parks in the village, one of which is in the south end with a 5-a-side football pitch and a small playpark. There is another in a small cul-de-sac in the east side of the village. The primary school also hosts a multi-sports facility.

== Events ==
The village holds a village day fete every year, hosting live acts, games, stalls and foodstuffs, along with guest speakers such as Michael Eavis (owner of Glastonbury Festival). There have also been some charity events such as sports relief run-a-mile held in the recreational grounds. The primary school hosts summer and winter fairs. The village hall holds many events from the team at Take Art, a group providing a variety of entertainment, such as stand-up comedy, musical acts and other entertaining acts. The local actors guild (CADS — Chilcompton Amateur Dramatics Society) put on productions every year, traditionally comic, though recently they have moved to more serious plays, such as Shakespeare's Macbeth.

=== Sports clubs ===
The Chilcompton football team is in division 2 of the junior league. A cricket team is being organised to play the local village rival Stratton-on-the-Fosse.
