= Evercreech Junction railway station =

Former railway station in England

Coordinates: 51.1272°N 2.5168°W

Evercreech Junction
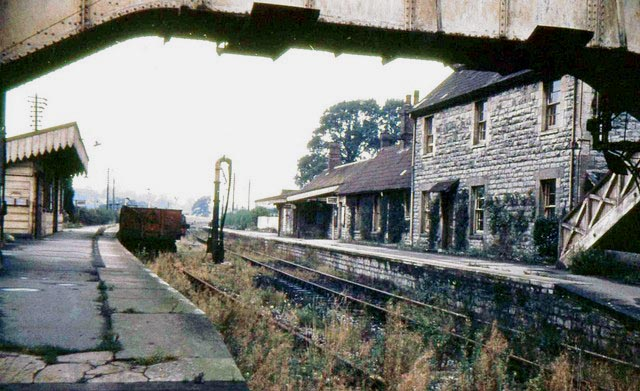
- Derelict station in September 1972

General information
- Location: Evercreech, Somerset; England
- Grid reference: ST639366
- Platforms: 2

Other information
- Status: Disused

History
- Pre-grouping: Somerset and Dorset Joint Railway
- Post-grouping: LMS / Southern Railway; Western Region of British Railways

Key dates
- 3 February 1862: Opened as "Evercreech"
- 20 July 1874: Renamed "Evercreech Junction"
- 29 November 1965: Closed to goods
- 7 March 1966: Closed to passengers
Location

Evercreech Junction was a railway station at Evercreech on the Somerset and Dorset Joint Railway.

Originally opened in 1862 as "Evercreech" on the original S&D line from Burnham-on-Sea to Broadstone, it became in 1874 the junction for the northwards extension towards Bath that bankrupted the company. A station opened on the Bath extension more than a mile to the north of Evercreech Junction, much nearer to the village of Evercreech, was called Evercreech Village, and later Evercreech New.

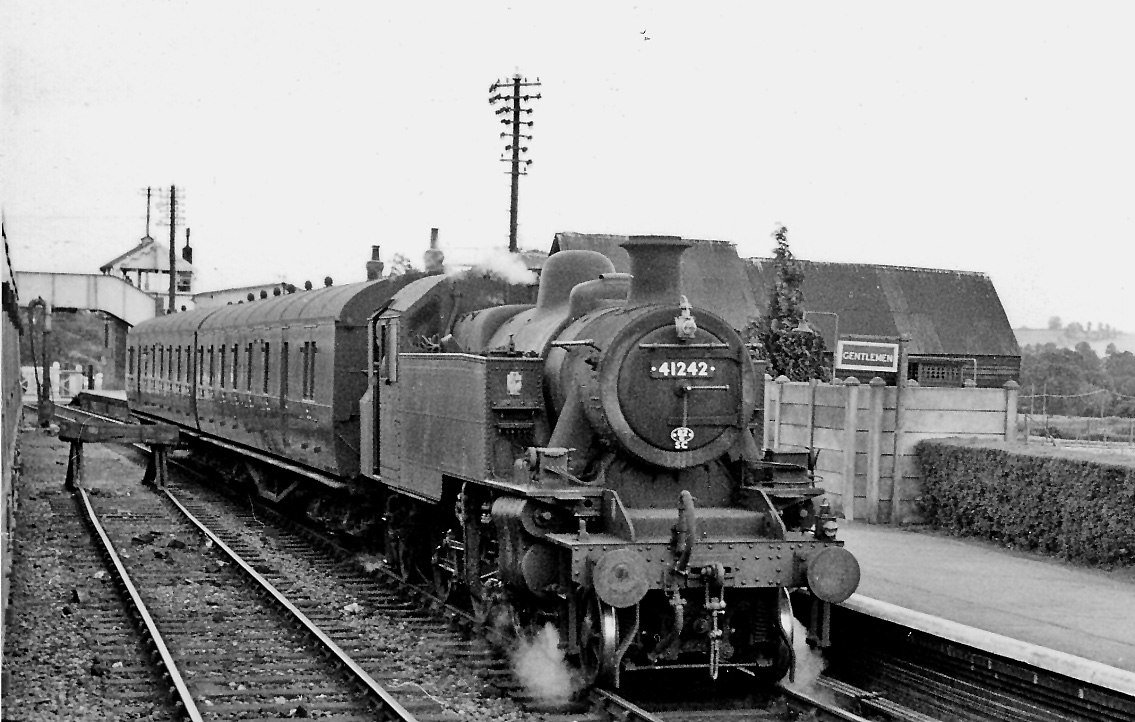
Highbridge branch train in 1962

The junction itself was to the north of the station, where there were also marshalling yards. Branch trains to and from Burnham and Highbridge started and finished at Evercreech in latter years. To the south of the station a level crossing carried the main A371 road across the line.

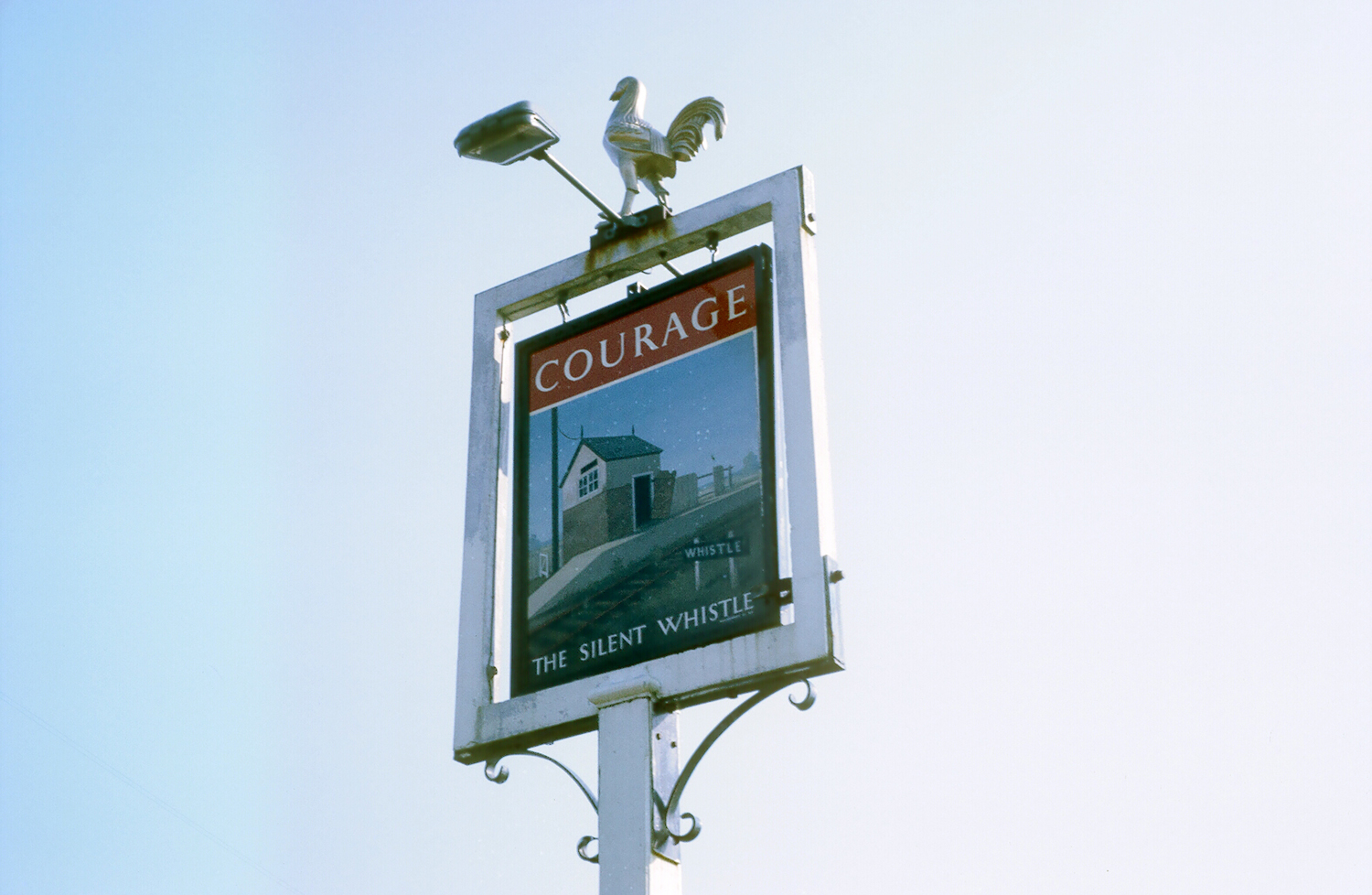
The former Railway Hotel, renamed after closure

In 1963 the station featured in "Branch Line Railway", a BBC documentary on the Joint Railway presented by John Betjeman. However, it was closed three years later along with the whole line as part of the Beeching axe. The station inn was renamed The Silent Whistle on the closure of the line.

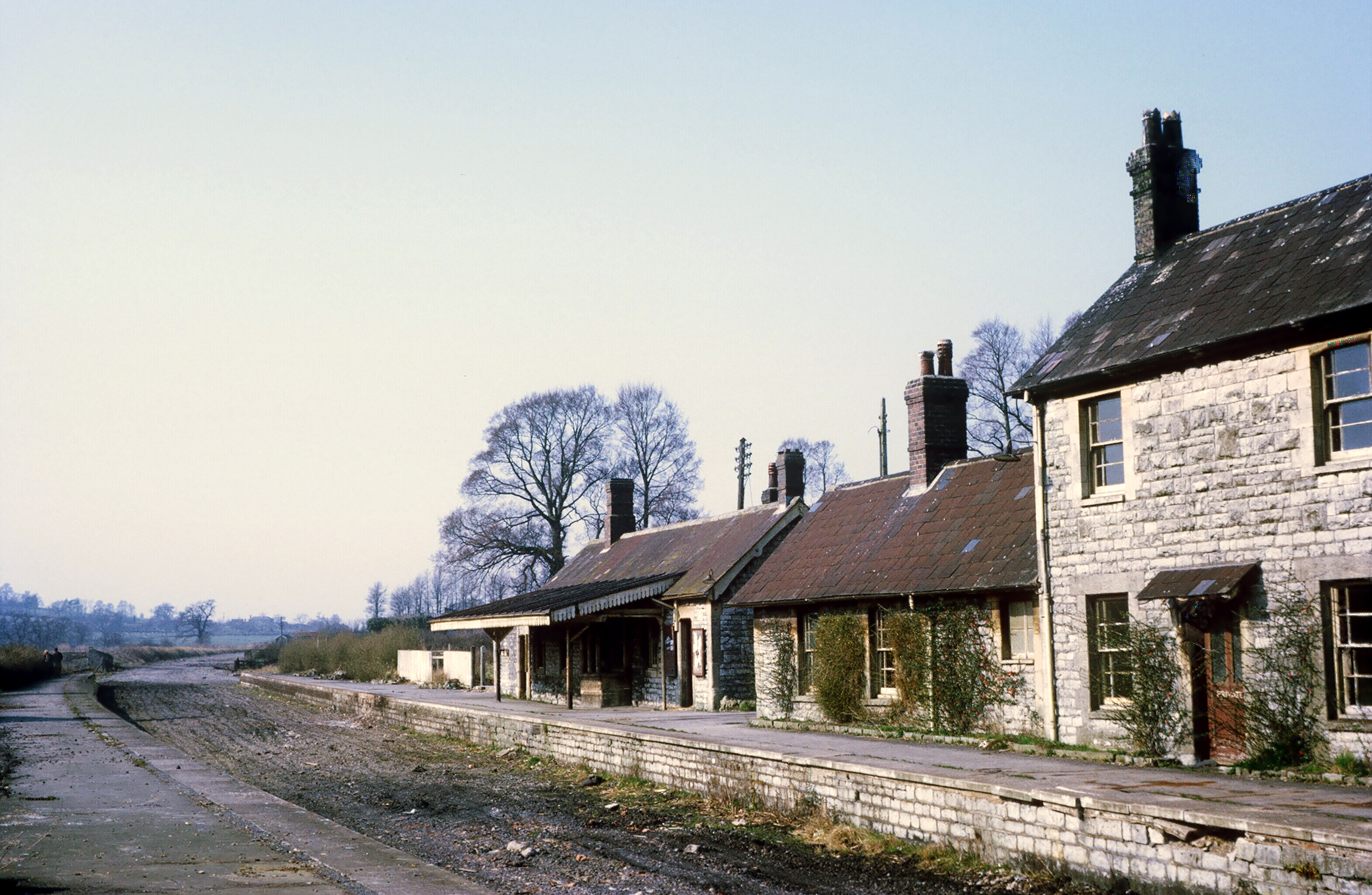
Three years after closure

Today the residual station buildings are private homes, with the former station track bed forming their gardens. The former goods yard is a small industrial estate, while the station hotel was renamed again as The Natterjack in the 1970s.

Preceding station	Historical railways	Following station
Cole (For Bruton); Line and station closed	Somerset & Dorset Joint Railway; LSWR and Midland Railways; Highbridge Branch	Pylle; Line and station closed
Cole (For Bruton); Line and station closed	Somerset & Dorset Joint Railway; LSWR and Midland Railway	Evercreech New; Line and station closed
