= Writhlington =

Village in Somerset, England

Coordinates: 51.2890°N 2.4327°W

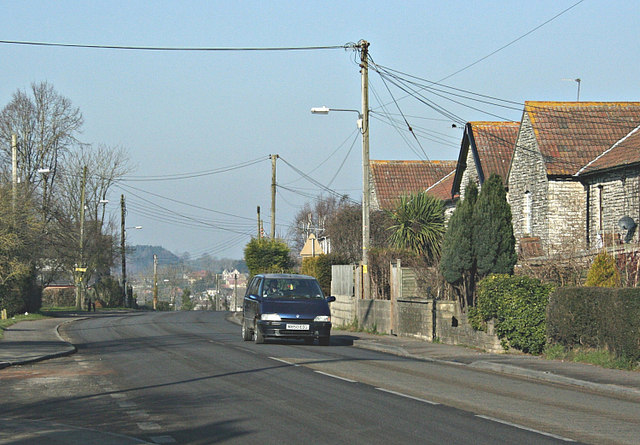
- Houses at the top of the hill in Writhlington

- Location within Somerset
- OS grid reference: ST699545
- Civil parish: Radstock
- Unitary authority: Bath and North East Somerset
- Ceremonial county: Somerset
- Region: South West
- Country: England
- Sovereign state: United Kingdom
- Post town: RADSTOCK
- Postcode district: BA3
- Dialling code: 01761
- Police: Avon and Somerset
- Fire: Avon
- Ambulance: South Western
- UK Parliament: Frome and East Somerset

Writhlington is a suburb of Radstock and 6 miles (10 km) north-west of Frome, in the Bath and North East Somerset district of Somerset, England.

== History ==
The ancient parish of Writhlington was part of the Kilmersdon Hundred. In 1931 the parish had a population of 551. On 1 April 1933 the parish was abolished to form Norton Radstock, part also went to Kilmersdon.

== Church ==
The parish church was dedicated to St Mary Magdalene. It has been designated by English Heritage as a Grade II listed building. The church has since been converted to a private residence, whose owners have included the actor Dai Bradley. The old rectory which accompanies it dates from the 18th century. There is also a Methodist church dating from the early 20th century.

== Coal mining ==
Coal pits within the village were part of the Somerset coalfield and the site is now Writhlington Site of Special Scientific Interest, which includes 3,000 tons of Upper Carboniferous spoil from which more than 1,400 insect fossil specimens have been recovered, including Phalangiotarbida, and Graeophonus. and the world's earliest known Damselfly, It is a Geological Conservation — Protected Site.

In 1896 they were owned by Writhlington, Huish and Foxcote Colliery Co., and by 1908 this had been changed to Writhlington Collieries Co. Ltd. The Upper and Lower Writhlington, Huish & Foxcote were all merged into one colliery. Most of the output went to Portishead power station.

The village was on a branch of the proposed route of the Somerset Coal Canal, however this was converted into a tramway in 1815.

== Geology ==
The base of the Kilmersdon Valley is of alluvium deposits. Above this on both sides of all of the valleys is a band of shales and clays from the Penarth Group. These rocks are from the Triassic period. The majority of the remaining upland in this area is Lias Limestone (white and blue) while the very highest part above 130 m, south of Haydon, is a small outcrop of Inferior Oolitic Limestone. All these limestones are from the Jurassic period. The steepest slopes of both the Kilmersdon and Snail's Bottom Valleys have frequently slipped. Below all of the area is the coal-bearing Carboniferous strata. Haydon is an outlier of Radstock and was built to house the miners for the local pit. The disused railway line and inclined railway at Haydon form important elements within the Kilmersdon valley east of Haydon. The modern landscape has a less maintained and 'rougher' character and texture than neighbouring agricultural areas. This is caused in the main by the remnants of the coal industry and its infrastructure and changes in agricultural management. The disturbance caused by coal mining and the railways and the subsequent ending of mining and disuse of the railways has created valuable habitats of nature conservation interest.

== Sport ==
Andy Robinson taught mathematics, Physical Education and Rugby at Writhlington School.

The village cricket team plays in the North Somerset Cricket League.
