= Hemington, Somerset =

Village in Somerset, England

Coordinates: 51.27729°N 2.39133°W

Hemington
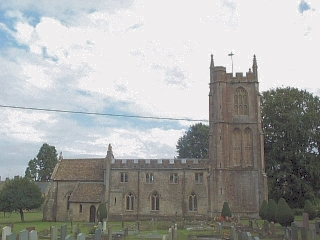
- Church of St Mary, Hemington

- Location within Somerset
- Population: 640 (2011)
- OS grid reference: ST728532
- Unitary authority: Somerset Council
- Ceremonial county: Somerset
- Region: South West
- Country: England
- Sovereign state: United Kingdom
- Post town: RADSTOCK
- Postcode district: BA3
- Dialling code: 01373
- Police: Avon and Somerset
- Fire: Devon and Somerset
- Ambulance: South Western
- UK Parliament: Frome and East Somerset

Hemington is a village and civil parish 5.5 miles (8.9 km) north west of Frome, in the county of Somerset, England. It is located just off the A366 between Trowbridge and Radstock. The parish includes the villages of Hardington, Faulkland and Foxcote.

== History ==
The name of the parish means "the settlement of Hemmi's (or Hemma's) people".

The parishes of Hardington and Hemington were part of the Kilmersdon Hundred, while Foxcote was part of the Wellow Hundred.

On the village green in Faulkland and at several other sites throughout the village there are standing stones of unknown origin. Between two of the stones are the 16th or 17th-century village stocks. There are two pubs in the village: The Faulkland Inn, which dates from the early 19th century, and the historic Tuckers Grave which was probably built in the early 18th century and is one of the few remaining 'Parlour' pubs with no bar counter.

Foxcote was on the route of the Somerset and Dorset Railway and was the site, on 7 August 1876, of a collision between the Wimborne to Bath train and one travelling from Bath to Radstock. The crash, known as the Radstock rail accident, left 13 people killed and 51 injured. It is just off the route of NCR 24, the Colliers Way, which is named for the Somerset coalfield which included a colliery at Foxcote from 1853 to 1931. In 1896 they were owned by Writhlington, Huish and Foxcote Colliery Co., and by 1908 this had been changed to Writhlington Collieries Co. Ltd. The Upper and Lower Writhlington, Huish & Foxcote were later all merged into one colliery.

In the late 19th century a local quarry owner, John Turner of Faulkland, took out a lawsuit against his neighbour Hedworth Jolliffe, 2nd Baron Hylton who owned Ammerdown House in Kilmersdon. When Turner lost he erected a tower of around 180 feet (55 m) high to rival the column at Ammerdown, with a dance hall and tea garden at the base. When Turner died in 1894, Lord Hylton bought the structure to demolish it. The base and dance hall were converted into workers' cottages and eventually demolished in 1969.

=== Manor of Hardington ===
John VI Bampfield (fl. 14th century), of Poltimore, Devon, married Agnes Pederton, daughter and heiress of John Pederton of Hardington, Somerset, by his wife Cecilia Turney, daughter and heiress of John Turney. By his wife he had two sons, the eldest Sir William Bampfield of Poltimore, the youngest Peter Bampfield of Hardington, Somerset, whose ultimate male descendant was Warwick Bampfield (1623–1695), of Hardington, whose heir was Sir Coplestone Warwick Bampfylde, 3rd Baronet (c. 1689–1727) of Poltimore.

== Governance ==
The parish council has responsibility for local issues, including setting an annual precept (local rate) to cover the council's operating costs and producing annual accounts for public scrutiny. The parish council evaluates local planning applications and works with the local police, district council officers, and neighbourhood watch groups on matters of crime, security, and traffic. The parish council's role also includes initiating projects for the maintenance and repair of parish facilities, as well as consulting with the district council on the maintenance, repair, and improvement of highways, drainage, footpaths, public transport, and street cleaning. Conservation matters (including trees and listed buildings) and environmental issues are also the responsibility of the council.

For local government purposes, since 1 April 2023, the parish comes under the unitary authority of Somerset Council. Prior to this, it was part of the non-metropolitan district of Mendip (established under the Local Government Act 1972). It was part of Frome Rural District before 1974.

It is also part of the Frome and East Somerset county constituency represented in the House of Commons of the Parliament of the United Kingdom. It elects one Member of Parliament (MP) by the first past the post system of election.

== Religious sites ==
Foxcote church, dedicated to St James the Less, dates from the early 18th century and incorporates a 15th-century turret. It has been designated by English Heritage as a Grade II* listed building.

The parish Church of St Mary dates from the 12th century and is Grade I listed.

The Church of St. Mary at Hardington in the parish of Hemington, Somerset, England dates from the 11th century and has been designated as a Grade I listed building. It is no longer used as a church and is in the care of The Churches Conservation Trust.

The Wesleyan Chapel at Faulkland has been designated by English Heritage as a Grade II listed building.

== See also ==
- Jonathan Kestenbaum, Baron Kestenbaum of Foxcote (born 1959), former chief operating officer of investment trust RIT Capital Partners, and a Labour member of the House of Lords
