= Holcombe, Somerset =

Village and civil parish in Somerset, England

Coordinates: 51.2437°N 2.4670°W

Holcombe
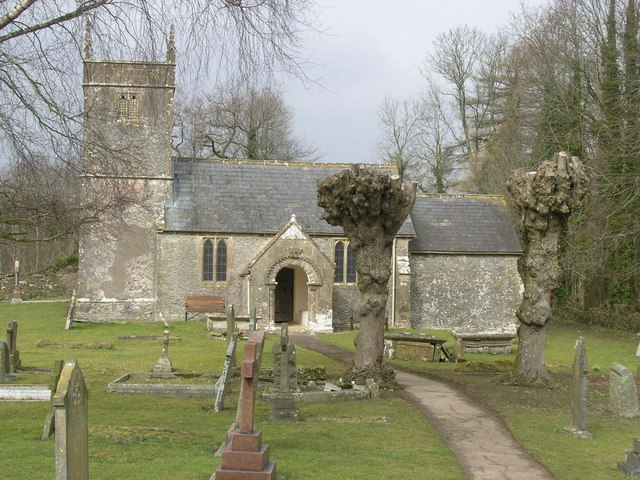
- The old St Andrew's church, Holcombe

- Location within Somerset
- Population: 947 (2011)
- OS grid reference: ST675495
- Unitary authority: Somerset Council
- Ceremonial county: Somerset
- Region: South West
- Country: England
- Sovereign state: United Kingdom
- Post town: RADSTOCK
- Postcode district: BA3
- Dialling code: 01761
- Police: Avon and Somerset
- Fire: Devon and Somerset
- Ambulance: South Western
- UK Parliament: Frome and East Somerset

Holcombe is a small village and civil parish (population 936) in the county of Somerset, England. The parish contains the hamlets of Barlake and Edford. It is within easy commuting distance of both Bristol and Bath.

== History ==
Its place name is derived from the Old English Hol, meaning deep or hollow and cumb meaning valley.

The parish of Holcombe was part of the Kilmersdon Hundred.

The original medieval village was buried at the time of the Great Plague of London, and the old parish church, which survives, is surrounded by the mounds that bear testimony to this burial. It is suggested that the rhyme 'Ring a Ring o' Roses' began there as a result. An alternative explanation relates to the drowning of five children from the village in an icy pond in 1899.

The village has two pubs: The Duke of Cumberland, which can be found at the bottom of the village's hill which in 2020 was redeveloped into a combination of a pub and a farm shop, and the Holcombe Inn, which recently changed its name from The Ring O' Roses to its original 1960s name. It was named as a reminder of the plague that previously destroyed the village.

Holcombe originally had four churches, two of which are still in use. One of these original churches, the Methodist Chapel has been converted into three private dwellings.

Holcombe was the site of several mines on the Somerset coalfield; however these are all now closed. The importance of Somerset coalfield caused a branch canal from the main Dorset and Somerset Canal to be proposed, and construction began in 1786 following a route from Coleford, Somerset to Nettlebridge through Holcombe. This intersected the main road through Holcombe around 75 m (80 yd) north of the Duke of Cumberland inn. However, in 1803, the entire canal was abandoned without being completed. There is limited evidence of the canal remaining, including some masonry such as bridges and retaining walls near the Duke of Cumberland. This planned route can be followed through to Coleford along a public footpath for most of the route from nearby Ham.

Holcombe quarry is no longer in use and has been fenced off. However, although it is highly dangerous and despite various warnings, it remains a popular destination for teenagers to go swimming and "tombstoning" during the summer months, which have resulted in personal injuries and some deaths. Since 2019, two of the larger quarries, including Cooks Wood, have been under redevelopment as a luxury holiday property development, under the name of 'Cooks Wood', as part of this development any public access to the quarries are now limited to just the public footpath.

== Governance ==
The parish council has responsibility for local issues, including setting an annual precept (local rate) to cover the council’s operating costs and producing annual accounts for public scrutiny. The parish council evaluates local planning applications and works with the local police, district council officers, and neighbourhood watch groups on matters of crime, security, and traffic. The parish council's role also includes initiating projects for the maintenance and repair of parish facilities, as well as consulting with the district council on the maintenance, repair, and improvement of highways, drainage, footpaths, public transport, and street cleaning. Conservation matters (including trees and listed buildings) and environmental issues are also the responsibility of the council.

For local government purposes, since 1 April 2023, the parish comes under the unitary authority of Somerset Council. Prior to this, it was part of the non-metropolitan district of Mendip (established under the Local Government Act 1972). It was part of Shepton Mallet Rural District before 1974.

It is also part of the Frome and East Somerset county constituency represented in the House of Commons of the Parliament of the United Kingdom. It elects one Member of Parliament (MP) by the first past the post system of election.

== Religious sites ==
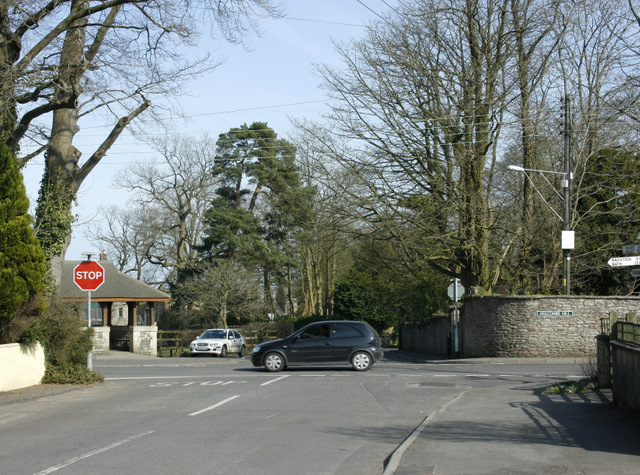
Crossroads

The old Church of St. Andrew has late Saxon-early Norman origins and was rebuilt in the 16th century. The church is in the care of the Churches Conservation Trust. It is in general now closed; but services are held at Christmas and on the first Sunday of June, July and August. The church was used as a location in the BBC production of Poldark. The former priest's house later became a coach house to Holcombe House, and is Grade II listed.

== Notable residents ==
For a time Scott of the Antarctic's parents lived at and ran the brewery in Holcombe. Members of his family are buried in a family grave, and there is a memorial accrediting Scott's interment in the Antarctic, in the Holcombe old church.

Bob Braham, a decorated airman, was born in the village.
