= Haydon, Somerset =

Village in Somerset, England

Coordinates: 51.283°N 2.451°W

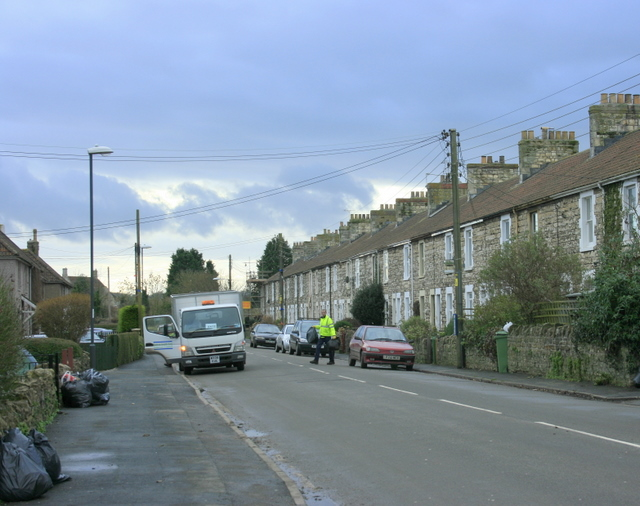
The main road through Haydon

Haydon is a village lying between Radstock and Kilmersdon in Somerset, England. It is 1 mile (1.6 km) south-west of Radstock and 1.5 miles (2.4 km) north-east of Kilmersdon.

== History ==
Haydon was built in the nineteenth century to house miners from the local pit in the Somerset Coalfield, which closed in 1973.

The winding wheel from the pit is now displayed outside Radstock Museum.

== Governance ==
Haydon forms part of the Frome and East Somerset constituency, which elects a Member of Parliament to the House of Commons of the Parliament of the United Kingdom. It was also part of the South West England constituency of the European Parliament prior to Britain leaving the European Union in January 2020.

Almost all significant local government functions are carried out by Bath and North East Somerset, a unitary authority.
