= Radstock Museum =

Museum in Radstock, Somerset, UK

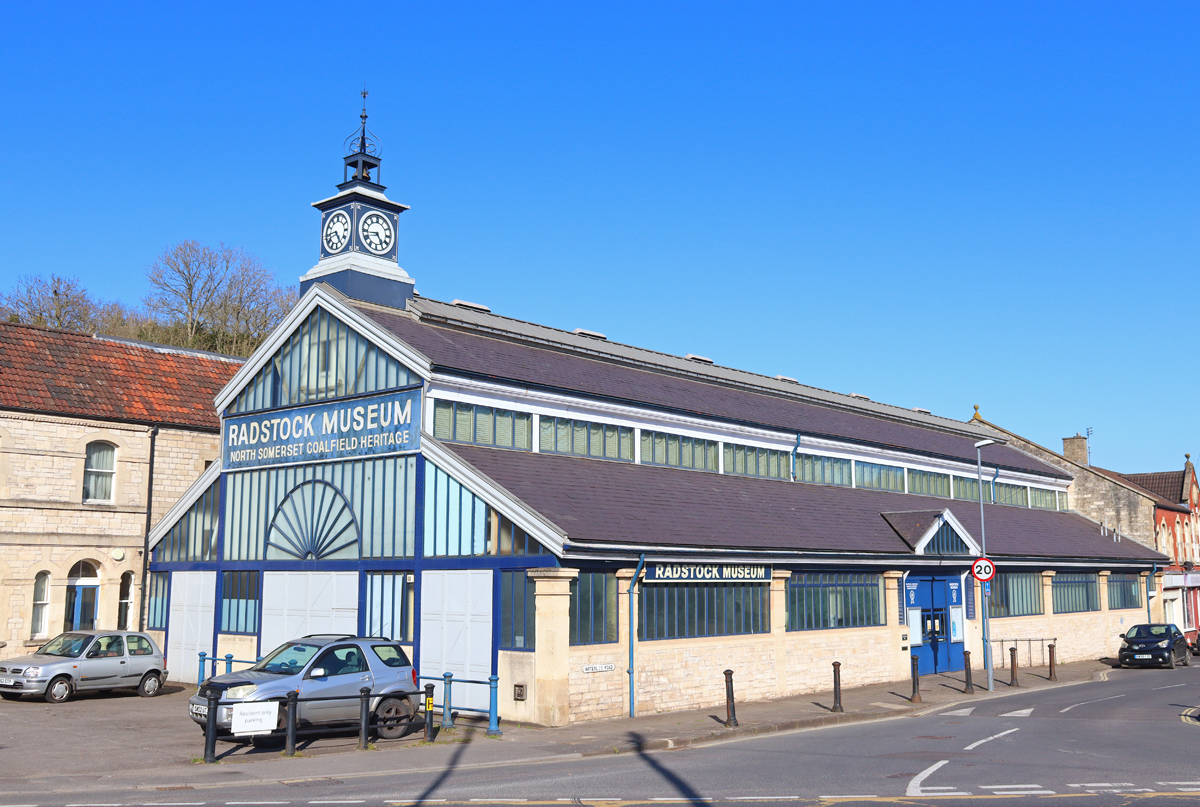

- Location within Somerset and the United Kingdom
- Established: 1989
- Location: Market Hall, Radstock, Somerset, England
- Coordinates: 51.293557°N 2.448552°W
- Website: Radstock Museum

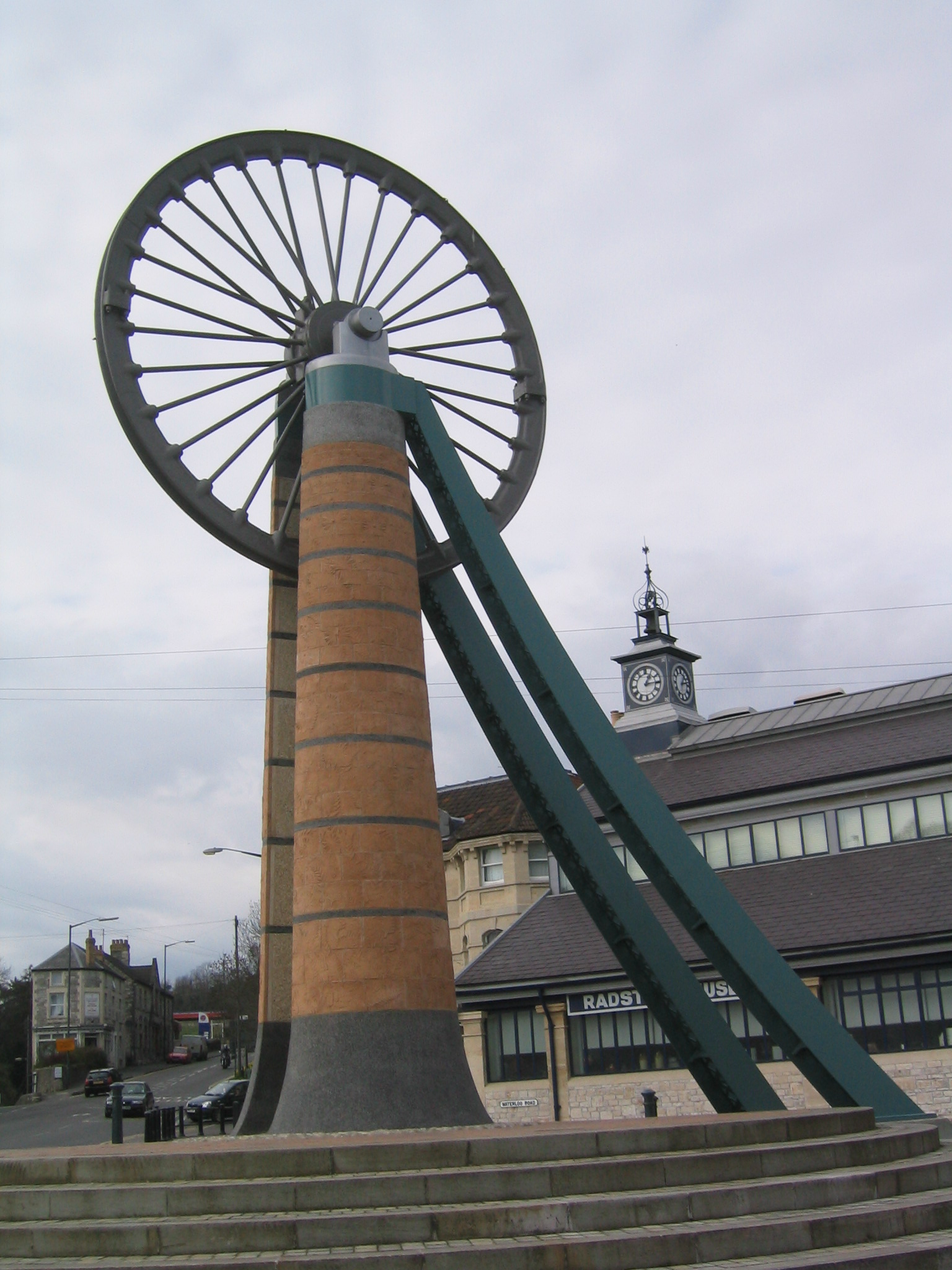
The old coal mining wheel, now featured in the centre of Radstock, in front of the Radstock Museum

Radstock Museum in Radstock, Somerset, England has a range of exhibits which offer an insight into North Somerset life since the nineteenth century.

== History ==
The museum was originally opened in 1989 in barns in Haydon. The museum moved to its current site in the restored and converted Victorian Market Hall, a grade II listed building dating from 1897 which was opened on 10 July 1999 by Loyd Grossman.

== Exhibits ==
Many of the exhibits relate to the now disused local Somerset Coalfield and geology. The geology exhibits including fossils found locally particularly relate to the work of William Smith, who was known as "the Father of English Geology", and spent much of his early career in the local area.

Other areas include aspects of local history including home life, schools and shops, and industries such as agriculture, a forge, and a printers.

Artefacts and memorabilia of the Somerset Coal Canal, Somerset and Dorset and Great Western Railways are also on display.

Religious life in the area is represented with exhibits related to John Wesley who founded Methodism and John Skinner who, as well as being rector of Camerton was also an archaeologist and antiquarian.
