= Writhlington SSSI =

Geological Site of Special Scientific Interest in Somerset, England

Writhlington
- Site of Special Scientific Interest
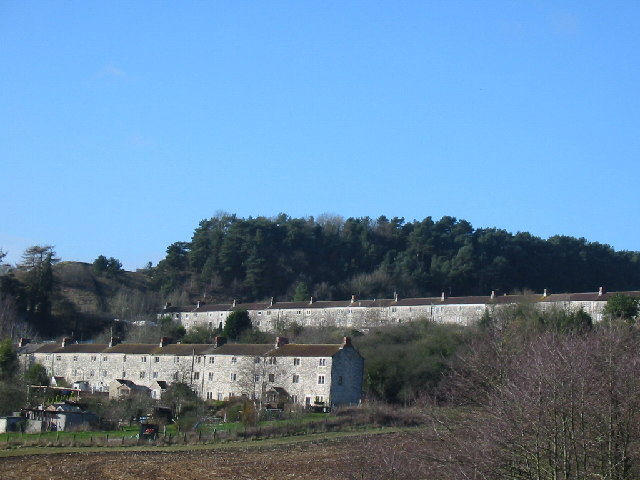

- Location within Somerset
- Location of Writhlington.
- Area of search: Avon
- Grid reference: ST703553
- Coordinates: 51.29605°N 2.42735°W
- Interest: Geological
- Area: 0.5 hectares (0.0050 km^{2}; 0.0019 sq mi)
- Notification date: 1992

Writhlington SSSI (grid reference ST703553) is a 0.5 hectare geological Site of Special Scientific Interest near the town of Radstock, Bath and North East Somerset, notified in 1992.

This is the site of old mine workings on the Somerset coalfield, including 3,000 tons of Upper Carboniferous spoil from which more than 1,400 insect fossil specimens have been recovered, including the world's earliest known Damselfly. It is a Geological Conservation Review Site, because it has yielded the largest ever collection of Carboniferous insects in Britain. The commonest forms belong to the order Blattodea (cockroaches) and include the extinct families Archimylacris and Mymarommatidae. Protorthoptera and Palaeodictyoptera also occur. Frequent chelicerates (arthropods) include trace and body fossils of xiphosurid merostomes and arachnids, including Phalangiotarbida and Trigonotarbida and also true spiders (Araneida). Rare myriapods (millipedes) and occasional conchostracan crustaceans (clam-shrimps) also occur.
