= St Mary's Church, Hemington =

Church in Somerset, England

Church of St Mary
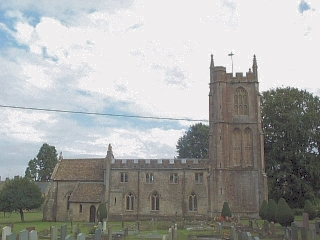

- Location within Somerset

General information
- Location: Hemington, Somerset, England
- Coordinates: 51.2757°N 2.3922°W
- Completed: 12th century

St. Mary's Hemington is an Anglican church in Hemington, Somerset, England. The Norman church underwent major renovation in the 14th, 15th, 17th and 19th centuries. The south aisle and nave are the oldest part dating from the 1340s. The tower was built between 1480 and 1500. The 19th-century work is attributed to the office of Sir George Gilbert Scott.

The Anglican parish is part of the benefice of Hardington Vale in the archdeaconry of Wells. Services are held every week.

== See also ==
- List of Grade I listed buildings in Mendip
- List of towers in Somerset
- List of ecclesiastical parishes in the Diocese of Bath and Wells
