= Writhlington School =

Location
- Knobsbury Lane; Writhlington; Somerset, BA3 3NQ; England; 51.2874°N 2.4308°W

Information
- Type: Academy
- Established: 2011
- School district: Radstock
- Trust: Midsomer Norton Schools Partnership
- Department for Education URN: 137548 Tables
- Ofsted: Reports
- Head teacher: Duncan Powell
- Gender: Mixed
- Age: 11 to 18
- Enrolment: 923 pupils
- Capacity: 923
- Website: https://www.writhlington.org.uk/

Writhlington School is a secondary school for pupils aged 11–18 in Writhlington, Bath and North East Somerset, England. It is the main secondary school in the Radstock area, providing further education to local children and some pupils who live outside the catchment area. The school became an academy in October 2011.

== Background ==
Around 70% of year 11 pupils apply to attend sixth form. The school is notable for its orchid project, which has won numerous awards including a gold medal at the 2009 Chelsea Flower Show. The school has also won awards in business with their enterprise companies. It is one of the few state schools to have its own non-compulsory Combined Cadet Force (CCF) with over 150 pupils involved from years 9 to 13.

A turf-cutting ceremony was held at the start of a major rebuilding programme funded by the Department for Children, Schools and Families (DCSF) as part of the Building Schools for the Future programme. It is designed to increase the capacity of the school to 1,300+ pupils and was due for completion in January 2010. The school moved into the new building in April 2010. The British Council for School Environments, an education charity which pioneers and supports the creation of effective and efficient learning environments, declared the Writhlington School project as Winner of the Excellence in Design for Teaching and Learning: Secondary New Build and Winner of the Badge in Excellence in Design for Virtual Learning.

The school was rated "good" in every category by Ofsted in 2023, improving on its 2017 "Needs Improvement" rating in every category.

== Notable alumni ==
- Corey Walkes, British Athlete
- Ashley Barnes, footballer
- Francis Bourgeois, trainspotter and social media personality
- David Hempleman-Adams, explorer
- Jahméne Douglas, singer
- Maisie Williams, actress

== Notable teacher ==
- Andy Robinson, ex Bath and England rugby union flanker, ex England and Scotland head coach, and current director of rugby for Bristol.
