= Alick Grant =

English footballer

Personal information
- Full name: Alick Grant
- Date of birth: 11 August 1916
- Place of birth: Radstock, England
- Date of death: 2008 (aged 91–92)
- Position: Goalkeeper

Senior career*
| Years | Team | Apps | (Gls) |
| 1937 | Sheffield United | | |
| 1937–1938 | Bury | 0 | (0) |
| 1938–1939 | Aldershot | 5 | (0) |
| 1946–1947 | Leicester City | 2 | (0) |
| 1947–1948 | Derby County | 12 | (0) |
| 1948–1949 | Newport County | 20 | (0) |
| 1949 | Leeds United | 0 | (0) |
| 1949–1950 | York City | 3 | (0) |
- Worksop Town
- * Club domestic league appearances and goals

Alick Grant (11 August 1916 – 2008) was an English footballer who played in the Football League for Aldershot, Leicester City, Derby County, Newport County and York City.
