= Fosse Way School =

Special school in Somerset, England

Coordinates: 51.2831°N 2.4718°W

Location
- Longfellow Road; Radstock, Somerset, BA3 3AL; England

Information
- Type: Special school
- Department for Education URN: 137493 Tables
- Ofsted: Reports
- Head teacher: Fiona Skinner
- Gender: Coeducational
- Age: 3 to 19
- Enrollment: 226 (March 2025)
- Website: https://www.fossewayschool.co.uk

Fosse Way School is an all-through special school in the town of Radstock in Somerset, England. The school converted to academy status in September 2011, and joined The Partnership Trust in 2013.

The school offers residential places for autistic children at the on-site Fosse Way House. This provision is set to end in September 2025 due to Bath and North East Somerset Council ceasing to fund it.

The school is home to a special needs scout group named Fosse Way Explorer Scouts, which meets every week within school term time.

== Accolades ==
Fosse Way School earned the Widening Inclusivity in RE (WIRE) award in 2025.

== Incidents ==
Former teacher Thomas Marshall was dismissed from Fosse Way School in 2018 for using offensive language in front of students, in addition to physically harming them. While Marshall did not receive criminal charges, he was banned from teaching as a result of these incidents.
