= Hundred of Kilmersdon =

Historical Hundred of Somerset, England

Kilmersdon Hundred
- Area
- 15,400 acres (6,200 ha)
- Status: Hundred
- Subdivisions
  - Type: Parishes
  - Units: Ashwick, Babington, Buckland-Denham, Hardington, Hemington, Holcombe, Kilmersdon, Radstock, Stratton-on-the-Fosse, and Writhlington

The Hundred of Kilmersdon is one of the 40 historical Hundreds in the ceremonial county of Somerset, England, dating from before the Norman conquest during the Anglo-Saxon era although exact dates are unknown. Each hundred had a 'fyrd', which acted as the local defence force and a court which was responsible for the maintenance of the frankpledge system. They also formed a unit for the collection of taxes. The role of the hundred court was described in the Dooms (laws) of King Edgar. The name of the hundred was normally that of its meeting-place.

The Hundred of Kilmersdon consisted of the ancient parishes of: Ashwick, Babington, Buckland-Denham, Hardington, Hemington, Holcombe, Kilmersdon, Radstock, Stratton-on-the-Fosse, and Writhlington. It covered an area of 15,400 acres (6,200 ha).

The importance of the hundred courts declined from the seventeenth century. By the 19th century several different single-purpose subdivisions of counties, such as poor law unions, sanitary districts, and highway districts sprang up, filling the administrative role previously played by parishes and hundreds. Although the Hundreds have never been formally abolished, their functions ended with the establishment of county courts in 1867 and the introduction of districts by the Local Government Act 1894.
