= Coleford, Somerset =

Village and civil parish in Somerset, England

Coordinates: 51.2442°N 2.4519°W

Coleford
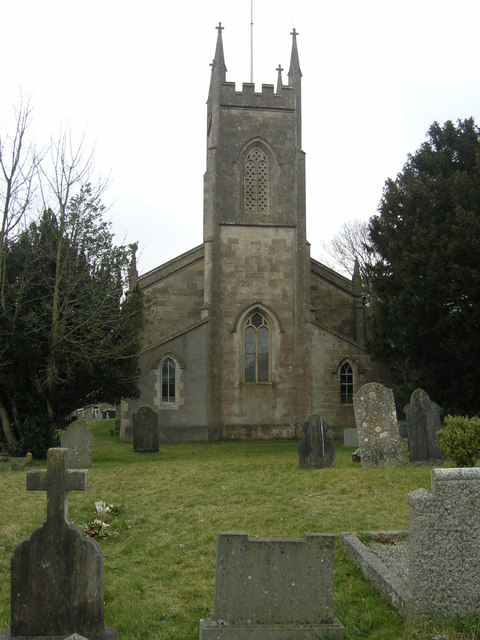
- Holy Trinity Church

- Location within Somerset
- Population: 2,313 (2011)
- OS grid reference: ST685495
- Unitary authority: Somerset Council
- Ceremonial county: Somerset
- Region: South West
- Country: England
- Sovereign state: United Kingdom
- Post town: RADSTOCK
- Postcode district: BA3
- Dialling code: 01373
- Police: Avon and Somerset
- Fire: Devon and Somerset
- Ambulance: South Western
- UK Parliament: Frome and East Somerset
- Website: Parish Council

Coleford is a village and civil parish in Somerset, England, on the Mells River in the Mendip Hills, about 5.5 miles (9 km) west of Frome. The parish includes the hamlets of Lipyeate and Newbury, and had a population of 2,313 in 2011.

== History ==
Coleford was listed in the Domesday Book of 1086 as Colford, meaning the hill ford, possibly from the Old French col and ford, or alternatively the coal ford, a ford over which charcoal was carried.

There are visible remains of an unfinished engineering project, the Dorset and Somerset Canal aqueduct, known locally as the 'Huckyduck', which was abandoned in 1803.

The village once had several coalmines as part of the now closed Somerset coalfield. Just north of Coleford there were the collieries of Newbury and Mackintosh. Mackintosh opened in 1867 but closed in 1919, due to flooding. The Natural Stone Products factory is built on the site of Newbury Colliery. This pit started around the beginning of the 19th century and closed in 1927. The Coal Barton mine was the scene of a firedamp explosion which killed nine miners in 1869.

== Governance ==
The parish council has responsibility for local issues, including setting an annual precept (local rate) to cover the council's operating costs and producing annual accounts for public scrutiny. The parish council evaluates local planning applications and works with the local police, district council officers, and neighbourhood watch groups on matters of crime, security, and traffic. The parish council's role also includes initiating projects for the maintenance and repair of parish facilities, as well as consulting with the district council on the maintenance, repair, and improvement of highways, drainage, footpaths, public transport, and street cleaning. Conservation matters (including trees and listed buildings) and environmental issues are also the responsibility of the council.

For local government purposes, since 1 April 2023, the parish comes under the unitary authority of Somerset Council. Prior to this, it was part of the non-metropolitan district of Mendip (established under the Local Government Act 1972). It was part of Frome Rural District before 1974.

It is also part of the Frome and East Somerset county constituency represented in the House of Commons of the Parliament of the United Kingdom. It elects one Member of Parliament (MP) by the first past the post system of election.

== Religious sites ==
The Anglican Parish Church of The Holy Trinity was built in 1831 by J. Sperring. The Methodist chapel is a little more recent, having been built in 1865.
