= National Cycle Route 24 =

Cycle route in the United Kingdom

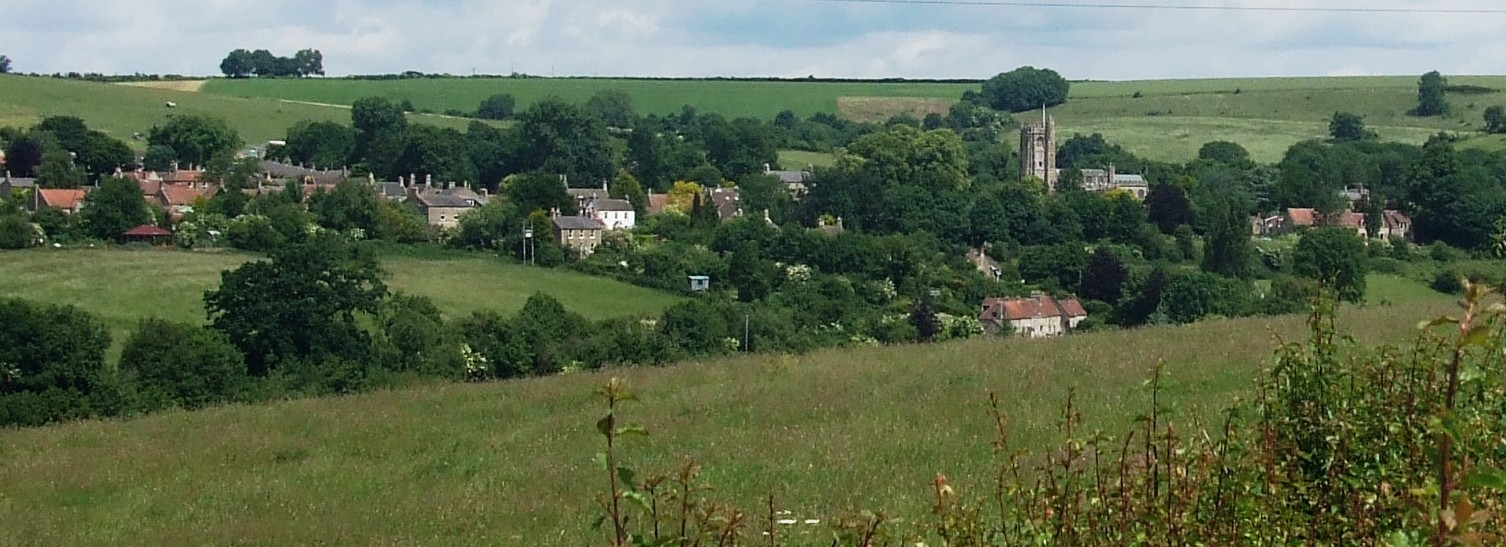
Wellow valley

National Cycle Route 24, otherwise known as the Colliers Way currently runs from Dundas Aqueduct to Frome via Radstock, although it is intended to provide a continuous cycle route from Bristol and South Wales to Southampton and Portsmouth.

== Route ==
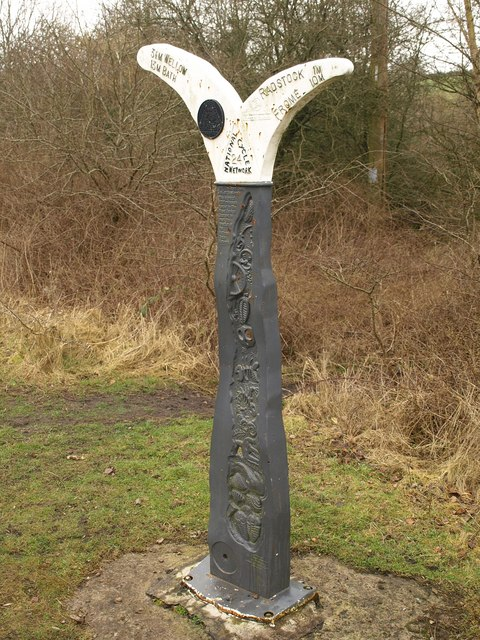
John Mills "Fossil Tree" milepost near Radstock

The route follows a mixture of low traffic roads and old railway lines serving the Somerset coalfield.

There is a visitor centre, cycle shop and cafe at Dundas Aqueduct, where this route meets NCR 4 on the Kennet & Avon Canal. From there it follows a road to Midford. The next section proceeds to Wellow and then past Peasedown St John and Foxcote to Radstock. It then follows an old railway line past Kilmersdon, Buckland Dinham and Mells to Great Elm. An interim route is then provided along lanes from Great Elm through Vallis Vale (among other less hilly routes) into Frome, as the continuous cycle path ends in Great Elm. The track running from Great Elm is still in use by the local quarries for distribution of locally mined limestone to national terminals. This factor means the cycle path legally couldn't continue along the tracks, unless they close to trains altogether. The tracks connect to the Bristol to Weymouth line, shared by passenger and freight transport.

== Linear orchard ==
The remains of apple cores thrown from train passengers have left the route with several apple trees. A programme of planting of apple and pear trees is now being undertaken to turn this into a linear orchard. A series of etched and enamelled copper plate signs which are being set into boulders along the route highlighting the names of Old English varieties.
