= Somerset Coalfield =

Coalfield in northern Somerset, England

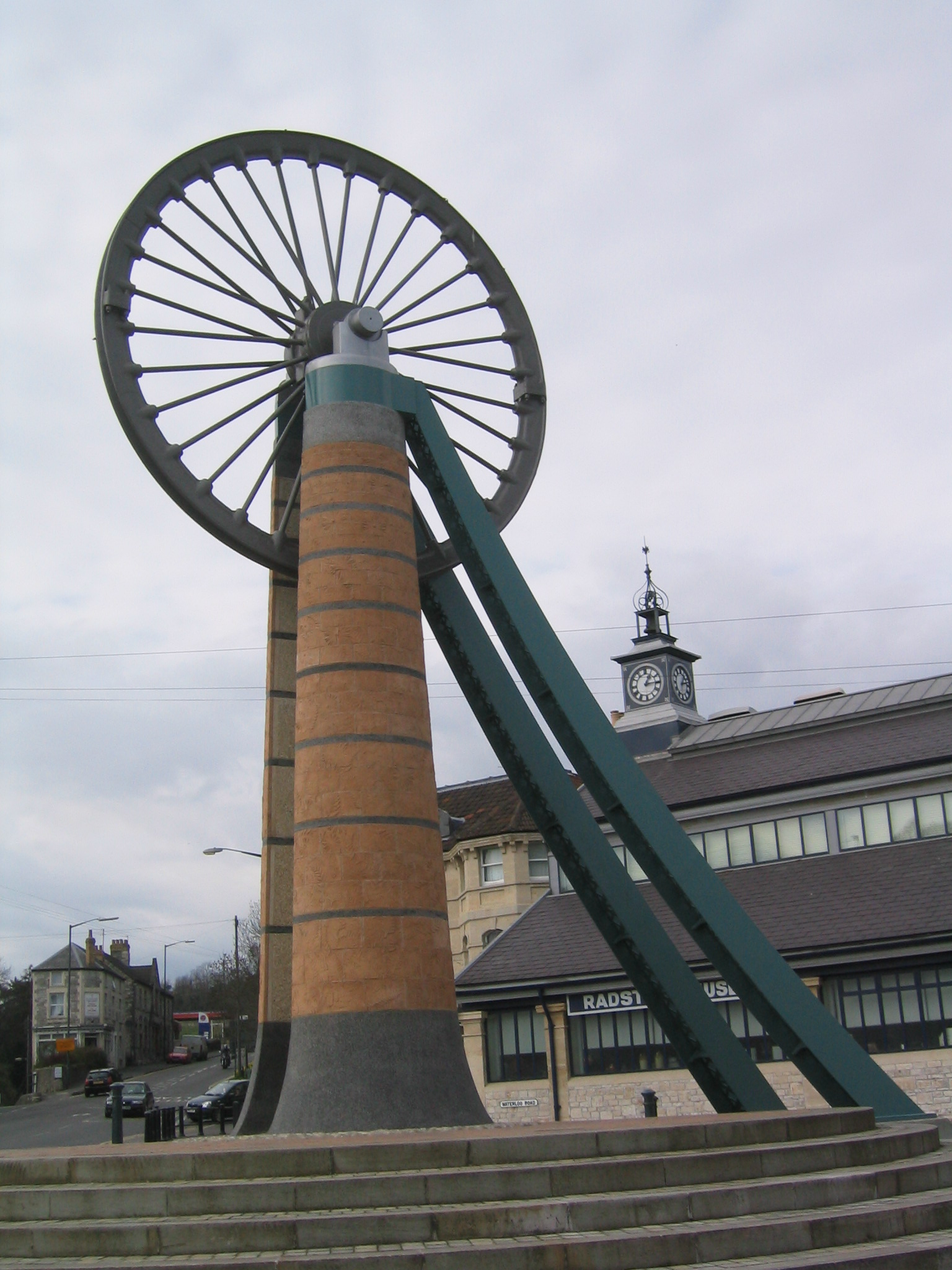
The old coal mining sheave wheel, now featured in the centre of Radstock, in front of the Radstock Museum

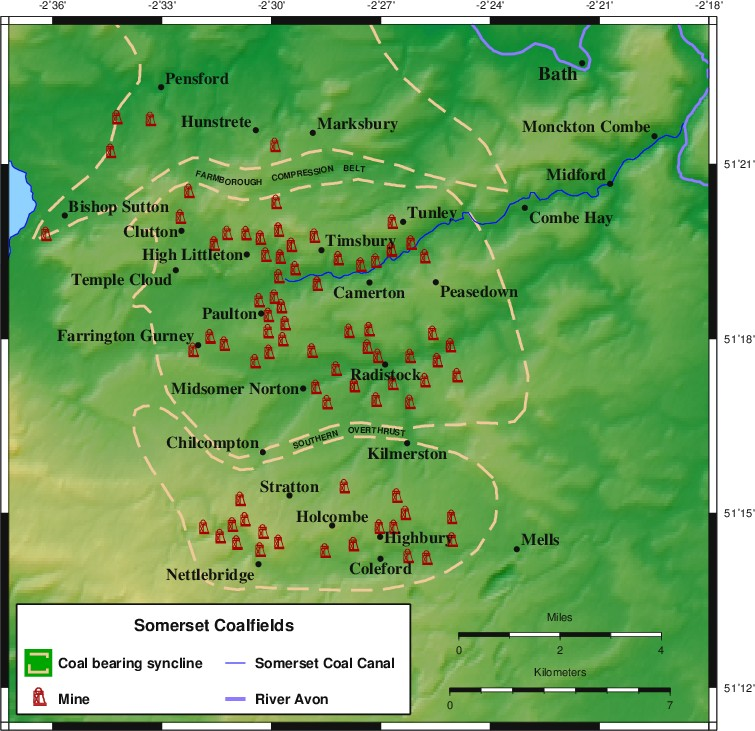
Map of the Somerset Coalfields

The Somerset Coalfield in northern Somerset, England is an area where coal was mined from the 15th century until 1973. It is part of a larger coalfield which stretched into southern Gloucestershire. The Somerset coalfield stretched from Cromhall (Gloucestershire) in the north to the Mendip Hills in the south, and from Bath in the east to Nailsea in the west – a total area of about 240 square miles (622 km^{2}). Most of the pits on the coalfield were concentrated in the Cam Brook, Wellow Brook and Nettlebridge Valleys and around Radstock and Farrington Gurney. The pits were grouped geographically, with clusters of pits close together working the same coal seams often under the same ownership. Many pits shared the trackways and tramways which connected them to the Somerset Coal Canal or railways for distribution.

The early pits were adits where coal outcropped or bell pits where coal was close to the surface. These methods were abandoned when deep seams were mined. The deepest shaft on the coalfield was at the Strap mine at Nettlebridge which reached 1,838 feet (560 m). Flooding and coal dust explosions in some mines required improved ventilation and pumping engines. Several pits closed in the 19th century as the coal was worked out. Those that survived until 1947 became part of the National Coal Board, but the expense of improving equipment and working conditions meant that these became uneconomical and the last pit closed in 1973. There is still evidence of the mine workings, with the remains of buildings, spoil heaps and tramways in the area.

== Geology ==
=== Structure ===
The Somerset Coalfield covers a total area of about 240 square miles (622 km^{2}). It consists of three synclines, informally referred to as 'coal basins'. The Pensford Syncline in the north and the Radstock Syncline in the south are separated by the east–west trending Farmborough Fault Belt. Further to the west is the smaller Nailsea Syncline. The Radstock Syncline in particular is cut by a series of east–west thrust faults and north–south trending normal faults.

=== Stratigraphy ===
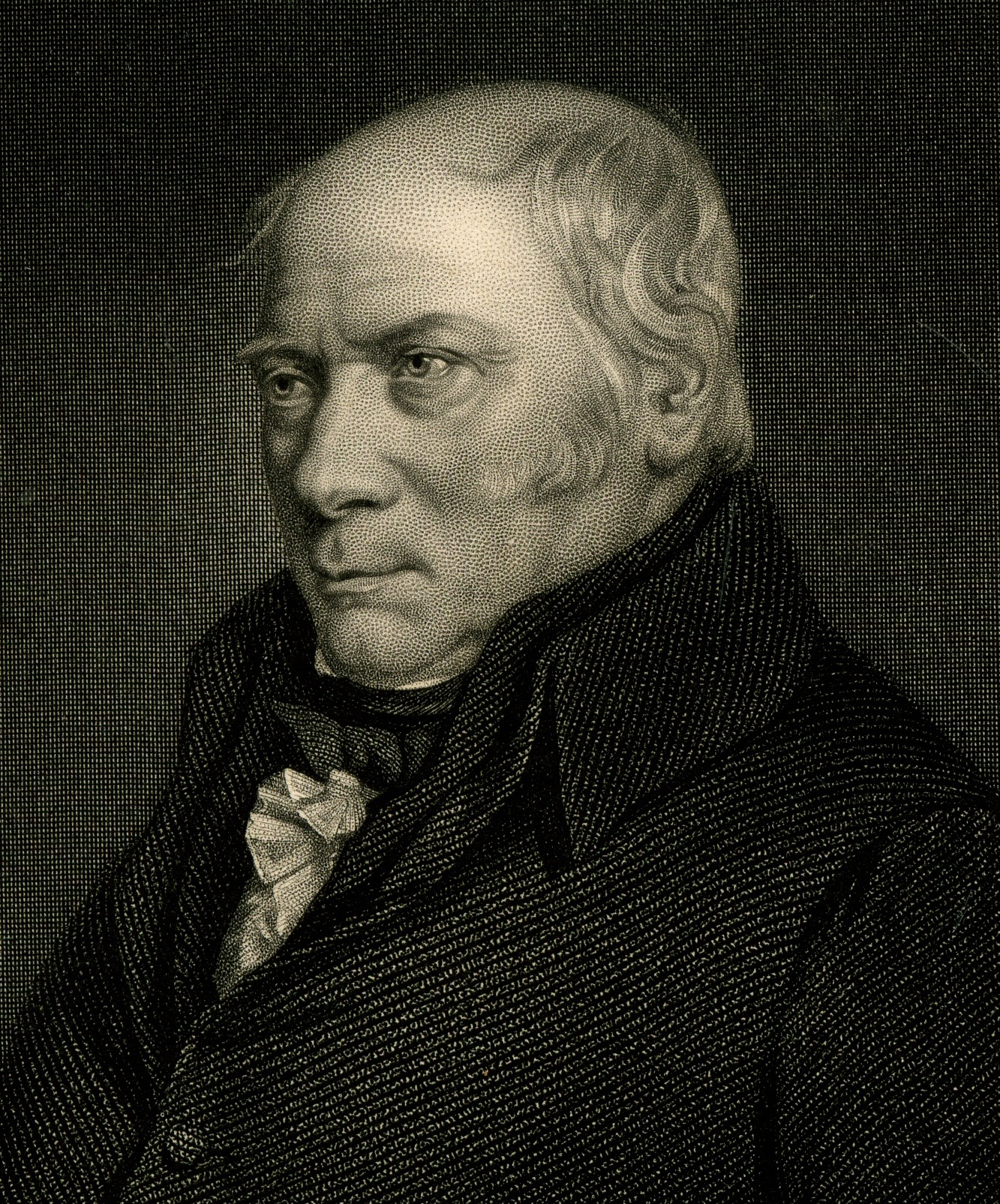
William Smith.

The Coal Measures are divided into a Lower, Middle and Upper with coal seams found within each of these divisions. Lower and Middle Coal Measures are found at depths between 500 and 5,000 feet (150 and 1,520 m). Together the Lower and Middle Coal Measures are 1,600 feet (490 m) thick with the Middle Coal Measures averaging about 500 and 5,000 feet and the Lower Coal Measures about 600 feet (180 m).

Only in the southern part of the Radstock Syncline have coals of the Lower and Middle Coal Measures been worked, mainly at the Newbury and Vobster collieries in the southeast and in the New Rock and Moorewood pits to the southwest. Whilst in the eastern part of Pensford Syncline coals of the Lower and Middle Coal Measures have been worked, at the Globe Pit in the Newton St Loe area in the 19th century. The Variscan orogeny (also responsible for the emplacement of the granitic batholiths in Cornwall, and associated tin and copper mineralisation) involved lateral compression of the rock sequence resulting in the tight folding, fracturing and faulting of the sandstone and mudstone strata, and the associated Coal Measures. Along the Radstock Slide Fault the distance between the broken ends of a coal seam can be as much as 1,500 feet (457 m). The complex geology and thin seams gained the field notoriety and three underground explosions, in 1893, 1895 and 1908 were amongst the first attributable solely to airborne coal dust.

=== William Smith ===
Exploratory surveys of the local geology were carried out by William Smith, who became known as the "father of English geology", building on work by John Strachey. Smith worked for the Stracheys who owned Sutton Court, at one of their older mines, the Mearns Pit at High Littleton. As he observed the rock strata at the pit, he realised that they were arranged in a predictable pattern that the various strata could always be found in the same relative positions and each particular stratum could be identified by the fossils it contained and the same succession of fossil groups from older to younger rocks could be found in other parts of England. Smith noticed an easterly dip in the beds of rock—small near the surface (about three degrees) then greater after the Triassic rocks which led to him a testable hypothesis, which he termed the principle of faunal succession, and he began to determine if the relationships between the strata and their characteristics were consistent throughout the country. During work as a surveyor (appointed by engineer John Rennie) for the Somerset Coal Canal Company and subsequently, he mapped the locations of geomorphological features, rock strata, and their vertical extent, and drew cross-sections and tables of what he saw and earned the name "Strata Smith".

=== Coal seams ===
The following coal seams are recognised within the coalfield. They are listed stratigraphically i.e. uppermost/youngest first. Note that not all seams are continuous across the coalfield and that correlation of some seams from one basin to another is uncertain.

Coal measures	Coal seams
Upper Coal Measures within the Pennant Sandstones	Forty Yard Coal (Pensford), Withy Mills Coal, Great Coal, Middle Coal, ?Pensford No 2 Coal, Slyving Coal, Bull Coal, Bottom Little Coal, Rock Coal, Farrington Top Coal, Top Coal, ?Streak Coal, Peacock Coal, Middle Coal, No 5 Coal, ?Bromley No 4 Coal, New Coal, No 7 Coal, No 9 Coal, Big Coal, Brights Coal, No 10 Coal (splitting into Nos 8 & 9 Coals), No 11 Coal, Rudge Coal, Temple Cloud Coal, Newbury No 2 Coal, Newbury No 1 Coal, Globe Coal, Warkey Coal
Middle Coal Measures	Garden Course Coal, Great Course Coal, Firestone Coal, Little Course Coal, Dungy Drift Coal, Coking Coal
Lower Coal Measures	Standing Coal, Main Coal, Perrink Coal, White Axen Coal

== History ==
It is believed that coal was mined in the area during Roman times and there is documentary evidence of coal being dug on the Mendips in 1305 and at Kilmersdon in 1437. By the time of Henry VIII there were coal pits at Clutton, High Littleton and Stratton-on-the-Fosse.

During the early 17th century coal was largely obtained by excavating the outcrops and driving drifts which followed the seam into the ground. Only small amounts of coal could be obtained by these methods and bell pits were also dug. These were vertical pits, with a 4-foot-diameter (1.2 m) shaft up to 60 feet (18 m) deep, which were opened out at the bottom. When all the coal that could safely be extracted from the pit had been recovered, another pit was sunk close by to intersect the seam and the waste from the second pit thrown into the first.

At the beginning of the 19th century there were about 4,000 people employed on the coalfield. The Somerset Miners' Association was founded in 1872, later becoming an area of the National Union of Mineworkers.

The uses of coal were varied. Coal was used in limekilns to produce lime for mortar used in building and by farmers to improve the soil. From 1820 coal was used to produce gas for lighting the production, smelting of iron ore at Westbury and Mells and to power steam driven woollen mills in the area. Coke was used to dry malt for the brewing industry.

=== Transport ===
Wagonloads of coal being hauled up Dunkerton Hill in the 1850s. Fanny Mayne, writing in The True Briton, complained of this unpleasant traffic, "It is a very long hill, nearly two miles long, and up it are dragged nearly all the carts, waggons, and "noddies", loaded with coal, which supply Bath and its environs with that very necessary comfort, or comfortable necessary. A sad sight is Dunkerton Hill!"

The coalfield had a relatively low population density and did not have a major coal-consuming industry nearby. In the pre-turnpike era, the roads serving the coalfield were unsuited to moving coal. Bulley notes "The problem ... was rendered far worse by the state of the roads in Somerset, which were notorious down to the middle of the 18th century. Parishes in the area sometimes neglected or refused to repair those roads which were heavily used by coal carts. Thus in 1617 the inhabitants of Stoke St Michael ... complained that "of late by reason of many coalmines ... the highways there are much in decay and grown very founderous".

In Somerset, turnpike roads began in 1707 with the establishment of the Bath Trust, but turnpikes did not reach the coalfield until the mid-1700s. The Bristol Trust, which passed close to the western boundary of the coalfield, established in 1727 was of little importance, as Bristol was never a significant market, having its own coalfield. Turnpikes facilitated the movement of coal, and John Billingsley enthused "Nothing so much contributes to the improvement of a county as good roads. Before the establishment of turnpikes, many parts of the county were scarcely accessible. ... coal was carried on horses' backs to the distance of fifteen or twenty miles from the colliery; each horse carried about two hundred and half weight. Now one horse with a light cart will draw four hundred weight or four times more than a horse could carry. Can an insignificant toll be put in competition with this saving?"

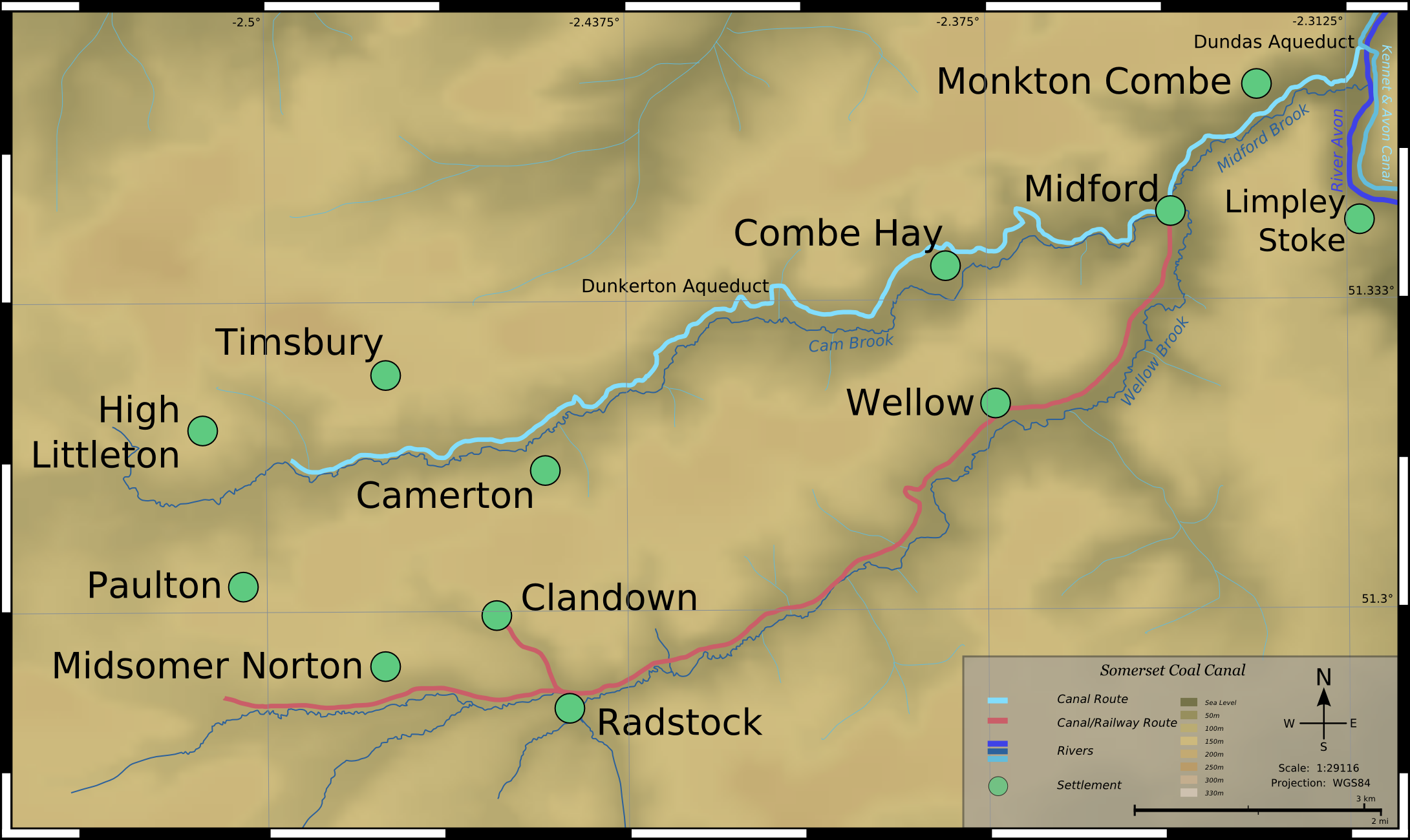
Map of the Somerset Coal Canal

Not all roads were improved, and in 1819 John Skinner observed roads "rendered bad" by the passage of coal wagons. Expansion of production was limited by access to market. Such a need implied a canal project, following Lord Middleton's dictum "Water transport is what all coal owners must aim at". There were large gains from being connected to a canal system, as stated by the Coal Commission: "At about this period (1800) the system of coal navigation was being rapidly extended, and the result was that coals were gradually finding their way into districts that could not be reached unless at great cost, by road".

A scheme for an extension of the Avon Navigation was proposed in 1766, but canals did not reach the coalfield for almost another 50 years. In 1794 coal proprietors formed a committee to construct the Somerset Coal Canal with two branches into the Cam Brook and Wellow Brook valleys, and from a junction at Midford, to join the proposed Kennet and Avon Canal at the Dundas Aqueduct near Bath. Coal was transported by the Somerset Coal Canal and later by the Bristol and North Somerset Railway and Somerset and Dorset Joint Railway, which were accessed from the pits by a series of tramways. After 1854, when the first railway line was opened, the tonnage carried by the coal canal declined rapidly.

=== Decline and closure ===
The total tonnage of coal produced by the coalfield increased throughout the 19th century, reaching a peak around 1901, when there were 79 separate collieries and production was 1.25 million tons per annum. The peak years for production were 1900 to 1920. However, decline took hold and the number of pits reduced from 30 at the beginning of the 20th century to 14 by the mid-1930s, twelve at nationalisation when the National Coal Board was created on 1 January 1947, under the Coal Industry Nationalisation Act 1946, five in 1959 and none after 1973. Despite some investment in new infrastructure, particularly at Norton Hill, thin seams made production expensive, limiting profit and investment. The conversion of Portishead power station from coal to oil and reduced national demand together with competition from more economical coalfields led to the closure of the last two pits, Kilmersdon and Writhlington, in September 1973.

=== Area today ===
Although there are still the remains of mines, disused or redeveloped buildings and a few spoil tips, most have been removed or landscaped and the area has returned to a largely rural nature. The towns and villages have some light industry, but are often commuter towns for Bath and Bristol. There are several limestone quarries, particularly in the Mendips.

The Colliers Way (NCR24) national cycle route passes landmarks associated with the coalfield, and other roads and footpaths follow tramways developed during the coal mining years. The cycleway runs from Dundas Aqueduct to Frome via Radstock, and is intended to provide part of a continuous cycle route to Southampton and Portsmouth.

Radstock Museum has exhibits that offer an insight into life in north Somerset since the 19th century. Exhibits relate to the coalfield and its geology. Artefacts and memorabilia from the Somerset Coal Canal, Somerset and Dorset and Great Western Railways are also on display.

== Pensford coal basin ==
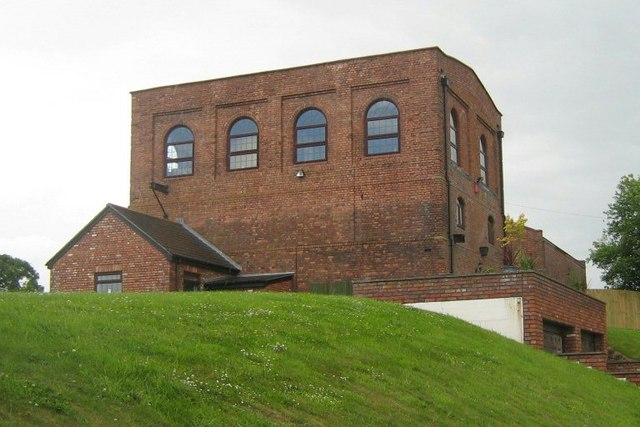
The Pensford Colliery winding house after conversion.

The Pensford coal basin is in the northern part of the coalfield around Bishop Sutton, Pensford, Stanton Drew, Farmborough and Hunstrete. At least one pit was operating near Bishop Sutton before 1719. Four bell pits in Bishop Sutton were marked on field tithe No 1409, and four shaft pits on field tithe No 1428, but were no longer working by 1824.

The Old Pit at Bishop Sutton, which was also known as Sutton Top Pit or Upper Sutton Pit was dug before 1799 and owned by Lieutenant Henry Fisher, who sold it in 1821 to Robert Blinman Dowling. After Dowling's death in 1852 the Old Pit was sold to Mr T.T. Hawkes, but he defaulted on the payments and it was sold in 1853 to William Rees-Mogg (ancestor of journalist William Rees-Mogg) and his associates. The shaft reached a depth of 304 feet (93 m), but the pit went out of production by 1855, when "New Pit", which had been sunk in the early 19th century but then closed, was reopened and deepened to exploit deeper seams. New Pit had two shafts of 4 feet (1.2 m) in diameter, one for winding and one for pumping. In 1896 it was owned by F. Spencer of New Rock Colliery, and in 1908 by Jesse Lovell and Sons. By 1921 the pit employed 150 men and boys and produced 10,000 tins per annum. The pit finally closed in 1929.

Pensford Colliery, which opened in 1909, had the latest equipment at the time including coal cutters. It had a red-brick winding house, pithead baths and a coal washery. Faulting made coal production expensive and it closed in 1958.

Pits of the Pensford coal basin
Colliery	Location	Coordinates	Opened	Closed	Shaft diameter (ft in (m))	Max shaft depth (ft (m))	Notes
Bishop Sutton (old)	Bishop Sutton	51.3353°N 2.5935°W	c1811	1855	?	304 (92.7)	Bought by William Rees-Mogg in 1835
Bishop Sutton (new)	Bishop Sutton	51.3353°N 2.5935°W	1855	1929	9 0 (2.7)	877 (267.3)	1896 owned by F. Spencer, New Rock Colliery, 1908 owned by J Lovell and Sons
Bromley	Pensford	51.3715°N 2.5480°W	1860	1957	4 6 (1.4)	475 (144.8)	1896 & 1908 Owned by Bromley Coal Co Ltd.
Common Wood Level	Hunstrete	51.3600°N 2.5077°W	1829	1832	?	?	No coal mined. Attempts made again in 1969 but unsuccessful
Farmborough	Farmborough	51.3430°N 2.4845°W	c1841	1847	?	1413 (430.7)	No coal mined
Pensford	Pensford	51.3625°N 2.5479°W	1909	1955	14 0 (4.3)	1494 (445.4)	
Rydon's (or Riding's)	Stanton Drew	51.3669°N 2.5796°W	1808	1833	?	312 (95)	

== Earl of Warwick's Clutton Collieries ==
The Earl of Warwick's estates included sawmills, quarries, brickworks and collieries in addition to agricultural holdings. Bell pits, around Clutton and High Littleton, were described in a survey of 1610. All were closed by 1836. The first deep mine in the parish of High Littleton was Mearns Coalworks which began in 1783. The Greyfield Coal Company did not start until 1833 and expanded after the opening of the Bristol and North Somerset Railway in 1847. Greyfield Colliery closed in 1911, and the railway in 1964. Maynard Terrace in Clutton was built to house some of the miners.

Pits of the Earl of Warwick's Clutton Collieries
Colliery	Location	Coordinates	Opened	Closed	Shaft diameter (ft in (m))	Max shaft depth (ft (m))	Notes
Burchells (sometimes spelt Burchills or Birchill's)	Clutton	51.3320°N 2.5389°W	1911 (reopened)	1921	?	148 (45.1)	
Fry's Bottom	Clutton	51.3410°N 2.5376°W	1830s	1885	9 0 (2.7)	588 (179.2)	
Greyfield	Clutton	51.3249°N 2.5159°W	1833	1911	10 0 (3)	900 (274.3)	1908 Owned by Greyfield Colliery Co. Ltd.,
Mooresland	Clutton	51.3249°N 2.5159°W	1840s	?	?	?	Output transferred to nearby Greyfield

== Paulton Basin ==
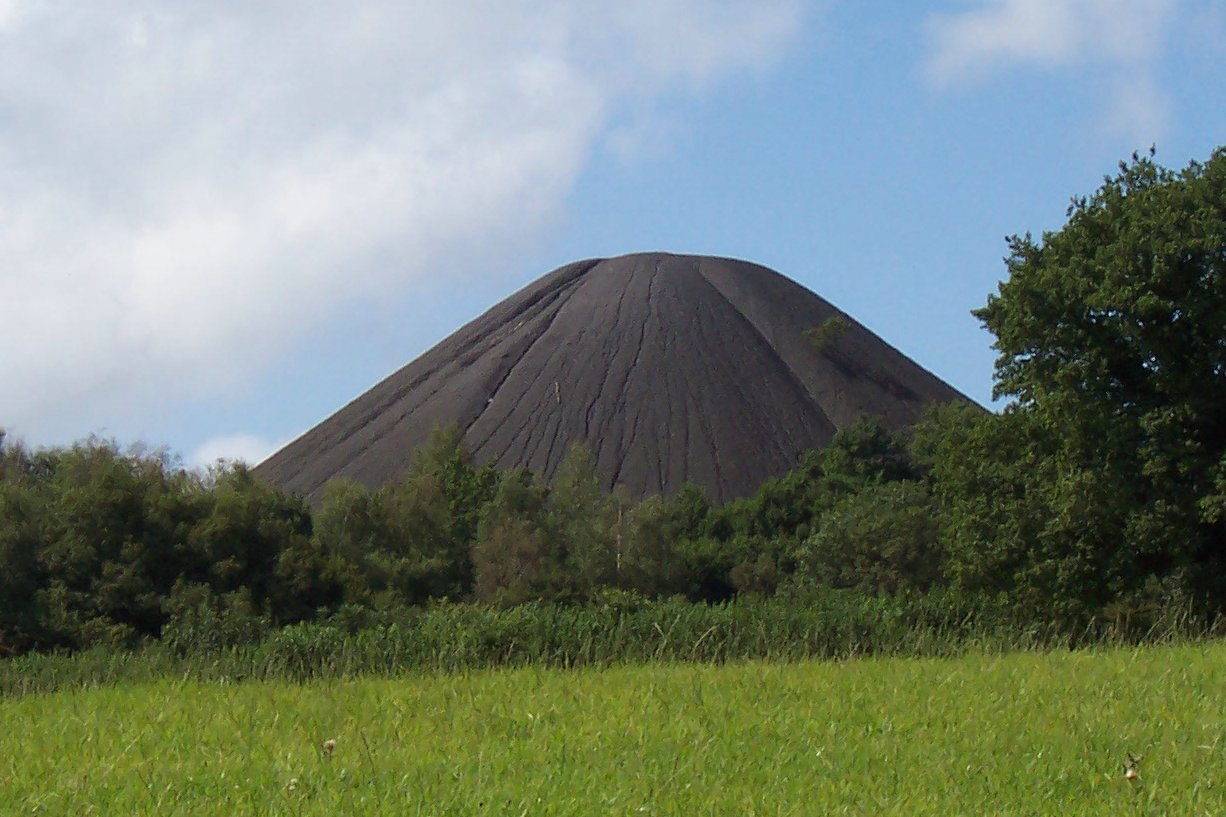
The spoil tip in Paulton, referred to locally as "The Batch"

Collieries in the Paulton basin were connected to the terminal basin of the northern branch of the Somerset Coal Canal which was the focus for tramroads that connected at least 15 collieries around Paulton, Timsbury and High Littleton. On the northern side of canal was the terminus for the tramroad which served Old Grove, Prior's, Tyning and Hayeswood pits, with a branch line to Amesbury and Mearns pits. Parts of this line were still in use in 1873, probably carrying horse-drawn wagons of coal. The southern side of the canal basin was connected to the pits at Brittens, Littlebrook, Paulton Ham, Paulton Hill, and Simons Hill by a tramway which terminated at Salisbury Colliery. In addition the Paulton Foundry used this line. The entire line was disused by 1871 as were the collieries it served.

The area has been designated as an 'area of special architectural or historic interest, the character or appearance of which it is desirable to preserve or enhance' under section 69 of the Planning (Listed Buildings and Conservation Areas) Act 1990.

Pits of the Paulton Basin
Colliery	Location	Coordinates	Opened	Closed	Shaft diameter (ft in (m))	Max shaft depth (ft (m))	Notes
Amesbury	High Littleton	51.3277°N 2.4944°W	before 1701	early 19th century	?	200 (61)	
Brewers	Paulton	51.3079°N 2.5028°W	before 1700	?	?	102 (31)	
Brittens Lower	Paulton	51.3061°N 2.4927°W	?	by 1864	?	?	
Brittens New	Paulton	51.3061°N 2.4927°W	?	by 1864	?	?	
Brombel (or Brombells, possibly Allens Paddock)	Paulton	51.3079°N 2.5028°W	before 1793	?	4 6 (1.4)	?	
Crossways	Paulton	51.3079°N 2.5028°W	?	?	5 (1.5)	144 (43.9)	
Goosard (or Gooseward or Goosewardsham or Paulton Lower Engine)	Paulton	51.3160°N 2.4957°W	1708	?	?	?	
Hayeswood	Timsbury	51.331306°N 2.492985°W	1750	1862	6 0 (1.8)	642 (195.7)	
Heighgrove (or Woody Heighgrove)	Paulton	51.3079°N 2.5028°W	1753	1819	?	?	
Littlebrook	Paulton	51.3043°N 2.5013°W	?	c1850s	5 0 (1.5)	215 (65.5)	
Mearns	High Littleton	51.3277°N 2.5001°W	1783	1824	4 6 (1.4)	279 (85)	
New Grove (possibly also Priors)	Paulton	51.3079°N 2.5028°W	1792	?	?	?	
Tyning	Timsbury	51.3268°N 2.4901°W	1766	?	?	?	Old & New Pits
Old Grove	Paulton	51.3196°N 2.487°W	?	?	4 6 (1.4)	4185 (1373)	
Paulton Bottom	Paulton	51.3079°N 2.5028°W	?	?	4 6 (1.4)	60 (18.3)	
Paulton Engine	Paulton	51.3079°N 2.5028°W	before 1750	?	9 0 (2.75)	609 (185.6)	Next to Paulton Brass and Iron foundry
Paulton Ham	Paulton	51.3079°N 2.5028°W	c1830s	1964	6 0 (1.83)	552 (168.2)	
Paulton Hill	Paulton	51.3079°N 2.5028°W	1840	1864	?	798 (243.2)	
Radford	Paulton	51.3179°N 2.4699°W	c1800	1847	6 (1.8)	1152 (351.1)	
Salisbury	Paulton	51.2998°N 2.4912°W	1792	1873	6 (1.8)	150 (45.7)	
Simons Hill (also known as Simmons Hill)	Paulton	51.3079°N 2.5028°W	1811	1844	4 6 (1.4)	672 (204.8)	
Withy Mills	Paulton	51.3178°N 2.4871°W	?1804	1877	4 6 (1.4)	804 (245)	

== Timsbury and Camerton ==
The first of the collieries around Timsbury village was sunk in 1791 and known as Conygre (Conigre in old spellings). Camerton Old Pit opened in 1781 and the shaft went down to 921 feet (281 m). It closed around circa 1898 but the shaft was then used as an airway and escape route for the New Pit, until 1930 when it was closed and capped. The New Pit was half a mile east of the Old Pit and went down to 1,818 feet (554 m). In 1928 it was joined underground to Braysdown Colliery and eventually closed in 1950.

There is very little obvious landscape evidence remaining of the previous mining activities around Clutton, Temple Cloud, High Littleton and Timsbury. However, there is a very large Batch almost in the middle of Camerton that is now a designated Local Nature Reserve. The Batch was bare, like the Paulton ones until, according to locals, the wife of the owner of Camerton Court decided to pay for it to be planted with trees to improve the view. There are small batches at Clutton, east of Radford Hill and at Greyfields, High Littleton.

Pits of the Timsbury and Camerton Collieries
Colliery	Location	Coordinates	Opened	Closed	Shaft diameter (ft in (m))	Max shaft depth (ft (m))	Notes
Camerton New	Camerton	51.3198°N 2.4484°W	1800	1950	8 0 (2.4)	1818 (554.1) (a lesser depth) before 1800	Site of a massive coal dust explosion at Camerton New in 1893 which killed two miners.
Camerton Old	Camerton	51.3207°N 2.4599°W	1781	1898	7 0 (2.1)	921 (280.7)	1896 & 1908 owned by Miss E.E. Jarrett.
Lower Conygre	Timsbury	51.3233°N 2.4671°W	1847	1916	8 0 (2.4)	1128 (343.8)	Merger of Upper and Lower pits. 1896 owned by Samborne Smith and Company. 1908 Owned by Beaumont, Kennedy and Co
Radford	Timsbury	51.3205°N 2.4857°W	?	?	6 0 (1.8)	1152 (351.1)	1906 Owned by Earl of Waldegrave
Upper Conygre	Timsbury	51.3287°N 2.4800°W	1791	1916	8 0 (2.4)	1038 (316.4)	Merger of Upper and Lower pits. 1896 owned by Samborne Smith and Company. 1908 Owned by Beaumont, Kennedy and Co. On 6 February 1895 the pit was the site of an explosion which killed seven men.

== East of Camerton ==
East of Camerton the coal is buried beneath newer rock strata, which meant that mining in the area was more difficult.

The dominant features of the valleys of the Cam and Wellow Brooks are remnants of coal mining from the 18th to the 20th centuries. In both valleys there are frequent shafts and batches together with the remains of the railway and tram lines that connected the mines to the Avon Valley. Remains of the Somersetshire Coal Canal are also significant reminders of this coal mining history in this area.

Pits to the east of Camerton
Colliery	Location	Coordinates	Opened	Closed	Shaft diameter (ft in (m))	Max shaft depth (ft (m))	Notes
Bengrove (also called Priston Old and Dunkerton)	between Camerton and Tunley	51.3243°N 2.4455°W	1764	c1774	?	506 (154.2)	
Dunkerton	Dunkerton	51.3334°N 2.4083°W	1904	1925, 1933	10 (3)	1651 (503.2)	Poor working conditions led to riots in 1908–9
Hills (also known as Priston or Dunkerton New)	Tunley	51.3315°N 2.4514°W	1792	1824	?	?	
Priston (also known as Tunley)	Tunley	51.3432°N 2.4414°W	1914	1930	8 (2.4)	750 (228.6)	Last deep mine to be opened in Somerset.

== Farrington Gurney ==
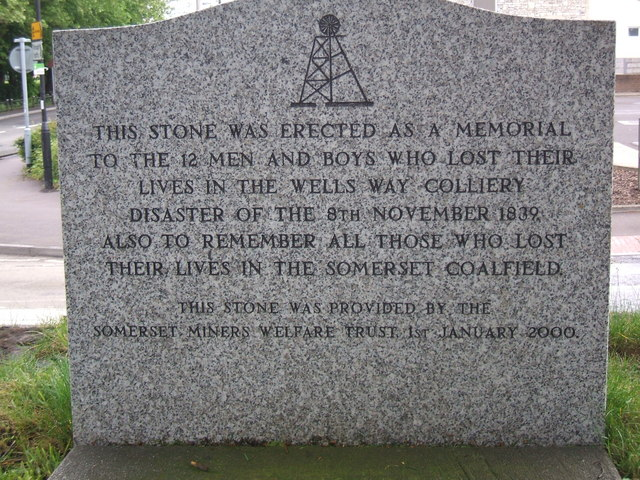
Memorial to miners who lost their lives in a pit disaster in 1839

Mining around Farrington Gurney has been undertaken since the 17th century where, by 1780, the pits were known as Farrington Colliery.

The main geological feature south of Hallatrow consists of Supra-Pennant Measures which include the upper coal measures and outcrops of sandstone. Relics of its industrial past are evident in the area, including the highly visible and distinct conical shaped Old Mills Batch with its generally unvegetated surface. The three disused colliery sites have been developed for light industry, a depot and a superstore.

Pits of Farrington Gurney
Colliery	Location	Coordinates	Opened	Closed	Shaft diameter (ft in (m))	Max shaft depth (ft (m))	Notes
Church Field (also known as Farrington of Ruett Slant)	Farrington Gurney	51.3015°N 2.5228°W	1921	1923	?	?	Drift Mine transferred to Marsh Lane
Farrington	Farrington Gurney	51.3015°N 2.5228°W	1782	1923	9 (2.7)	588 (179.2)	
Marsh Lane	Farrington Gurney	51.2943°N 2.5227°W	1921	1949	?	?	visited by the Prince of Wales on 7 July 1934
Old Mills	Midsomer Norton	51.2926°N 2.5040°W	1860	1966	11 (3.4)	1098 (334.7)	Merged with Springfield
Springfield	Midsomer Norton	51.2926°N 2.5040°W	1872	1966	9 6 (2.9)	965 (294.1)	Merged with Old Mills. Owned by W Evans and Co.

== Duchy Mines ==
The Duchy of Cornwall owned most of the mineral rights around Midsomer Norton and various small pits opened around 1750 to exploit these.

Pits of the Duchy Mines
Colliery	Location	Coordinates	Opened	Closed	Shaft diameter (ft in (m))	Max shaft depth (ft (m))	Notes
Clandown	Clandown	51.3027°N 2.4568°W	1811	1929	6 (1.8)	1437 (438)	1896 owned by Trustees of the late C. Hollwey 1908 Owned by Clandown Colliery Co
Old Welton	Midsomer Norton	51.2811°N 2.4609°W	1783	1896	4 6 (1.4)	1646 (501.7)	Merged with Clandown. 1896 owned by Old Welton Colliery Co. 1908 Owned by Clandown Colliery Co
Welton Hill	Midsomer Norton	51.2972°N 2.4768°W	1813	1896	6 (1.8)	605 (184.4)	

== Earl Waldegrave's Radstock Collieries ==
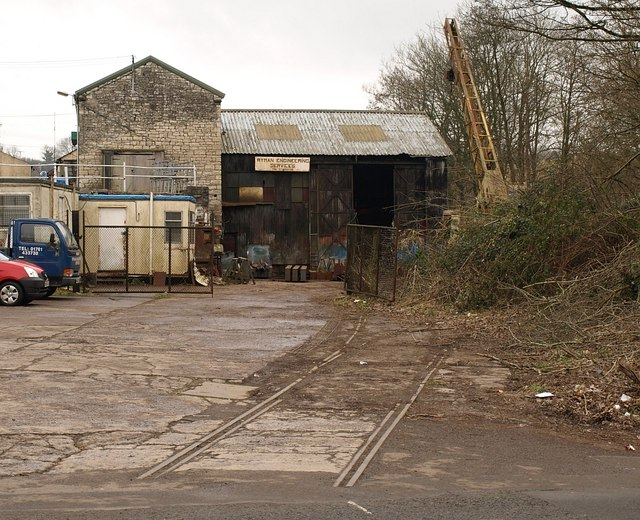
Old pit head buildings now an engineering works

In 1763 coal was discovered in Radstock and mining began on land owned by the Waldegrave family, Lords of the Manor since the English Civil War. In 1896 the pits were owned by the Trustee of Frances, late Countess of Waldegrave.

Radstock was the terminus for the southern branch of the Somerset Coal Canal which was subsequently turned into a tramway and became the centre for railway development and coal depots, coal washeries, workshops and a gas works. As part of the development of the Wiltshire, Somerset and Weymouth Railway, an 8-mile (13 km) line from Radstock to Frome was built to carry coal. In the 1870s the broad-gauge line was converted to standard gauge and connected to the Bristol and North Somerset Line connecting it to the Great Western Railway. The Radstock railway site comprises approximately 8.8 hectares of land which has been subject to planning and development applications.

Pits of Earl Waldegrave's Radstock Collieries
Colliery	Location	Coordinates	Opened	Closed	Shaft diameter (ft in (m))	Max shaft depth (ft (m))	Notes
Ludlows	Radstock	51.2857°N 2.4394°W	before 1790	1954	8 (2.4)	1686 (531.1)	
Middle Pit	Radstock	51.2946°N 2.4510°W	before 1801	1933	10 (3)	1791 (545.9)	
Old Pit	Radstock	51.2946°N 2.4510°W	before 1800	1858	6 (1.8)	942 (287.1)	
Smallcombe	Radstock	51.2964°N 2.4525°W	1797	1854	7 (2.1)	1074 (327.4)	
Tyning	Radstock	51.2929°N 2.4323°W	1837	1909	8 (2.4)	1007 (306.9)	
Wellsway	Westfield	51.2684°N 2.4923°W	1829	1920	4 6 (1.4)	754 (229.8)	

== Writhlington Collieries ==
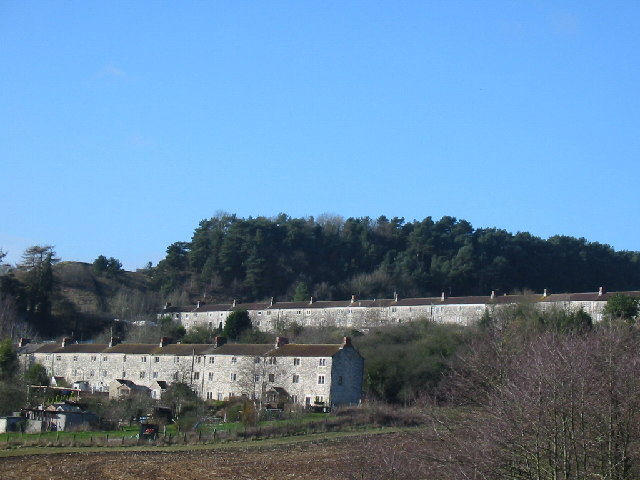
The Writhlington batch with miners' houses in the foreground

The Writhlington Collieries, close to the Waldegrave Collieries, were further east of Radstock and under different ownership. In 1896 they were owned by the Writhlington, Huish and Foxcote Colliery Co., and in 1908 by the Writhlington Collieries Co. Ltd. The Upper and Lower Writhlington, Huish & Foxcote pits were merged into a single colliery.

The base of the Kilmersdon valley consists of alluvium deposits. Above these, on both sides of all of the valleys, is a band of shales and clays from the Penarth group from the Triassic period. Most of the upland in this area is Lias Limestone (white and blue) while the highest part, above 130 m, south of Haydon, is an outcrop of Inferior Oolitic Limestone, both are from the Jurassic period. The steepest slopes of both the Kilmersdon and Snail's Bottom valleys have frequently slipped. Below these rocks are the coal bearing Carboniferous strata. Haydon is an outlying settlement of Radstock built to house miners from the local pit. The disused railway line and inclined railway at Haydon are important elements in the Kilmersdon valley east of Haydon. The modern landscape has a less maintained and 'rougher' character and texture than neighbouring agricultural areas caused mainly by the remnants of the coal industry and its infrastructure and changes in agricultural management. Disturbance caused by coal mining and the railways and the subsequent end of mining and abandonment of the railways has created valuable habitats for nature conservation.

The Writhlington spoil heap or "batch" is a Site of Special Scientific Interest (SSSI) because of the rich collection of fossils in the spoil. The Braysdown batch was planted with conifers, and is known as Braysdown Hill. The offices, blacksmith's shop and stables at the Upper Writhlington Colliery were converted into dwellings.

Pits of the Writhlington Collieries
Colliery	Location	Coordinates	Opened	Closed	Shaft diameter (ft in (m))	Max shaft depth (ft (m))	Notes
Braysdown	Peasedown St John	51.3109°N 2.4253°W	1845	1959	10 (3)	1834 (559)	1896 owned by Danbeny and Scobel 1908 Owned by Braysdown Colliery Co. At nationalisation in 1947 it was producing 37,250 tons.
Foxcote	Foxcote	51.2993°N 2.4080°W	1853	1931	9 (2.7)	1416 (431.6)	1896 owned by Writhlington, Huish and Foxcote Colliery Co.,
Huish	Kilmersdon	51.2677°N 2.4221°W	1822	1912	8 (2.4)	570 (173.7)	1896 owned by Writhlington, Huish and Foxcote Colliery Co.,
Kilmersdon	Kilmersdon	51.2623°N 2.4364°W	1875	1973	10 6 (3.2)	1582 (482.2)	1896 & 1908 owned by Kilmersdon Colliery Co.
Lower Writhlington	Writhlington	51.2947°N 2.4252°W	1829		10 (3)	1461 (445.3)	
Shoscombe	Shoscombe	51.3064°N 2.4138°W	c1828	by 1860	10 7 (3.2)	360 (109.7)	
Woodborough (also known as Wodborough Old Pit)	east of Radstock	51.3064°N 2.4353°W	?	1840s	5 3 (1.6)	426 (129.8)	
Upper Writhligton	Radstock	51.2929°N 2.4323°W	1805	1972	11 3 (3.4)	942 (287.1)	

== Norton Hill Collieries ==
Norton Hill Collieries at Westfield were owned by members of the Beauchamp family such as Sir Frank Beauchamp and his brother Louis Beauchamp who owned other collieries and related works on the coalfield at various times. They were also known as the Beauchamp goldmines as they were the most productive mines in the whole coalfield.

In 1900 a railway linking the colliery to the main Somerset and Dorset Joint Railway was constructed, and sidings laid in 1905 and 1907 which were reconstructed in 1953.

On 9 April 1908 an explosion approximately 1,500 feet (460 m) underground killed ten men and boys. As there were no mines rescue teams at that time, the manager and volunteers searched for survivors for 10 days. In 1911, partly as a result of the Norton Hill explosion, Winston Churchill was instrumental in the passing of the Coal Mines Act 1911 (1 & 2 Geo. 5. c. 50).

After nationalisation after World War II the National Coal Board spent £500,000 on modernising the mine's infrastructure to give it the capability for annual production of 315,000 tons; however, manpower shortages and geological problems caused the pit to close in 1966.

Pits of the Norton Hill Collieries
Colliery	Location	Coordinates	Opened	Closed	Shaft diameter (ft in (m))	Max shaft depth (ft (m))	Notes
Norton Hill New	Westfield	51.2801°N 2.4810°W	1903	1966	13 6	1503	
Norton Hill Old	Westfield	51.2801°N 2.4810°W	before 1839	1966	4 6	1247	In 1908 10 men were killed in a major coal dust explosion.

== Nettlebridge Valley ==
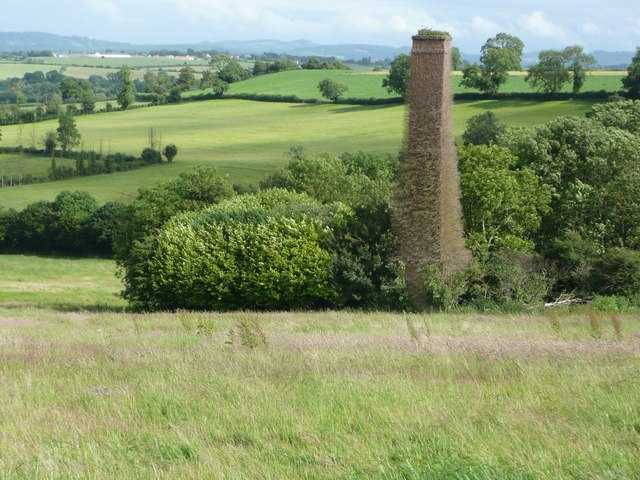
Old mine chimney of Oxley's Colliery near Buckland Dinham

There were numerous coal workings in the area from Gurney Slade east to Mells around the villages of Holcombe, Coleford and Stratton-on-the-Fosse. These included at least 52 bell pits, some with deeper shafts and 16 adits. Some coal may have been mined during Roman times and in the 13th century, making them the earliest coal mines in Somerset, but most development occurred in the 17th century. Most mining ended in the 19th century; however, Strap Colliery was re-opened in 1953 as Mendip Colliery and worked until 1969.

The Vobster Breach colliery had a unique system of long coking ovens which, along with the other buildings, have been designated as a Scheduled monument. The boiler chimney of Oxley's Colliery near Buckland Dinham which operated for a few years in the 1880s is a Grade II listed building.

Pits of the Nettlebridge Valley
Colliery	Location	Coordinates	Opened	Closed	Shaft diameter (ft in (m))	Max shaft depth (ft (m))	Notes
Barlake	Nettlebridge	51.2342°N 2.5020°W	before 1819	1870	5 6 (1.7)	435 (132.6)	
Bilboa	Mells	51.2489°N 2.4147°W	?	?	?	240 (73.2)	
Breach	Vobster	51.2389°N 2.4333°W	1860	c1880	?	867 (264.2)	
Charmborough	Holcombe	51.2632°N 2.4478°W	1932	1947	8 (2.43)	?	
Coal Barton	Coleford	51.2487°N 2.4591°W	?	?	?	?	Scene of a firedamp explosion which killed nine miners in 1869
Edford	Holcombe	51.2397°N 2.4734°W	1850s	1915	6 (1.8)	798 (243.2)	
Holcombe	Holcombe	51.2397°N 2.4734°W	1914	1923	?	?	
Luckington	Coleford	51.2542°N 2.4377°W	?	?	6 (1.8)	135 (41.4)	
Mackintosh	Coleford	51.2470°N 2.4362°W	1867	1919	8 5 (2.6)	1620 (493.8)	Merged with Newbury. 1896 owned by Westbury Iron Co. Ltd.,
Mells	Mells	51.2588°N 2.4120°W	1860s till 1880s	reopened 1909 till 1943	9 (2.7)	540 (164.6)	
Morewood Old	Nettlebridge	51.2440°N 2.5135°W	before 1824	1860s	4 6 (1.4)	1247 (380)	
Morewood New	Nettlebridge	51.2440°N 2.5135°W	1860s	1932	9 (2.7)	888 (26.8)	
Nettlebridge	Nettlebridge	51.2342°N 2.5020°W	before 1831	?	6 (1.8)	705 (214.9)	
Newbury	Coleford	51.2542°N 2.4377°W	1799	1927	9 (2.7)	720 (219.4)	Merged with Mackintosh. 1896 owned by Westbury Iron Co. Ltd., 1908 Owned by John Wainwright and Co. Ltd.
New Rock	Stratton-on-the-Fosse	51.2539°N 2.5036°W	1819	1968	4 6 (1.4)	1182 (360.3)	
Old Newbury	Coleford	51.2542°N 2.4377°W	c1710	1790s	?	250 (76.2)	
Old Rock	Nettlebridge	51.2440°N 2.5035°W	1786	1873	4 6 (1.4)	711 (216.7)	
Pitcot	Nettlebridge	51.2432°N 2.4935°W	before 1750	c1820s	5 (1.5)	555 (169.2)	
Strap (also known as Mendip or Downside Colliery)	Nettlebridge	51.2413°N 2.5078°W	1863	1879	10 6 (3.2)	1838 (560.2)	Deepest shaft on the Somerset coalfield. Reopened in 1953 and worked until 1969.
Sweetleaze	Nettlebridge	51.2413°N 2.5078°W	before 1858	1879	?	?	
Vobster	Vobster	51.2408°N 2.4233°W	before 1850s	1884	10 (3)	990 (301.8)	Had nationally unique long coking oven design.

== Bibliography ==
- Allsop, Niall (1993). The Somersetshire Coal Canal Rediscovered: A Walker's Guide. Bath: Millstream Books. ISBN 978-0-948975-35-6.
- Billingsley, John (1795). General View of the Agriculture of the County of Somerset. R. Cruttwell.
- Clew, Kenneth R. (1970). The Somersetshire Coal Canal and Railways. Newton Abbot: David and Charles. ISBN 978-0-7153-4792-8.
- Collier, Peter (1986). Colliers Way: The Somerset Coalfield. Ex Libris Press. ISBN 978-0-948578-05-2.
- Coombs, Howard (1930). Rev. Arthur N. Bax (ed.). Journal of a Somerset Rector, John Skinner, A. M., Antiquary 1772-1839. Parochial affairs of the parish of Camerton, 1822-1832. British Library mss. nos. 33673-33728. London: John Murray. Revised and enlarged edition entitled Journal of a Somerset rector, 1803-1834: parochial affairs of the Parish of Camerton British Museum manuscripts no. 33635-33728 & EG 3099F-3123F. John Murray.
- Cornwell, John (2005). Collieries of Somerset and Bristol. Landmark Publishing Ltd. ISBN 978-1-84306-170-0.
- Coysh, A.W.; Mason, E.J.; Waite, V. (1977). The Mendips. London: Robert Hale Ltd. ISBN 978-0-7091-6426-5.
- Down, C.G.; Warrington, A. J. (2005). The history of the Somerset coalfield. Radstock: Radstock Museum. ISBN 978-0-9551684-0-6.
- Durham, Ian; Durham, Mary (1991). Chew Magna and the Chew Valley in old photographs. Redcliffe Press. ISBN 978-1-872971-61-2.
- Green, G.W. (1992). Bristol and Gloucester Region (Regional Geology Guides) (3rd Ed). Keyworth, Notts: British Geological Survey. ISBN 978-0-11-884482-6.
- Gould, Shane (1999). The Somerset Coalfield. Somerset Industrial Archaeological Society.
- Halse, Roger; Castens, Simon (2000). The Somersetshire Coal Canal: A Pictorial Journey. Bath: Millstream Books. ISBN 978-0-948975-58-5.
- Handley, Chris (2006). Transport & Industrial Development in the Somerset Coalfield. Radstock: Radstock, Midsomer Norton and District Museum Society.
- Williams, W.J. (1976). Coal Mining in Bishop Sutton North Somerset c.1799-1929.
