= The True Briton (magazine) =

Masthead in 1853

The True Briton was the title of two very different periodicals in successive centuries. The first was published in 1723/4 by Philip, Duke of Wharton in the Jacobite cause, to oppose Walpole's government and support Dean Atterbury. The second was an English weekly magazine published by Fanny Mayne between 1851 and 1854. The magazine had an evangelical stance.
