= BA postcode area =

Postcode area within the United Kingdom

Bath
- Postcode area
- Coordinates: 51.222°N 2.421°W
- Country: United Kingdom
- Postcode area: BA
- Postcode area name: Bath
- Post towns: 16
- Postcode districts: 19
- Postcode sectors: 81
- Postcodes (live): 15,136
- Postcodes (total): 19,944
- Statistics as at May 2020

The BA postcode area, also known as the Bath postcode area, is a group of nineteen postcode districts in South West England, within sixteen post towns. These cover east Somerset (including Bath, Yeovil, Bruton, Castle Cary, Frome, Glastonbury, Radstock, Shepton Mallet, Street, Templecombe, Wells and Wincanton) and west Wiltshire (including Bradford on Avon, Trowbridge, Warminster and Westbury), plus very small parts of north-west Dorset and south Gloucestershire.

== Coverage ==
The approximate coverage of the postcode districts:

Postcode district	Post town	Coverage	Local authority area(s)
BA1	BATH	Bath north of the Avon, Batheaston, Bathford, Swainswick	Bath and North East Somerset, South Gloucestershire
BA2	BATH	Bath south of the Avon, Farmborough, Timsbury, Peasedown St John, Wellow, Hinton Charterhouse, Norton St Philip, Freshford, Limpley Stoke	Bath and North East Somerset, Somerset, Wiltshire
BA3	RADSTOCK	Radstock, Midsomer Norton, Holcombe, Coleford	Bath and North East Somerset, Somerset
BA4	SHEPTON MALLET	Shepton Mallet, Evercreech	Somerset
BA5	WELLS	Wells, Wookey, Westbury-sub-Mendip	Somerset
BA6	GLASTONBURY	Glastonbury, Baltonsborough, Meare, Westhay	Somerset
BA7	CASTLE CARY	Castle Cary, Ansford, Alford, Lovington	Somerset
BA8	TEMPLECOMBE	Templecombe, Henstridge, Horsington	Somerset
BA9	BRUTON		non-geographic
BA9	WINCANTON	Wincanton, Penselwood, Cucklington, Holton, Yarlington	Somerset
BA10	BRUTON	Bruton, Pitcombe, Redlynch, Brewham	Somerset
BA11	FROME	Frome, Beckington	Somerset
BA12	WARMINSTER	Warminster, Mere, Corsley, Zeals, Kilmington	Wiltshire
BA13	WESTBURY	Westbury, Chapmanslade	Wiltshire
BA14	TROWBRIDGE	Trowbridge	Wiltshire
BA15	BRADFORD-ON-AVON	Bradford-on-Avon, Winsley, Westwood, Monkton Farleigh, South Wraxall	Wiltshire
BA16	STREET	Street, Walton	Somerset
BA20	YEOVIL	Yeovil (centre and south)	Somerset
BA21	YEOVIL	Yeovil (north), Mudford	Somerset, Dorset
BA22	YEOVIL	Yeovil (west), East Coker, West Coker, Ilchester, Sparkford, Marston Magna, Halstock, Stoford, Clifton Maybank	Somerset, Dorset

== Map ==
BA postcode area map, showing postcode districts in red and post towns in grey text, with links to nearby BH, BS, DT, SN, SP and TA postcode areas.

== See also ==
- List of postcode areas in the United Kingdom
- Postcode Address File
