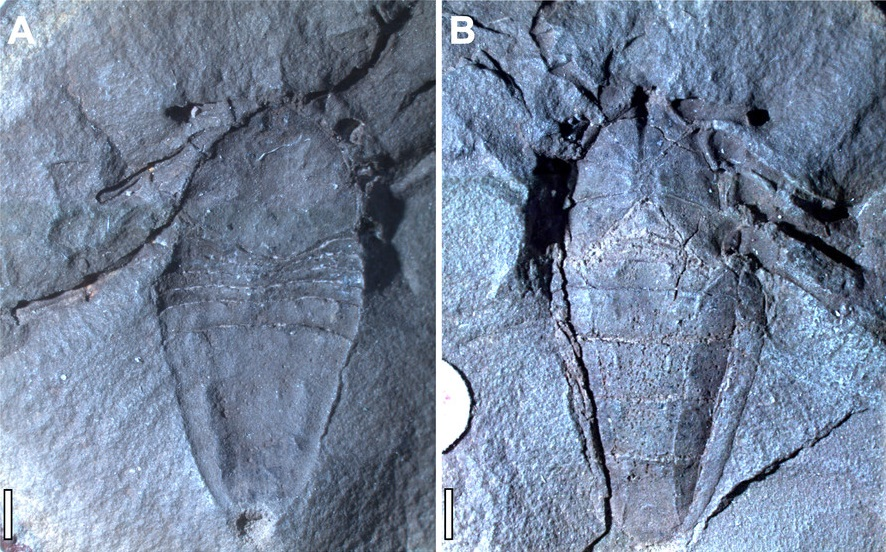
- Goniotarbus angulatus fossil, dorsal and ventral views
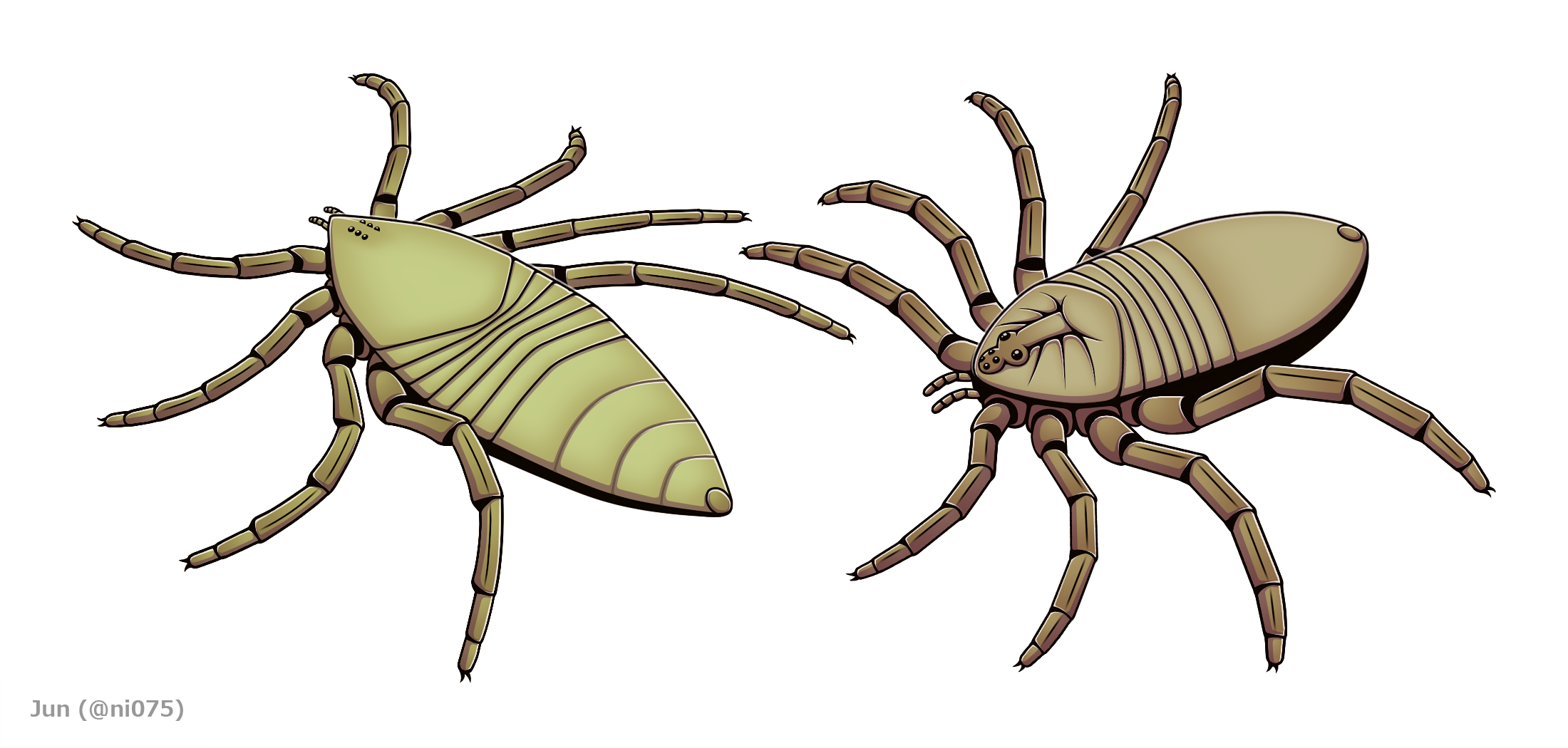
- Reconstruction of Goniotarbus angulatus and Mesotarbus peteri

Scientific classification
- Kingdom: Animalia
- Phylum: Arthropoda
- Subphylum: Chelicerata
- Class: Arachnida
- Order: †Phalangiotarbida; Haase, 1890

Families
- Currently 4 families, see text for details.

Synonyms
- Architarbi; Phalangiotarbi

= Phalangiotarbida =

Phalangiotarbida Temporal range: Early Devonian–Early Permian

Extinct order of arachnids

Phalangiotarbida is an extinct arachnid order first recorded from the Early Devonian of Germany and most widespread in the Upper Carboniferous coal measures of Europe and North America. The last species are known from the early Permian Rotliegend of Germany.

The affinities of phalangiotarbids are obscure, with most authors favouring affinities with Opiliones (harvestmen) and/or Acari (mites and ticks). Phalangiotarbida has been recently (2004) proposed to be sister group to (Palpigradi+Tetrapulmonata): the taxon Megoperculata sensu Shultz (1990).

Nemastomoides depressus, described as a harvestman in the family Nemastomoididae, is actually a poorly preserved phalangiotarbid.

== Taxa included ==
- Family Anthracotarbidae Kjellesvig-Waering, 1969
  - Genus Anthracotarbus Kjellesvig-Waering, 1969
    - Species Anthracotarbus hintoni Kjellesvig-Waering, 1969
- Family Architarbidae Karsch, 1882
  - Genus Architarbus Scudder, 1868
    - Species Architarbus hoffmanni Guthörl, 1934 (Jr synonyms Opiliotarbus kliveri Waterlot, 1934; Goniotarbus sarana Guthörl, 1965)
    - Species Architarbus minor Petrunkevitch, 1913
    - Species Architarbus rotundatus Scudder, 1868
  - Genus Bornatarbus Rößler & Schneider, 1997
    - Species Bornatarbus mayasii Haupt in Nindel, 1955
  - Genus Devonotarbus Poschmann, Anderson & Dunlop, 2005
    - Species Devonotarbus hombachensis Poschmann, Anderson & Dunlop, 2005
  - Genus Discotarbus Petrunkevitch, 1913
    - Species Discotarbus deplanatus Petrunkevitch, 1913
  - Genus Geratarbus Scudder, 1890
    - Species Geratarbus lacoei Scudder, 1890
    - Species Geratarbus bohemicus Petrunkevitch, 1953
  - Genus Goniotarbus Petrunkevitch, 1953
    - Species Goniotarbus angulatus Pocock, 1911
    - Species Goniotarbus tuberculatus Pocock, 1911
  - Genus Hadrachne Melander, 1903
    - Species Hadrachne horribilis Melander, 1903
  - Genus Leptotarbus Petrunkevitch, 1945
    - Species Leptotarbus torpedo Pocock, 1911
  - Genus Mesotarbus Petrunkevitch, 1949
    - Species Mesotarbus angustus Pocock, 1911
    - Species Mesotarbus eggintoni Pocock, 1911
    - Species Mesotarbus hindi Pocock, 1911
    - Species Mesotarbus intermedius Petrunkevitch, 1949
    - Species Mesotarbus peteri Dunlop & Horrocks, 1997
  - Genus Metatarbus Petrunkevitch, 1913
    - Species Metatarbus triangularus Petrunkevitch, 1913
  - Genus Ootarbus Petrunkevitch, 1945
    - Species Ootarbus pulcher Petrunkevitch, 1945
    - Species Ootarbus ovatus Petrunkevitch, 1945
  - Genus OrthotarbusPetrunkevitch, 1945
    - Species Orthotarbus minutus Petrunkevitch, 1913
    - Species Orthotarbus robustus Petrunkevitch, 1945
    - Species Orthotarbus nyranensis Petrunkevitch, 1953
  - Genus Paratarbus Petrunkevitch, 1945
    - Species Paratarbus carbonarius Petrunkevitch, 1945
  - Genus Phalangiotarbus Haase, 1890
    - Species Phalangiotarbus subovalis Woodward, 1872
  - Genus Pycnotarbus Darber, 1990
    - Species Pycnotarbus verrucosus Darber, 1990
  - Genus Triangulotarbus Patrick, 1989
    - Species Triangulotarbus terrehautensis Patrick, 1989
- Family Heterotarbidae Petrunkevitch, 1913
  - Genus Heterotarbus Petrunkevitch, 1913
    - Species Heterotarbus ovatus Petrunkevitch, 1913
- Family Opiliotarbidae Petrunkevitch, 1949
  - Genus Opiliotarbus Pocock, 1910
    - Species Opiliotarbus elongatus Scudder, 1890
- nomina dubia
  - Eotarbus litoralis Kušta, 1888
  - Nemastomoides depressus Petrunkevitch, 1913

== Bibliography ==
- Petrunkevitch, Alexander I. (1955): Arachnida. pp. 42–162 in Treatise on Invertebrate Palaeontology, part P. Arthropoda 2 (R.C. Moore, ed.). Geological Society of America & University of Kansas Press, Lawrence.
- Shultz, Jeffrey W.(1990): Evolutionary morphology and phylogeny of Arachnida. Cladistics 6: 1-38.
- Dunlop, Jason A. (1997): Palaeozoic arachnids and their significance for arachnid phylogeny. Proceedings of the 16th European Colloquium of Arachnology 65–82. - Abstract
- Pollitt, Jessica R.; Braddy, Simon J. & Dunlop, Jason A. (2004): The phylogenetic position of the extinct arachnid order Phalangiotarbida Haase, 1890, with reference to the fauna from the Writhlington Geological Nature Reserve (Somerset, UK). Transactions of the Royal Society of Edinburgh, Earth Sciences, 94(3): 243–259. doi:10.1017/S0263593300000651 - PDF available on request
- Pinto-da-Rocha, R., Machado, G. & Giribet, G. (eds.) (2007): Harvestmen - The Biology of Opiliones. Harvard University Press ISBN 0-674-02343-9
