= Frome and East Somerset =

UK Parliament constituency (since 2024)

- County constituency for the House of Commons
- Interactive map of boundaries from 2024
- Boundary of Frome and East Somerset in South West England
- County: Somerset
- Electorate: 70,177 (2023)
- Major settlements: Frome, Midsomer Norton, Radstock, Peasedown St John

Current constituency
- Created: 2024
- Member of Parliament: Anna Sabine (Liberal Democrats)
- Seats: One
- Created from: Somerton and Frome & North East Somerset

Frome and East Somerset is a constituency of the House of Commons in the UK Parliament. It was first contested at the 2024 general election. It was created from the parts of the former constituencies of Somerton and Frome and North East Somerset as a result of the 2023 Periodic Review of Westminster constituencies. It has been represented since 2024 by Anna Sabine of the Liberal Democrats.

== Constituency profile ==
Frome and East Somerset is a rural constituency located in Somerset. Frome is its largest town, with a population of around 29,000. Other settlements include the connected towns of Midsomer Norton and Radstock and the villages of Peasedown St John and Evercreech. Frome has a history of textile manufacturing and metalworking, and many of its residents commute to the nearby cities of Bath and Bristol. The town is generally wealthy and has been listed by The Sunday Times as the best place to live in South West England. Midsomer Norton and Radstock lie within the now-disused Somerset Coalfield, one of the few coal mining areas that existed in Southern England. House prices in the constituency are above national averages.

In general, residents are older and have average levels of wealth and education compared to the rest of the country. White people made up 97% of the population at the 2021 census. At the local council level, Frome is represented by Green Party councillors, Radstock by the Labour Party and the rest of the constituency by a mixture of Liberal Democrats and Conservatives. An estimated 51% of voters in Frome and East Somerset supported leaving the European Union in the 2016 referendum, similar to the nationwide figure.

== Boundaries ==
Under the 2023 Periodic Review of Westminster constituencies, the constituency was defined as being composed of the following as they existed on 1 December 2020:

- The District of Bath and North East Somerset wards of Bathavon South, Midsomer Norton North, Midsomer Norton Redfield, Peasedown, Radstock, and Westfield.
- The District of Mendip wards of: Ammerdown; Ashwick, Chilcompton and Stratton; Beckington and Selwood; Coleford and Holcombe; Cranmore, Doulting and Nunney; Creech; Frome Berkley Down; Frome College; Frome Keyford; Frome Market; Frome Oakfield; Frome Park; Postlebury; Rode and Norton St. Philip; The Pennards and Ditcheat.

With effect from 1 April 2023, the District of Mendip was abolished and absorbed into the new unitary authority of Somerset. Consequently, the constituency now comprises the following from the 2024 general election:

- The District of Bath and North East Somerset wards of: Bathavon South; Midsomer Norton North; Midsomer Norton Redfield; Peasedown; Radstock; Westfield.
- The Somerset electoral divisions of: Frome East; Frome North; Frome West; Mendip Central and East; Mendip Hills (part); Mendip South (most).

The constituency covers the town of Frome and surrounding rural areas, previously part of the abolished constituency of Somerton and Frome; and smaller communities to the South of Bath, including Midsomer Norton, Radstock and Peasedown St John, previously part of the abolished constituency of North East Somerset.

== Members of Parliament ==
Election	Member	Party
2024	Anna Sabine	Liberal Democrats

== Elections ==
=== Elections in the 2020s ===
General election 2024: Frome and East Somerset
Party	Candidate	Votes	%	±%
Liberal Democrats	Anna Sabine	16,580	35.5	+12.0
Conservative	Lucy Trimnell	11,165	23.9	−25.4
Reform UK	David Swain	6,441	13.8	N/A
Labour	Robin Moss	6,416	13.7	−7.5
Green	Martin Dimery	5,083	10.9	+4.8
Independent	Shaun Hughes	737	1.6	N/A
Independent	Gavin Heathcote	294	0.6	N/A
Majority		5,415	11.6	N/A
Turnout		46,716	65.5	–2.9
Registered electors		71,593		
Liberal Democrats gain from Conservative		Swing	▲18.7	

=== Elections in the 2010s ===
2019 notional result
Party	Vote	%
Conservative	23,646	49.3
Liberal Democrats	11,251	23.5
Labour	10,156	21.2
Green	2,917	6.1
Turnout	47,970	68.4
Electorate	70,177	
