= River Somer =

River in Somerset, England

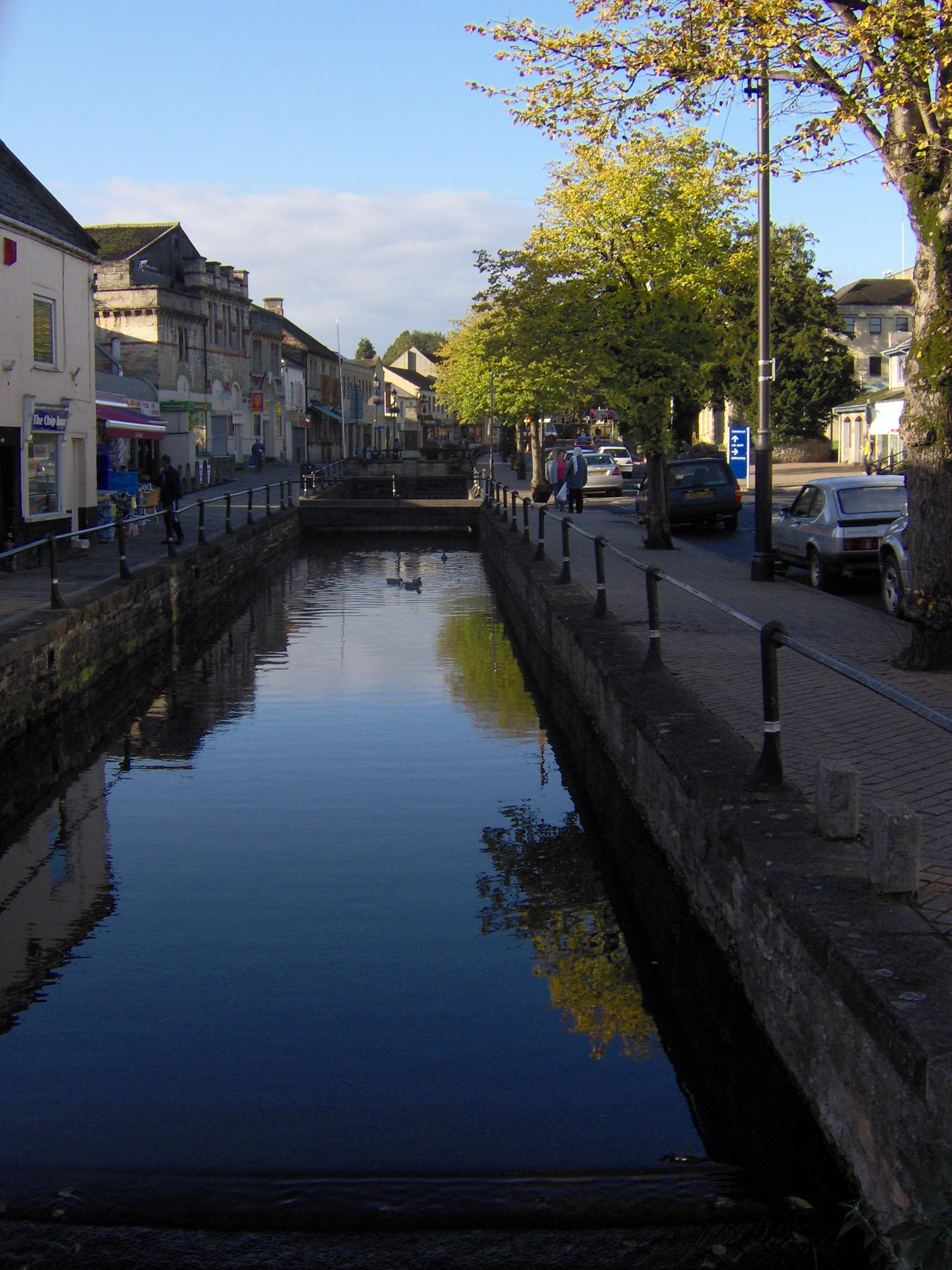
- River Somer at Midsomer Norton

Location
- Country: England
- County: Somerset

Physical characteristics
- Source
  - location: Chilcompton, Mendip, Somerset, England
  - coordinates: 51°15′44″N 2°30′28″W
- Mouth: Wellow Brook
  - location: Midsomer Norton, Bath and North East Somerset, Somerset, England
  - coordinates: 51°17′32″N 2°26′49″W

The River Somer is a small river in Somerset, England.

== Course ==
The river rises at Chilcompton and flows to Midsomer Norton where it joins the Wellow Brook, which flows through Wellow and joins the Cam Brook at Midford to form Midford Brook before joining the River Avon close to the Dundas Aqueduct and the remains of the Somerset Coal Canal.

== Midsomer's name, spring floods and rough roads ==
There is some debate as to the origin of the name "Midsomer". Different schools of thought include the difficulty in travelling to the area in times of flooding as opposed to the town's position at the branch of the river Somer. Eilert Ekwall wrote that the village "is said to be so called in allusion to the festival held at midsummer on the day of St. John, the patron saint." John Wesley wrote of the appalling local road conditions which ensured it was reachable "only in midsummer." As Simon Winchester notes in his book The Map that Changed the World, "...the roads on this part of Somerset were atrocious, thick with mud and as rough as the surface of the moon".

== Flood and water quality management ==
In 1974 and 1975 the Midsomer Norton Flood Alleviation Tunnel was constructed which carries water away from the town centre at times of high rainfall.

Concerns about the state of the river and the potential for flooding lead to the creation of the locally based management team in 2007. They have worked with the Bath and North East Somerset council and other stakeholders within the Riparian zone to improve the flow and appearance of the river. This involved the removal of weirs, construction of a new channel, removal of silt from the bed of the river and creating beds for plants along the sides of the river.

Reviews following the work follow up studies have looked at the effects on the environment and wildlife. Improvements have been seen for fish, aquatic invertebrates, birds, mammals (potentially including otters) and bees and terrestrial invertebrates. The water quality is assessed as moderate in terms of ecology and good in relation to chemical pollutants, which is an improvement made on the measurements made in 1996.
