= Wellow Brook =

River in Somerset, England

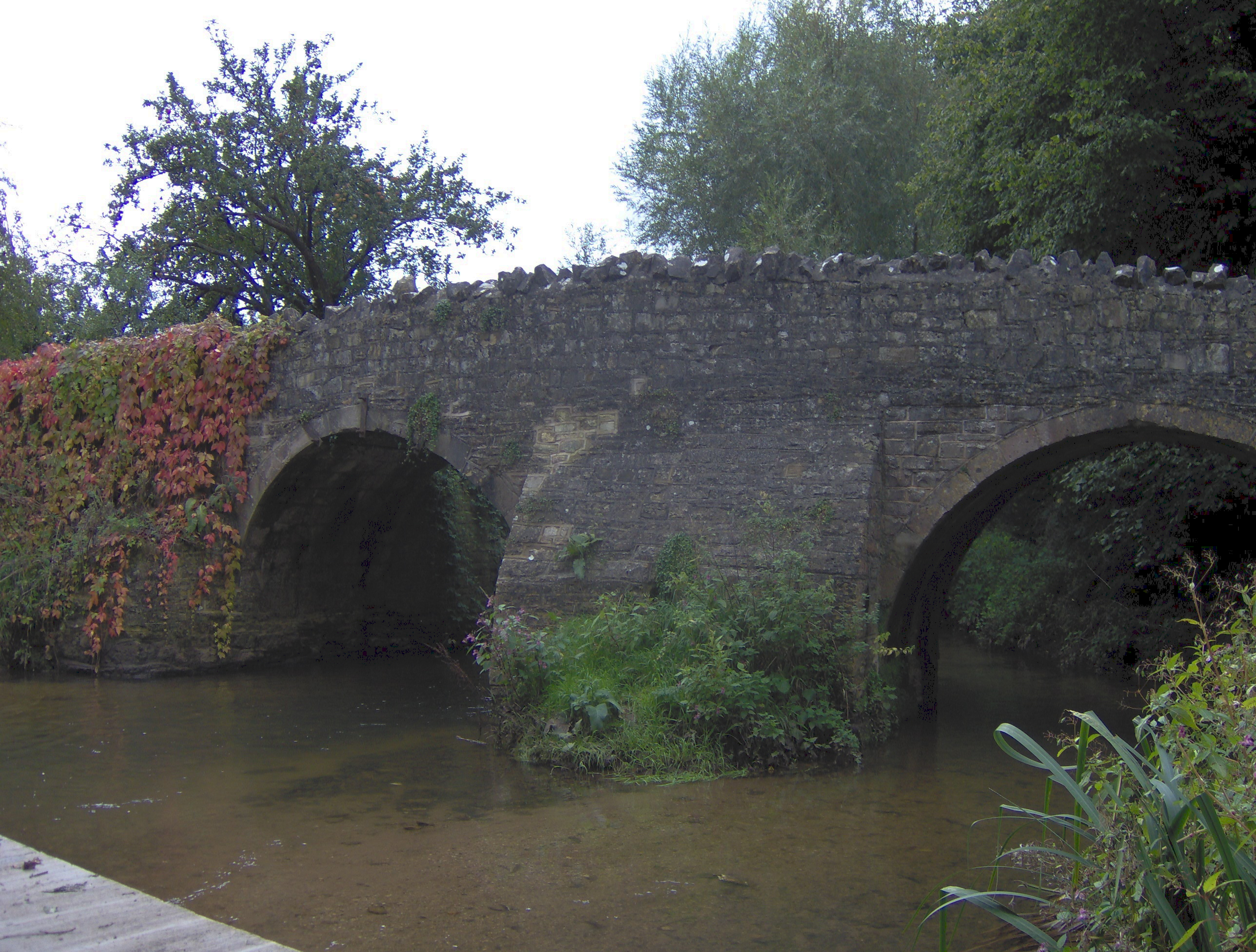
- Medieval packhorse bridge at Wellow, Somerset

Location
- Country: England
- County: Somerset
- Cities: Radstock, Wellow

Physical characteristics
- Source
  - location: Kilmersdon, Somerset, England
  - coordinates: 51°15′34″N 2°26′00″W
- Mouth: Midford Brook
  - location: Midford, Bath and North East Somerset, Somerset, England
  - coordinates: 51°20′27″N 2°20′32″W

Basin features
- Tributaries
  - right: River Somer

The Wellow Brook is a small river in Somerset, England.

It rises near Ston Easton Park in the village of Ston Easton and flows east to Midsomer Norton. West of Radstock, it is joined by the River Somer and a tributary from Kilmersdon (formed itself from Snails Brook and Kilmersdon Brook) to the south. It then flows through Wellow before joining the Cam Brook at Midford to form Midford Brook, before joining the River Avon close to the Dundas Aqueduct.

The Environment Agency does not recognise the Midford Brook, instead identifying the Wellow Brook as continuing to the Avon. On this basis the length of the Wellow Brook, from Radstock to the Avon, is 17.8 km (11.1 mi).

Alongside the brook are remains of the Somerset Coal Canal which served the Somerset Coalfield in the 19th century.

The valley sides are rounded and undulating through erosion. There are several springs dotted along the valley sides and the resultant streams are often lined with trees. The junction of the valley sides with the base is usually gentle and rounded and the valley floors are narrow but flat with the brooks meandering freely across their flood plain. The brook is quite deep in places and frequently has steep sides. This was taken advantage of in making anti-tank defences during World War II when many concrete bunkers known as pillboxes were built as part of the GHQ Line to defend against an expected German invasion.

The area is of interest to the Cam Valley Wildlife Group.
