= Cam Brook =

River in Somerset, England

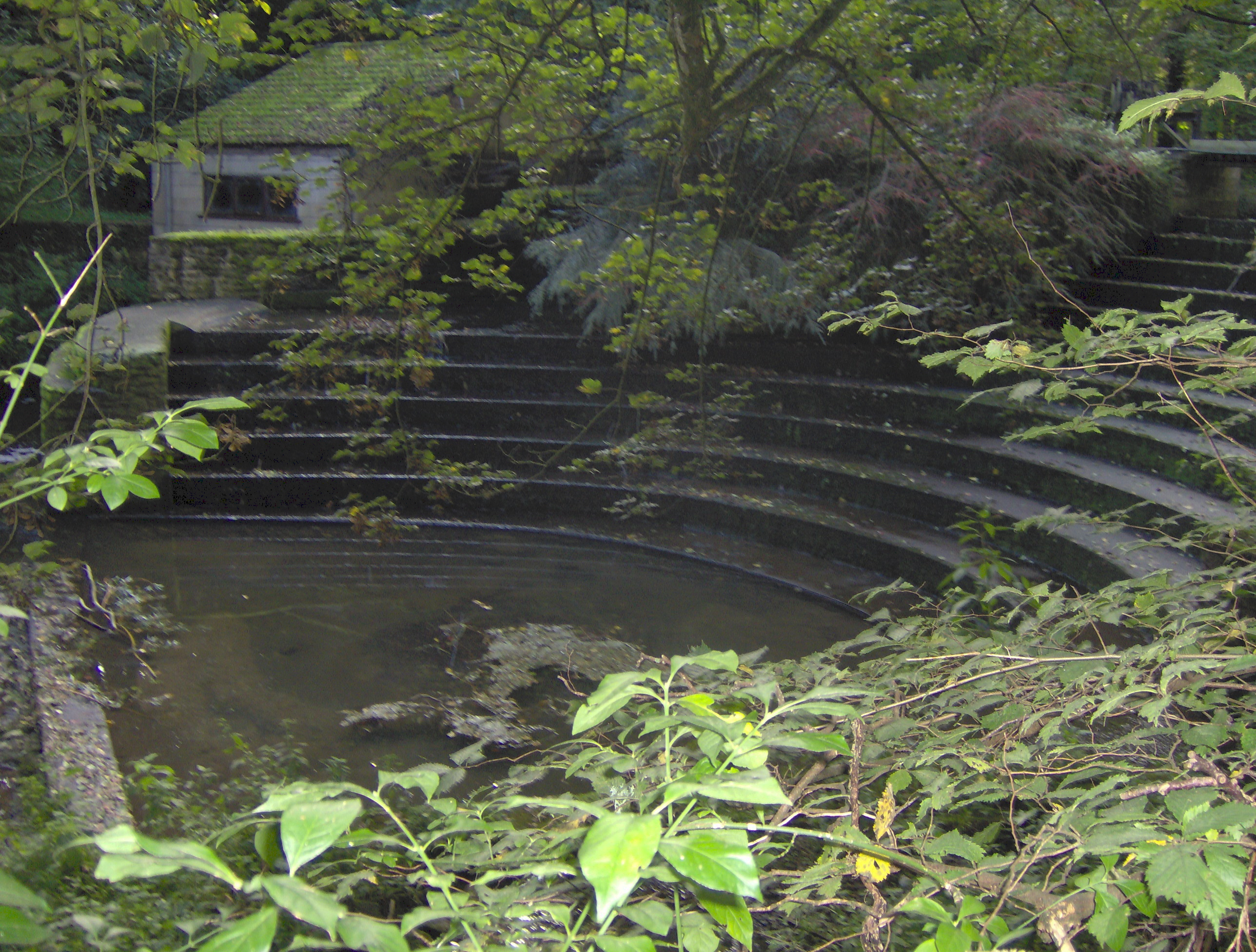
- Weir on Cam Brook at Combe Hay

Location
- Country: England
- State: Somerset
- District: Bath and North East Somerset
- Cities: Cameley, Temple Cloud, Camerton, Dunkerton, Combe Hay

Physical characteristics
- Source
  - location: Hinton Blewitt, Bath and North East Somerset, Somerset, England
  - coordinates: 51°18′26″N 2°35′05″W
- Mouth: Midford Brook
  - location: Midford, Bath and North East Somerset, Somerset, England
  - coordinates: 51°20′27″N 2°20′32″W

The Cam brook is a small river in Somerset, England. It rises near Hinton Blewitt, flows through Cameley, Temple Cloud, Camerton, Dunkerton and Combe Hay. It then joins the Wellow Brook at Midford to form Midford Brook before joining the River Avon close to the Dundas Aqueduct.

Along its length are the remains of the Somerset Coal Canal which originally took its water from Cam brook, and serviced the Somerset coalfield. The Long Dole Wood and Meadows SSSI is situated on the flood plain of a valley formed by a tributary of the brook.

== Cam Valley ==
Cam Valley is a scenic area. The valley sides are rounded and undulating through erosion. There are several springs dotted along the valley sides and the resultant streams are often lined with trees. The junction of the valley sides with the base is usually gentle and rounded and the valley floors are narrow but flat with the brooks meandering freely across their flood plain. The brook is quite deep in places and frequently has steep sides. The area is of interest to the Cam Valley Wildlife Group along with nearby Wellow Brook,

The 1953 film The Titfield Thunderbolt, an Ealing Studios comedy about a group of villagers attempting to run a service on a disused branch line, was filmed on the recently closed Camerton branch of the Bristol and North Somerset Railway branch line along the Cam Brook valley. The cricket scene was filmed near the viaduct hotel at Limpley Stoke.

The Cam Valley Morris Men are based in nearby Priddy and following the cider harvest, can often be seen in Kilmersdon for the traditional celebrations of wassailing.

Actress Maisie Williams is a native of Clutton.
