= Limpley Stoke =

Village in Wiltshire, England

Coordinates: 51.347°N 2.316°W

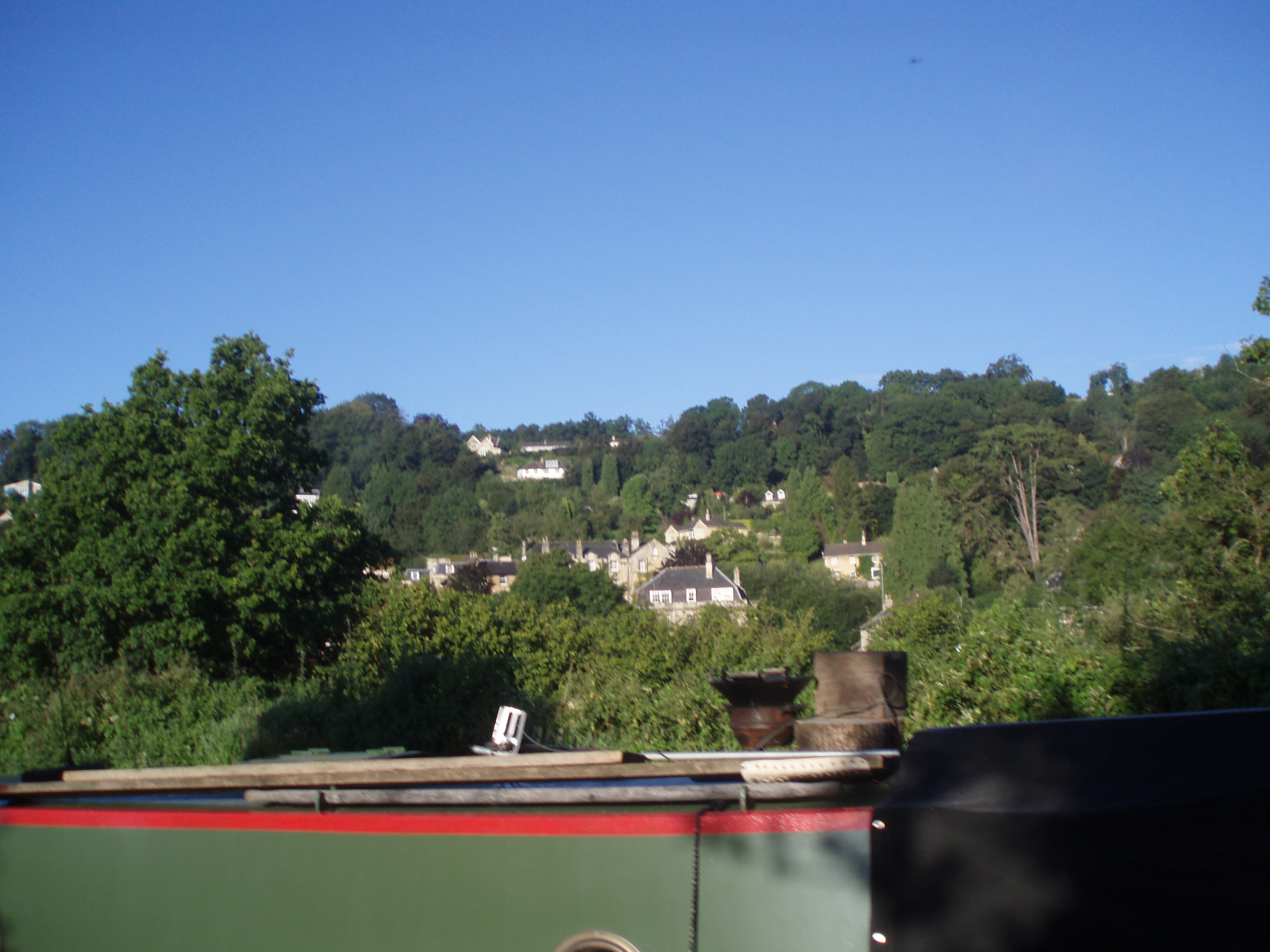
- The village seen from the Kennet and Avon Canal

- Location within Wiltshire
- Population: 541 (2011)
- OS grid reference: ST781609
- Unitary authority: Wiltshire
- Ceremonial county: Wiltshire
- Region: South West
- Country: England
- Sovereign state: United Kingdom
- Post town: Bath
- Postcode district: BA2
- Dialling code: 01225
- Police: Wiltshire
- Fire: Dorset and Wiltshire
- Ambulance: South Western
- UK Parliament: Melksham and Devizes
- Website: Parish Council

Limpley Stoke is a village and civil parish in Wiltshire, England. It lies in the Avon valley between Bath and Freshford, and is both above and below the A36 road.

The parish is surrounded to the north, west and south by the Bath and North East Somerset district and includes the outskirts of the Somerset villages of Freshford and Midford. The Avon forms the eastern boundary of the parish, and its tributary the Midford Brook is the boundary in the north and west.

The parish had a population of 593 in 2021, up from 541 in 2011.

== History ==
The 18th-century country house at Waterhouse is a Grade II listed building.

Limpley Stoke was the westernmost part of the ancient hundred of Bradford, and a tithing of Bradford parish, which was divided into civil parishes in 1894.

A small Baptist chapel was built on Middle Stoke in 1815 and rebuilt in 1888, providing 150 seats. The chapel closed in the 1970s. A National School was opened on Middle Stoke in 1845; in 1893 there were 51 pupils. The school closed in 1932 owing to low pupil numbers, and the building is now the village hall.

In 1886 E.G. Browne and J.C. Margetson acquired a cloth mill, known as Avon Mill, on the banks of the River Avon at Limpley Stoke. The previous owners of the mill had originally been timber merchants, but had later diversified into the production of rubber goods. By 1890 the business had transferred to premises in Melksham, where it became the leading industry of the town; the company later became Avon Rubber.

The Hop Pole is a 17th-century pub which was used in 1993 for the filming of The Remains of the Day with Anthony Hopkins. After closing in 2018, it was brought into community ownership and reopened in January 2025.

A landmark water tower, nearby in Friary Wood, is referred to as the Limpley Stoke Water Tower.

=== Canals and railways ===
The Kennet and Avon Canal was built in 1804 through the Avon valley, on the other side of the parish boundary. The Somerset Coal Canal opened in 1805; it followed the Midford Brook, again just beyond the parish boundary, to join the Kennet and Avon next to the Dundas Aqueduct in Monkton Combe parish.

In 1857 the Great Western Railway (GWR) built their branch from Bradford Junction, north of Trowbridge, via Bradford on Avon to join their main line at Bathampton. The line follows the Avon valley, on the Limpley Stoke side of the river; Limpley Stoke station was below the north end of the village.

The Coal Canal closed in 1898 and its route was bought by the GWR, who used it to extend their Bristol and North Somerset Railway from Camerton to Limpley Stoke; this line opened in 1910. Passenger traffic was light and ceased in 1925. Goods service from Camerton continued until 1951 and the track was lifted in 1958. The Camerton branch was used to film scenes for the 1953 Ealing comedy, The Titfield Thunderbolt.

Limpley Stoke station closed in 1966. The line remains open, as part of the Wessex Main Line. The Kennet and Avon Canal fell into decline and almost closed in the 1950s, but restoration began in the 1970s and the whole canal was reopened in 1990.

== Parish church ==
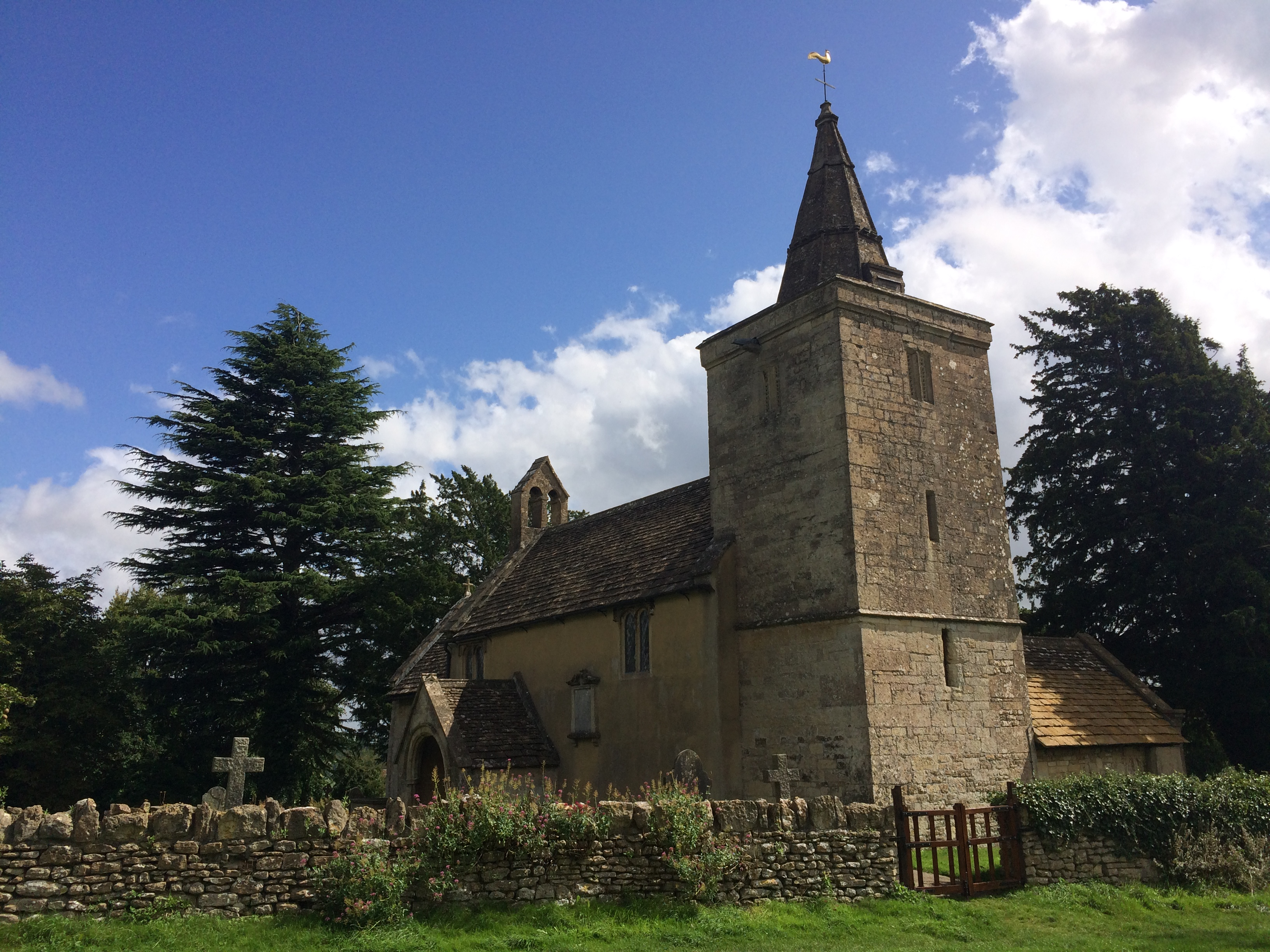
St Mary's Church

The Church of England parish church of Saint Mary dates from the 10th century; it was first dedicated to the Wiltshire saint Edith of Wilton, but in the 16th century, after some five hundred years, was rededicated to St Mary.

The present building was begun in the early 13th century, and the north porch has an arch of that period. The short west tower was added in the 15th century; restoration in 1870 was of limited scope, leading Nikolaus Pevsner to describe the church as "unrestored". When a south aisle and vestry were added in 1921 to designs of Charles Nicholson, a Saxon arch was incorporated in the arcade.

The stone pulpit is from the 15th century. There is one bell, cast in 1596. Stained glass includes a 1932 memorial by Archibald Keightley Nicholson. The church was designated as Grade II* listed in 1962.

The early church was annexed to the church at Bradford. In 1846 the chapelry of Limpley Stoke was joined with that of Winsley to form a perpetual curacy; a new parish, Winsley with Limpley Stoke, was created in 1868. In 1970 the parish was uncoupled from Winsley and united with Freshford, in the diocese of Bath and Wells. In 1976 the parish of Hinton Charterhouse was added, thus today the church is in the parish of Freshford with Limpley Stoke and Hinton Charterhouse, alongside St Peter's, Freshford and St John the Baptist, Hinton Charterhouse.

== Notable residents ==
- Kate Allenby, modern pentathlete, Olympic bronze medallist
- Miles Kington (1941–2008), journalist, musician and broadcaster
- Vicky Holland, modern triathlete

== Gallery ==
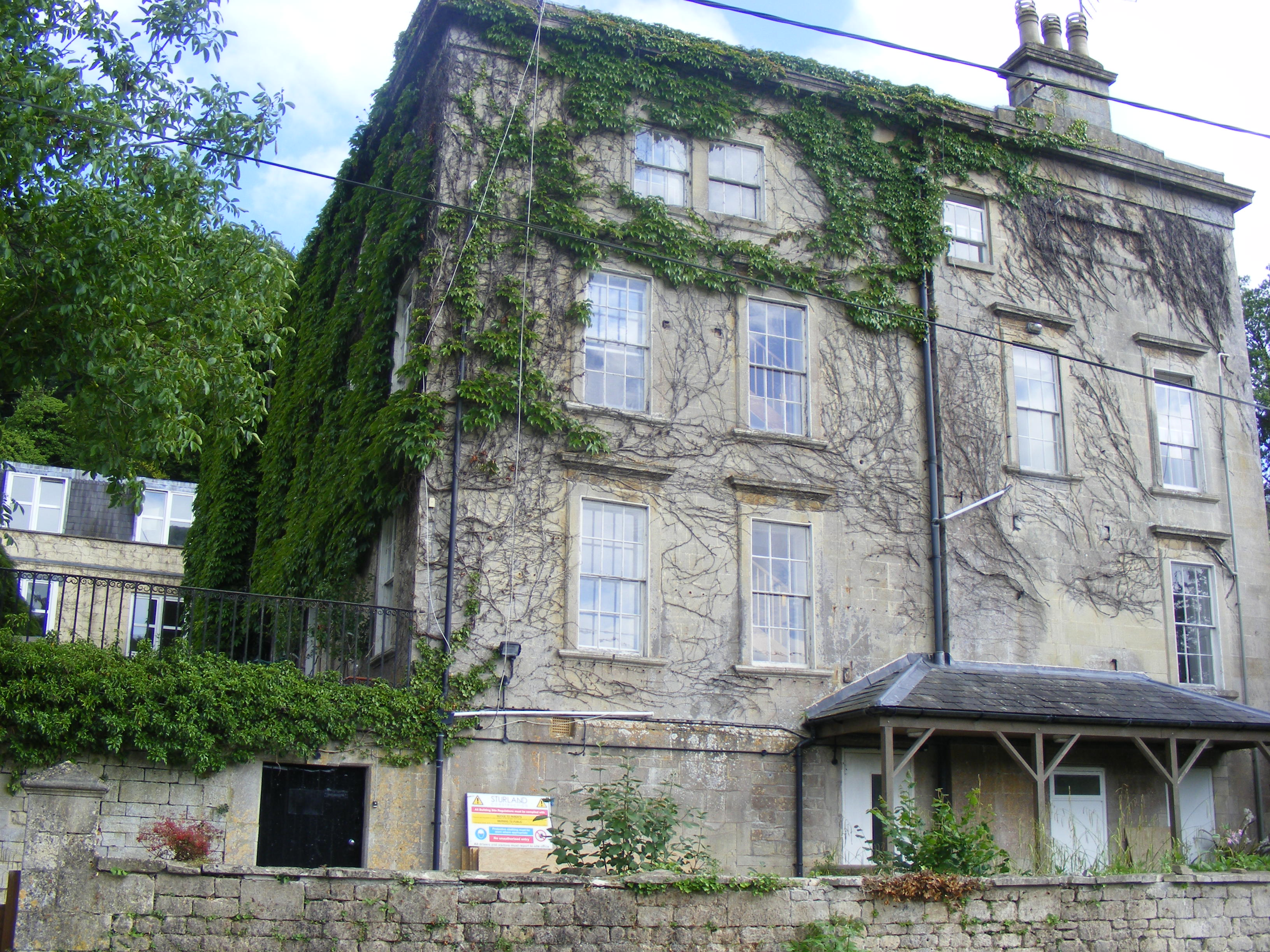
Waterhouse

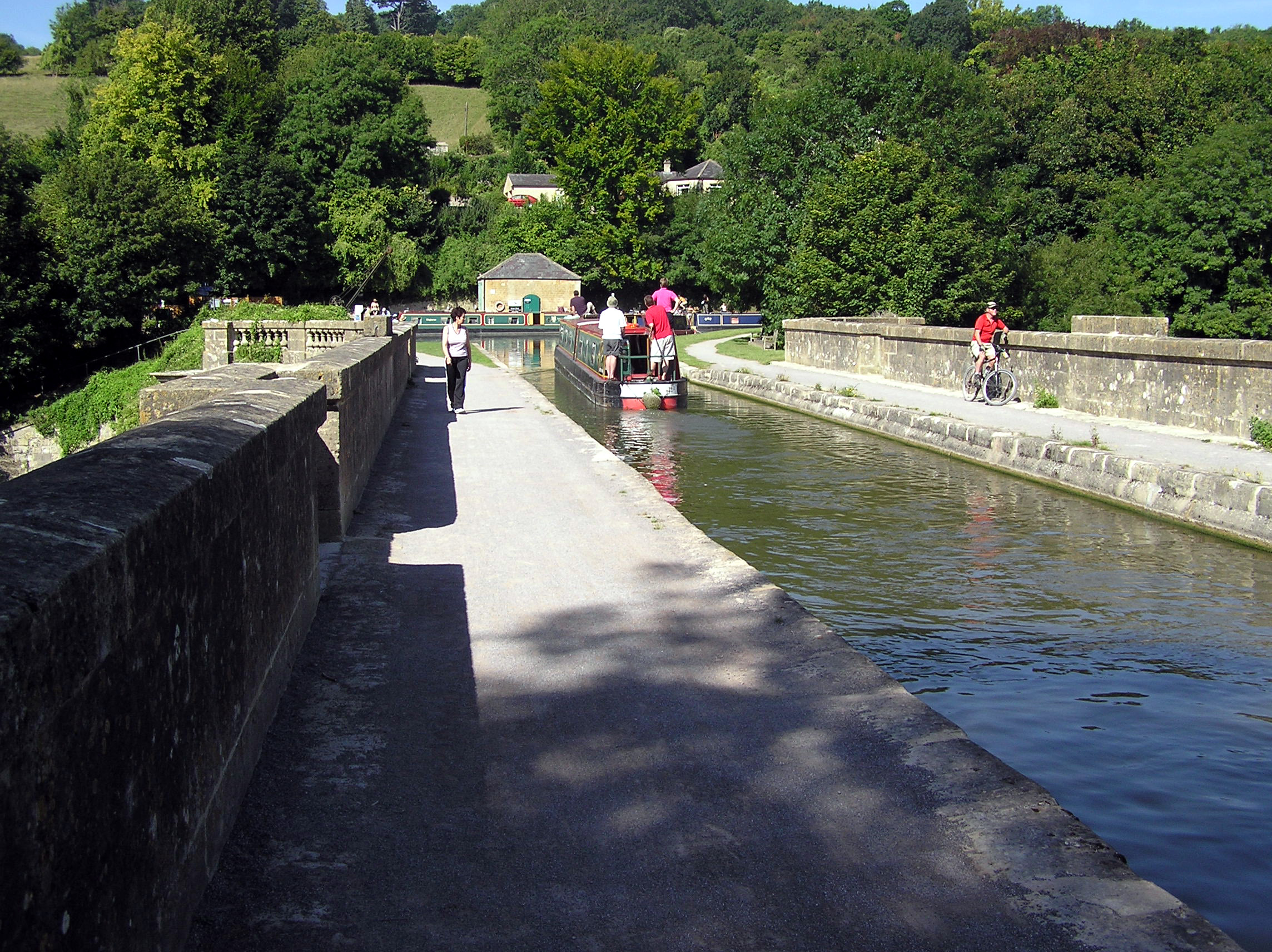
The Dundas Aqueduct on the Kennet and Avon Canal near Limpley Stoke

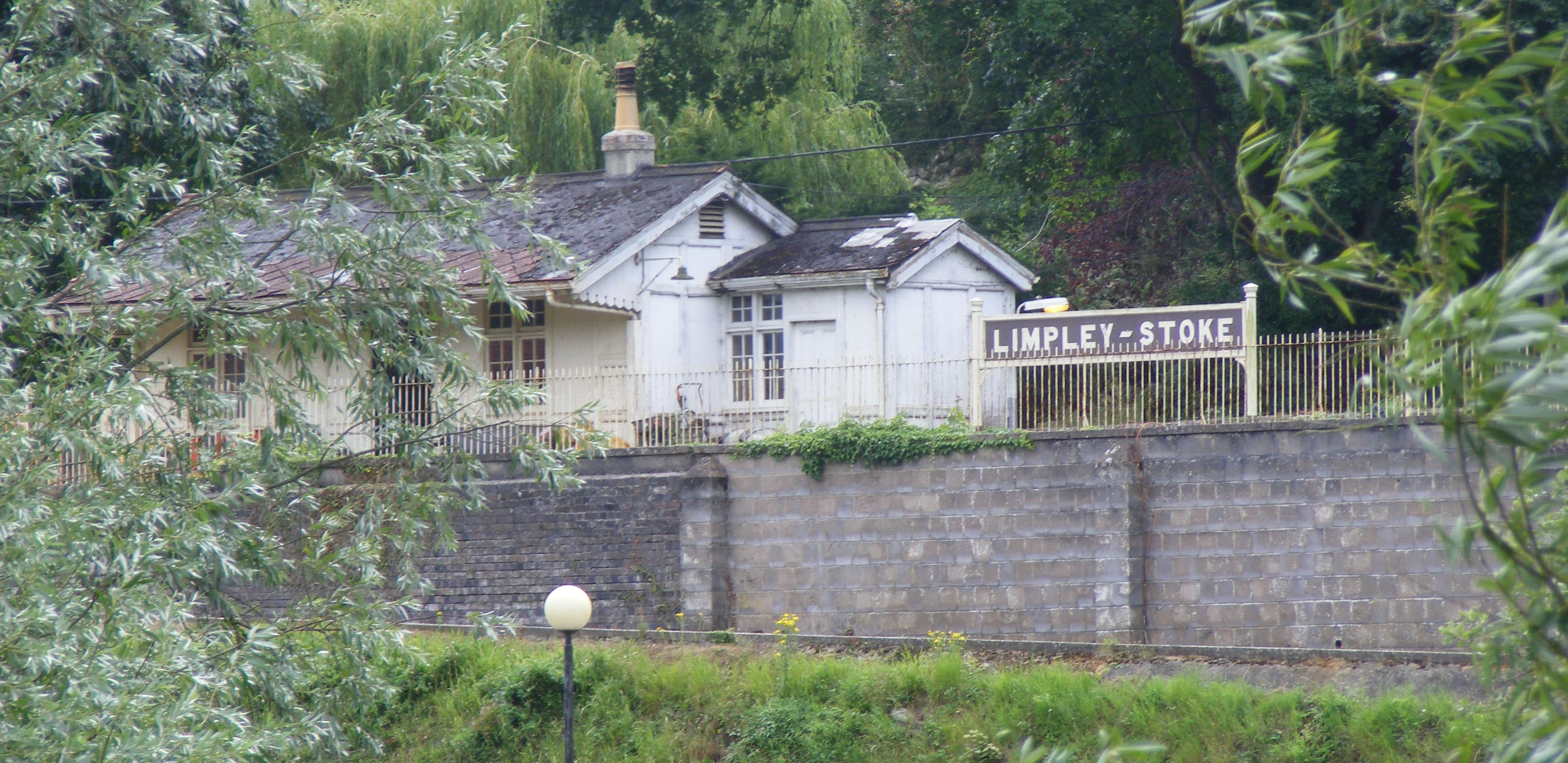
The disused railway station, now privately owned

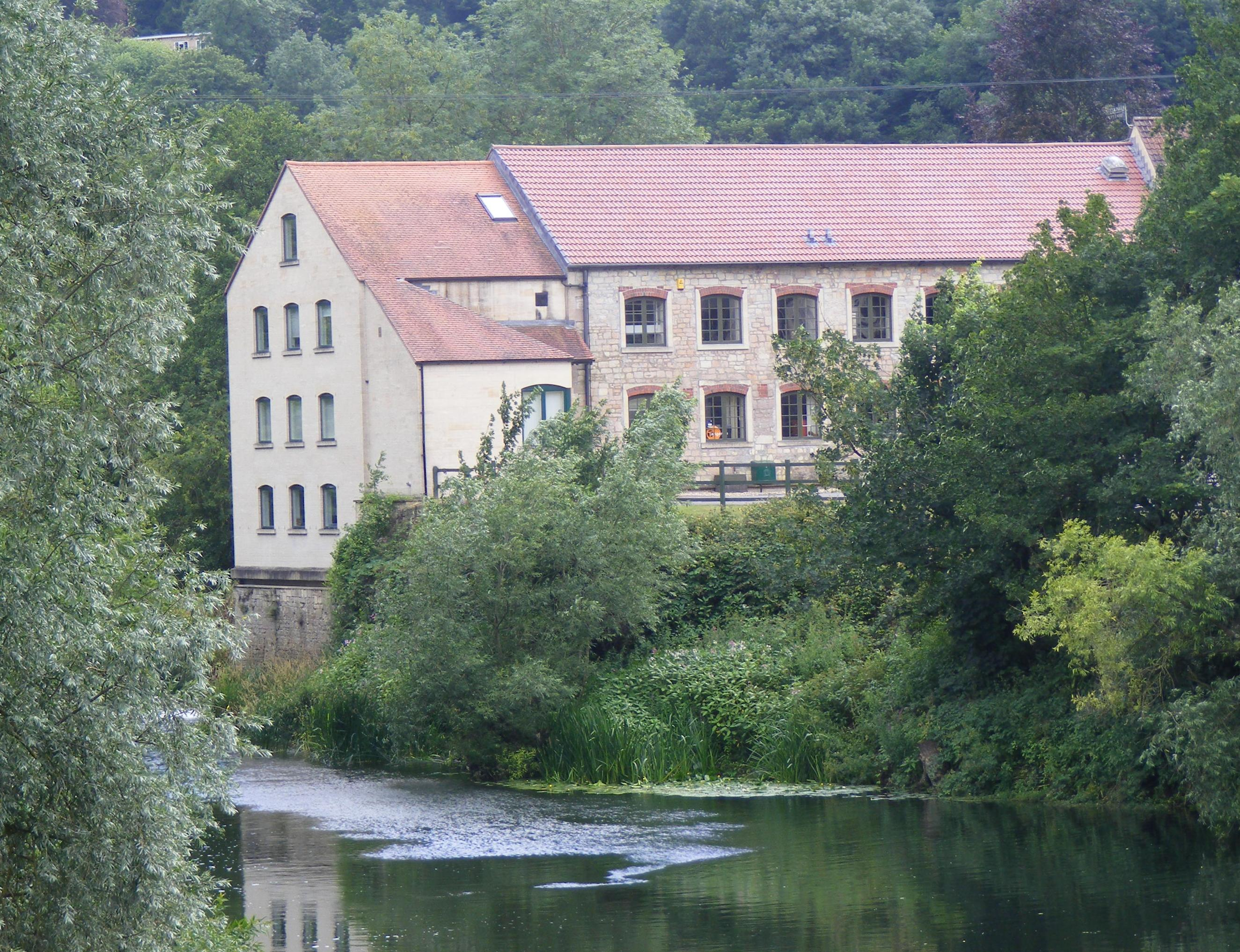
The mill

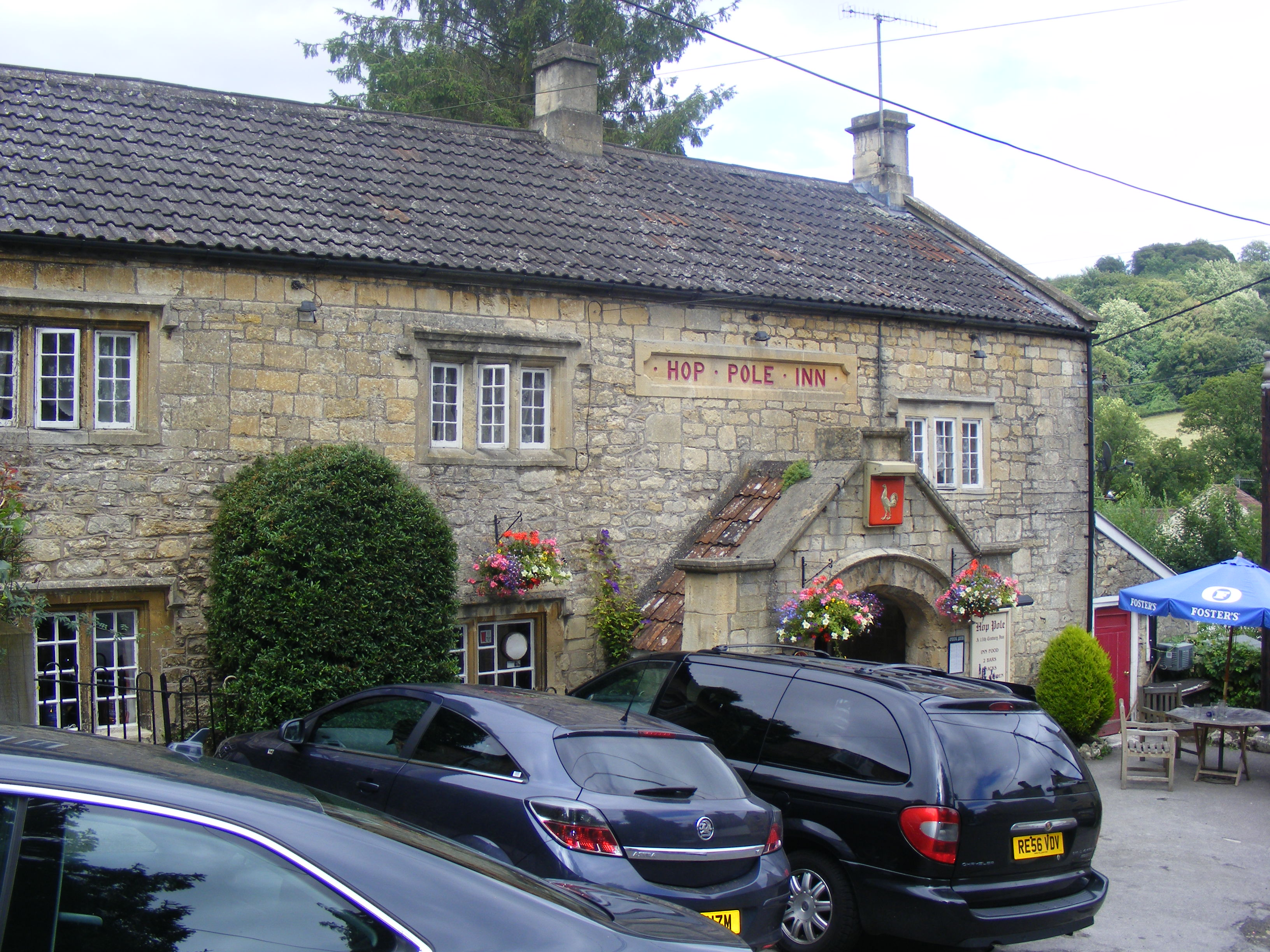
The Hop Pole Inn in 2010

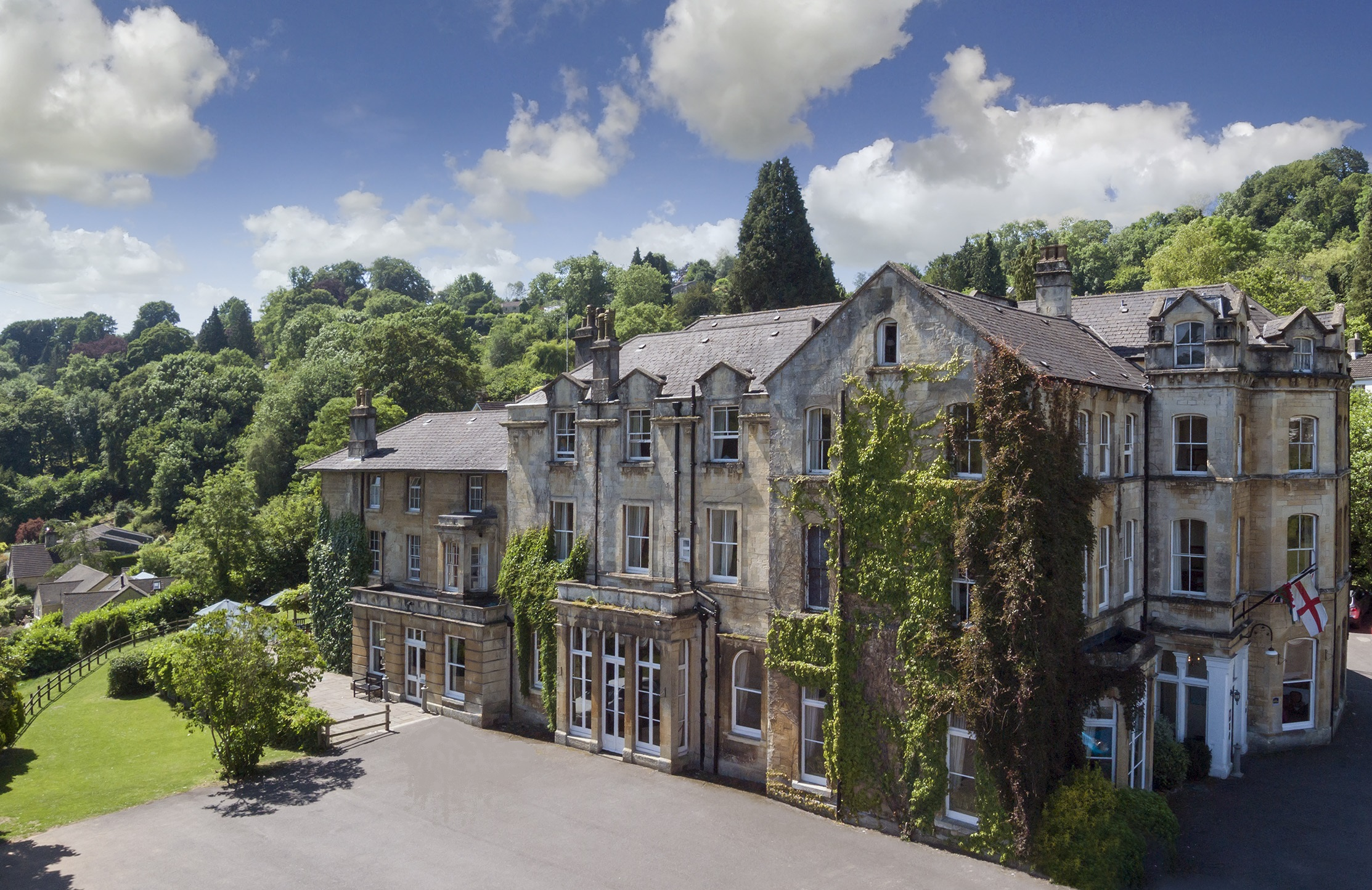
The Limpley Stoke Hotel

== See also ==
Neighbouring civil parishes (clockwise from north):

- Monkton Combe – small Somerset village
- Winsley – small Wiltshire village
- Freshford – Somerset village
- South Stoke – small Somerset village
