= Midford =

Village in Somerset, England

Coordinates: 51.3451°N 2.3454°W

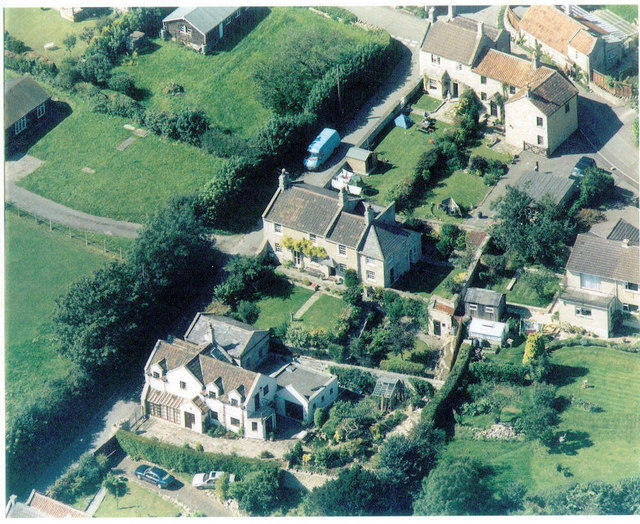
- Aerial view of Midford

- Location within Somerset
- OS grid reference: ST761607
- Unitary authority: Bath and North East Somerset
- Ceremonial county: Somerset
- Region: South West
- Country: England
- Sovereign state: United Kingdom
- Post town: BATH
- Postcode district: BA2
- Dialling code: 01225
- Police: Avon and Somerset
- Fire: Avon
- Ambulance: South Western
- UK Parliament: Frome and East Somerset

Midford is a village approximately 3 miles (5 km) south-south-east of Bath, Somerset, England. Although relatively small, it extends over 2 counties (Wiltshire and Somerset), is part of two unitary authorities (Wiltshire and Bath and North East Somerset) and is part of five parishes (Southstoke, Hinton Charterhouse, Wellow, Freshford and Limpley Stoke). Although all five parishes extend very near to the village centre, most of the residents reside in the parish of Southstoke and are part of the Bath and North East Somerset unitary authority.

The Cam and Wellow Brooks merge in Midford to form the Midford Brook, which then flows down to join the River Avon close to the village of Monkton Combe.

== Railways and canal ==
In the village, straddling the B3110 road, is the disused viaduct of the Somerset and Dorset Joint Railway and close by are the remains of a lesser viaduct that once carried the Somerset Coal Canal, and later the Great Western branch line from Limpley Stoke to Hallatrow. Midford railway station, on the S&DJR line served the village until 1966. That line is now on the route of NCR 24, the Colliers Way.

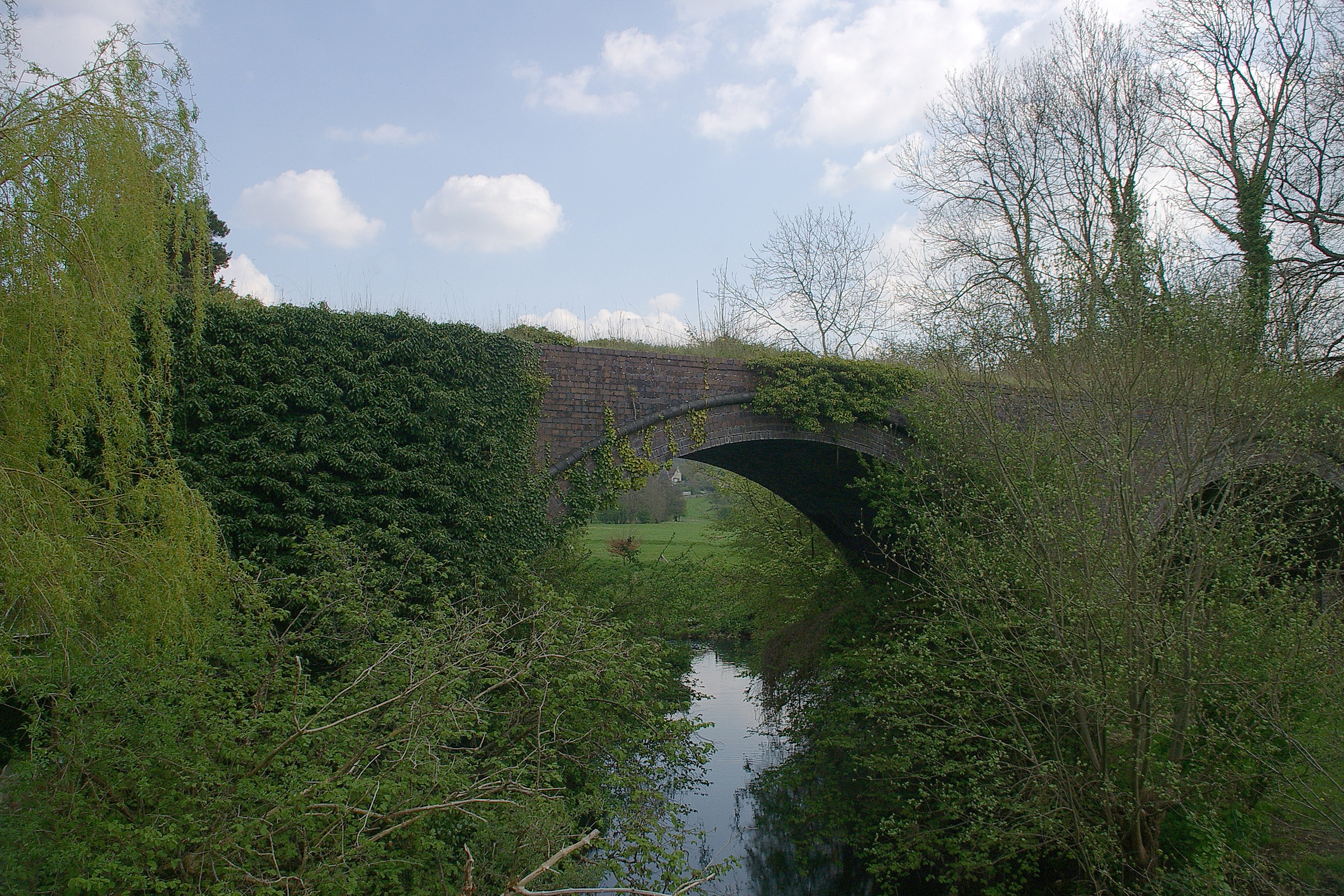
Bristol and North Somerset Railway bridge over Midford Brook

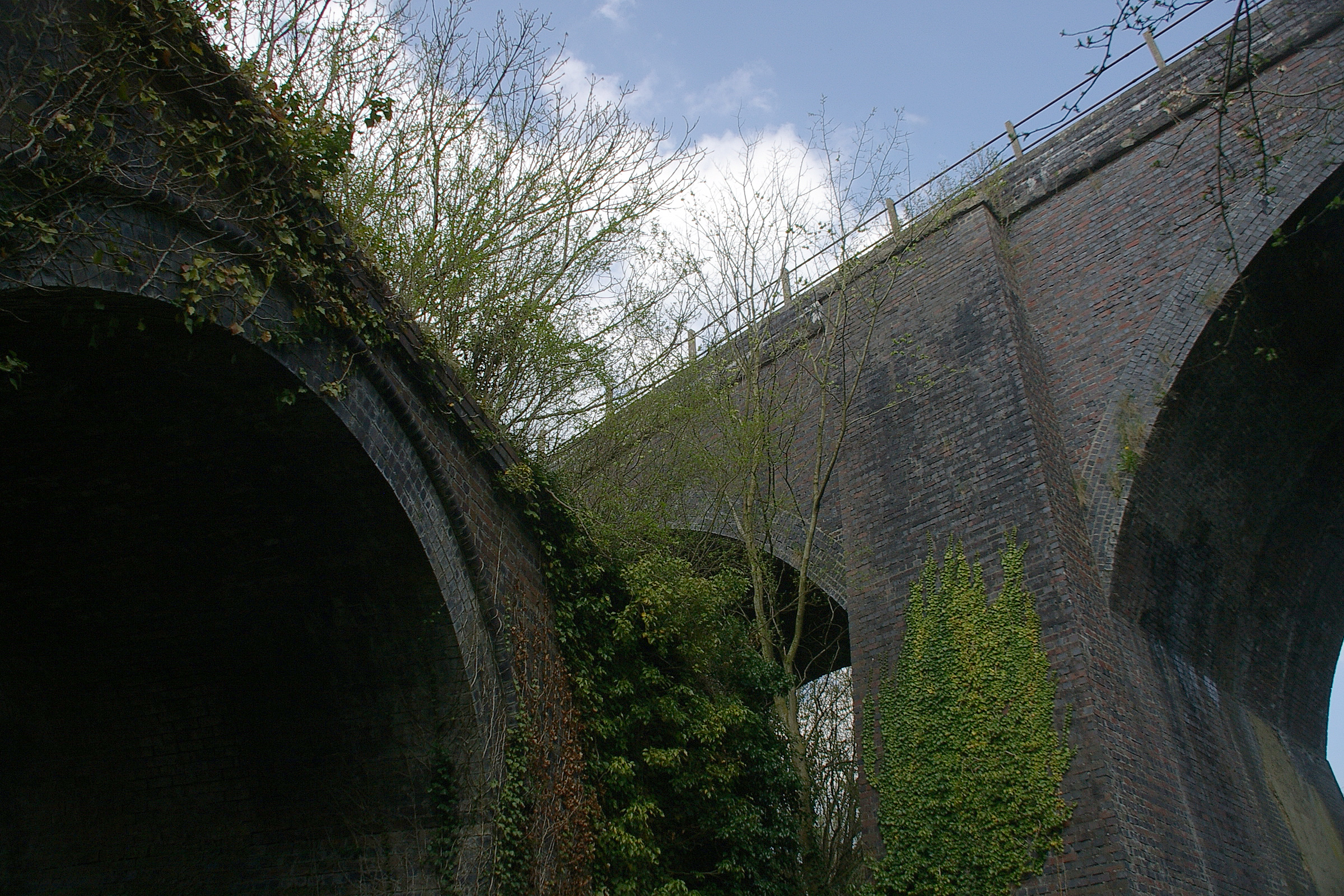
The Somerset and Dorset Joint Railway passes over the Bristol and North Somerset Railway's viaduct on an even taller viaduct.

For about four years from 1911 to 1915, Midford had a second railway station: Midford Halt railway station on the Limpley Stoke to Camerton railway that followed the former Somerset Coal Canal. At Camerton it made an end-on junction with a branch from Hallatrow on the former Bristol & North Somerset Railway. The line was open to passenger traffic for only seven years in all, from 1910 to 1915, and from 1923 to 1925. Midford Halt opened a year late and then did not reopen for the second period. Midford Halt was in Wiltshire; the county boundary runs up to the B3110 road at the point where the canal/railway crossed the road, and the halt was on the Wiltshire side.

== Places of interest ==
On the hillside above Midford is Midford Castle, a late 18th-century folly castle built in the shape of the ace of clubs (♣). The castle was built in 1775 by Henry Disney Roebuck. It was owned by the Briggs family who spent 45 years restoring the castle, before its sale in July 2007, to actor Nicolas Cage for £5 million. It changed hands again in 2009.

To the west of the village is upper Midford. Here in 1995 plans were made to create a new plantation to be known as Millennium wood. In 2000, land between Midford, Southstoke, and Combe Hay was prepared and planted with a variety of native trees and shrubs. This is open to the public all year round and is crossed by several public footpaths. The site overlooks the Cam brook and the restored remains of the Somerset Coal Canal as well as the 40-foot-high (12 m) viaduct built in 1874 that carried the Somerset & Dorset Railway line across the valley.

To the east of Midford village along the restored canal bed and towpath is Packhorse bridge, now closed to foot traffic but still intact. Further along the towpath is the fully restored Midford Aqueduct. A lottery grant and other funding was made available to local volunteers and building professionals who completed the work in 2001 at a cost of £1,000,000. It was the most substantial single structure built during the late 18th century Somerset Coal Canal project and was officially opened in 1803. The railway lines that meet and cross each other in the village were the site of the opening scene in the classic 1950s British comedy film, the Titfield Thunderbolt.

== Fuller's earth in Horsecombe Vale ==
In 1883 George Dames and his brother Charles Richard Dames leased land in Horsecombe Vale from the Midford Castle estate and opened a mine and processing works for Fuller's earth. The mines extended nearly 20 acres (8.1 ha) through four adits. In 1915 the works was taken over by the Fuller's Earth Union and despite geological problems continued until the end of World War II. At the bottom of the valley was the pan grinding works where water from Horsecombe Brook was used to make a slurry from which sand settled at the bottom of troughs. The slurry then passed through an earthenware pipe to Tucking Mill just beyond Midford, where a second stage of sedimentation took place.

== Transport links ==
Midford is one of the starting points for a project by Sustrans (sustainable transport) organisation to link with an existing cycle route to the City of Bath via the Two Tunnels Greenway. The project has re-opened the old Devonshire and Combe Down railway tunnels to make the new link.

== Local amenities ==
There is one public house in the village: the Hope and Anchor which is on the main road leading into the village, adjacent to the railway bridge and cycle path route.
