= Midford Brook =

River in Somerset, England

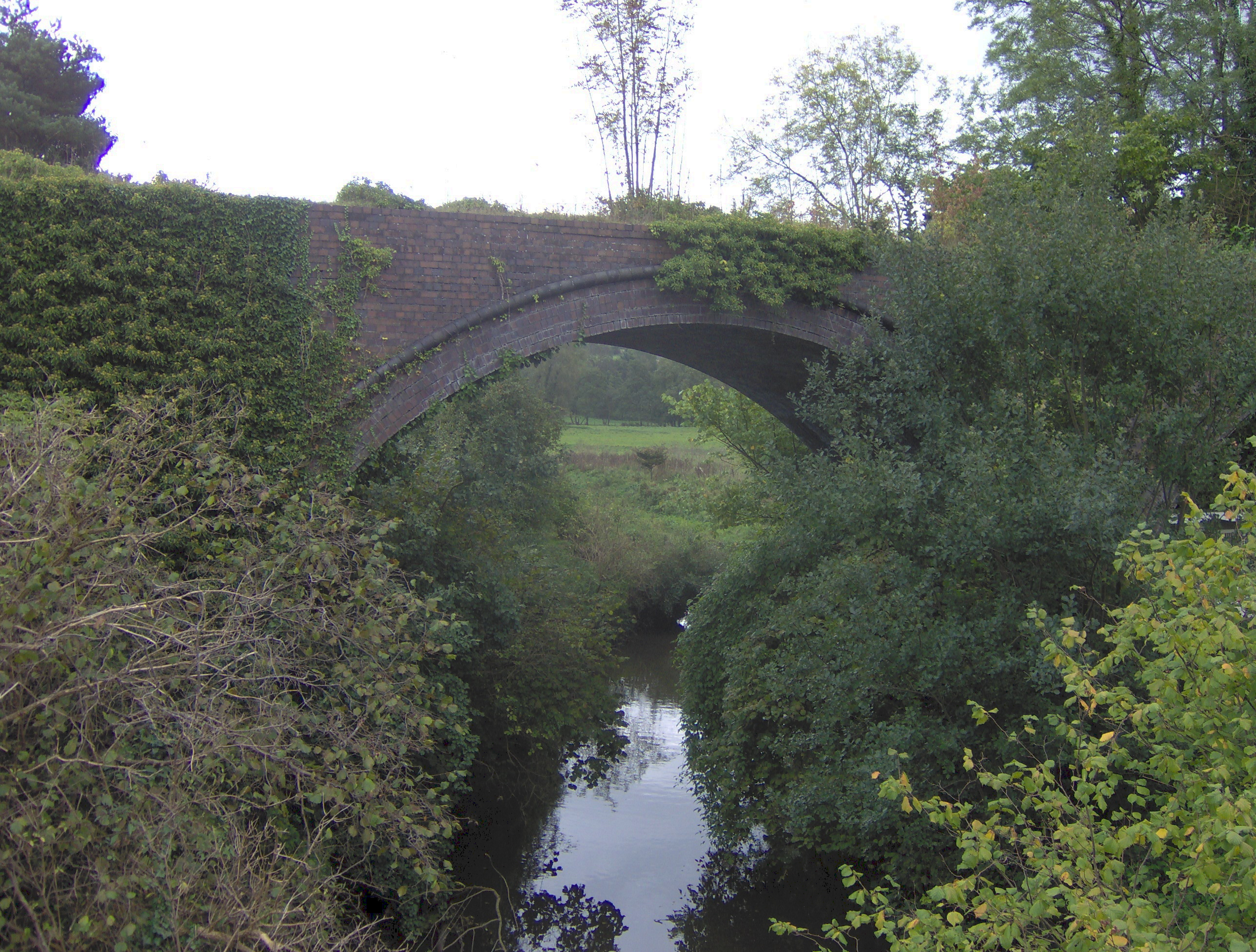
- Railroad viaduct over Midford Brook at Midford

Location
- Country: England
- County: Somerset
- District: Bath and North East Somerset

Physical characteristics
- Source: Wellow Brook & Cam Brook
  - location: Midford, Bath and North East Somerset, Somerset, England
  - coordinates: 51°20′27″N 2°20′32″W
- Mouth: River Avon
  - location: Dundas Aqueduct
  - coordinates: 51°21′40″N 02°18′36″W

Midford Brook is a small river in Somerset, England.

It is formed by the convergence of the Wellow Brook and Cam Brook at Midford. It passes Tucking Mill and joins the River Avon close to the Dundas Aqueduct and the remains of the Somerset Coal Canal. For its entire length it defines the boundary between Bath & North East Somerset and Wiltshire.

Although the Midford Brook is named on Ordnance Survey maps, the Environment Agency does not recognise it, instead identifying the Wellow Brook as continuing to the Avon.

The Midford Brook has a catchment area of 147.4 km^{2} which is largely over impermeable Lias. The deep steep-sided valley means that it responds rapidly to rainfall.
