= Somerset Coal Canal =

Canal in Somerset, England

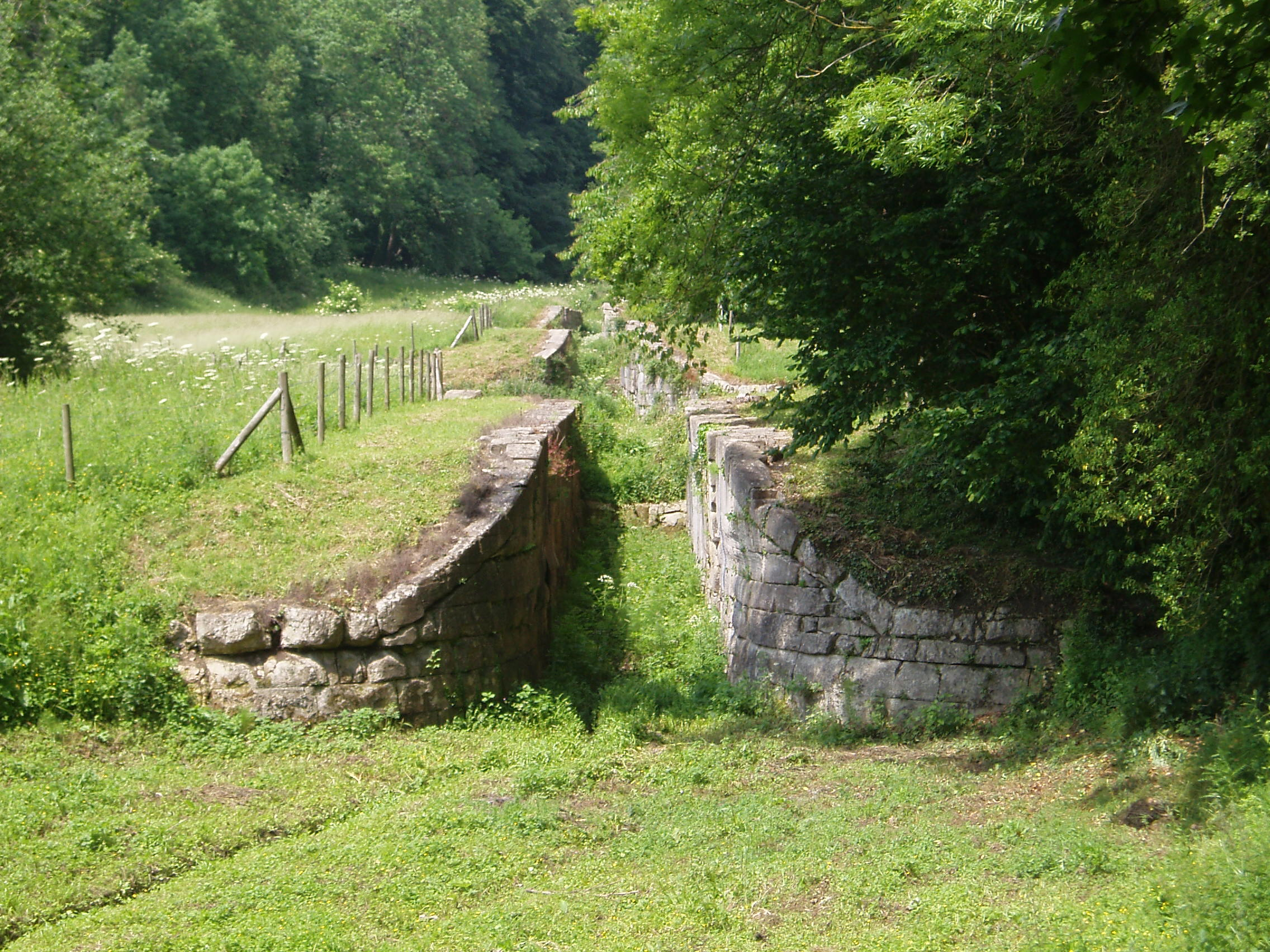
- Disused locks at the Combe Hay flight

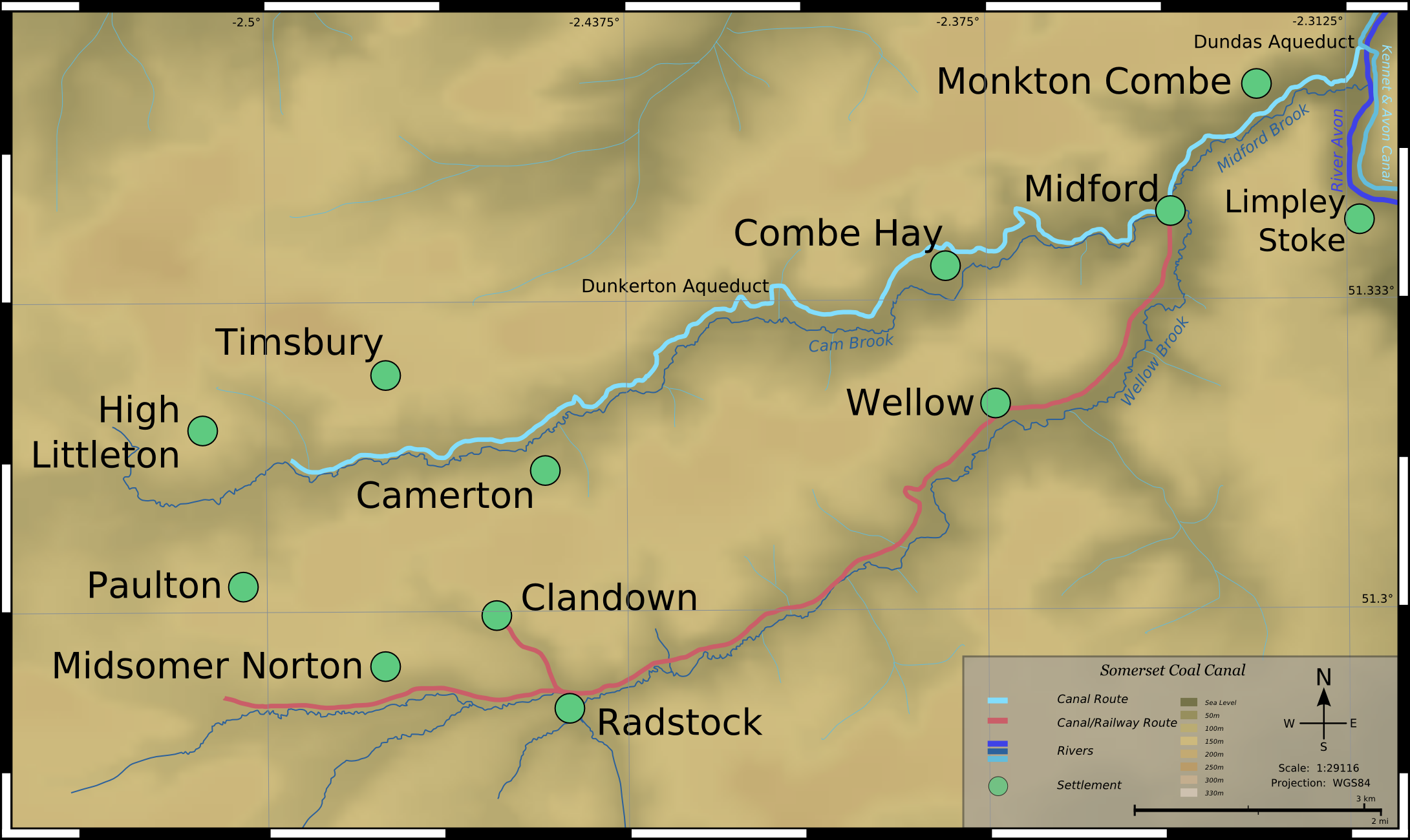
- Map of the Somerset Coal Canal

Specifications
- Length: 10.6 miles (17.1 km) (Length of Paulton branch)
- Maximum boat beam: 7 ft 0 in (2.13 m)
- Locks: 23
- Status: Under restoration

History
- Former names: Somersetshire Coal Canal
- Principal engineer: William Jessop; William Smith
- Construction began: 1795
- Date of first use: 1798
- Date completed: 1805
- Date closed: 1898
- Date restored: 2012–present

Geography
- Start point: Paulton / Timsbury
- End point: Dundas Aqueduct
- Connects to: Kennet and Avon Canal

The Somerset Coal Canal (originally known as the Somersetshire Coal Canal) was a narrow canal in England, built around 1800. Its route began in basins at Paulton and Timsbury, ran to nearby Camerton, over two aqueducts at Dunkerton, through a tunnel at Combe Hay, then via Midford and Monkton Combe to Limpley Stoke where it joined the Kennet and Avon Canal. This link gave the Somerset coalfield (which at its peak contained 80 collieries) access east toward London. The longest arm was 10.6 miles (17.1 km) long with 23 locks. From Midford an arm also ran via Writhlington to Radstock, with a tunnel at Wellow.

A feature of the canal was the variety of methods used at Combe Hay to overcome height differences between the upper and lower reaches: initially by the use of caisson locks; when this method failed an inclined plane trackway; and finally a flight of 22 conventional locks.

The Radstock arm was never commercially successful and was replaced first with a tramway in 1815 and later incorporated into the Somerset and Dorset Joint Railway. The Paulton route flourished for nearly 100 years and was very profitable, carrying high tonnages of coal for many decades; this canal helped carry the fuel that powered the nearby city of Bath.

By the 1880s, coal production declined as the various pits either ran out of coal or were flooded and then closed. In 1896 the main pump at Dunkerton, which maintained the canal water level, failed. The resultant lowering in level meant that only small loads could be transported, which reduced revenue, thus the canal company could not afford a replacement pump.

The canal became disused after 1898 and officially closed in 1902, being sold off to the various railway companies who were expanding their networks.

In September 2014, restoration work began on the canal section from Paulton to Radford, with the aim of restoring the northern branch from Paulton for navigation in the future. The largest canal drydock in England has been revealed at Paulton and culverts and bridges nearby are being reinstated or rebuilt;. About 2/3 mile (1 km) of canal from Paulton to Radford was re-watered in mid-2015, but a leak resulted in that section drying out again.

== History ==
=== Background ===
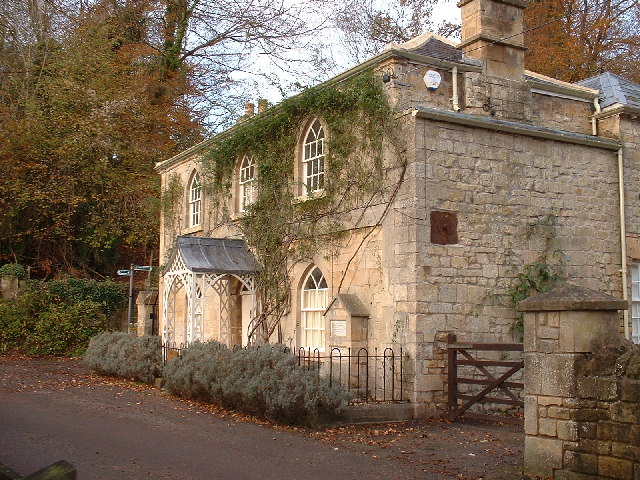
House at Tucking Mill, next to the canal, reputedly lived in by William Smith

The Somerset coalfield had been producing coal since at least 1437, when the main source was a pit at Kilmersdon. By the early 1500s, additional pits had been opened at Clutton, High Littleton and Stratton-on-the-Fosse. There were also mines at Farrington Gurney, Midsomer Norton and Paulton by 1678, but no mining activity at Radstock. This changed in 1793, when an exploratory shaft found coal seams at varying depths below the village, which led to a flurry of new mines opening at Dunkerton, Foxcote, Priston, Timsbury and Writhlington. For all of the pits, transport was a major problem because of the poor state of the roads. The cost of getting the coal to market, and the threat of cheaper coal from south Wales as a result of the opening of the Monmouthshire Canal, which was then under construction, led to the proposal for a canal which could transport Somerset coal to Bath and Wiltshire.

Initial surveys were conducted during 1793 by William Jessop and William Smith under the direction of John Rennie who presented a report on 14 October 1793 estimating the cost of construction of the canal at £80,000. Smith, who also worked at the Mearns Pit at High Littleton, made the original observations leading to his important stratification theory by observing the dips in the geological strata through which the canal was cut. Smith became Surveyor to the company, but was dismissed in April 1799, apparently because he had used his position as surveyor to buy a local house at advantageous terms. He then set himself up in a private practice in Bath but was re-engaged by the company in 1811, to provide advice when repairs became necessary to the canal bed.

Somersetshire Coal Canal Act 1794
- Act of Parliament
- Parliament of Great Britain
- Long title: An Act for making and maintaining a navigable Canal, with certain Railways, and Stone roads, from several Collieries, in the county of Somerset, to communicate with the intended Kennet and Avon Canal, in the parish of Bradford, in the county of Wilts.
- Citation: 34 Geo. 3. c. 86
- Territorial extent: Great Britain

Dates
- Royal assent: 17 April 1794
- Commencement: 17 April 1794 (Note: The Acts of Parliament (Commencement) Act 1793.)
Other legislation
Amended by	Somersetshire Coal Canal Navigation Act 1802

Status: Amended

Text of statute as originally enacted

As there were no serious objections to the plans, passage through Parliament was smooth, and the canal was authorised by an act of parliament, the Somersetshire Coal Canal Act 1794 (34 Geo. 3. c. 86), which received Royal Assent on 17 April 1794. It was entitled "An Act for making and maintaining a navigable Canal, with certain Railways and Stone Roads, from several Collieries in the county of Somerset, to communicate with the intended Kennet and Avon Canal, in the parish of Bradford, in the county of Wilts". Rennie then had doubts about his original route, and suggested it should be constructed at a higher level, to avoid a long tunnel at Combe Hay. William Jessop was asked to check the new route, and with Rennie gave it his approval, assuring the committee that there was an adequate water supply for the change.

Further detailed surveys were carried out by Robert Whitworth and John Sutcliffe, while the committee sent Samborne Palmer and Richard Perkins, accompanied by Smith, on a 900-mile (1,400 km) fact-finding tour of the canals, inclined planes and tramroads of England and Wales, to help them decide whether to construct a canal with inclined planes or railroads. After they reported their findings on 3 October 1794, the committee decided to proceed with a canal or railway. Sutcliffe was then appointed as chief engineer, and in January 1795 the committee finally agreed that a canal would be better than a railway. Its route was not resolved until they obtained a second act, the Somerset Canal Act 1796 (36 Geo. 3. c.46), which authorised variations to the route defined in the original act.

=== Construction ===
In May 1795, tenders were invited for the first sections to be built from Paulton to Hopyard, Camerton and from Radstock Bridge to Peglinch in Wellow. An estimate by the contractor Houghton & Son from Shropshire was accepted and work began. Part of the Paulton route was sufficiently advanced that five boats carried coal from Dunkerton to Camerton on 1 October 1798, some of which was then delivered by road to Bath.

On the northern branch to Paulton, there was a difference in levels of 135 feet (41 m) to be overcome, and this was concentrated at Combe Hay Locks. Rather than use a flight of around 23 conventional locks, the committee elected to use vertical boat lifts. Perkins and Palmer had seen various lifts during their fact-finding tour, but most were designed for small boats, whereas they wanted one that could transport full-length narrow boats. They considered building railway inclined planes, and using railways rather than canals for the upper levels on both branches. However, in 1794 Robert Weldon proposed using his vertical lift, known at the time as a hydrostatic lock but later called a caisson lock. The Kennet and Avon Canal agreed to fund one quarter of the cost of an experimental lift, and Weldon was asked to build it on the Radstock branch, but the site was later changed to Combe Hay. If it worked, Weldon would be paid £200 for use of his patent, but nothing if it failed.

Weldon had built a model of his design at Oakengates, next to the Shropshire Canal. He started work on the first of three caisson locks which would be required at Combe Hay in early 1796. A narrow boat laden with 20 or 30 tons of cargo would be floated into an airtight wooden box, which was submerged in water in a stone-built cistern. The buoyancy of the box counterbalanced the weight of the boat and its cargo, and the box could be moved up and down by racks and pinions. Construction continued throughout 1796 and 1797. Meanwhile, tenders were awarded for building the canal from Midford to Limpley Stoke, and the junction with the Kennet and Avon Canal. During the first trial of the caisson lock in February 1798, the rack and pinion mechanism broke. After repairs were made, another trial took place in June 1798, when a boat was successfully lowered the 46 feet (14 m) down the lift, and raised back to the upper level. Weldon pledged that he would demonstrate the lock by using it to transfer 1,500 tons in 12 hours, using just a lift operator and a boatman. The committee decided to build two more lifts, one at Combe Hay and one at Radford, but no work was undertaken until the final trial had been completed. It never was, as there were repeated failures, and the committee started to consider other options.

Three successful trials of the caisson lock were made in April 1799, but the walls of the chamber started to bulge. The Bath Herald reported that the leakage from the cistern was so bad that the lock could only be used for three or four hours before trials had to be abandoned. While they blamed the masons who had built the faulty cistern, it was probably the ground in which the cistern was built that caused the problems. It was built through Lower Fuller's Earth clay, a material that is notorious for expanding when wet, and this would have exerted enormous pressure on the cistern walls. At the time, the process of making waterproof cement was also in its infancy. These two factors caused the walls of the cistern to bulge inwards, resulting in the caisson jamming. Smith may have known of the problem, since he had visited Sapperton Tunnel on the Thames and Severn Canal in 1788 and 1794, which was distorting where it was cut through Fuller's Earth. After years of fruitless searching for the site of the lock, an archaeological dig in 1997 confirmed its likely location, following the discovery in the Public Records Office of a map dating from 1804-1806 showing the caisson and its exit tunnel.

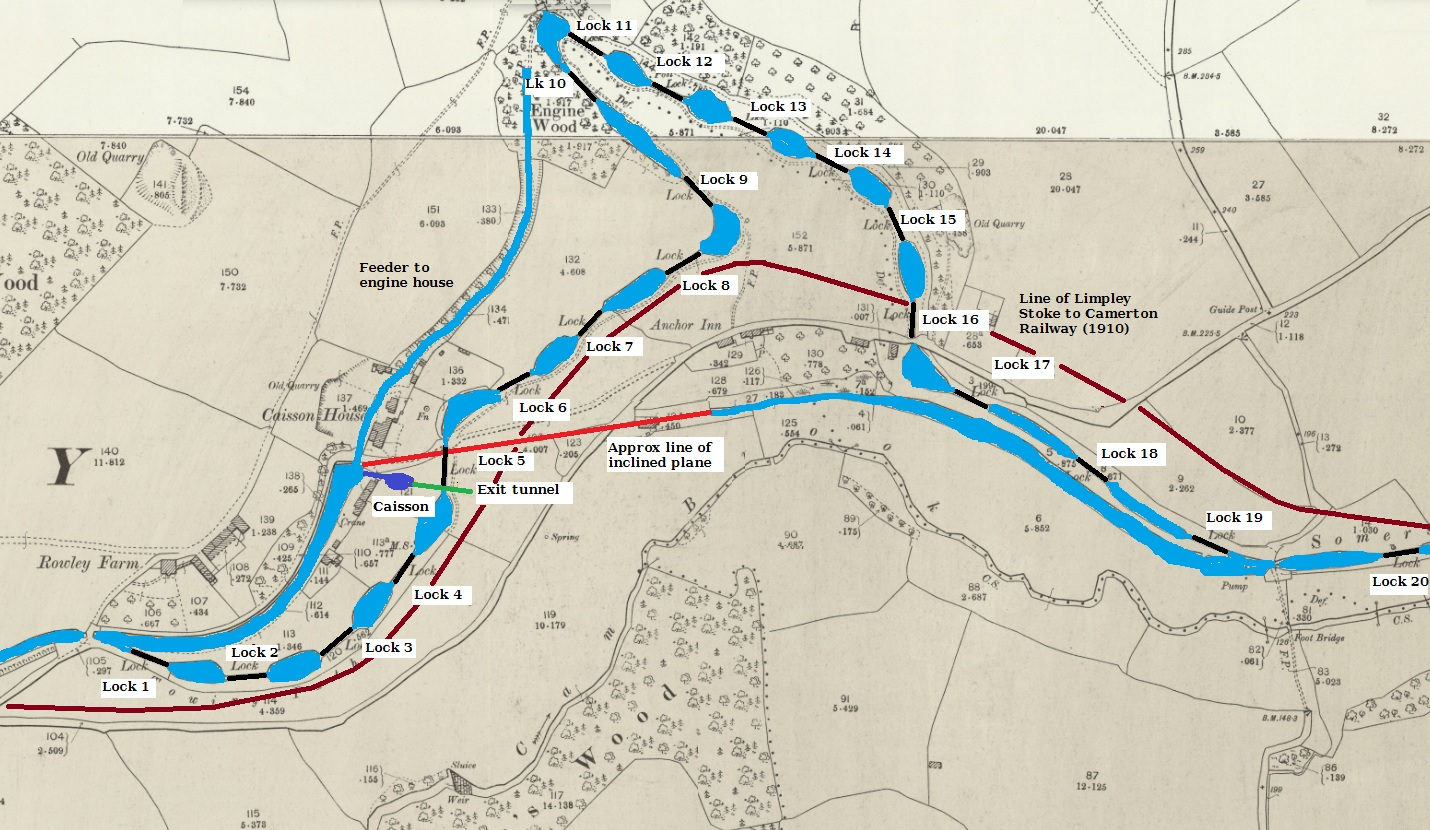
Map showing the Combe Hay locks, with the line of the inclined plane, caisson, exit tunnel, and the Limpley Stoke to Camerton Railway, based on 1904 OS map

Nobody responded to a call for tenders in 1799 to rebuild the lift and to build the others. In the same year William Whitmore and his partner, Norton, offered to build a balance (or geometrical) lift without payment, on condition that if successful they were to have £17,300 and a royalty of 4 pence per ton on goods passed. Sutcliffe suggested that it was a better design than the caisson lock, but was unsure that it could be built large enough to handle boats of 24 tons. He was also aware that James Fussell was building a similar lift on the Dorset and Somerset Canal, and recommended that they wait to see how successful that was. Benjamin Outram was asked for advice, and suggested that the colliery railways should be rebuilt as plateways, to take much larger trucks, which could then be shipped down the canal on rafts, which would be 90 by 9 feet (27.4 by 2.7 m) and would carry 12 trucks. The trucks would then be lowered down a plateway incline to more rafts on the lower levels, or the coal could be loaded into boats.

Sutcliffe was critical of this suggestion, as it would require the canal to be widened, and he thought Outram had grossly underestimated the cost of the work. He advocated a flight of locks at Combe Hay and Radford. Outram then suggested that railway inclines could be built at both locations, with coal carried in boxes on the boats, which would be transferred to the railways by crane. The inclines would be counter-balanced, with full boxes descending being used to raise empty boxes or boxes part-loaded with other commodities. This solution was adopted, and three locks were built below the Combe Hay inclined plane to lower the canal to the Midford level. The plane was not a success, with the Kennet and Avon company complaining that the coal was damaged by the transfer, and the Wilts & Berks Canal company complaining that the transfer was slow and costly. The committee therefore decided to build a flight of 19 locks at Radford, and an additional 19 at Combe Hay.

Somersetshire Coal Canal Navigation Act 1802
- Act of Parliament
- Parliament of the United Kingdom
- Long title: An Act for enabling the Company of Proprietors of the Somersetshire Coal Canal Navigation, to vary and alter the Lines of the said Canal; to raise Money for completing the said Canal and Works; and to alter and amend the Powers and Provisions the several Acts passed for making the said Canal.
- Citation: 42 Geo. 3. c. xxxv
- Territorial extent: United Kingdom

Dates
- Royal assent: 30 April 1802
- Commencement: 30 April 1802
Other legislation
Amends	Somersetshire Coal Canal Act 1794

Status: Current legislation

Text of statute as originally enacted

They proposed to raise more money to finance the building of the locks, the use of which would incur an additional toll of one shilling per ton on all traffic. This was vigorously opposed by the owners of the Kennet and Avon and the Wilts & Berks, on the grounds that the price of coal to their customers would be too high. After negotiation, the company obtained a new act of Parliament, the Somersetshire Coal Canal Navigation Act 1802 (42 Geo. 3. c. xxxv), on 30 April 1802, which authorised the formation of a separate body called "The Lock Fund of the Somerset Coal Canal Company", with powers to raise the sum of £45,000. The money was raised by the Kennet and Avon, the Wilts & Berks and the Somerset Coal Canal each contributing £15,000, and the one shilling surcharge was to be levied until the capital had been repaid, after which it would cease. William Bennet oversaw the construction of the lock flight, and although the upper canal was connected to the top lock on 5 April 1805, the locks were not used until January 1806.

The delay in using the locks was probably due to the inadequate water supply. Water was pumped into the canal from the Cam Brook at Dunkerton by a double-action pumping engine, but this was insufficient for the 22 locks. A beam engine was obtained from Boulton and Watt of Birmingham which was capable of lifting 5,000 tons of water from the lower level up to the upper level every twelve hours. It was rated at 57.6 hp (43.0 kW), with steam being supplied by two Cornish boilers. The engine house was built large enough to house a second engine and two more boilers, with the first engine actually called No 1 engine. So that the engine would not disturb Colonel Leigh, who probably lived in what is now known as Caisson House, the upper canal was extended for 1 mile (1.6 km) into Engine Wood, where the pump was built. This enabled a supply of coal to be delivered by boat. At some point between 1812 and 1875, the Combe Hay engine was moved to supplement the engine at Dunkerton, but the actual date is not known. The engine house was demolished in the 1890s.

=== Operation ===
By 1806 the main line of the canal was fully operational The 1802 act set the tonnage rates to be charged:

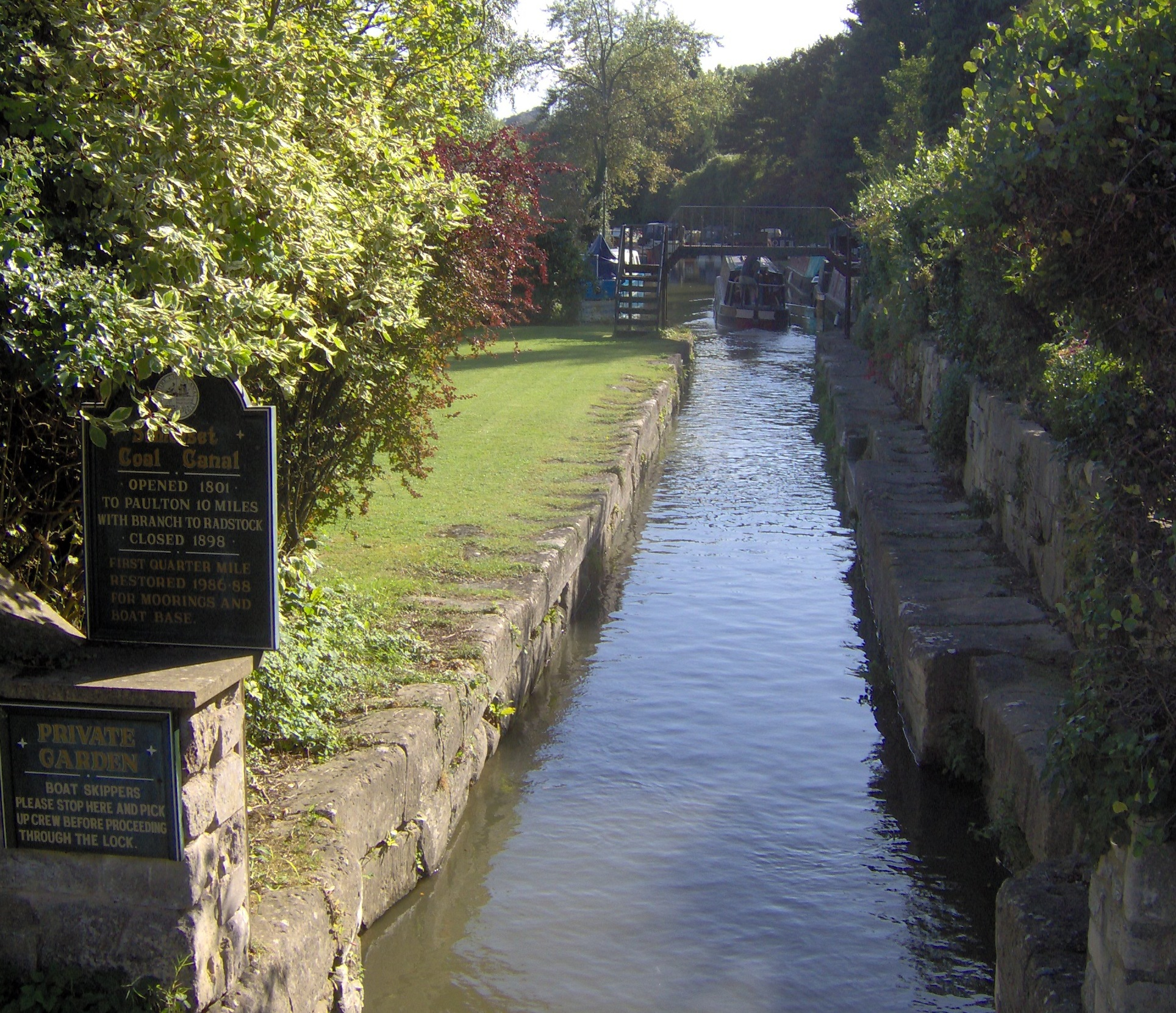
Somerset Coal Canal at Dundas Aqueduct in 2006

Tonnage rates on the Somerset Coal Canal in 1805
Cargo	Rate
For all Coal, Coke, &c	2 1/2d per Ton, per Mile.
For all Iron, Lead, Ores, Cinders, &c	4d ditto. ditto.
For all Stones, Tiles, Bricks, Slate, Timber, &c	3d ditto. ditto.
For all Cattle, Sheep, Swine and other Beasts	4d ditto. ditto.
For all other Goods	4d ditto. ditto.
For every Horse or Ass Travelling on the Railway	1d each.
For every Cow or other Neat Cattle ditto	1/2d ditto. ditto.
For Sheep, Swine and Calves ditto	5d per Score.

Fractions of a Mile to pay for Half a Mile, and of a Ton as a Quarter of a Ton; Rates for Wharfage to be determined by the Company. In addition to the above Rates, One Shilling per Ton is paid on all Goods to the Lock Fund, which also receives Three Farthings per Ton from the Coal Canal company.

The boats were weighed at Midford, where a weigh house was built in 1831, with a roof supported by eight stone Doric columns. It was the first of three built in England and Wales. Boats were floated into a one-ended lock, the gate closed and the water drained. This left the boat resting on a cradle suspended by angled rods attached to a beam which took the weight of the boat. One-pound weights were then added to a pan, with one pound being equivalent to one hundredweight (112 pounds or 51 kilograms), until the system was in equilibrium, when the weight was recorded. The weigh house continued in use until the canal closed and was dismantled in 1914. The other two machines were at Tongwynlais on the Glamorganshire Canal and at Brimscombe Port on the Thames and Severn Canal.

As well as the main trade in coal, the canal was occasionally used for passenger traffic. In 1814, the Benedictine monks who came to Downside Abbey used the canal for the last stage of their journey. The amount of cargo carried was 138,403 tons in 1838, resulting in over £17,000 of tolls being paid. Annual cargoes of over 100,000 tons were common from 1820, and in 1864 reached 157,000 tons, but soon the decline in output from the various Somerset coal pits along with competition from the railways dramatically reduced the canal's profitability, and coal traffic was down to 24,581 tons in 1884.

=== The Radstock branch ===
When the Radstock branch was authorised, it was to terminate at Welton Hollow, near Midsomer Norton, where there was a colliery. However, when construction began, the first contract was for a 2-mile (3.2 km) stretch from the Waldegrave Arms in Radstock to Peglinch (now known at Paglinch), starting around 0.7 miles (1.1 km) to the east of Welton Hollow. Further contracts were issued to extend the canal eastwards to Wellow and Twinhoe, but tenders do not appear to have been advertised for the final section westwards. The first contract included the construction of a road bridge over the canal a very short distance from where it terminated, suggesting that the western extension was still proposed at the time.

The precise location of the terminal wharf at Radstock was unknown until a map dated 1806 was discovered in the Somerset Records Office. The branch was intended to link to the main line of the Paulton branch at Midford, which required the negotiation of a drop of 135 feet (41 m) between the end of the level canal at Twinhoe and Midford. The caisson lock and the inclined plane at Combe Hay had both proved to be unreliable, and no work was carried out on similar structures on the Radstock branch. The 1802 act authorised a flight of 19 locks to be built above Midford, but by the time the flight at Combe Hay had been built, there was insufficient money left to cover the cost of a second flight of locks.

The canal section was around 7 miles (11 km) long, and was filled with water by 1804, when someone drowned after falling into it in January. It is unclear how the water supply was obtained. The Gloucester Journal newspaper reported in April 1805 that one lock had been built on the Radstock arm, and the remaining 18 locks had been replaced by a 1-mile (1.6 km) temporary tramroad. This solution was adopted because of the small volumes of coal produced by the Radstock pits. Midford Basin was connected to the main line by an aqueduct that crossed the Midford Brook. The 1806 map shows three small jetties at the Radstock end of the canal, with tramway tracks running along them, so that coal could be unloaded into boats. There is no evidence that the canal was wide enough to enable boats to turn around, and so they may have been double-ended, with pintles at both ends to allow the rudder to be moved from one end to the other. The Canal Company records for the early period have been lost, and there is scant evidence of traders using the canal. The company did not receive a response to advertisements for a maintenance contract for both branches of the canal in 1810, and when they advertised again in 1812, only the Paulton arm was mentioned.

It is possible that the canal was filled with water by pumping, since an 'engine' is shown on two maps of Radstock, although it was shown on the wrong side of the canal to pump water from the brook. After the canal was converted to a railway, a steam engine was advertised for sale in 1815. It was stated to be in good condition, as it had only worked for two summers.

Transport along the Radstock arm was inefficient. First, coal was brought from the pits to be loaded into boats at Radstock, then it was transferred back to the tramway at Twinhoe, and carried to boats at Midford. In 1814, the Company asked the canal engineer John Hodgkinson for advice, and he suggested that they lay a tramway along the towpath, and dispense with the canal altogether. They followed his counsel, and the tramway construction was completed by July 1815. It consisted of a single line with passing places every 600 yards (550 m), and was level to Twinhoe, where it descended on a 1-in-80 slope to Midford. The gauge was 3 ft 5 1/2 in (1,055 mm), which may have been adopted because it was the same as the tramways at Radstock or the original tramway from Twinhoe to Midford. The canal had operated for at most eight years, and possibly only four or five.

The first railway to affect the canal was the Frome to Radstock line. This was promoted by the Wilts, Somerset and Weymouth Railway, but the company was taken over by the Great Western Railway (GWR) before the line was built. They opened it as a broad gauge (7 ft 1/4 in (2,140 mm)) freight railway in 1854, and although they expected it to benefit from large volumes of coal traffic, the volume of coal carried by the canal continued to increase. In November 1870, the Somerset and Dorset Railway announced that it intended to build a standard gauge line from Limpley Stoke to Radstock, where it would join the Frome to Radstock freight railway. As the Radstock tramway was still using horse traction and the new railway would be in direct competition with it, the canal company decided to sell the tramway to the Somerset and Dorset company. The sale was agreed in February 1871, and the canal company received £20,000, £15,000 in cash and the remainder in shares.

The tramway closed in 1874, once the new railway was completed. As the canal company did not seek legal powers from Parliament to convert the canal to a tramway, the sale of the tramway was technically illegal, but this did not prevent the transfer. The sale included the tramways from Radstock to Welton and Clandown, but not those that served other collieries, which were protected by a clause in the Somerset and Dorset Railway (Extension to the Midland Railway at Bath) Act 1871 (34 & 35 Vict. c. ccv). The Somerset and Dorset Railway issued a prospectus that stated that over 100,000 tons of coal had been carried by the tramway each year, but this was an exaggeration, and the actual figure was around 80,000 tons. There was a break of gauge at Radstock until June 1874, when the Radstock to Frome line was relaid as a standard gauge line.

=== Engineers and surveyors ===
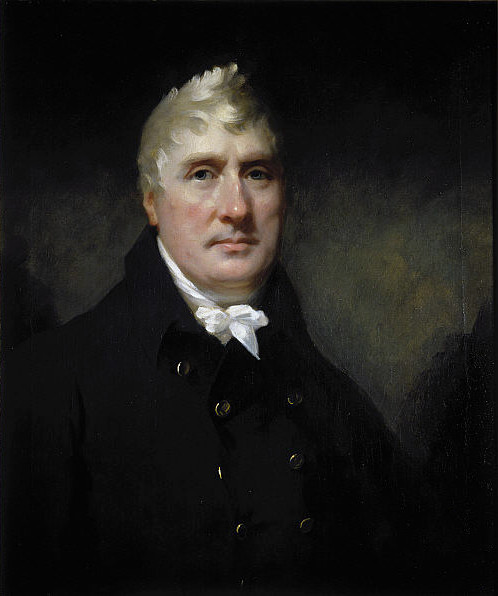
Portrait of John Rennie, 1810, by Sir Henry Raeburn

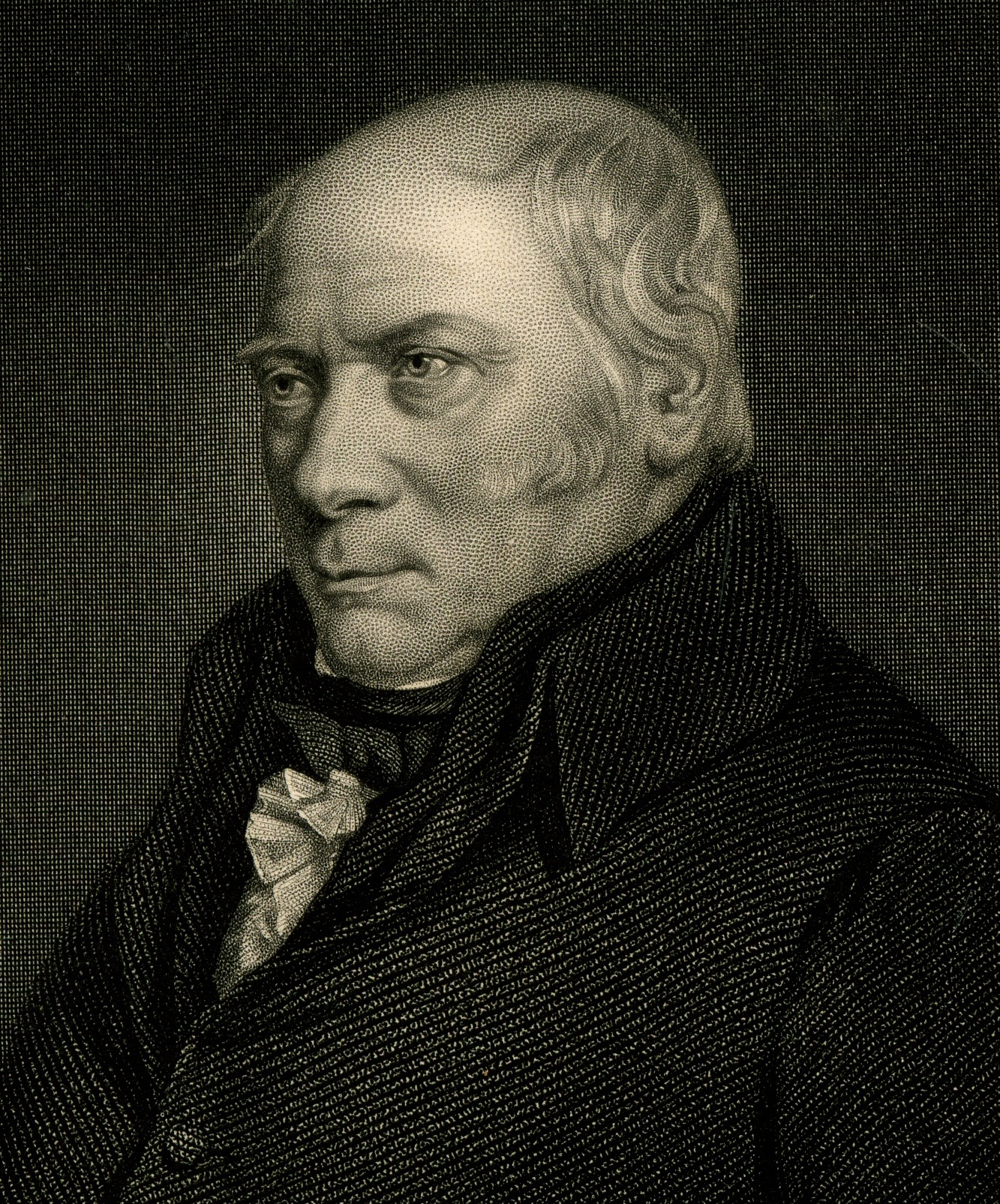
William Smith, undated

- William Bennet (d. 1826)
- John Hodgkinson
- Benjamin Outram (1764–1805)
- John Rennie (1761–1821)
- William Smith (1769–1839)
- John Sutcliffe
- Robert Weldon (?1754–1810)
- Robert Whitworth (d. 1799)

Data from Jim Shead's Waterways Information.

=== Paulton and Timsbury basins ===
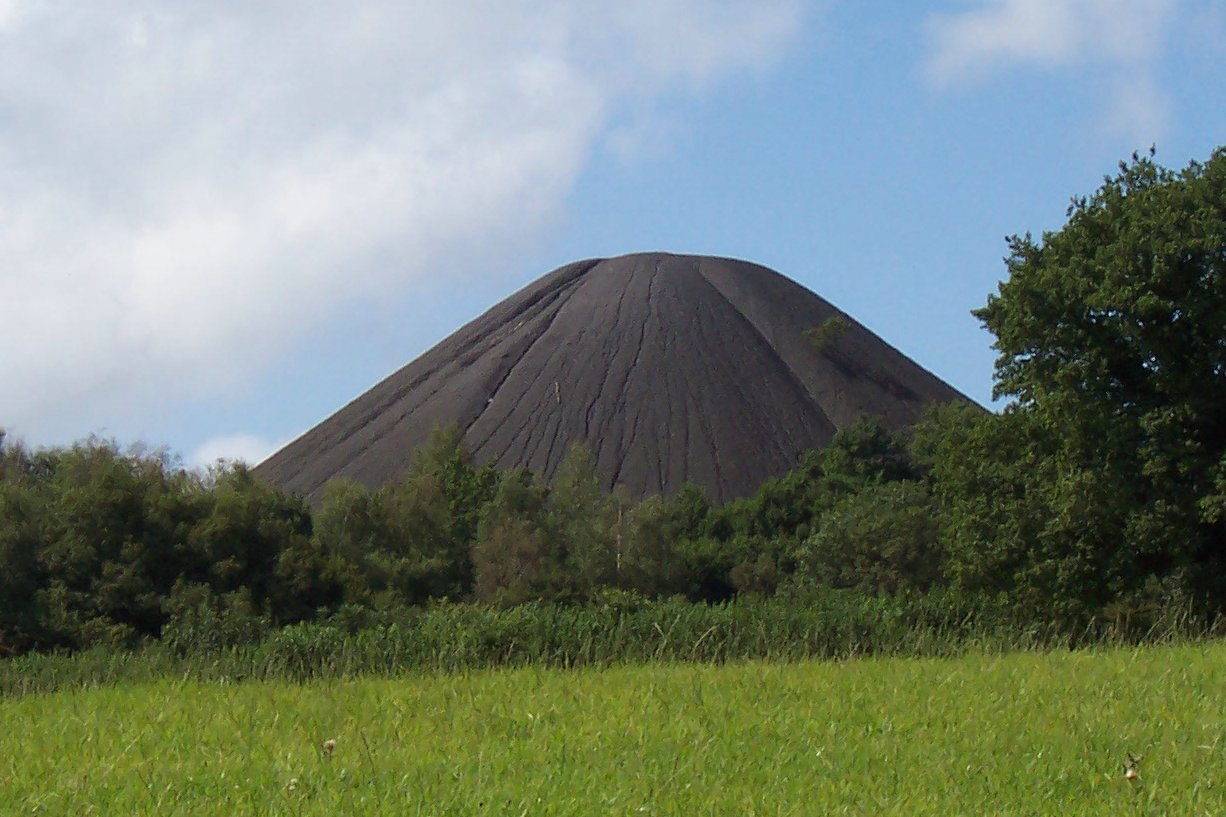
The spoil tip at Paulton in 2006, referred to locally as "The Batch"

The terminus of the northern branch of the Somerset Coal Canal was located between the villages of Paulton and Timsbury. It was a central point for at least 15 collieries around Paulton, Timsbury, and High Littleton, which were connected to the canal by tramroads. 2.97 miles (4.78 km) of tramways connected the pits to the canal. A map discovered at the Waterways Museum at Stoke Bruerne dating from the 1850s shows that seven of the Timsbury and Paulton pits formerly served by the canal had been abandoned by that date.

On the northern side of Timsbury basin was the terminus for the tramroads which served Old Grove, Prior's, Tyning and Hayeswood pits, with a branch line to Amesbury and Mearns pits. Parts of this line were still in use in 1873, probably all carrying horse-drawn wagons of coal. Tramroads on the southern side of the Paulton basin served Brittens, Littlebrook, Paulton Ham, Paulton Hill, and Simons Hill terminating at Salisbury Colliery. In addition the Paulton Foundry used this line. The entire line was disused by 1871 as were the collieries it served.

=== Decline ===
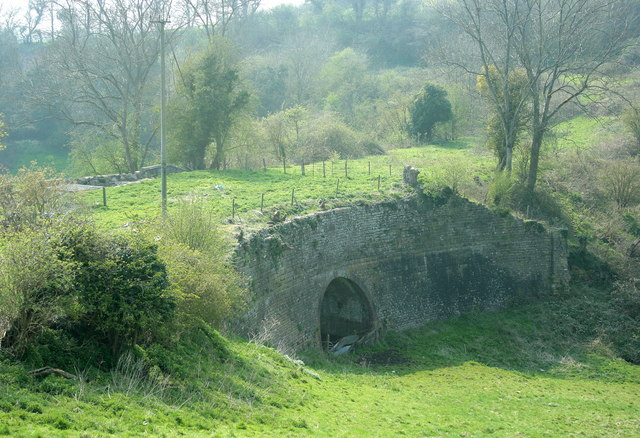
Aqueduct on the Somerset Coal Canal at Dunkerton in 2008

A railway branch line was constructed in 1882 from Hallatrow to Camerton, running alongside the canal for the last 1.5 miles (2 km) of its route. This resulted in a reduction of trade on the canal, although the canal company gained some benefit by selling some land to the railway company. Of the 30 pits that had originally been served by the canal, traffic from 13 of them had been lost when the Radstock tramway was sold, and the opening of the Camerton branch line had resulted in a loss of 75,000 tons per year, which transferred to the railway. The canal was almost exclusively reliant on the collieries for its traffic, and only four of those were still working.

The canal went into liquidation in 1893 but continued to be used, as the pumping engines at Dunkerton were not turned off until 1898. The closure of the canal caused difficulties for the remaining pits which had relied on it for transportation, but most of the traffic transferred to the Camerton Branch.

In 1902 the Board of Trade declared that the canal was derelict and unlikely to be reopened, enabling the Great Western Railway to buy it for £2,000 and formally abandon it in 1904, both actions authorised by the Great Western Railway Act 1904 (4 Edw. 7. c. cxcvii). A branch of the Bristol and North Somerset Railway line was built from Limpley Stoke to Camerton, where it joined the line from Hallatrow, opening in 1910. It carried passengers and freight, but the passenger service was withdrawn during the First World War. This service was briefly reinstated in the 1920s for two years, but the line continued to carry freight, notably from the Camerton Colliery. This closed on 15 April 1950, and the line lasted for less than a year after that, closing on 15 February 1951. The line was used in the 1952 Ealing comedy film The Titfield Thunderbolt, and was dismantled in 1958.

== Restoration ==
The first attempt at any restoration of the canal began in November 1984, when the Somerset Coal Canal Company was set up to restore a short section next to Dundas Aqueduct, for use as moorings. This is known as Brassknocker Basin, and includes a cafe and cycle hire facilities. Bristol Industrial Archaeological Society carried out a detailed mapping survey of the remains in 1987. This revealed that rather more of the canal was still in existence than had formerly been suggested, and so the Avon Industrial Buildings Trust also surveyed the remains on the ground. The mapping survey found that only around 22 percent of the main line had been destroyed by railway construction. Part of the reasons for this was that the canal was on two levels, with a large change in level at Combe Hay, whereas the railway was built on a steady gradient, and so could not follow the line of the canal for much of its 11 miles (18 km). The Radstock Branch was all on one level, and so the railway was able to be built over its course more easily, but still nearly two-thirds of the canal route was unaffected by the railway. Intensive ploughing in the post-war period had resulted in a further ten percent of the canal being lost. When the findings were published, it was thought that restoration of any more than Brassknocker Basin was unlikely because of the fragmented nature of the remaining sections.

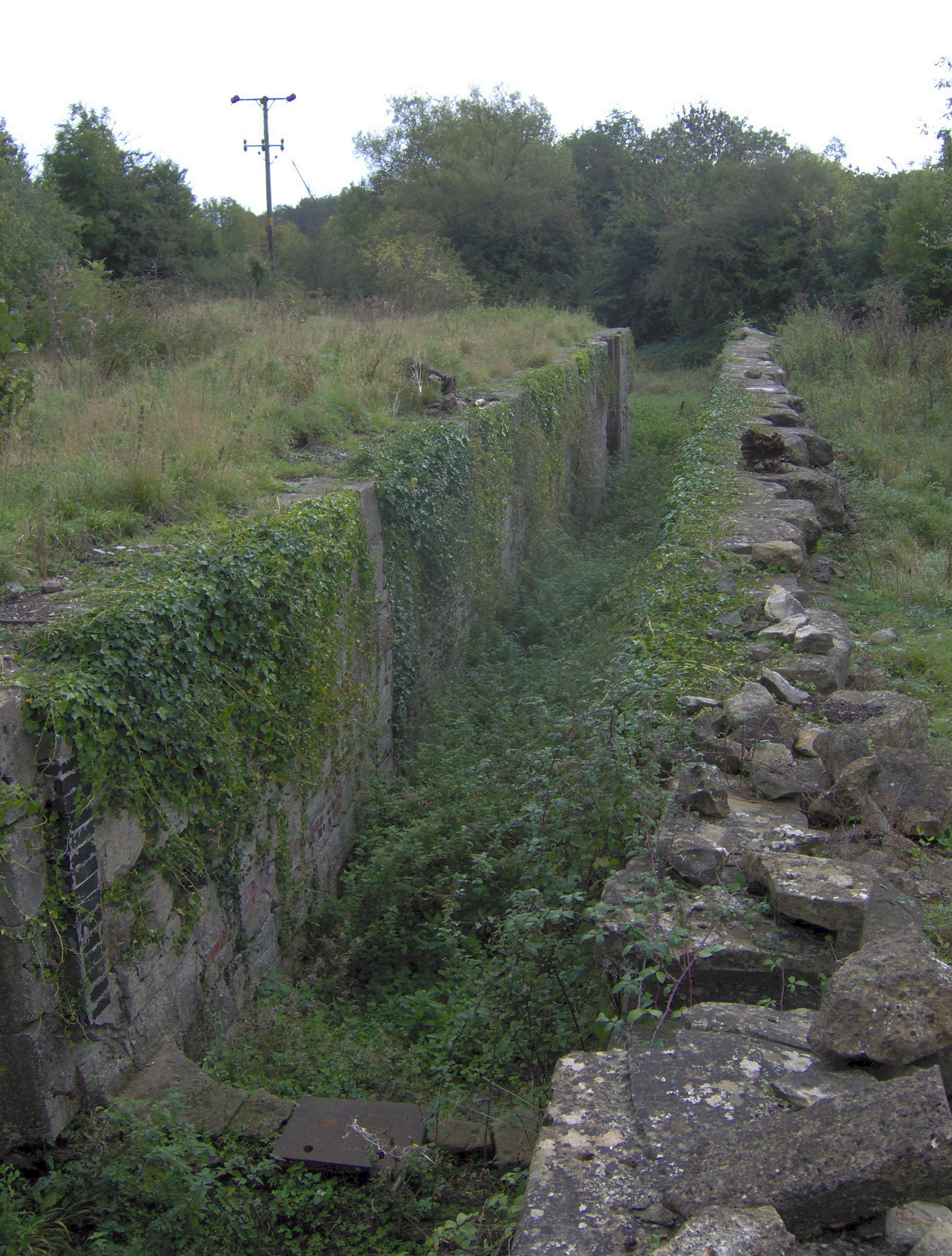
Derelict lock next to Caisson House, Combe Hay in 2006

By 1990, there were still no plans to restore the canal, but Avon Industrial Buildings Trust was suggesting that the Combe Hay Locks and Midford Aqueduct were structures which should be preserved and made accessible to the public. They had been working on some of the structures since the 1980s. The Somerset Coal Canal Society was formed in 1992, initially with the aim ‘to research, document and preserve the canal’. They were one of several societies that supported the Avon Industrial Buildings Trust when they applied for a grant from the Heritage Lottery Fund to restore Midford Aqueduct. The bid was successful, and restoration was completed by 2002. Gradually, ideas changed and in 2008 the constitution of the society was altered to include restoration of the canal.

The route of the canal lies in a largely agricultural area, dotted with small villages linked by minor roads. Prior to 2019, there were a number of footpaths that followed the route of the canal for short distances, but they tended to be disconnected from each other. The chairman of the Somerset Coal Canal Society met with the Public Rights of Way Officer for Bath and North East Somerset Council in 2019, and the idea of connecting them up, to create a footpath along the whole route of the canal was born. The route was called the Coal Canal Way, and a booklet to describe it was produced. In 2021 a project to waymark the footpaths was begun, so that people without the booklet could follow them, and was completed by early 2022.

The canal society would like to see full restoration to navigable standards of the northern branch from Paulton to Dundas. They submitted their plans to the Waterspace Partnership, a joint initiative between the Environment Agency, Bath & North East Somerset Council, the Canal & River Trust and Wessex Water, which is seeking to revitalise the canals and rivers of Bath and north-east Somerset. The canal restoration was included in the Waterspace study document as one that the partnership could actively support. The concept was to restore the route to Paulton, in a way that was sensitive to its history and environmental benefits. There was no intention to restore the Radstock branch, although that route could be enhanced as a heritage trail. The report recognised the difficulties of restoring a route that is currently owned by around 80 different landowners, but noted that it could be restored in sections, as many other canals have been. It was suggested that the restoration of 820 yards (750 m) from the A36 bridge to Mill would be a good place to start, as that would join onto the existing watered section at Brassknocker Basin. Most of that section is owned by Monkton Combe School. The study also noted the likely economic benefits that canal restoration could bring to the area.

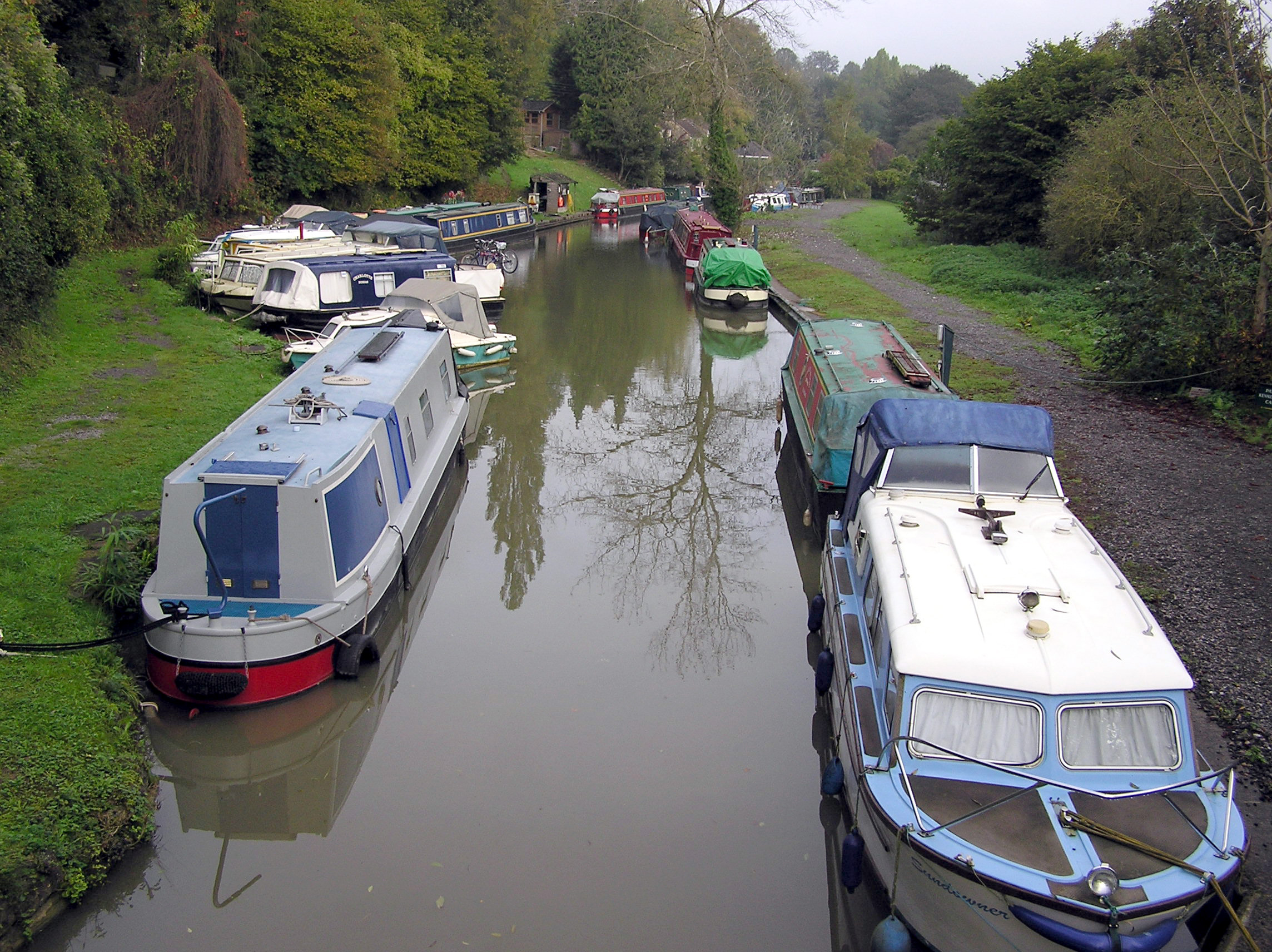
Brassknocker Basin in 2006. This is the only navigable section of the canal, near its junction with the Kennet and Avon Canal. There are moorings, a café, and boat and cycle hire.

The canal society have produced a restoration plan that looks at the benefits that a restored canal might bring, and some of the difficulties that would be encountered in achieving this. Timsbury and Paulton Basins are both in water, but provide habitat for wildlife, and are unlikely to be restored for boating. Near Radford, a scrapyard and private gardens occupy the route, there is no alternative route possible without passing through private land and creating an entirely new canal route. At Camerton, the access road to an estate called Canal View has been built along the canal, after which a house blocks the way forwards. At Combe Hay, many of the locks are in reasonable condition, although some repairs to frost damage of the stonework will be necessary. The locks are numbered from the top downwards, and the pound between locks 5 and 6 has been filled with water as a garden feature. The walls of lock 11 have collapsed, and lock 16 was buried beneath the railway embankment. Locks 17 to 22 have been infilled to varying extents. Below lock 19, the branch of the canal that enabled boats to reach the inclined plane is still visible. At Upper Midford the canal is blocked entirely at the accommodation bridge by the 40-foot (12 m) high embankment of the railway that crosses it. At Monkton Combe, another house occupies the route, and some of it has been buried beneath sports pitches. The final obstacle is the A36 bridge, beyond which is the restored Brassknocker Basin.

Most of the canal features along the entire route are on private land but the towpath survives in places as a right of way. The later railway from Midford to Wellow on the southern branch has been surfaced to form part of National Cycle Route 24. The area around Timsbury and Paulton Basins has been designated as an 'area of special architectural or historic interest, the character or appearance of which it is desirable to preserve or enhance' under section 69 of the Planning (Listed Buildings and Conservation Areas) Act 1990.

== Restoration works ==
The 0.25-mile (0.40 km) stretch at Brassknocker Basin where the canal joins the Kennet and Avon at Dundas Aqueduct was restored during the 1980s and is now a thriving marina with moorings. Excavations of the old stop lock (at the junction with the Kennet and Avon Canal) showed that this had originally been a broad (14 feet, 4.3 m) lock that at some point around 1820 was narrowed to 7 feet (2.1 m) by moving the lock wall.

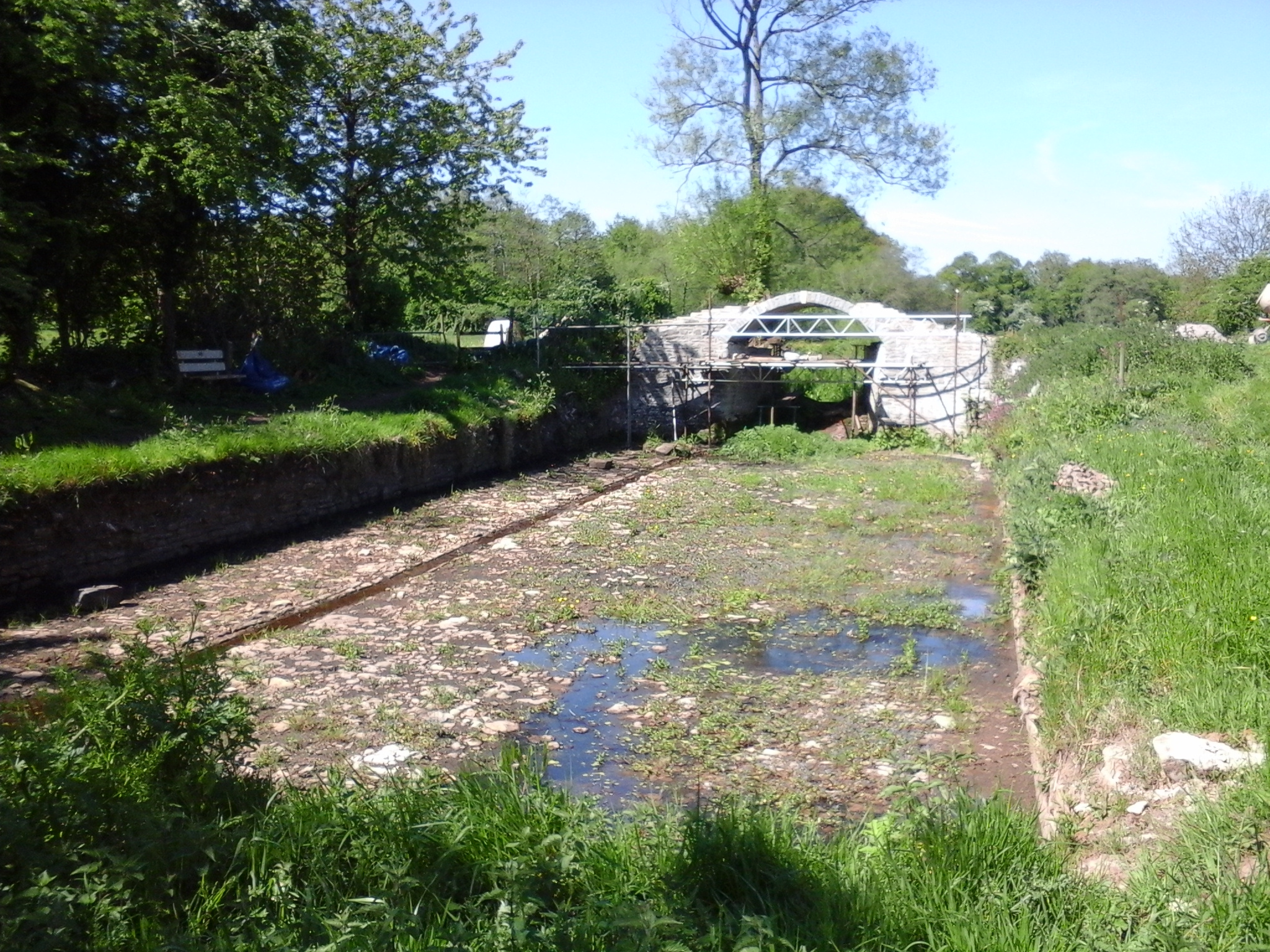
The excavated canal dry dock and restored entrance arch at Paulton Basin in 2015

Work started in 2013 to reveal and excavate the drydock next to the eastern Paulton Basin, with an offer of help from Richard Fox, one of the landowners, and his mini-digger. Most of the northern wall was revealed, together with the sluice, a partly-demolished drainage culvert, and part of the southern wall. This enabled the size of the drydock to be estimated. Consultation with other landowners resulted in a decision to leave the whole dock open, so that its historic value can be appreciated. Work then started on rebuilding the culvert, to keep the site dry. The drydock is larger than most on the canal system in England, being about 30 feet (9.1 m) wide and 83 feet (25 m) long, large enough for three full-length narrowboats to be worked on at the same time.

The rebuilding of the drainage culvert at the southeast corner of the drydock was completed in December 2013 by members of the Waterway Recovery Group, and remedial work around the culvert was undertaken by workers from Radford Farm. The drydock itself was completely excavated in April 2014. At the western end, the entrance to the drydock was crossed by a bridge, partially demolished in 2002 but rebuilt during 2014 and 2015.

The section between Paulton and Radford was excavated in 2014, and in mid-2015 was re-watered. It was still in water in early 2016, but subsequently dried out, due to a leak which was found to be at the site of a historic breach of the canal. In mid-2024, the Society were hopeful that the section would be re-watered in 2024-25.

Excavations began in May 2014 at Terminus Bridge, where the abutments were found to be in poor condition. An earth bund between the abutments carried the public footpath and stopped the water draining from Paulton and Timsbury Basins. A new earth bund was installed about 25 m (27 yd) west of Terminus Bridge to stop the water and allow work to continue on the bridge.

=== Grant to study history of the canal ===
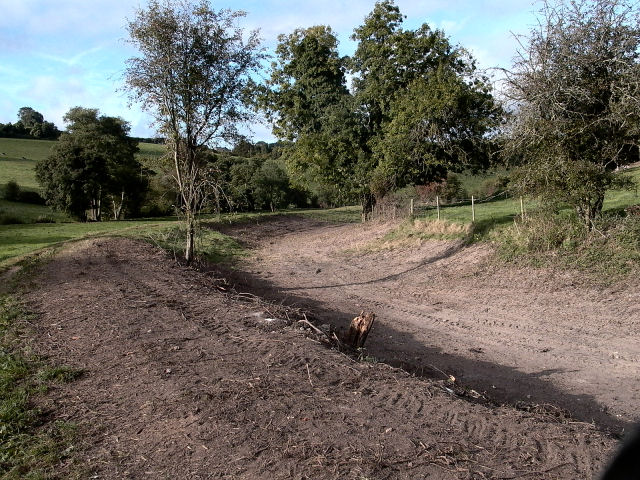
The restored canal bed at Upper Midford in 2009, to the west of a recently uncovered Georgian spillway drain

The canal has been studied for many years with exploration and restoration work being undertaken in Wellow and elsewhere. Particular effort, so far unsuccessful, has been put into trying to find the site of the second and third caisson locks at Combe Hay. In October 2006 a grant of £20,000 was obtained from the Heritage Lottery Fund, by the Somersetshire Coal Canal Society in association with Bath & North East Somerset Council and the Avon Industrial Buildings Trust to carry out a technical study on one of the locks and associated structures at Combe Hay. Many of the locks and associated workings are listed buildings, including the upper ten of the Combe Hay locks which are in Combe Hay parish, the lower five locks which are in the parish of South Stoke, the basin at the bottom of the inclined plane, Dunkerton aqueduct, a bridge over the canal near Caisson House, another bridge at South Stoke, Midford Aqueduct, the entrance lock from the Kennet and Avon Canal, and the crane at Dundas Wharf.

== Route and points of interest ==
Point	Coordinates (Links to map resources)	OS Grid Ref	Notes
Site of Paulton basin	51.304°N 2.494°W	ST655563	Paulton
Site of Dunkerton aqueduct	51.334°N 2.409°W	ST715595	Dunkerton
Site of caisson lock	51.337°N 2.383°W	ST733598	Combe Hay
Junction of branches and tramway connection	51.343°N 2.343°W	ST761605	Midford
Junction with Kennet and Avon Canal	51.361°N 2.312°W	ST783625	Limpley Stoke

== See also ==
- Canals of Great Britain
- History of the British canal system

== Bibliography ==
- Allsop, Niall (1993). The Somersetshire Coal Canal Rediscovered: A Walker's Guide. Bath: Millstream Books. ISBN 978-0-948975-35-6.
- Brown, Jan (11 October 2022). "The Somersetshire Coal Canal September 2022". Bugsworth Basin Heritage Trust.
- Castens, Simon (2002). On the Trail of The Titfield Thunderbolt. Thunderbolt Books. ISBN 978-0-9538771-0-2.
- Chapman, Mike (1987). "The Somerset Coal Canal - a Cartographical Survey" (PDF). Bias Journal No 20. Bristol Industrial Archaeological Society.
- Chapman, Mike (1997). "A Trial Excavation of the Suspected Site of the Caisson Lock, Combe Hay, 1997" (PDF). Bias Journal No 30. Bristol Industrial Archaeological Society.
- Chapman, Mike (2000). The Timsbury Book – Timsbury & the Somersetshire coal canal. Timsbury: Timsbury Parish Council Millennium Committee. ISBN 978-0-9526225-5-0.
- Clew, Kenneth R (1970). The Somersetshire Coal Canal and Railways. Newton Abbot: David & Charles. ISBN 978-0-7153-4792-8.
- Cornwell, John (2005). Collieries of Somerset and Bristol. Landmark Publishing. ISBN 978-1-84306-170-0.
- Cumberlidge, Jane (2009). Inland Waterways of Great Britain (8th Ed.). Imray Laurie Norie and Wilson. ISBN 978-1-84623-010-3.
- Dalby, L. J. (2000). The Wilts and Berks Canal. Oakwood Press. ISBN 978-0-85361-562-0.
- Down, C.G.; Warrington, A. J. (2005). The history of the Somerset coalfield. Radstock: Radstock Museum. ISBN 978-0-9551684-0-6.
- Hadfield, Charles (1969). The Canals of South and South-East England. David and Charles. ISBN 978-0-7153-4693-8.
- Halse, Roger; Castens, Simon (2000). The Somersetshire Coal Canal: A Pictorial Journey. Bath: Millstream Books. ISBN 978-0-948975-58-5.
- Handley, Chris (2006). Transport & Industrial Development in the Somerset Coalfield. Radstock: Radstock, Midsomer Norton and District Museum Society.
- Handley, Chris; Halse, Roger (2001). The Radstock Branch of the Somersetshire Coal Canal. Radstock, Midsomer Norton and District Museum Society.
- Mitchell, Vic; Smith, Keith (June 1996). Frome to Bristol including the Camerton Branch and the "Titfield Thunderbolt". Middleton Press. ISBN 978-1-873793-77-0.
- Paget-Tomlinson, Edward (2006). The illustrated history of canal and river navigations. Landmark Publishing. ISBN 978-1-84306-207-3.
- Priestley, Joseph (1831). "Historical Account of the Navigable Rivers, Canals and Railways of Great Britain". Archived from the original on 4 March 2016.
- Restoration Plan (June 2024). "Restoration Plan - Baseline Assessment Version 1.5" (PDF). Somersetshire Coal Canal Society. Archived (PDF) from the original on 23 April 2025.
- Russell, Ronald (1971). Lost Canals of England and Wales. David & Charles. ISBN 978-0-7173-5417-7.
- Squires, Roger (2008). Britain's restored canals. Landmark Publishing. ISBN 978-1-84306-331-5.
- Torrens, Hugh (1975). "The Somersetshire Coal Canal Caisson Lock" (PDF). Bristol Industrial Archaeological Society Journal (8).
- Waterspace (November 2022). "Projects and Project Ideas" (PDF). Bath & NE Somerset Council. Archived (PDF) from the original on 14 April 2025.
- Winchester, Simon (2001). The Map That Changed the World. London: Penguin Books. ISBN 978-0-14-028039-5.
