= Dundas Aqueduct =

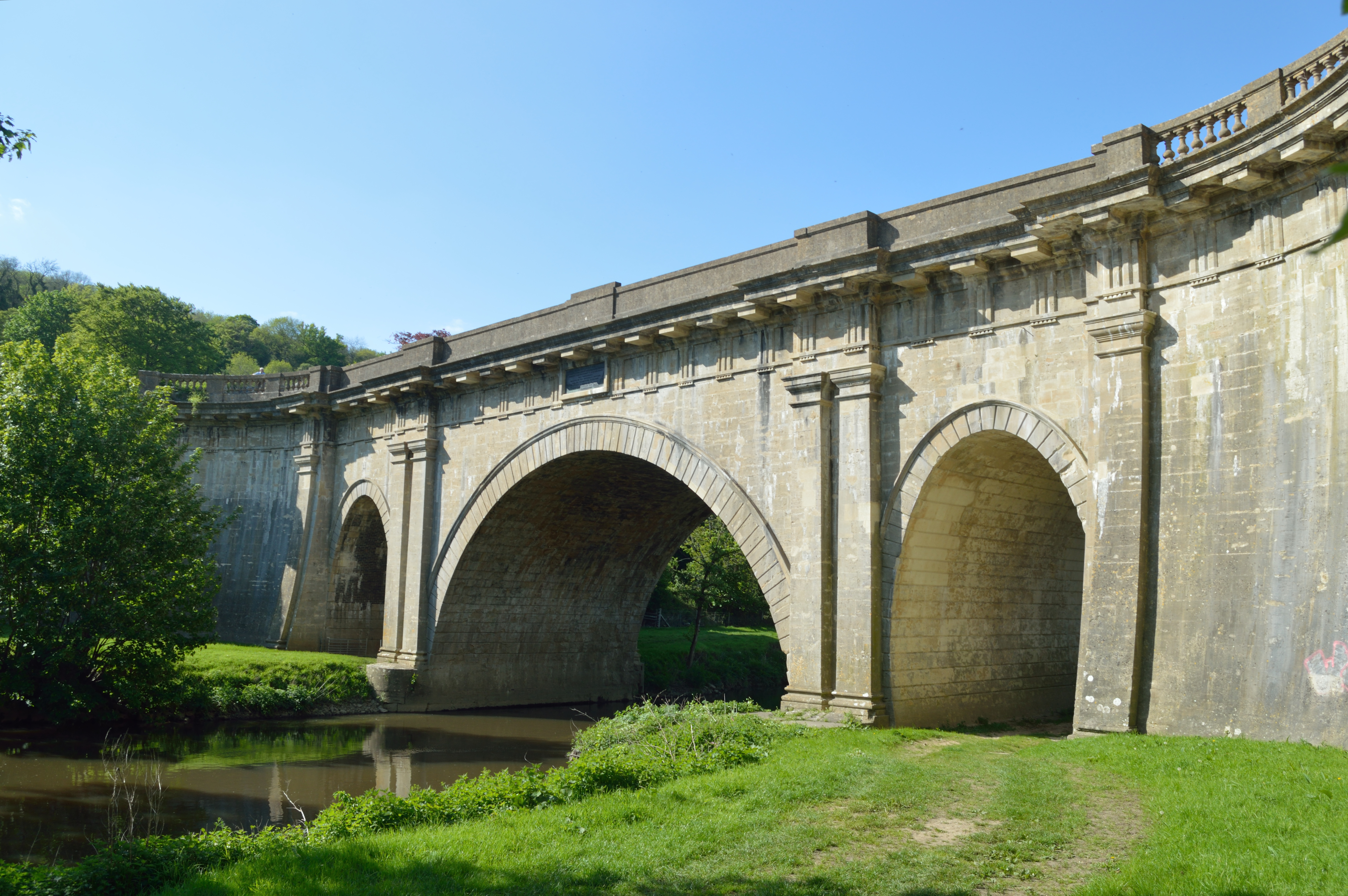
- Coordinates: 51.3616°N 2.3105°W
- OS grid reference: ST784625
- Carries: Kennet and Avon Canal
- Crosses: River Avon, Wessex Main Line
- Locale: Limpley Stoke
- Maintained by: Canal & River Trust
- Heritage status: Grade I

Characteristics
- Pier construction: Bath Stone
- Total length: 150 feet (45.7 m)
- Longest span: 65 feet (19.8 m)

History
- Designer: John Rennie
- Construction start: 1797
- Construction end: 1801
- Opened: 1805
- Rebuilt: 1984

Location
- Interactive map of Dundas Aqueduct

Dundas Aqueduct (grid reference ST785625) is an aqueduct in England which carries the Kennet and Avon Canal over the River Avon (the Somerset / Wiltshire border) and the Wessex Main Line railway. The aqueduct is near Monkton Combe, Somerset, and is about 2 1/2 miles (4 km) south-east of the city of Bath.

It was designed by John Rennie and chief engineer John Thomas between 1797 and 1801, and completed in 1805. James McIlquham was appointed contractor. It is named after Charles Dundas, the first chairman of the Kennet and Avon Canal Company. The aqueduct is 150 feet (45.7 m) long with three arches built of Bath stone, with Doric pilasters, and balustrades at each end. The central semicircular arch spans 64 feet (19.5 m), and the two oval side arches span 20 feet (6.1 m).

The canal crosses back across the Avon and the railway on another aqueduct at Avoncliff. This diversion onto the right bank of the Avon avoids the steep sides of the river valley at Limpley Stoke, and the need to cross the Midford Brook and River Frome.

The aqueduct is a Grade I listed structure, and was the first canal structure to be designated as a scheduled monument in 1951.

Over many years, leaks had developed and the aqueduct was closed in 1954. For a while in the 1960s and 1970s, the canal was dry and it was possible to walk along the bed on each side of the river, as well as through the aqueduct itself. The aqueduct was relined with polythene and concrete and restored, reopening in 1984. Care was taken not to disturb a colony of bats living under the aqueduct.

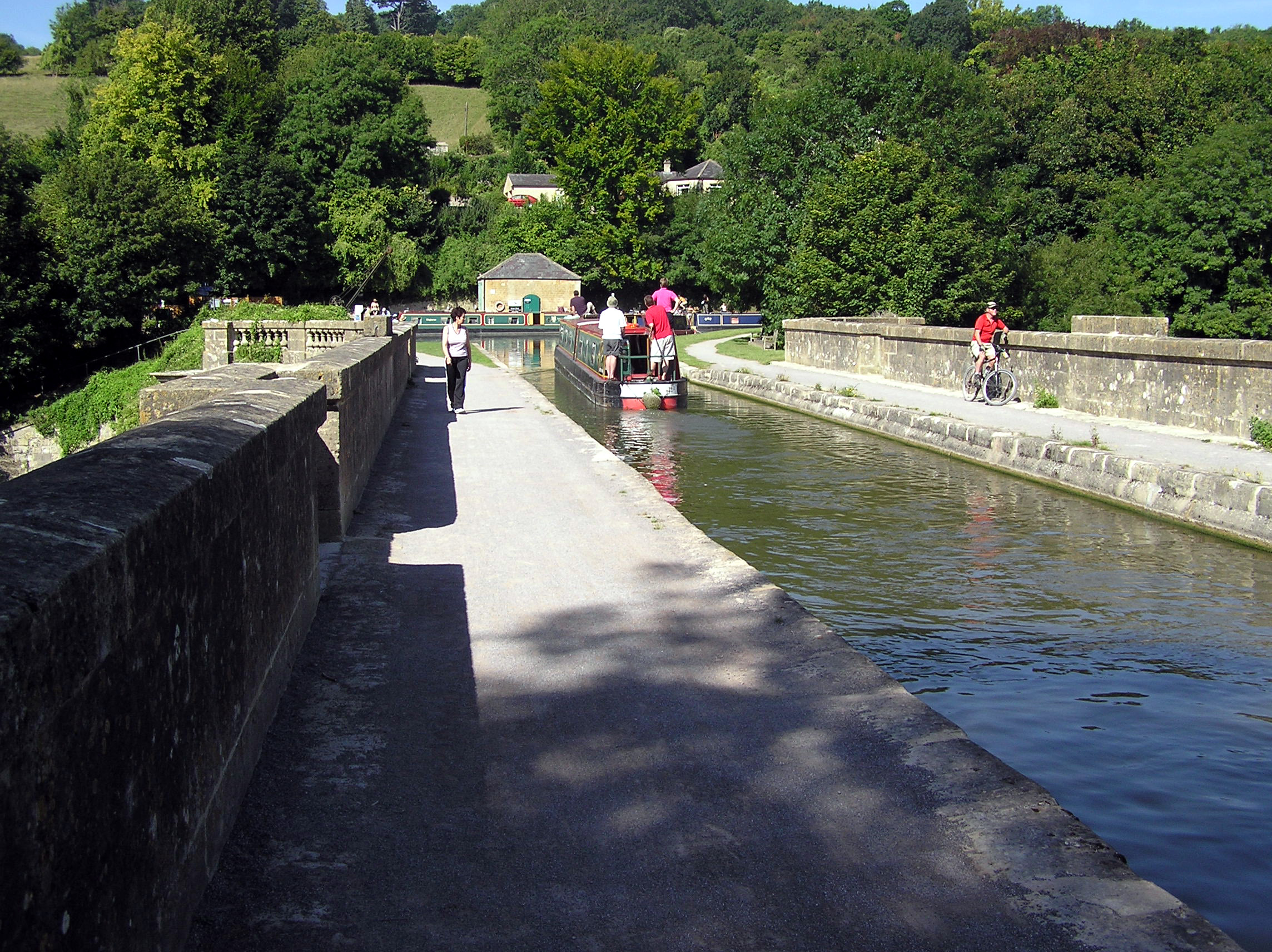
The Dundas aqueduct from the eastern end. The canal boat in the picture can turn left to moorings on the only remaining section of the Somerset Coal Canal, or right to traverse the last few miles of the canal into the city of Bath. The walls of the aqueduct can be seen on the left and right; the river and railway are unseen, far below.

The aqueduct is also the junction between the Kennet and Avon Canal and the largely derelict Somerset Coal Canal. The short stretch of the Somerset Coal Canal still in water forms Brassknocker Basin, used for boat moorings, cycle hire and a cafe, and is next to Dundas Wharf where the small tollhouse, warehouse and crane still stand. The stretch of river below and above the aqueduct has been used by Monkton Combe School Boat Club (Monkton Bluefriars) up to six days a week, since at least the 1960s. At the opposite (Wiltshire) end of the aqueduct a wharf was constructed serving the Conkwell stone quarries.

Between 2002 and 2004, further restoration was undertaken that included replacing engineering bricks, used by the Great Western Railway to make earlier repairs, with Bath stone to match the original work.

In 2015, the railway below the aqueduct was lowered to allow the line to be used as a diversionary route for freight trains in the future. Network Rail published a time-lapse video of the work.

== See also ==
Media related to Dundas Aqueduct at Wikimedia Commons

- List of canal aqueducts in the United Kingdom
