= Cleaves Wood =

Protected area in Somerset, England

- Site of Special Scientific Interest
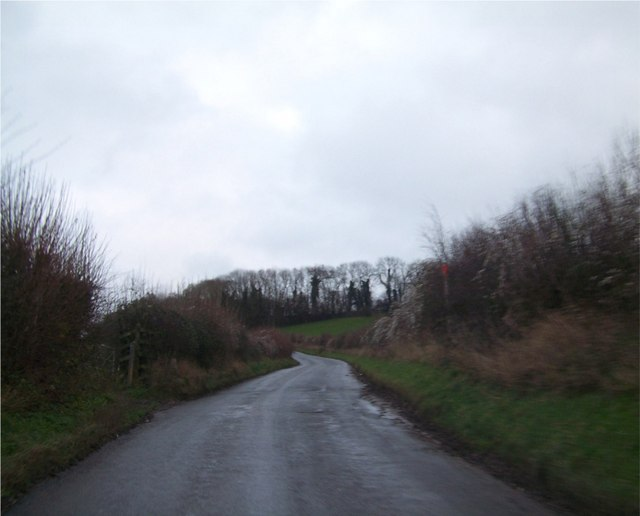

- Location within Somerset
- Location of Cleaves Wood.
- Area of search: Avon
- Grid reference: ST758576
- Coordinates: 51.31699°N 2.34863°W
- Interest: Biological
- Area: 99.77 acres (0.4038 km^{2}; 0.15589 sq mi)
- Notification date: 1988

Cleaves Wood (grid reference ST758576) is a 40.38 hectare biological Site of Special Scientific Interest (SSSI) near the village of Wellow in Bath and North East Somerset, notified in 1988.

Cleaves Wood is an ancient, semi-natural deciduous woodland on oolitic limestone. It has a high diversity of tree and shrub species and a large population of the nationally scarce plant spiked star-of-Bethlehem (Ornithogalum pyrenaicum). There are also areas of grassland which is lightly grazed by rabbits and is a mosaic of close grazed and rough swards, and wetter areas.

The scarce plants found here include the fly orchid and wild daffodil.

The habitat diversity of the site has resulted in a rich invertebrate fauna, including two nationally rare insects: the beetle Osphya bipunctata and the hoverfly Cheilosia nigripes. Twenty-seven butterflies have been recorded from the site including the nationally scarce species, Duke of Burgundy (Hamearis lucina). The nationally scarce moth, Blomer's rivulet (Discoloxia blomeri) has also been recorded on the site. Other nationally scarce species include the snail Ena montana, the hoverfly Xanthogramma citrofasciatum, and a number of beetle species.
