= Peasedown St John =

Village in Somerset, England

Coordinates: 51.315°N 2.424°W

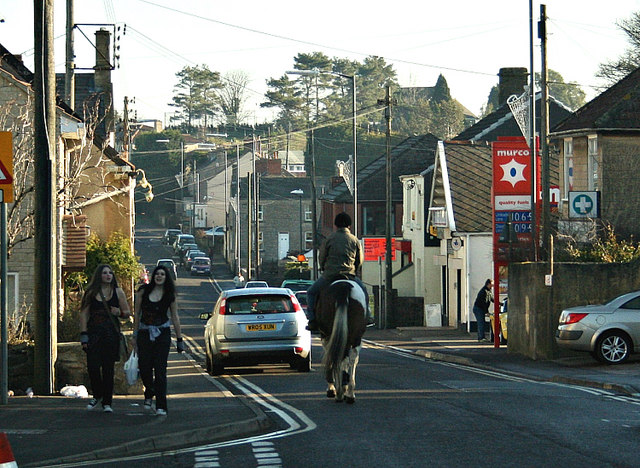
- The main street

- Location within Somerset
- Population: 6,446 (2011)
- OS grid reference: ST705574
- Unitary authority: Bath and North East Somerset
- Ceremonial county: Somerset
- Region: South West
- Country: England
- Sovereign state: United Kingdom
- Post town: Bath
- Postcode district: BA2
- Dialling code: 01761
- Police: Avon and Somerset
- Fire: Avon
- Ambulance: South Western
- UK Parliament: Frome and East Somerset

Peasedown St John (commonly referred to as Peasedown) is a large village and civil parish in Somerset, England, standing on a hilltop roughly 5 miles (8 km) south-southwest of the city of Bath, and 2 miles (3 km) north-east of the town of Radstock at the foot of the Mendip Hills. Peasedown used to be a coal mining village, and after the last of the mines shut in the 1970s it became a dormitory village for Bath, Trowbridge and to a lesser extent Bristol. Its size was increased by substantial housing developments in the 1960s, 1970s and late 1990s, making it one of the largest villages in Somerset.

== History ==
Archaeological and documentary evidence shows that the site has been occupied from at least the early Iron Age. There is good evidence of Roman and Saxon villages in the area, the Saxon settlements resulting in several entries in the Domesday Book of 1086. The medieval settlement of Eckweek was excavated in 1989, and now lies under the Peasedown Bypass and Underknoll Road.

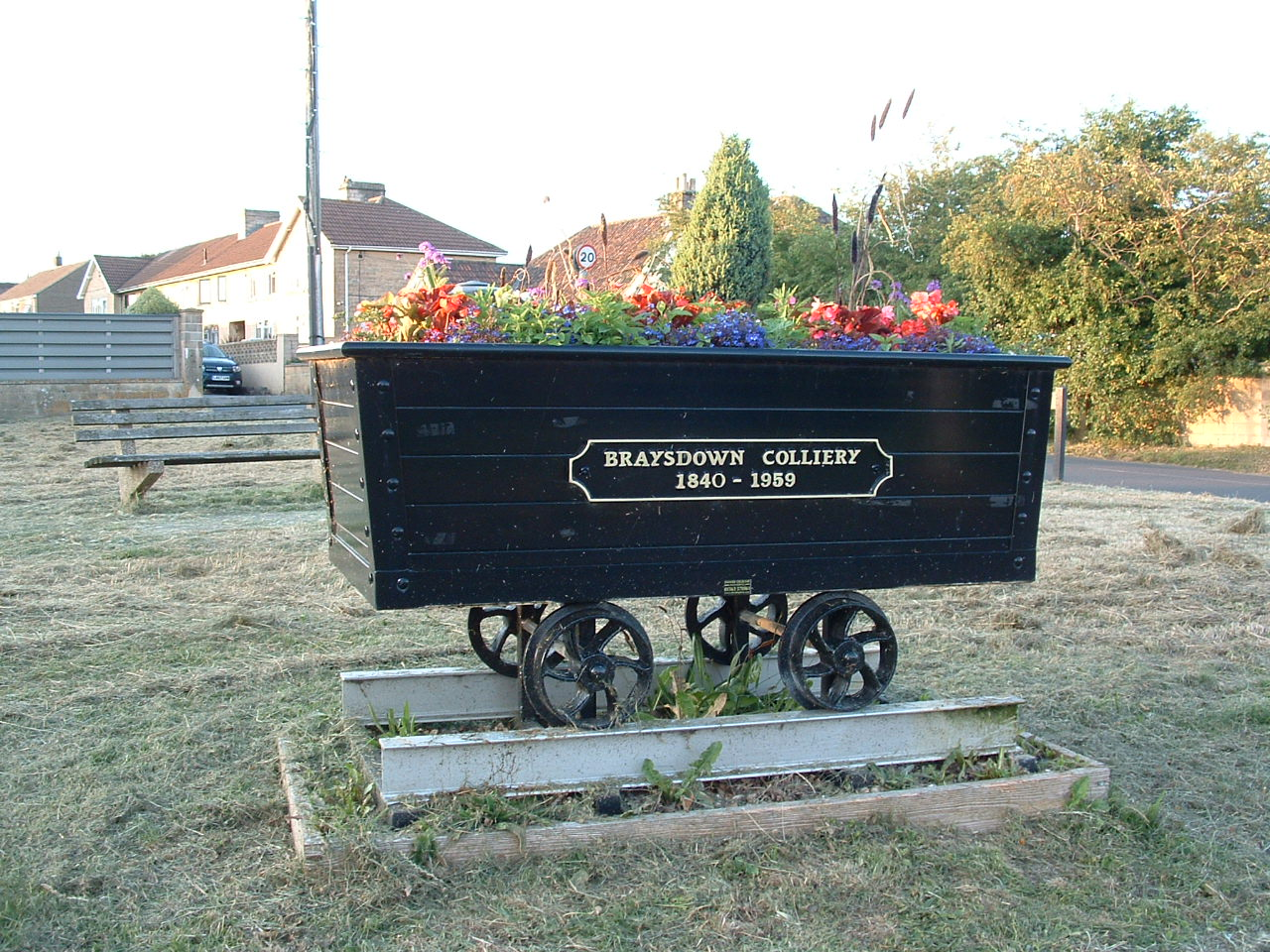
A memorial to Braysdown Colliery.

The present village of Peasedown St John is relatively modern. 'A place known by the name of The Red Post' was how the scattering of buildings was referred to in 1768, taking its name from the local Public House. The hamlet of Carlingcott on the north-west edge of Peasedown is known to have existed before 1800 but the main modern development in the area began in the 19th century when the Somerset Coalfield was greatly expanded as the Industrial Revolution increased demand for coal across England. By the early 1840s there was still no discernible village, except a few cottages around the Red Post and a small number of buildings along what would become the Bath Road, near a field named "Pease Down" (now Highfield Road). The 1841 census lists about fifteen households with around eighty people living at "Peas Down", mostly coal miners, with some agricultural labourers, two carpenters, a seamstress, and a stonemason. The sinking of the Braysdown colliery in 1845 meant that accommodation had to be built for the enlarged workforce to work the new pit and expansion of the village was now inevitable.

By the second half of the 20th century there were at least six collieries within 3 km (1.9 mi) of Peasedown, including Braysdown, Camerton, Dunkerton, Writhlington and Shoscombe.

The rapid growth of non-conformist religion across the North-Somerset Coalfield in the later 1800s and early 1900s was evident in Peasedown St John. There was a Primitive Methodist Chapel on the Bath Road (now Peasedown Methodist Church), Wesleyan Chapels in Braysdown Lane, New Buildings and Carlingcott, a United Methodist Chapel in Carlingcott (which closed in 2011), a Baptist Chapel on Eckweek Road (now Zebedees Nursery School) and a Christadelphian Hall which still stands on Huddox Hill.

With the closure of the coal mines in the period up to the 1970s, and the growing popularity of out-of-town living, Peasedown rapidly became a commuter village for the cities of Bath and Bristol. This increased with two further phases of construction, the first in the 1950s and 1960s and the second in the late 1990s and early 2000s. Both involved the construction of what were intended as affordable family housing, the first phase being mainly in the southeast of the village and consisting mostly of terraced or semi-detached properties.

== Governance ==
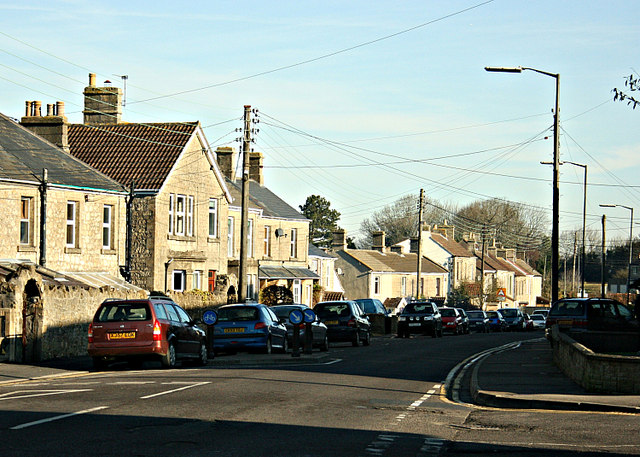
Houses on Bath Road, Peasedown's main street

Although it was between 1850 and 1890 that Peasedown grew into being a distinct settlement, it was not until 1955 that it became a civil parish, having been divided for administrative purposes between Camerton, Wellow and Dunkerton until that point.

The parish council, which has 17 members, is responsible for local issues and liasing between the community and higher authorities.

The parish falls within the area of the unitary authority of Bath and North East Somerset, and within the ceremonial county of Somerset. Peasedown ward elects two members of Bath and North East Somerset Council. Between 1 April 1974 and 1 April 1996, the parish was in the Wansdyke district of the county of Avon. Before 1974, the parish was part of the Bathavon Rural District.

The parish is represented in the House of Commons of the Parliament of the United Kingdom as part of the Frome and East Somerset constituency.

== Geography ==
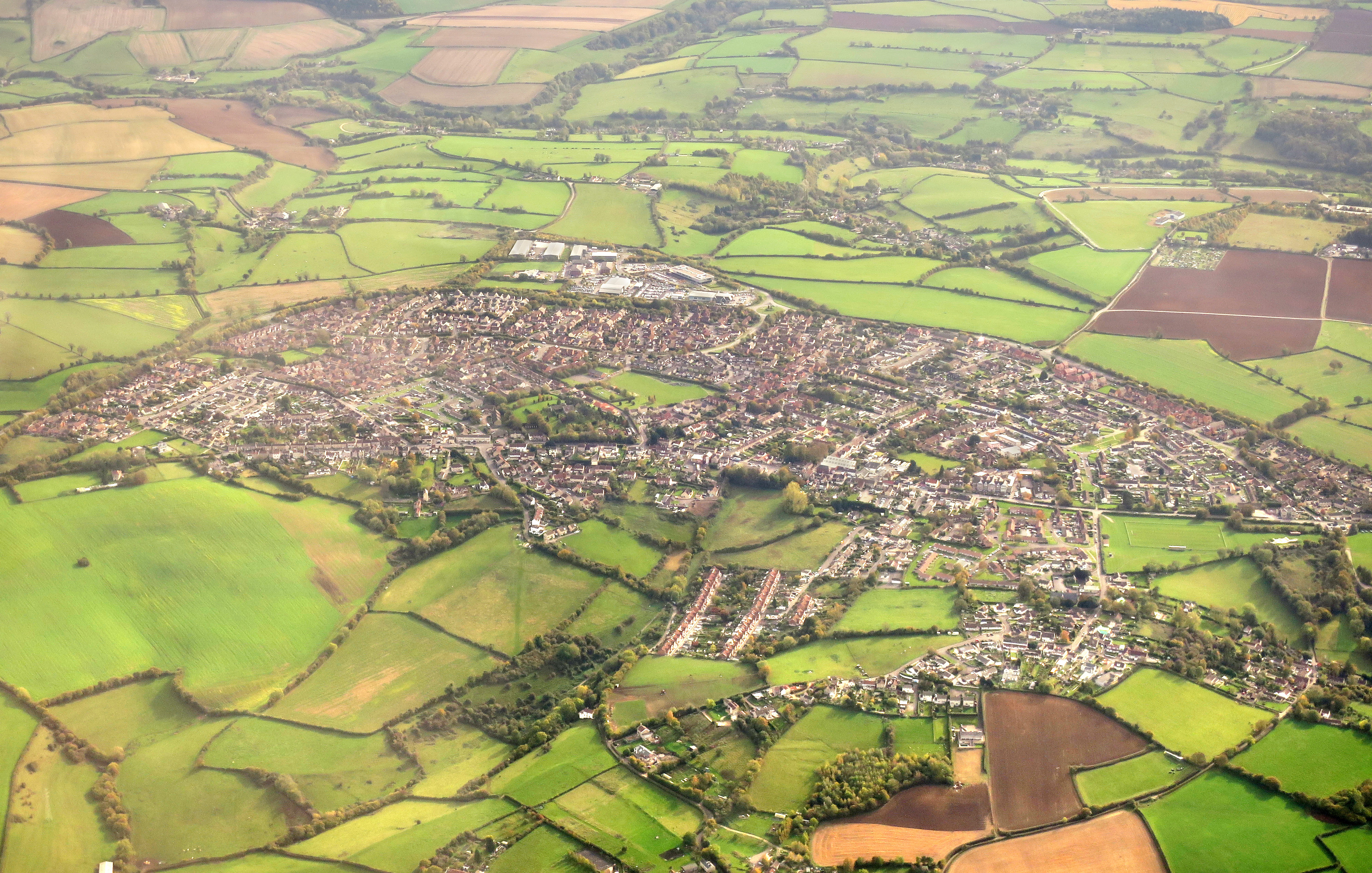
Aerial view

Peasedown lies on one of the many hills outside Bath, roughly 7 km (4.3 mi) south-southwest of Bath and 20 km (12 mi) southeast of Bristol. Much the village lies on the relatively flat section on the top of the hill, but the northwestern side of the village is on the slope of the hill.

The village of Wellow, 3 miles (4 km) to the east of Peasedown, marks the southern edge of the Cotswolds Area of Outstanding Natural Beauty.

=== Climate ===
Along with the rest of South West England, Peasedown St John has a temperate climate which is generally wetter and milder than the rest of the country. The annual mean temperature is approximately 10 °C (50.0 °F). Seasonal temperature variation is less extreme than most of the United Kingdom because of the adjacent sea temperatures. The summer months of July and August are the warmest with mean daily maxima of approximately 21 °C (69.8 °F). In winter mean minimum temperatures of 1 °C (33.8 °F) or 2 °C (35.6 °F) are common. In the summer the Azores high pressure affects the south-west of England, however convective cloud sometimes forms inland, reducing the number of hours of sunshine. Annual sunshine rates are slightly less than the regional average of 1,600 hours. In December 1998 there were 20 days without sun recorded at Yeovilton. Most of the rainfall in the south-west is caused by Atlantic depressions or by convection. Most of the rainfall in autumn and winter is caused by the Atlantic depressions, which is when they are most active. In summer, a large proportion of the rainfall is caused by sun heating the ground leading to convection and to showers and thunderstorms. Average rainfall is around 700 mm (28 in). About 8–15 days of snowfall is typical. November to March have the highest mean wind speeds, and June to August have the lightest winds. The predominant wind direction is from the south-west.

== Demography ==
At the 2021 census, the population of Peasedown Ward was 6,668 and the average (mean) age was approximately 41. There were 1,386.8 residents per square kilometre.

== Amenities ==
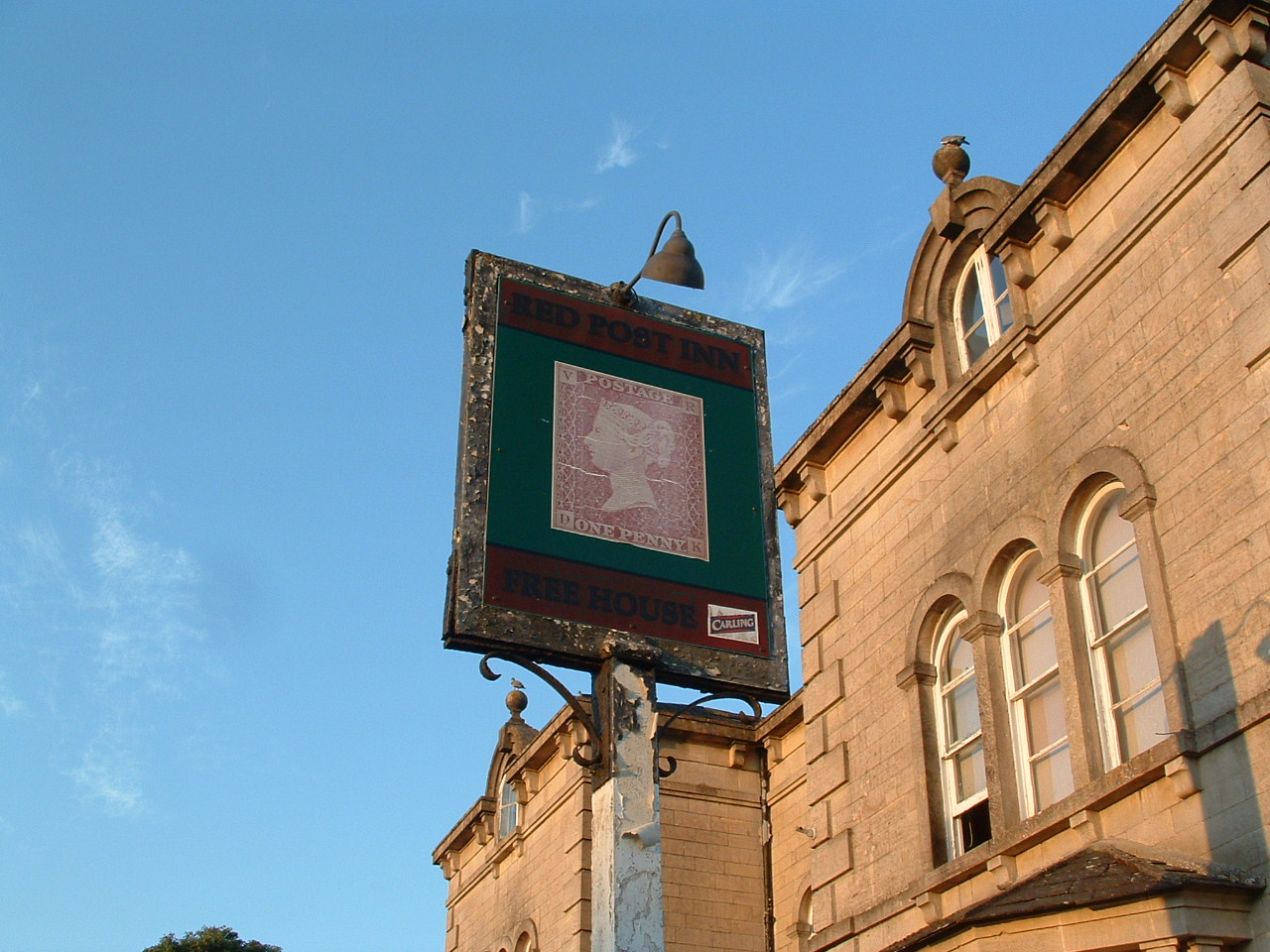
Red Post Inn

Amenities include a doctors' surgery, a dental practice, a veterinary practice, two public houses (The Waggon & Horses and The Red Post, built in 1851), a community centre, cricket and football clubs, a cattery and a range of shops.

Sulis Hospital, just off the bypass and to the south, was designed by Foster and Partners and opened in 2010 as a private hospital called Circle Bath. Since 2021 it has been a subsidiary of Bath's Royal United Hospital, providing both private and NHS treatment.

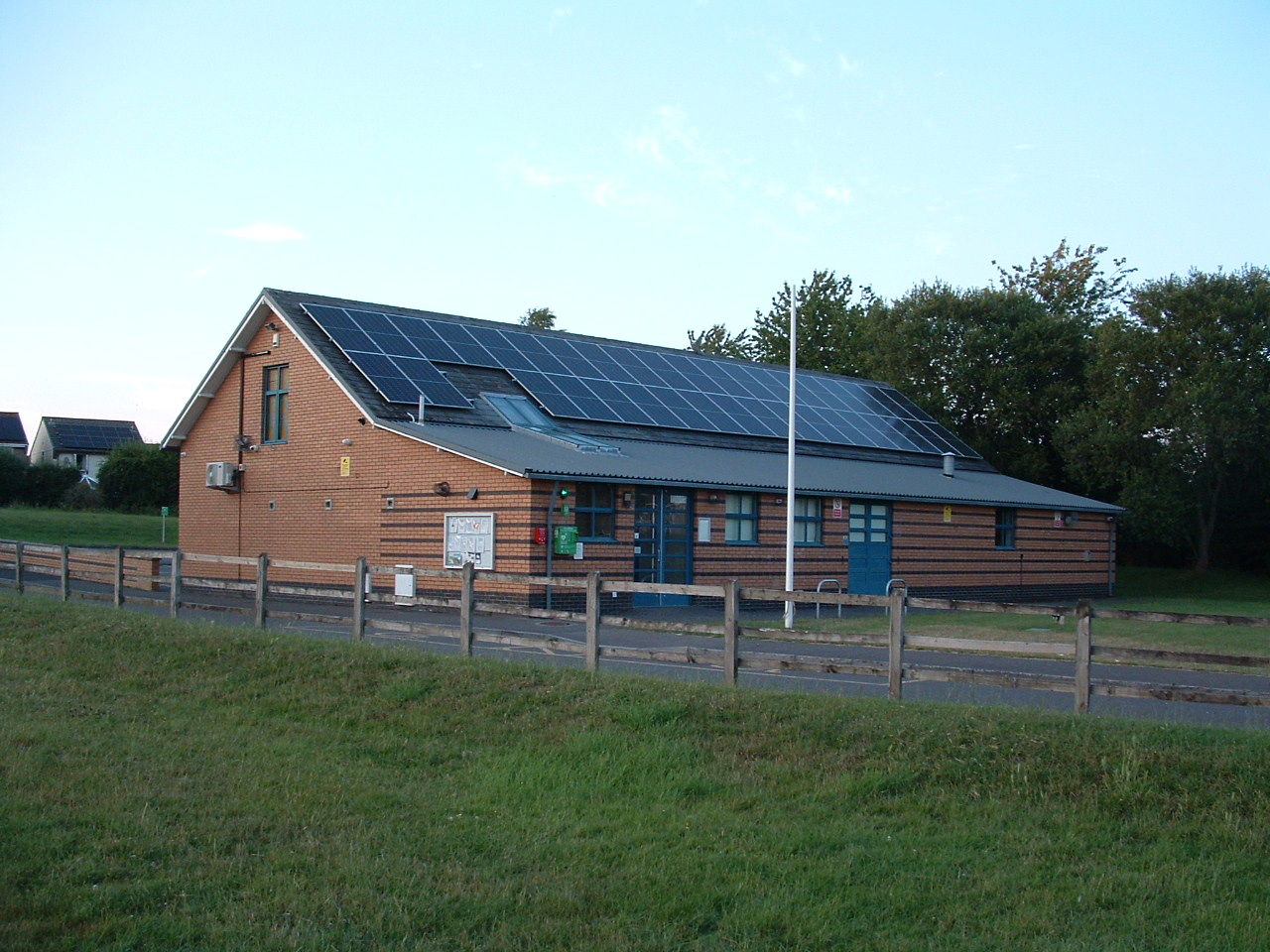
Beacon Hall, the village hall.

There are children's play areas at Beacon Field, Eckweek Lane and on 'the Rec' (Peasedown Recreation Field), with the latter including a skate park. There is a further public open space at Ecewiche Green. Beacon Hall is the home of the Peasedown St John Community Association.

== Organisations and clubs ==
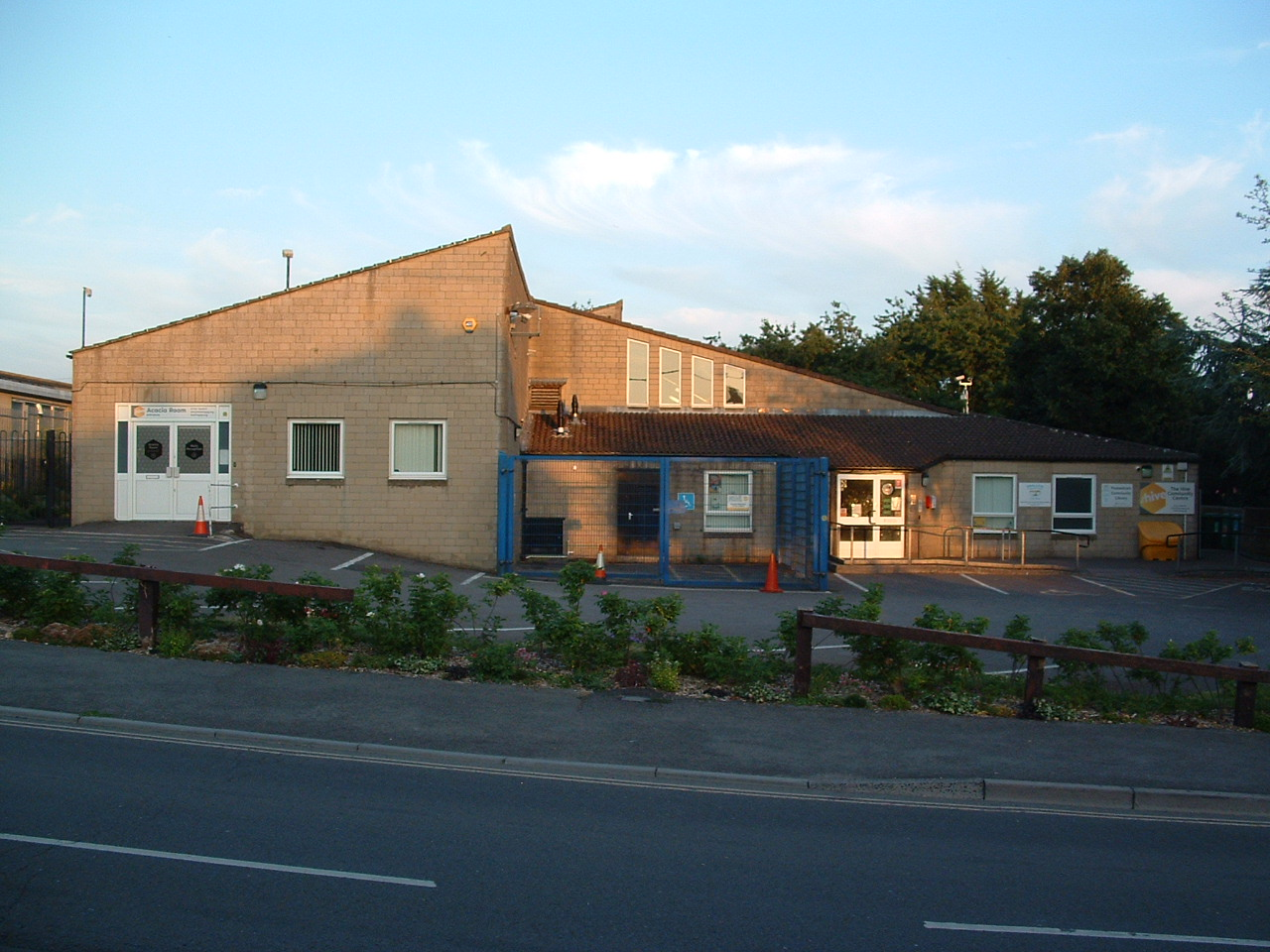
The Hive, a local community centre.

Peasedown Athletic Football Club began life in the late 1800s as Peasedown Miners Welfare; the club continues to field a senior team in the Somerset County League and a Reserve side in the Midsomerset Football League. Peasedown Albion Football Club runs junior sides for 150 children and teenagers. Peasedown St John Cricket Club was founded over 100 years ago. Today it runs several adult teams and three youth teams. Adjacent to the ground is the clubhouse which is also used to hold a variety of social functions. Camerton and Peasedown Crouquet Club opened in spring 2012.

There are active Guide and Scout groups in the village.

Peasedown Environment Group is a community-run group advocating for local wildlife and conservation, as well as other environment-focussed projects in the area.

== Transport ==
The A367 (which follows the route of the Roman Fosse Way) between Lincoln and Exeter used to run through Peasedown, but it was bypassed in the mid-1990s. The village is roughly 7 miles (11 km) between the A36 and the A37 to the east and west respectively. First West of England provides Peasedown St. John with bus services to and from Bath, Radstock, Midsomer Norton, Paulton, Shepton Mallet, Bristol and Wells. The village is also home to the coach hire company Arleen.

== Education ==
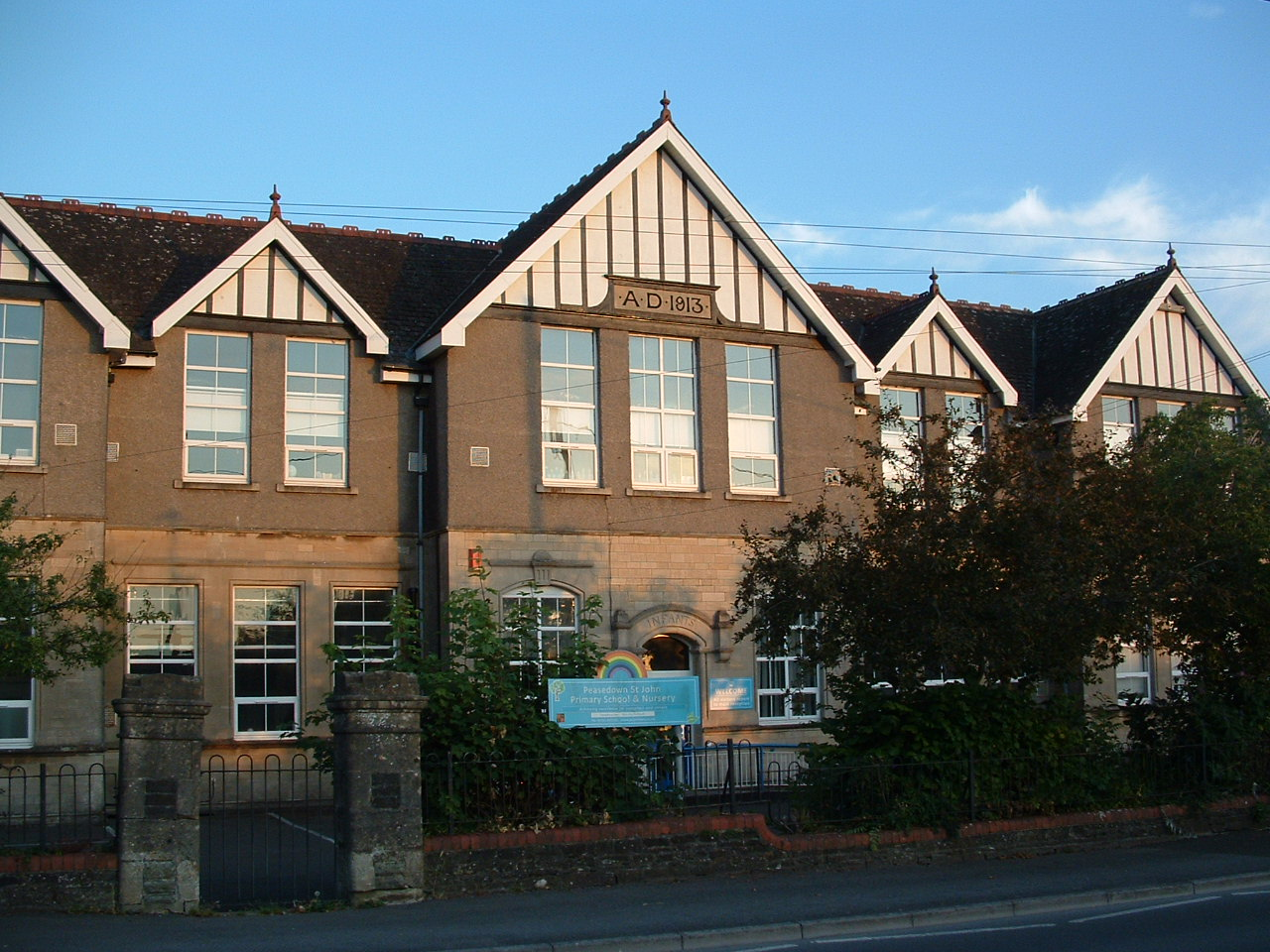
Peasedown St John primary school.

There is a large primary school in Peasedown St John, built in 1913 and extended significantly in recent years. The school was rated "Good" by Ofsted in 2023.

The nearest secondary school is Writhlington School in Writhlington, Radstock, and others are at Midsomer Norton and Bath. Further and higher education locally is provided by the University of Bath, Bath Spa University, the City of Bath College, and Norton Radstock College. Special needs education is provided by Three Ways School.

== Religious communities ==
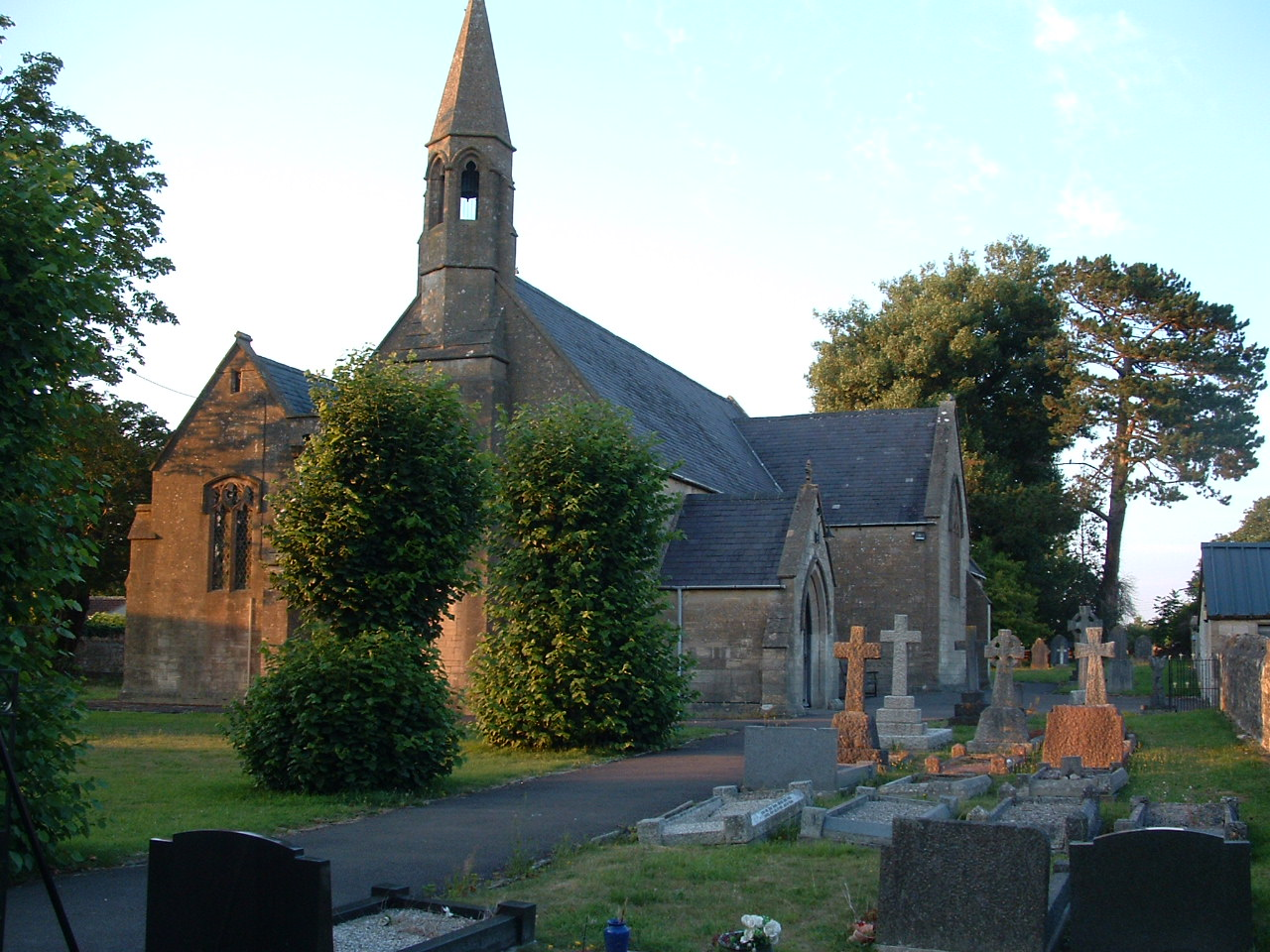
St John's Church

In 2022, 3,151 residents had no religion, and 2,984 were Christian. Peasedown St John has four Christian churches: Church of England, Methodist, Catholic and Christadelphian.

The Parish Church of St John the Baptist was created on 6 August 1874 by Order in Council. Instrumental in its foundation were the Misses Jarrett of Camerton Court, owners of the Camerton Collieries which employed many Peasedown men. As well as providing the land and much of the capital for the construction of the church of St John the Baptist and the adjacent vicarage, they were also responsible for building the first school buildings which stood on Jarrett land in what became Church Road. The current church building dates from 1893, and was designed by George Frederick Bodley and Thomas Garner, replacing an earlier iron structure. The Church is home to a growing congregation, and with an emphasis on Bible teaching and a belief in the work of the Holy Spirit. Today St John's Church forms part of 'the St J's' Benefice, which also includes St Julian's Church in Wellow, St James the Less Church in Foxcote and St Julian's Chapel in Shoscombe.

Peasedown St John Methodist Church was also founded in 1874. The church congregation is active in the community, hosting youth work, lunches for the elderly, drug intervention schemes, and children's clubs.

Peasedown Christadelphian Hall is on Huddox Hill.

== Cultural references ==
Peasedown St John was one of several local villages where, in the 1930s, budding children's author Roald Dahl used to sell kerosene. As he described in his autobiographical work Boy: Tales of Childhood (published 1984):

My kerosene motor-tanker had a tap at the back and when I rolled into Shepton Mallet or Midsomer Norton or Peasedown St John or Huish Champflower, the old girls and the young maidens would hear the roar of my motor and would come out of their cottages with jugs and buckets to buy a gallon of kerosene for their lamps and their heaters. It is fun for a young man to do that sort of thing. Nobody gets a nervous breakdown or a heart attack from selling kerosene to gentle country folk from the back of a tanker in Somerset on a fine summer's day.

== Notable people ==
- Peter Alexander (born 1952), actor who played Phil Pearce in Emmerdale and appeared in EastEnders, Hollyoaks, Brookside and Coronation Street, spent the first seven years of his life in Peasedown.
- Sir Frank Beauchamp (1866–1950), owner of coalmines in the Somerset coalfield, lived in Woodborough House just south of the village.
- Alec Stock (1917–2001), footballer and manager. Played for Tottenham Hotspur, Charlton Athletic, Queens Park Rangers (QPR) and Yeovil Town. Managed Leyton Orient, A.S. Roma, QPR, Luton Town, Fulham and AFC Bournemouth. Also assistant manager of Arsenal and a director of QPR.
- Tony Book (1934-2025), Manchester City footballer, played for Peasedown Miners Welfare FC.
