= Wellow, Somerset =

Village in Somerset, England

Coordinates: 51.3236°N 2.3737°W

Wellow
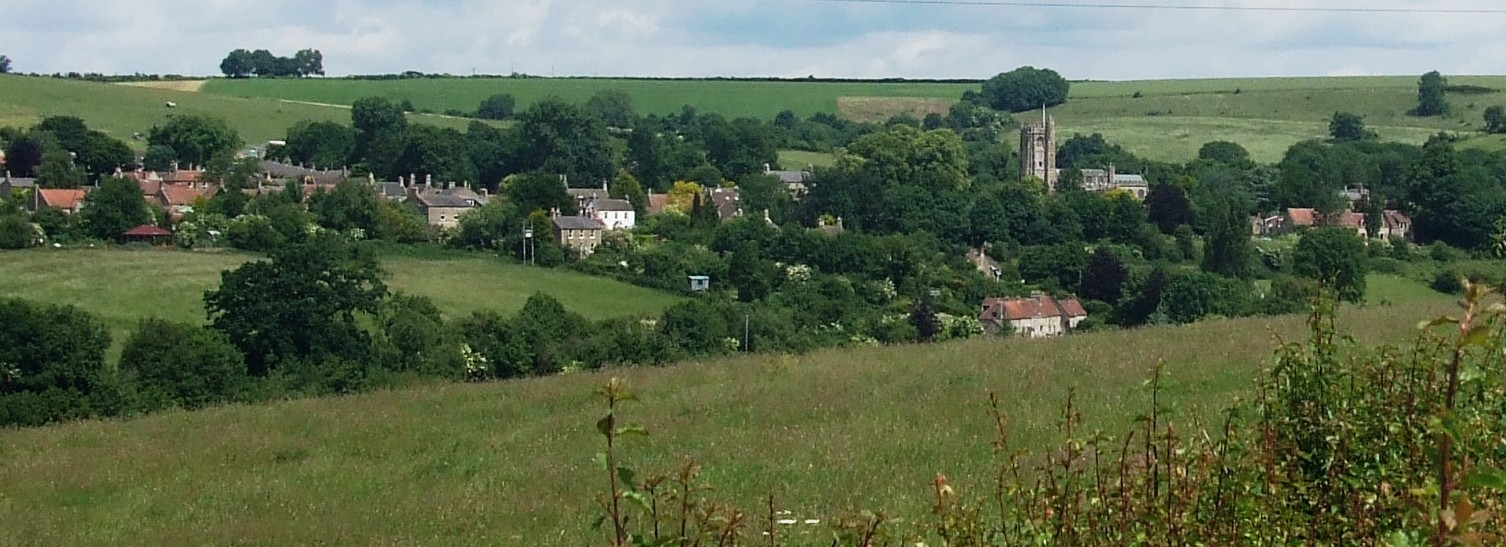
- Wellow village including the church

- Location within Somerset
- Population: 529
- OS grid reference: ST740583
- Unitary authority: Bath and North East Somerset
- Ceremonial county: Somerset
- Region: South West
- Country: England
- Sovereign state: United Kingdom
- Post town: BATH
- Postcode district: BA2
- Police: Avon and Somerset
- Fire: Avon
- Ambulance: South Western
- UK Parliament: Frome and East Somerset

Wellow is a village and civil parish in Somerset, England, about 5 miles (8.0 km) south of Bath. The parish, which includes the hamlets of Twinhoe, White Ox Mead, Baggridge and part of Midford has a population of 529. The village itself falls within the southernmost boundary of the Cotswolds Area of Outstanding Natural Beauty and is recognised as having special architectural and historic interest, which led to it being designated as a Conservation Area in 1983.

== History ==
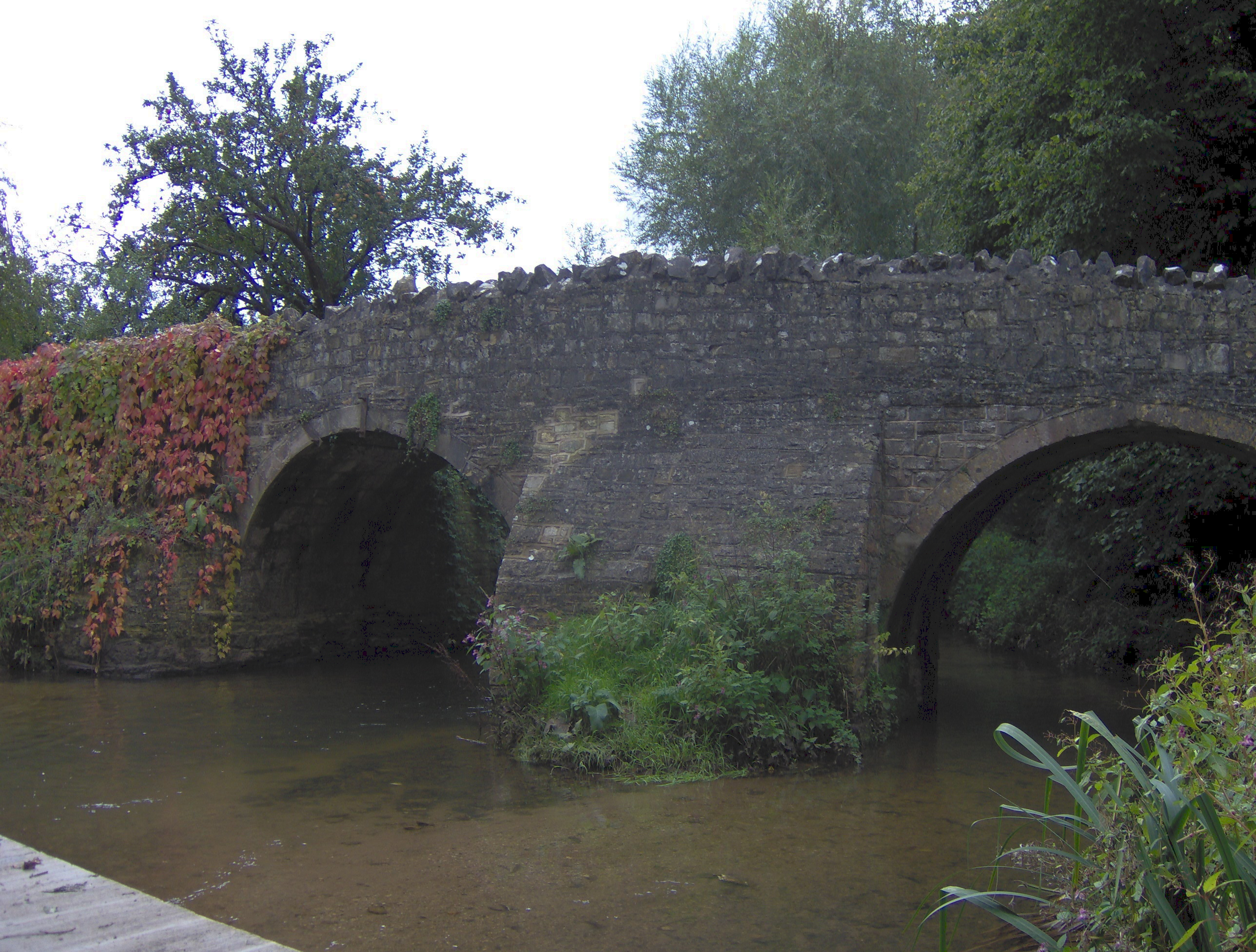
Medieval packhorse bridge over Wellow Brook

There is a low water crossing (Irish Bridge) and late mediaeval packhorse bridge over Wellow Brook.

A little further west is the Neolithic chambered tomb known as Stoney Littleton Long Barrow. The Long Barrow, which is also known as Bath Tumulus and the Wellow Tumulus, is a Neolithic chambered tomb with multiple burial chambers. The barrow is about 30 metres (98 ft) in length and 15 metres (49 ft) wide at the south-east end, it stands nearly 3 metres (10 ft) high. Internally it consists of a 12.8 metres (42 ft) long gallery with three pairs of side chambers and an end chamber. There is a fossil ammonite decorating the left-hand doorjamb. The site was excavated by John Skinner in 1816-17 who gained the entry through a hole originally made about 1760. The excavation revealed the bones (some burned) of several individuals.

The parish gave its name to the Wellow Hundred.

On 26 June 1685 the Duke of Monmouth's rebellious forces made their way from Midford to Norton St. Philip after failing to advance into Bristol and Bath. Their exact route is subject to conjecture, but it is widely assumed that they would have taken their heavy cannons via the Wellow and Norton Brook valleys rather than tackling the steep ascent to Hinton Charterhouse, and that Baggridge would have been used as a vantage point for surveying the route ahead.

In the 1880s and 1890s a small mine extracting and drying Fuller's earth was situated between Wellow and Stoney Littleton and also beside Hassage Hill and Bath Hill linked to the roads by short tramways. The existence of Fullers Earth around Wellow has caused several collapses of local roads and has been used for forensic identification of a vehicle in a murder enquiry.

In World War II the Wellow valley became part of the GHQ stop line green, with defences intended to isolate southern England in the event of German invasion. The remains of a number of type 24 pillboxes and anti-tank cubes can be found in various riverside locations both upstream and downstream of the village.

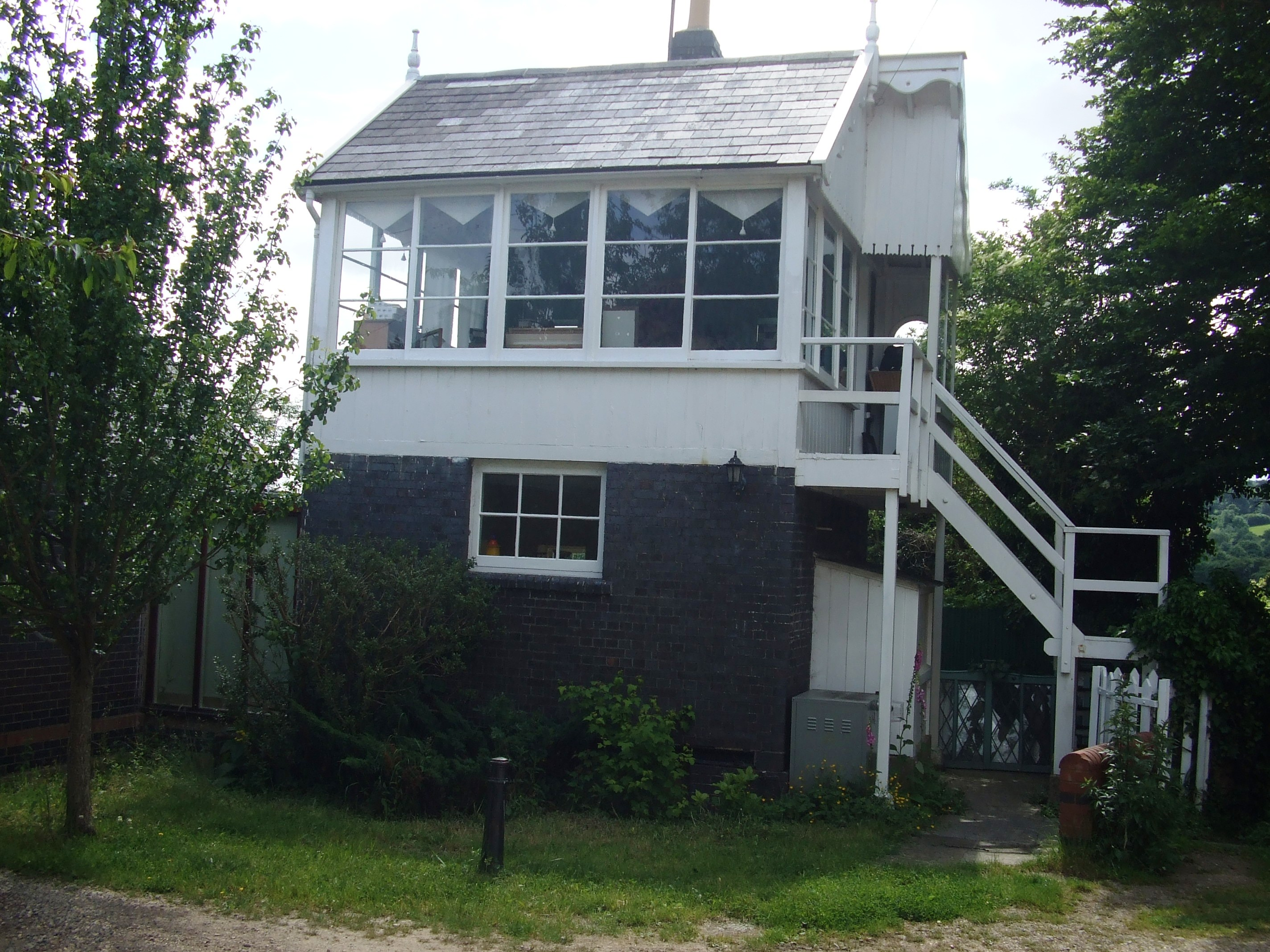
Disused signal box on the Somerset and Dorset Joint Railway, now privately owned

Wellow Station, on the Somerset and Dorset Joint Railway, opened in 1874 and closed in 1966. The station building was converted into a house by the artist Peter Blake and his then wife Jann Haworth, in the mid-1970s. The railway followed the route of the Radstock arm of the Somerset Coal Canal. Although the Camerton branch of the canal was very successful, the Radstock branch was not, mainly because its connection to the main line at Midford involved transhipment via a tramway, and it carried very little traffic. The canal was mainly obliterated by the railway although a sharp bend (still in water) at St Julian's Well, and a tunnel, were bypassed by the viaduct over the foot of Bull's Hill. The railway trackbed East of the village is now part of national cycle route NCR 24, the Colliers Way. From April 2013 the route has a level connection beyond Midford to Bath via the Two Tunnels Greenway. This project was partially funded by auctioning King Bladud's pigs, 104 sculptures decorated by different artists, which were exhibited throughout the Bath area in 2008. Wellow hosted several pigs, including the most expensive of all which was decorated by Peter Blake and housed in the village pub, the Fox and Badger. The cycle route continues westward via Wellow High Street and minor roads to Stoney Littleton and Shoscombe before rejoining the former railways to Radstock and Frome.

== Governance ==
The parish council has responsibility for local issues, including setting an annual precept (local rate) to cover the council's operating costs and producing annual accounts for public scrutiny. The parish council advises the local planning authority on applications and works with the local police, unitary council officers, and neighbourhood watch groups on matters of crime, security, and traffic. The parish council's role also includes initiating projects for the maintenance and repair of public facilities, such as the village hall or community centre, playing fields and playgrounds, as well as consulting with the unitary council on the maintenance, repair, and improvement of highways, drainage, footpaths, public transport, and street cleaning. Conservation matters (including trees and listed buildings) and environmental issues are also of interest to the council.

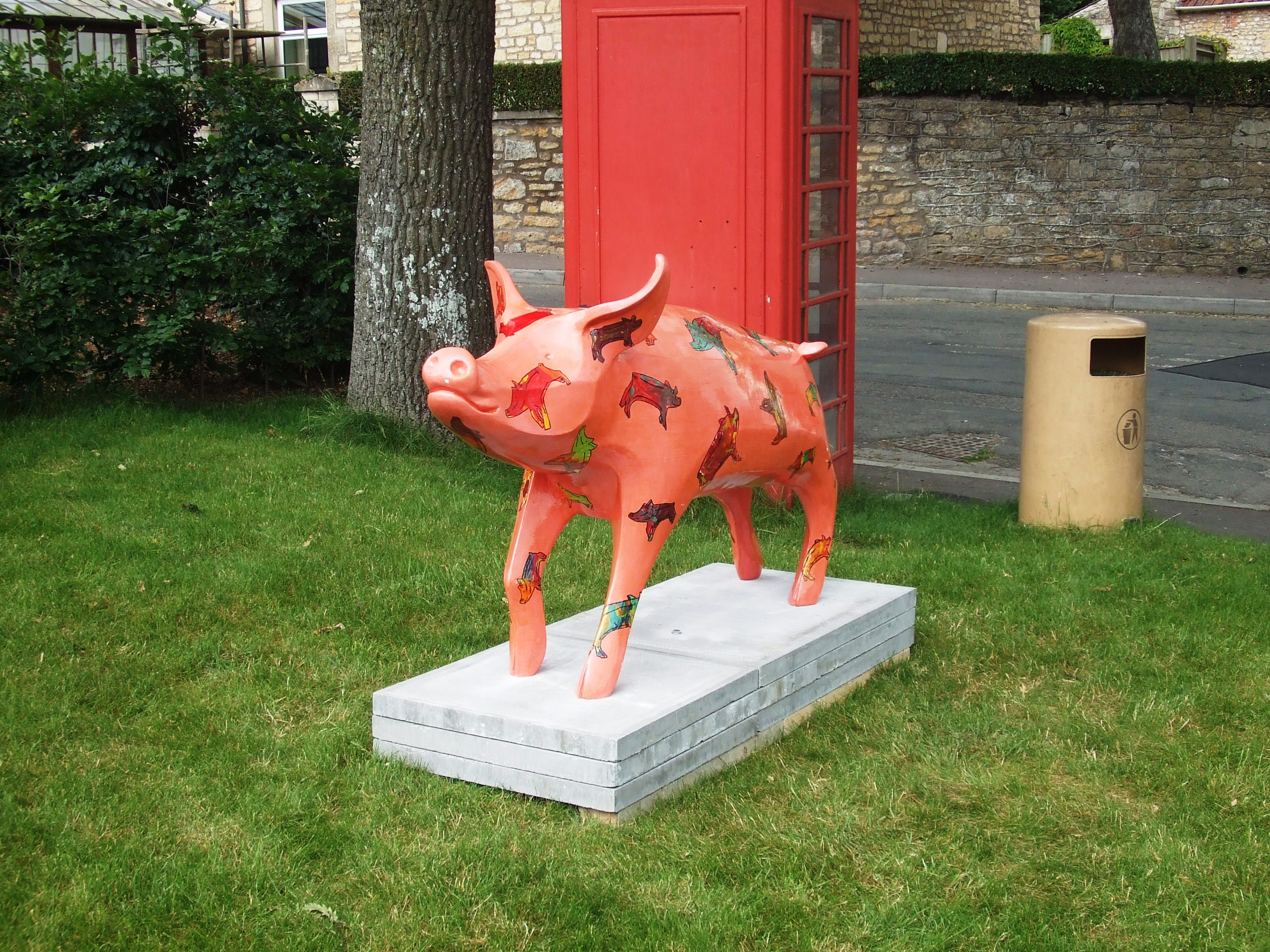
Pig sculpture in the centre of the village

The parish falls within the unitary authority of Bath and North East Somerset which was created in 1996; Bath and North East Somerset's area covers part of the ceremonial county of Somerset but it is administered independently of the non-metropolitan county. Fire, police and ambulance services are provided by the Avon Fire and Rescue Service, Avon and Somerset Constabulary and the Great Western Ambulance Service.

Between 1974 and 1996 Bath and North East Somerset carried out district council functions only, county council services being provided by Avon County Council. Before 1974 the parish was part of the Bathavon Rural District of Somerset.

The parish falls within the constituency of Frome and East Somerset in the British House of Commons, and was also part of the South West England constituency of the European Parliament prior to Britain leaving the European Union in January 2020, which elected seven MEPs.

== Geography ==
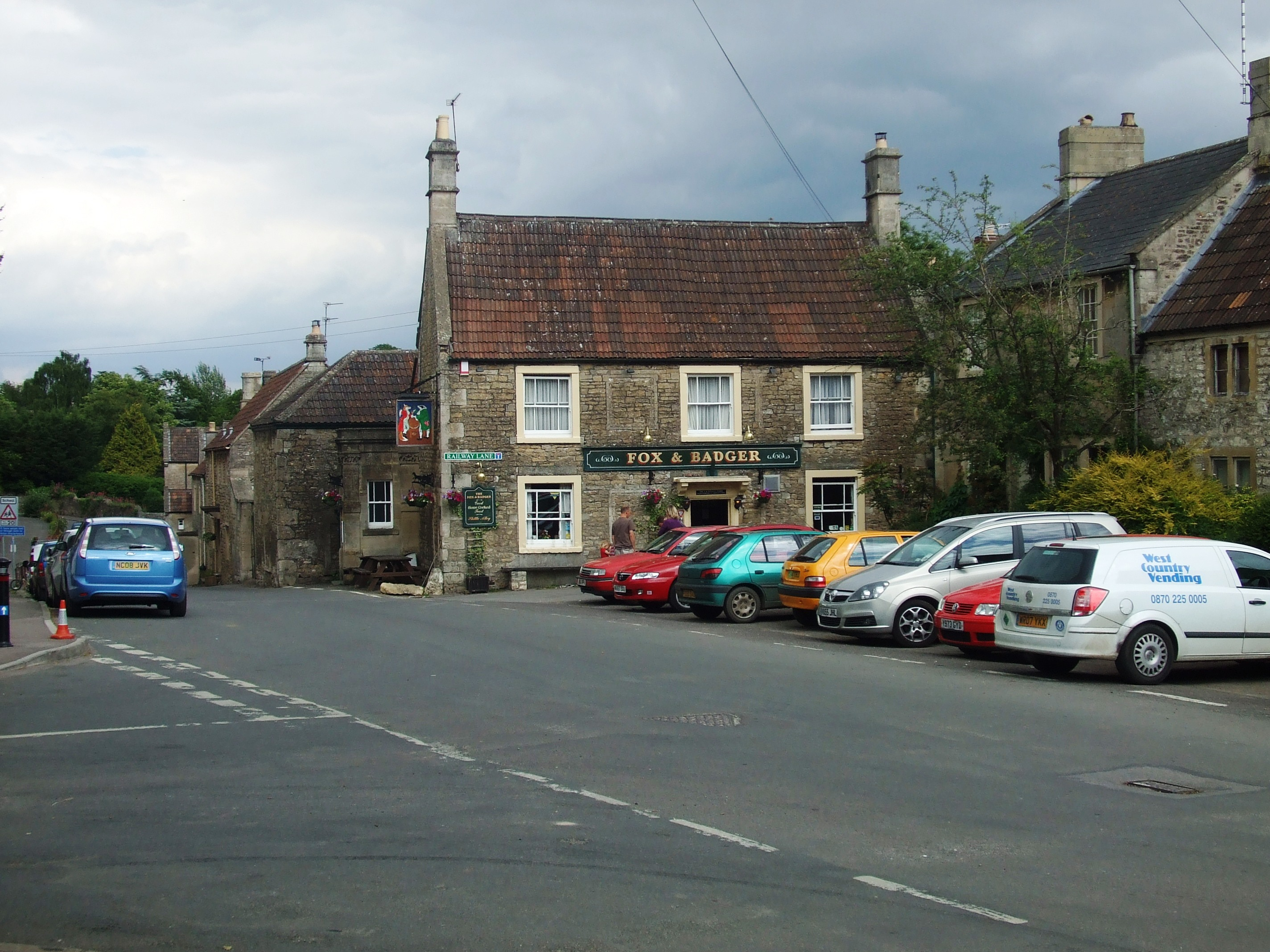
Fox and Badger pub

Nearby are the Hinton Hill and Cleaves Wood sites of Special Scientific Interest.

Wellow Brook rises near Ston Easton Park in the village of Ston Easton and flows east to Midsomer Norton. West of Radstock, it is joined by the River Somer and a tributary from Kilmersdon to the south. It then flows through Wellow before joining the Cam Brook at Midford to form Midford Brook which joins the River Avon close to the Dundas Aqueduct.

Hinton Hill is of importance to studies of the stratigraphy of the Middle Jurassic of the Bath district, and the British Bathonian as a whole.

Cleaves Wood is an ancient, semi-natural deciduous woodland on oolitic limestone. It has a high diversity of tree and shrub species and a large population of the nationally scarce plant spiked star-of-Bethlehem (Ornithogalum pyrenaicum) also known as Bath asparagus. There are also areas of grassland which is lightly grazed by rabbits and is a mosaic of close grazed and rough swards, and wetter areas. The scarce plants found here include the fly orchid and wild daffodil. The habitat diversity of the site has resulted in a rich invertebrate fauna, including two nationally rare insects: the beetle Osphya bipunctata and the hoverfly Cheilosia nigripes. Twenty-seven butterflies have been recorded from the including the nationally scarce species, the Duke of Burgundy (Hamearis lucina). The nationally scarce moth, Blomer's rivulet (Discoloxia blomeri) has also been recorded on the site. Other nationally scarce species include the snail Ena montana, the hoverfly Xanthogramma citrofasciatum, and a number of beetle species.

== Religious sites ==
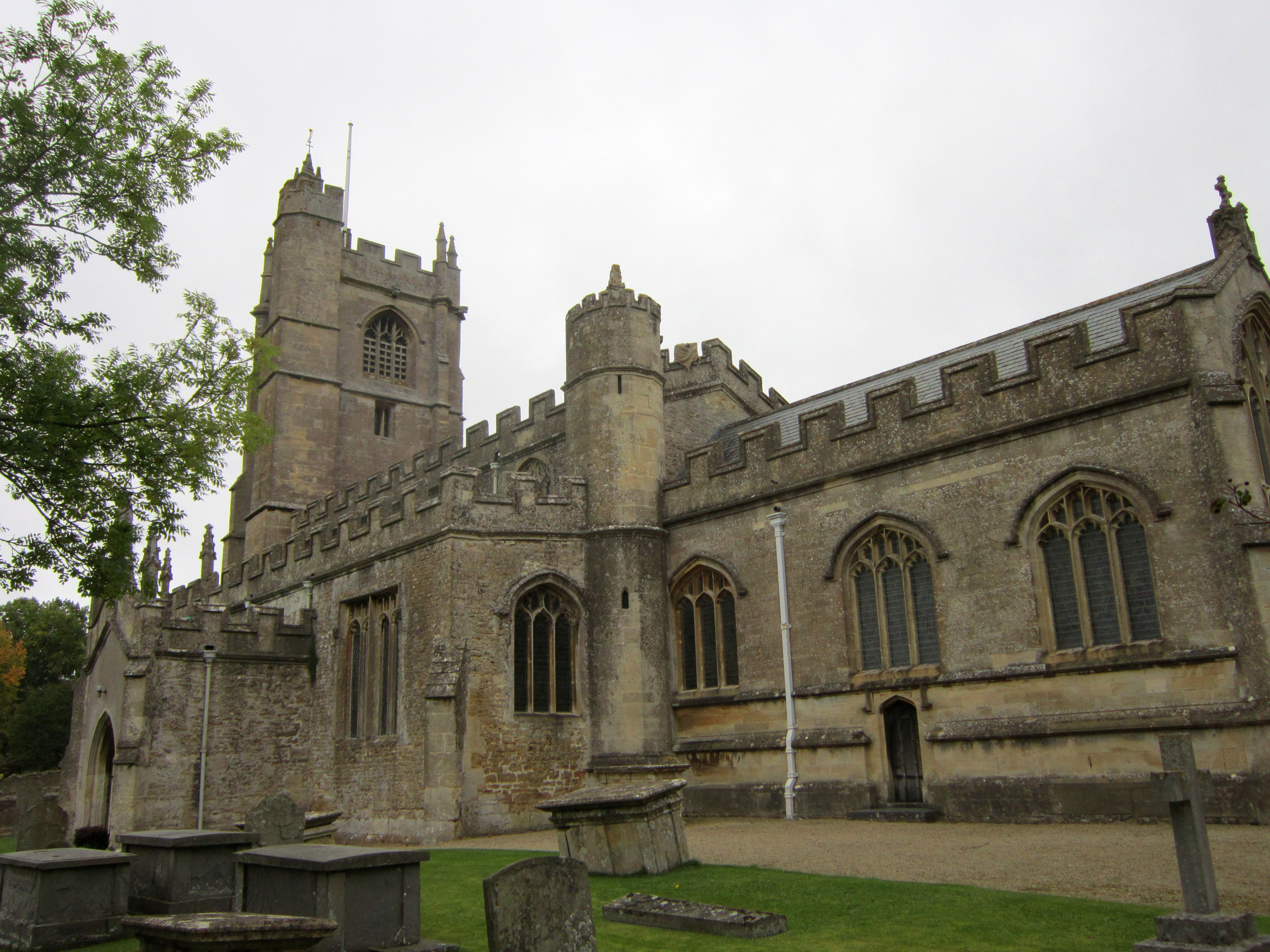
Wellow Church

The parish Church of St Julian, Wellow at Wellow has origins before the 12th century although the present building dates from 1372. The west tower has three stages, set back buttresses with off-sets which turn into diagonal pinnacles in upper stages. There is an embattled parapet with pinnacles. The square stair turret on the south-east corner terminates as an octagon. There is a three-light window to the bell chamber with cusped heads and a similar but larger window with transom to west. It is a Grade I listed building.

== WWI Roll of Honour (situated in St Julian's Church) ==
Edward Owen Bending (15 January 1891 - 24 January 1919) 2nd Lieutenant, King's Own Rifles.

William Brides (2 March 1866 - 27 June 1918) Rifleman, Wessex and Welsh Territorials.

Alfred John Bundy (26 February 1897 - 22 September 1917) Corporal, South Wales Borderers.

Charlie Coombs (28 September 1893 - 16 September 1916) Private, Somerset Light Infantry.

Alfred Isaac Matthew Creese (6 July 1889 - 18 April 1919) Private, Machine Gun Corp.

Reginald Charlie Day (3 May 1891 - 18 October 1919) Private, Territorial Force.

Mark Ford (25 January 1881 - 28 October 1917) Private, Labour Corp.

Uriah Gray (8 February 1885 - 9 October 1918) Private, Welsh Regiment.

Edwin Horler (8 August 1889 - 31 July 1917) 2nd Lieutenant, Machine Gun Corp.

Leonard Arthur Luke (October 1899 - 3 January 1918) Private, RAF Wireless School.

Harry Porter (1882 - 21 October 1914) Private, The British Expeditionary Force.

Charles Pritchard (1886 - 18 November 1914) Private, Somerset Light Infantry.

Joseph Charles Ricketts (1892 - 15 September 1916) Sargent, Royal Field Artillery.

William John Ricketts (1890 - 10 April 1916) Private, Coldstream Guards.

Arthur Edward Selway (30 October 1898 - 3 October 1918) Private, Somerset Light Infantry-Machine Gun Corp.

George Henry Smith (1884 - 29 June 1916) Lance Corporal, Somerset Light Infantry

George L Thomas (research ongoing).

Edward Homer Boxwell Thompson (incorrectly inscribed as Edwin) (14 May 1879 - 13 August 1915) Lieutenant, Somerset Light Infantry.

Edward George Thomas Williams (25 June 1859 - 5 June 1916) Chief Stoker, HMS Hampshire.

Gilbert Henry Williams (31 August 1888 - 22 May 1915) Lance Corporal, Somerset Light Infantry.
