= St John's Church, Peasedown St John =

St John's Church
- Church of St. John Baptist
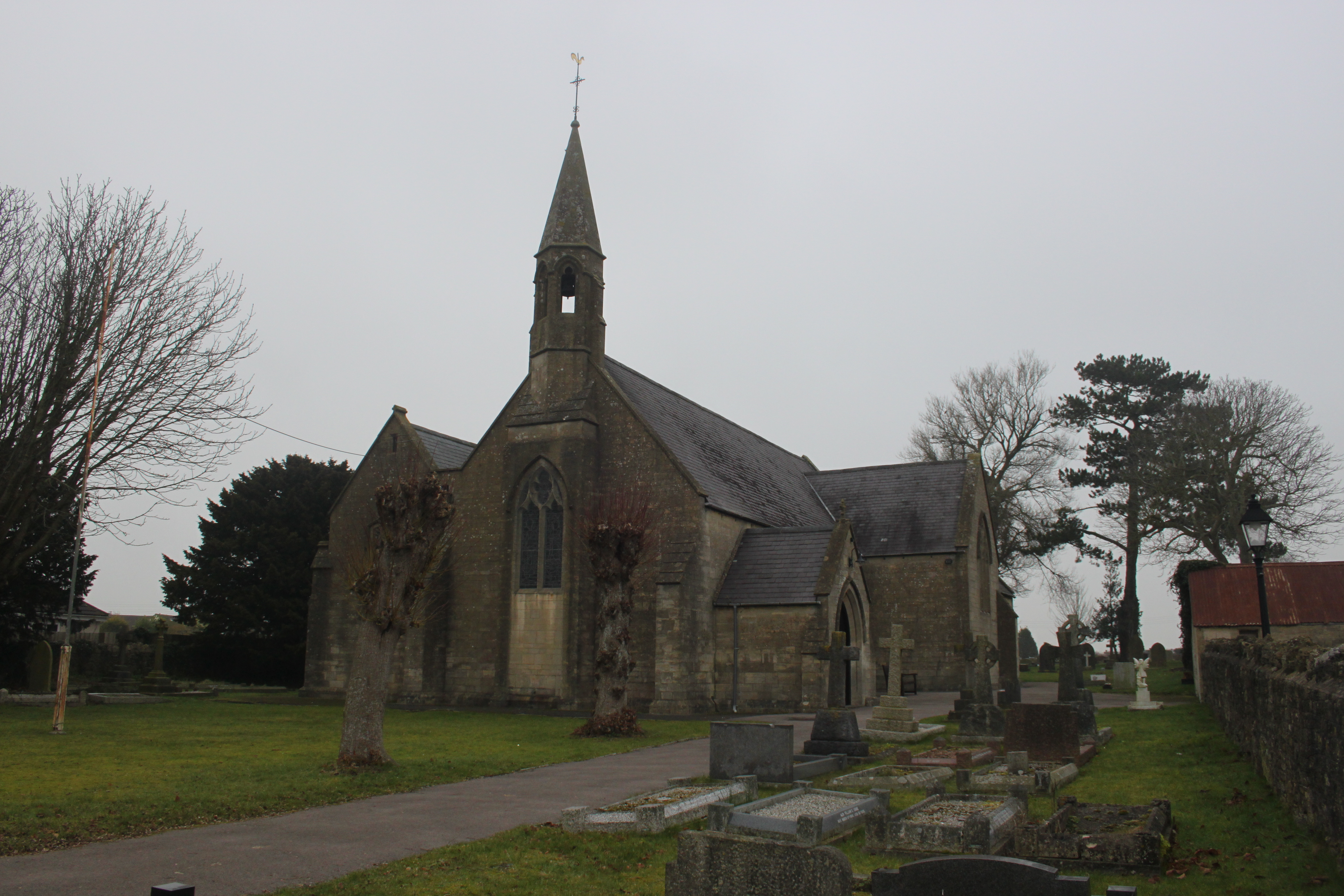

- Shown within Somerset
- 51°18′59″N 2°25′59″W
- Location: Peasedown St John, Somerset
- Country: England
- Denomination: Anglican
- Website: www.stjsgroup.church

History
- Founded: 1874 by Order in Council
- Founder(s): Miss Anna Mary Jarrett and Miss Emily Elizabeth Jarrett of Camerton Court

Architecture
- Architect(s): Bodley and Garner
- Completed: 1893

Administration
- Diocese: Bath and Wells
- Archdeaconry: Bath
- Deanery: Midsomer Norton

Clergy
- Vicar: Revd Matthew G Street

St John's Church, Peasedown St John (or more formally the Church of St John the Baptist, Peasedown) is the Anglican parish church for the village of Peasedown St John in North East Somerset. The Parish was founded in 1874 and the current building dates from 1893. It is home to a congregation drawn largely from the village of Peasedown St John and the surrounding area. The Church now forms part of the ‘St J’s’ Group of Churches, a single benefice also including the parishes of Wellow and Foxcote with Shoscombe.

== Sunday services and regular activities ==
Sunday Services show an emphasis on Bible teaching and on the work of the Holy Spirit. The morning service features organ and keyboard-led worship with Common Worship Liturgy, and the afternoon service features band-led worship. The current weekly pattern of worship consists of:

10.30 Morning Praise every Sunday (Holy Communion on 1st and 3rd Sundays of the month).

16.30 Soulfood Service held at St. John's Church with a Children's Church and refreshments after the service.

== History ==
In 1959 the Patronage of the Church was transferred from the Executors of the late Sir Frank Beauchamp of Woodborough House to the Bishop of Bath and Wells.

The Church was refurbished during the winter of 1989-1990 during which time Services were held in the adjacent Church Hall. The Centenary of the current church building was marked in 1993 with visits from the Bishop of Bath and Wells (the Rt Revd Jim Thompson) and a Solemn Evensong at which the Archdeacon of Bath preached.

== Vicars of the Parish of Peasedown St John ==
- Revd C H Little (1874–1883)
- Revd Charles Gamlen (1883–1908)
- Revd J M Morson (1908–1914)
- Revd F L Sheppard (1914–1927)
- Revd O P Revely (1927–1928)
- Revd R B C Carson (1928–1933)
- Revd E B Rothwell (1933–1954)
- Revd Cyril W Hollinshead (1954–1976)
- Revd R H Peter Hazelton (1976–1989)
- Revd Hugh R L Bonsey (1990–2004)
- Revd Matthew G Street (2005–present)

== See also ==
- List of ecclesiastical parishes in the Diocese of Bath and Wells
