= Hinton Hill, Wellow =

Protected area in Somerset, England

Hinton Hill
- Site of Special Scientific Interest
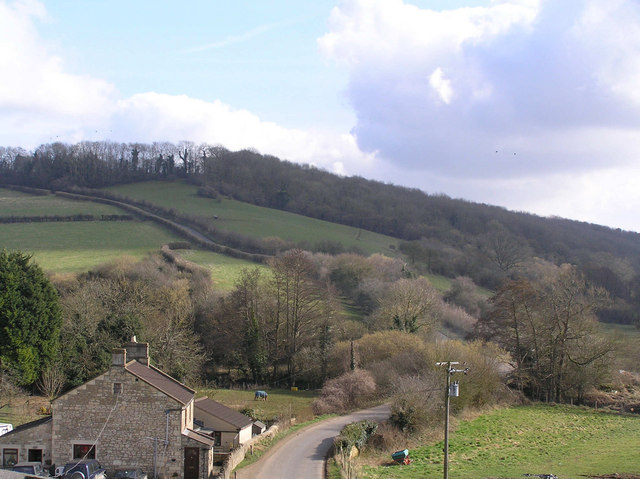

- Location within Somerset
- Location of Hinton Hill.
- Area of search: Avon
- Grid reference: ST757582
- Coordinates: 51.3224°N 2.3501°W
- Interest: Geological
- Area: 0.25 hectares (0.0025 km^{2}; 0.00097 sq mi)
- Notification date: 1996

Hinton Hill, Wellow (grid reference ST757582) is a 0.25 hectare geological Site of Special Scientific Interest (SSSI) near the village of Wellow in Somerset, notified in 1996.

The site is of importance to studies of the stratigraphy of the Middle Jurassic of the Bath district, and the British Bathonian as a whole.

Hinton Hill, Wellow is governed by a local planning authority named Bath and North East Somerset and is named as a Site of Special Scientific Interest.
