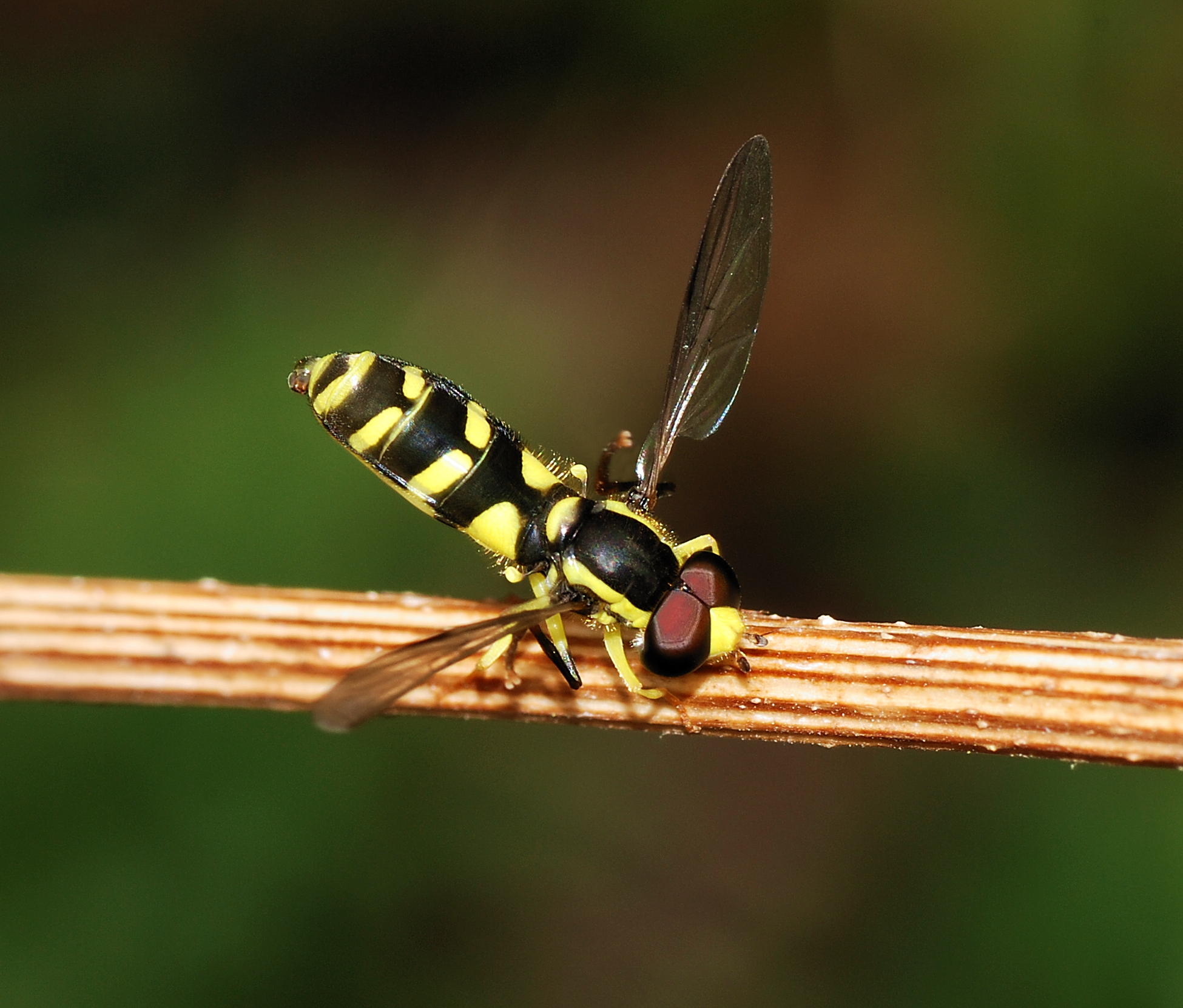
- male
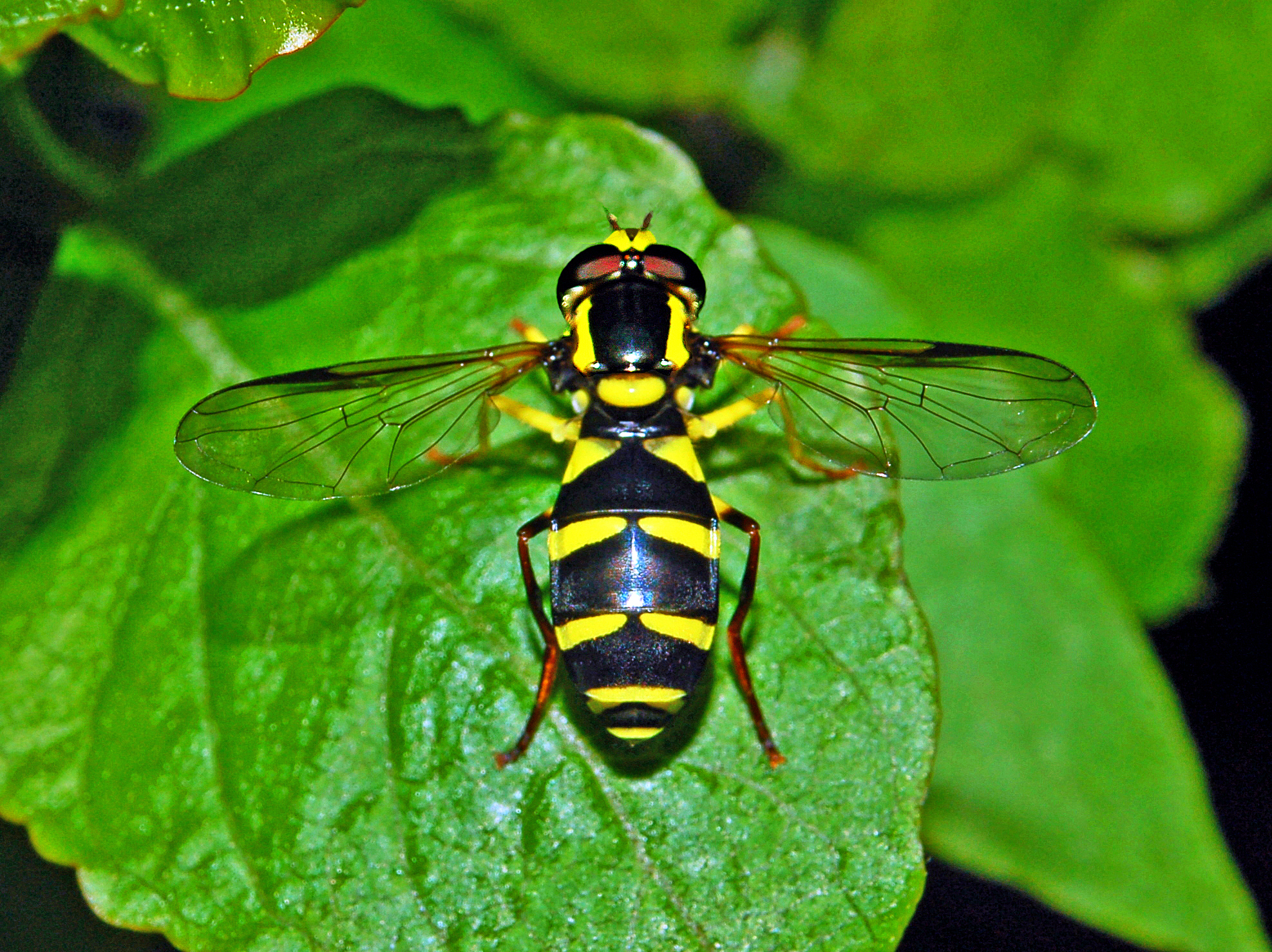
- female

Scientific classification
- Kingdom: Animalia
- Phylum: Arthropoda
- Class: Insecta
- Order: Diptera
- Family: Syrphidae
- Genus: Philhelius
- Species: P. pedissequus

Binomial name
- Philhelius pedissequus (Harris, 1776)

Synonyms
- List: Doros decoratus Zetterstedt, 1843; Musca pedissequum Harris, 1776; Scaeva flavicincta Gravenhorst, 1807; Syrphus dives Rondani, 1857; Syrphus ornatum Meigen, 1822; Syrphus pulcher Meigen, 1835; Xanthogramma bilobatum Szilády, 1940; Xanthogramma flavifrons Szilády, 1940; Xanthogramma flavipleura Coe, 1957; Xanthogramma nigripes Szilády, 1940; Xanthogramma nobilitatum Frey, 1946; Xanthogramma ornatum (Meigen, 1822)

= Philhelius pedissequus =

Species of fly

Philhelius pedissequus is a species of hoverfly. Prior to 2018, it was known under the genus name Xanthogramma, a junior synonym.

== Etymology ==
The Latin species name pedissequus means that follows on foot, like an attendant.

== Distribution and habitat ==
This uncommon species is present in most of Europe, in Western Siberia, in the Near East and in North Africa. It prefers grassland, open fields close to deciduous forest.

== Description ==
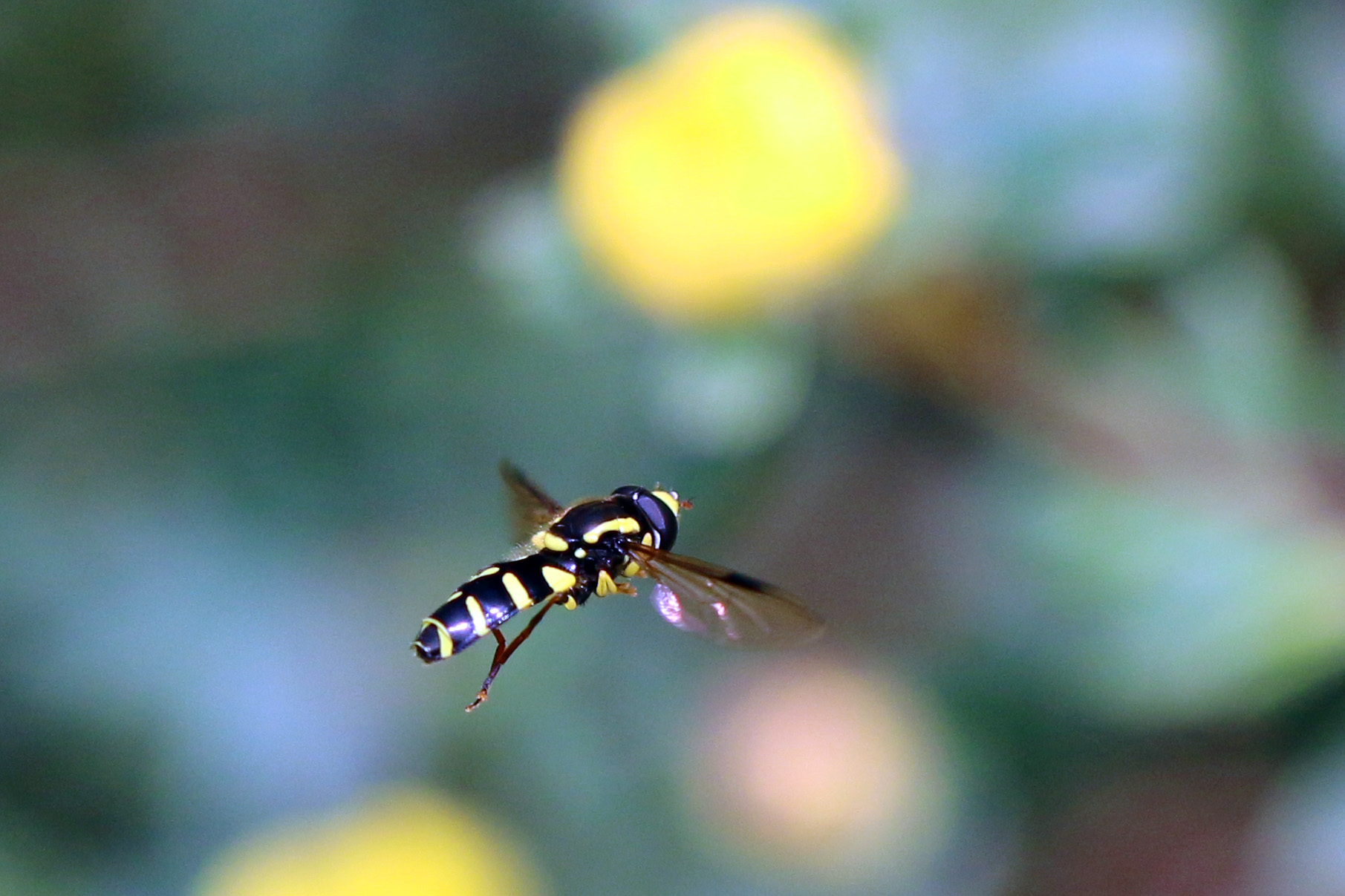
In flight

Philhelius pedissequus can reach a length of 10–13 millimetres (0.39–0.51 in) and a wing length of 7.25–9.75 mm. These hoverflies have a black body, with two yellow lateral stripes on the thorax, and yellow markings on tergites two to five. The pairs of tergites 2 are wedge-shaped and considerably wide.

Video clip

== Biology ==
Flight period last from mid May through September, with a peak at the end of June. The adults feed on different flowers, for example, Ballota nigra, Potentilla erecta and Heracleum sphondylium. Little is known of its larval stages. Larvae have been found underground in nests of the black garden ant (Lasius niger) and yellow meadow ant (Lasius flavus), probably to feed on ant-attended root aphids Forda formicaria and Trama species that they collect.
