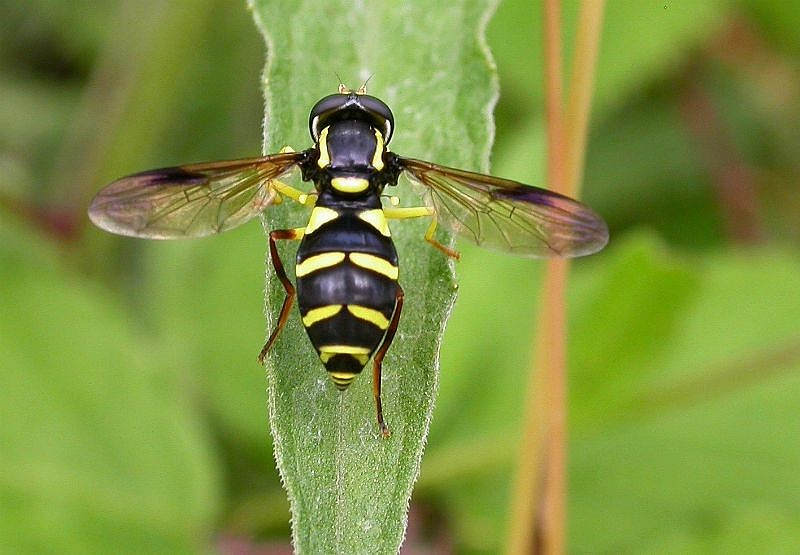
- Philhelius pedissequus

Scientific classification
- Kingdom: Animalia
- Phylum: Arthropoda
- Class: Insecta
- Order: Diptera
- Family: Syrphidae
- Tribe: Syrphini
- Genus: Philhelius; Stephens, 1841

Species
- See text

Synonyms
- Xanthogramma Schiner, 1860

= Philhelius =

Genus of flies

Philhelius sp., male

Philhelius are moderate to large hoverflies, most are somewhat wasp like. Little is known of their biology. Prior to 2018, they were known under the genus name Xanthogramma, a junior synonym.

== Species ==
- Philhelius anisomorphum (Huo, Ren & Zheng, 2007)
- Philhelius caucasicus (Violovitsh, 1975)
- Philhelius citrofasciatus (De Geer, 1776)
- Philhelius coreanus (Shiraki, 1930)
- Philhelius dives (Rondani, 1857)
- Philhelius evanescens (Becker & Stein 19137)
- Philhelius flavipes (Loew, 1863)
- Philhelius hissaricus (Violovitsh, 1975)
- Philhelius kirgiristanus (Enderlein 19387)
- Philhelius laetus (Fabricius, 1794)
- Philhelius maculipennis (Mik, 1887)
- Philhelius marginalis (Loew, 1854)
- Philhelius pedissequus (Harris, 1778)
- Philhelius qinlingensis (Huo, Ren & Zheng, 2007)
- Philhelius sapporensis (Matsumura, 1916)
- Philhelius seximaculatus (Huo, Ren & Zheng, 2007)
- Philhelius sichotanus (Violovitsh, 1975)
- Philhelius stackelbergi (Violovitsh, 1975)
