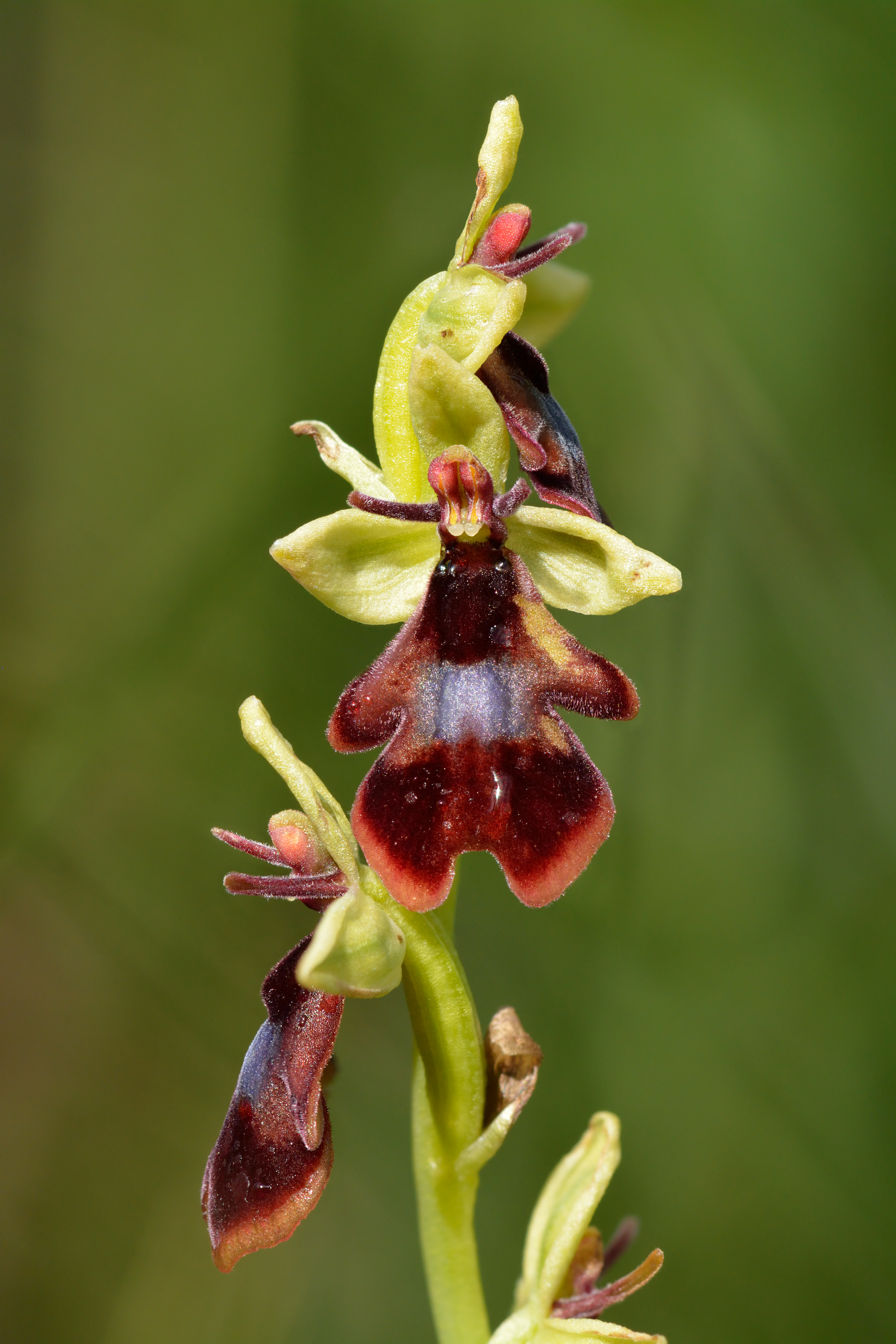

Conservation status
- Least Concern (IUCN 3.1)

Scientific classification
- Kingdom: Plantae
- Clade: Tracheophytes
- Clade: Angiosperms
- Clade: Monocots
- Order: Asparagales
- Family: Orchidaceae
- Subfamily: Orchidoideae
- Genus: Ophrys
- Species: O. insectifera

Binomial name
- Ophrys insectifera L.

Synonyms
- Epipactis myodes (Jacq.) F.W.Schmidt; Malaxis myodes (Jacq.) Bernh.; Ophrys insectifera var. myodes L.; Ophrys myodes (L.) Jacq. (nom. illeg.); Orchis insectifera (L.) Crantz; Orchis myodes (Jacq.) Bernh.

= Ophrys insectifera =

Species of flowering plant in the orchid family

Ophrys insectifera, the fly orchid, is a species of orchid and the type species of the genus Ophrys. It is remarkable as an example of the use of sexually deceptive pollination and floral mimicry, as well as a highly selective and highly evolved plant–pollinator relationship.

== Description ==
Ophrys insectifera is a tuberous perennial, reaching 60 cm (2 ft) in height, which flowers across its range from May to July. It is a slender plant, with narrow upright leaves. A flower spike may carry 1–10 flowers, which have yellow-green sepals, very reduced, dark brown/black petals resembling the antennae of an insect and a long, narrow, lobed labellum, which is dark in color, varying from maroon to black and on which there are two glossy depressions known as 'pseudo-eyes' as well as an iridescent blue/grey patch evolved to resemble an insect's glistening wings. There is a rare yellow-flowered form of O. insectifera. Chromosomes 2n=36

== Taxonomy ==
The genus name "Ophrys" derives from the Greek word "ophrys", meaning eyebrow, while the Latin epithet "insectifera" means insect-bearing or insect-carrying, referring to the unusual appearance of the flowers.

== Distribution and habitat ==
It is native to Europe, growing further north than most other species in the genus Ophrys, in Scandinavia, Finland and the Baltic states, and as far south as Greece and Spain. In the UK it is a rare species, with a southern distribution.

The plant favours sites with damp, alkaline, unimproved soil. It can be found growing in beech woodlands, on forest edges, in scrub, on limestone pavement, limestone grassland, in chalk pits and wet meadows, on cliffs as well as on disused railways.

== Ecology ==
The name arises because its inflorescence resembles a fly, although it relies on Hymenoptera for pollination. In the UK O. insectifera is pollinated by just two species of digger wasp: Argogorytes mystaceus and Argogorytes fargeii. The orchid uses scent to attract male wasps which pollinate the flowers as they attempt to mate with them. The scent released by the flowers mimic female sexual pheromones.

Both of the wasp species which pollinate fly orchids in the UK feed on Umbellifer flowers as adults and on froghopper nymphs as larvae. A. mystaceus reproduces in woodland glades, while A. fargeii reproduces in open, sparsely-vegetated habitats.

Like most orchids, Ophrys insectifera depends upon a relationship with a mycorrhizal fungus in the soil around its roots. In experiments it has been found to grow in association with fungi in the Tulasnellaceae family. Due to the importance of this mycorrhizal partnership, orchids are particularly vulnerable to fungicide, but also other chemicals which could impact the growth of soil fungi or cause different fungi/bacteria species to dominate the soil they grow in.

== Conservation ==
Worldwide, this species is considered 'least concern', however in Great Britain its conservation status is 'vulnerable'.

This species is mainly threatened by habitat destruction, which takes several forms: drainage of fens, coniferization of woodland and decline in coppicing of woodland. As it has a very specialized relationship with its pollinators it is also theorized to be particularly vulnerable to climate change.

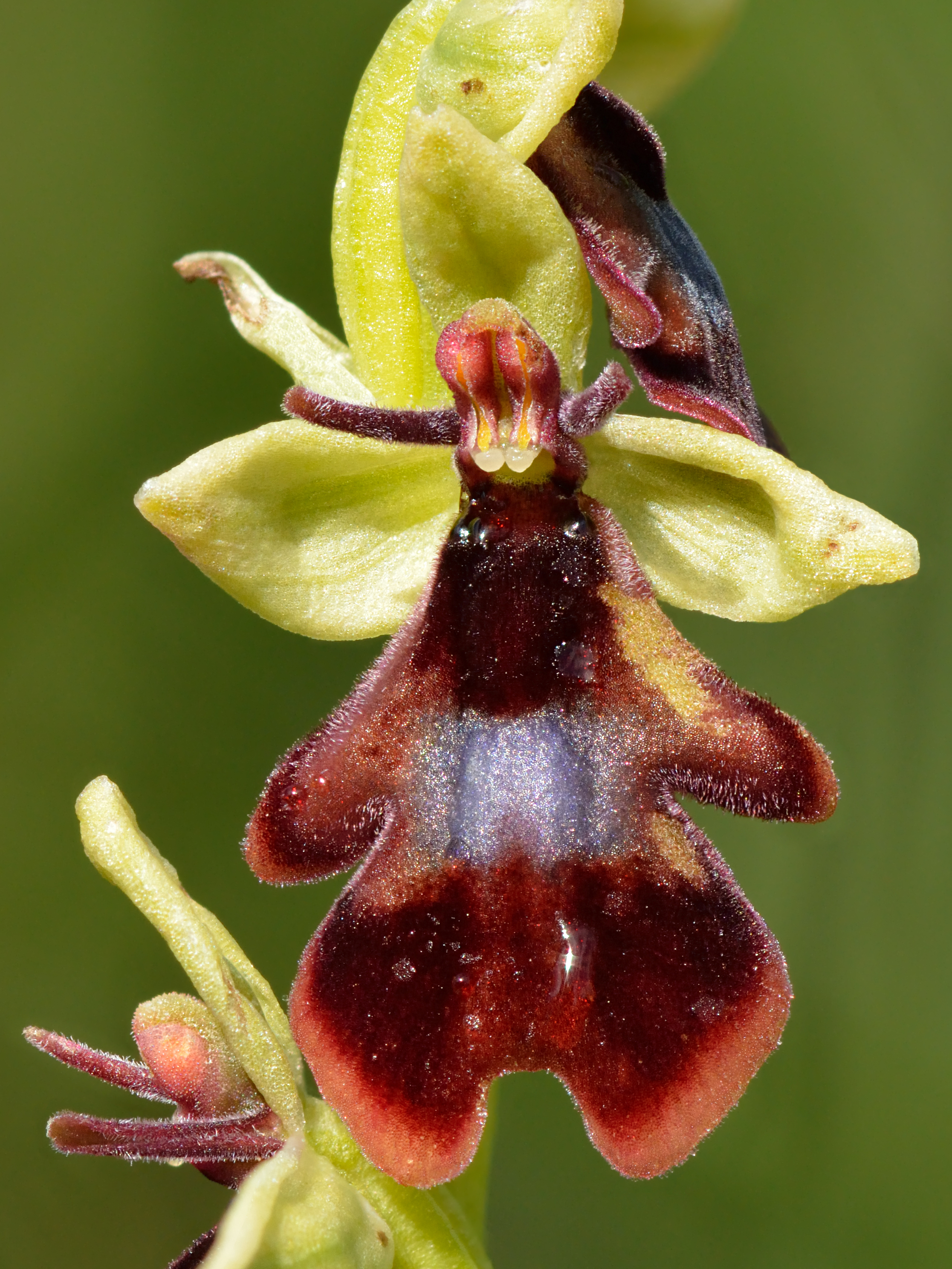
A close-up of the flower, clearly showing the iridescent pseudo-wings, pseudo-antennae, and pseudo-eyes

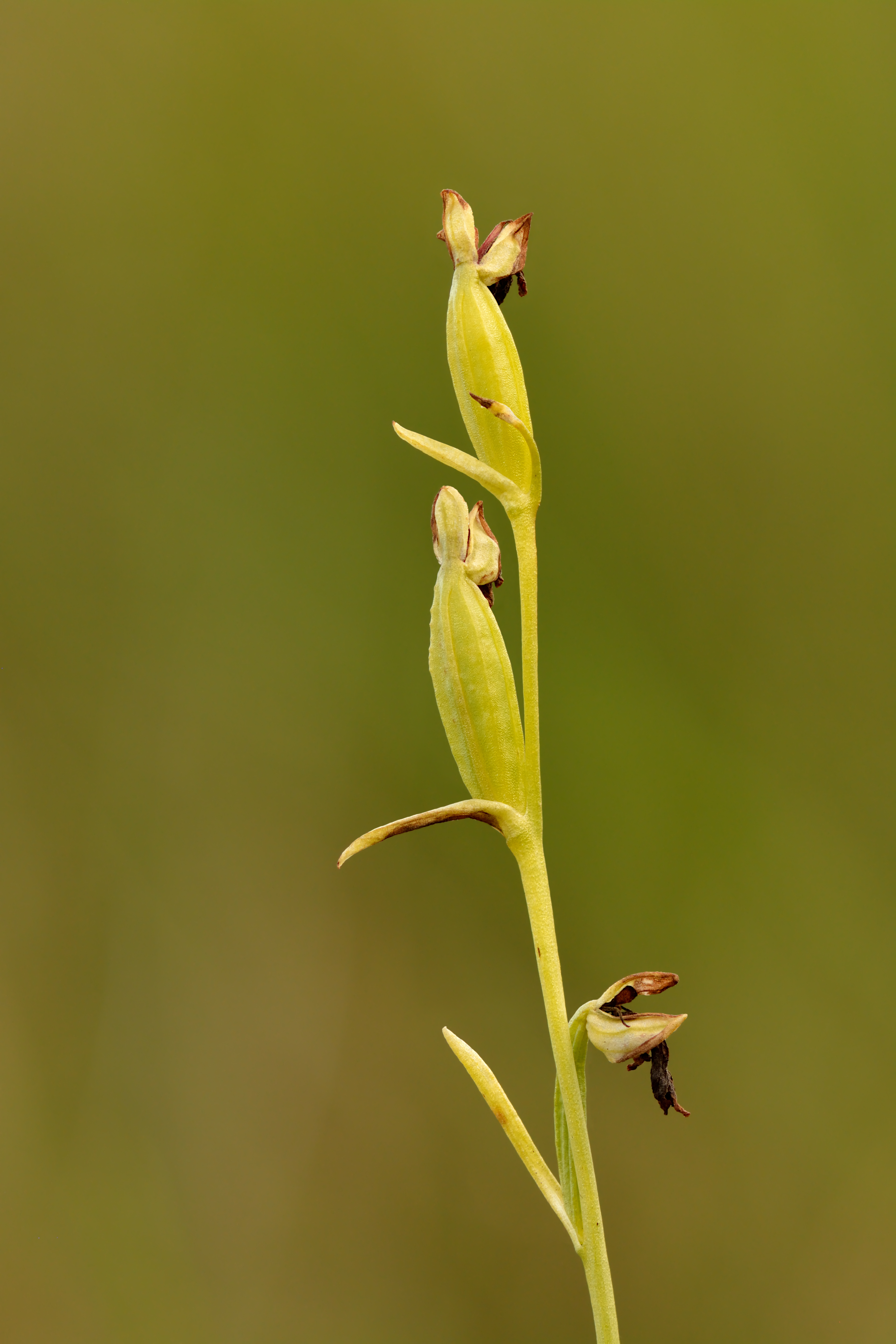
Infructescence

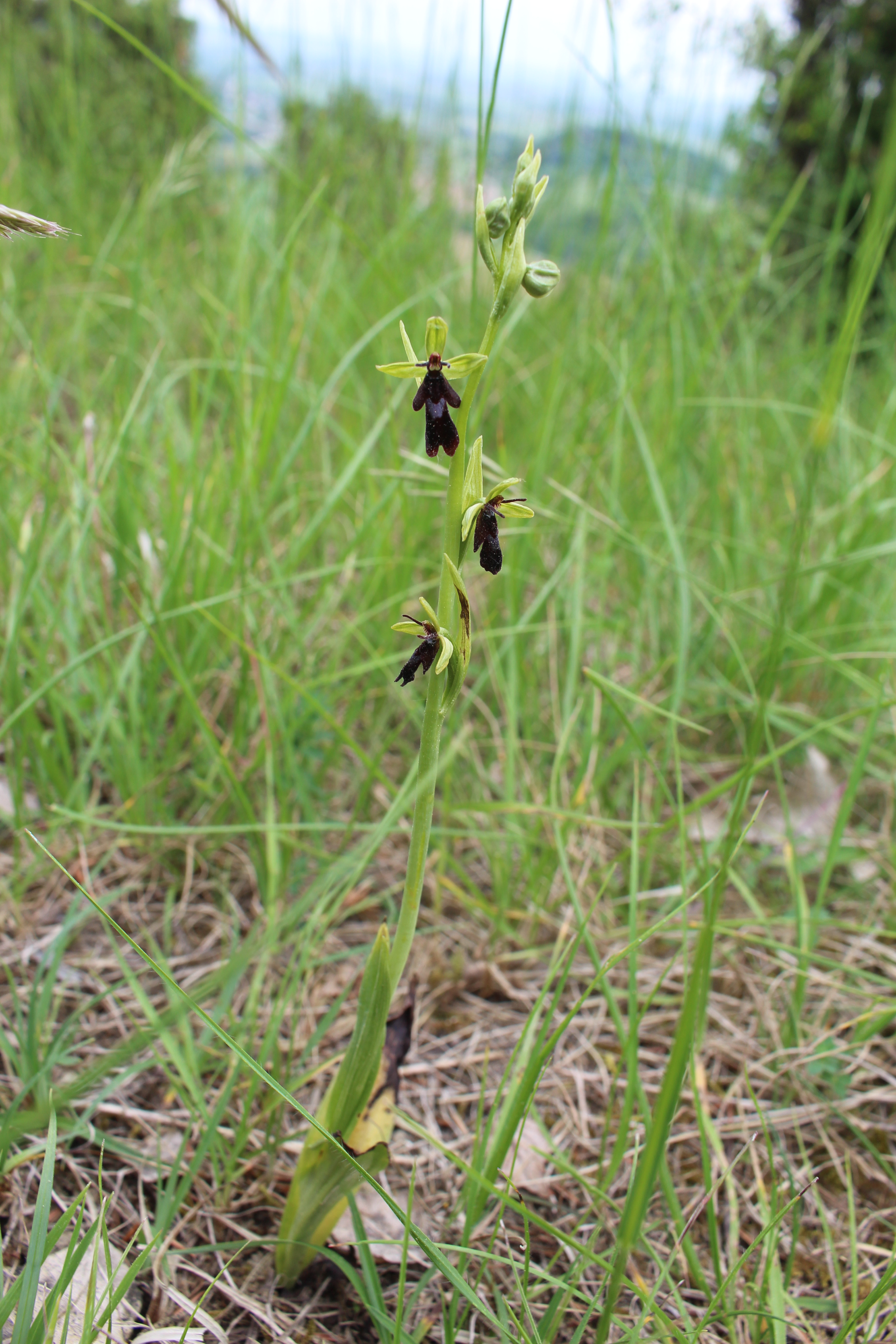
Habit of an individual of Ophrys insectifera at the Altendorfer Berg in Niedersachsen, Germany

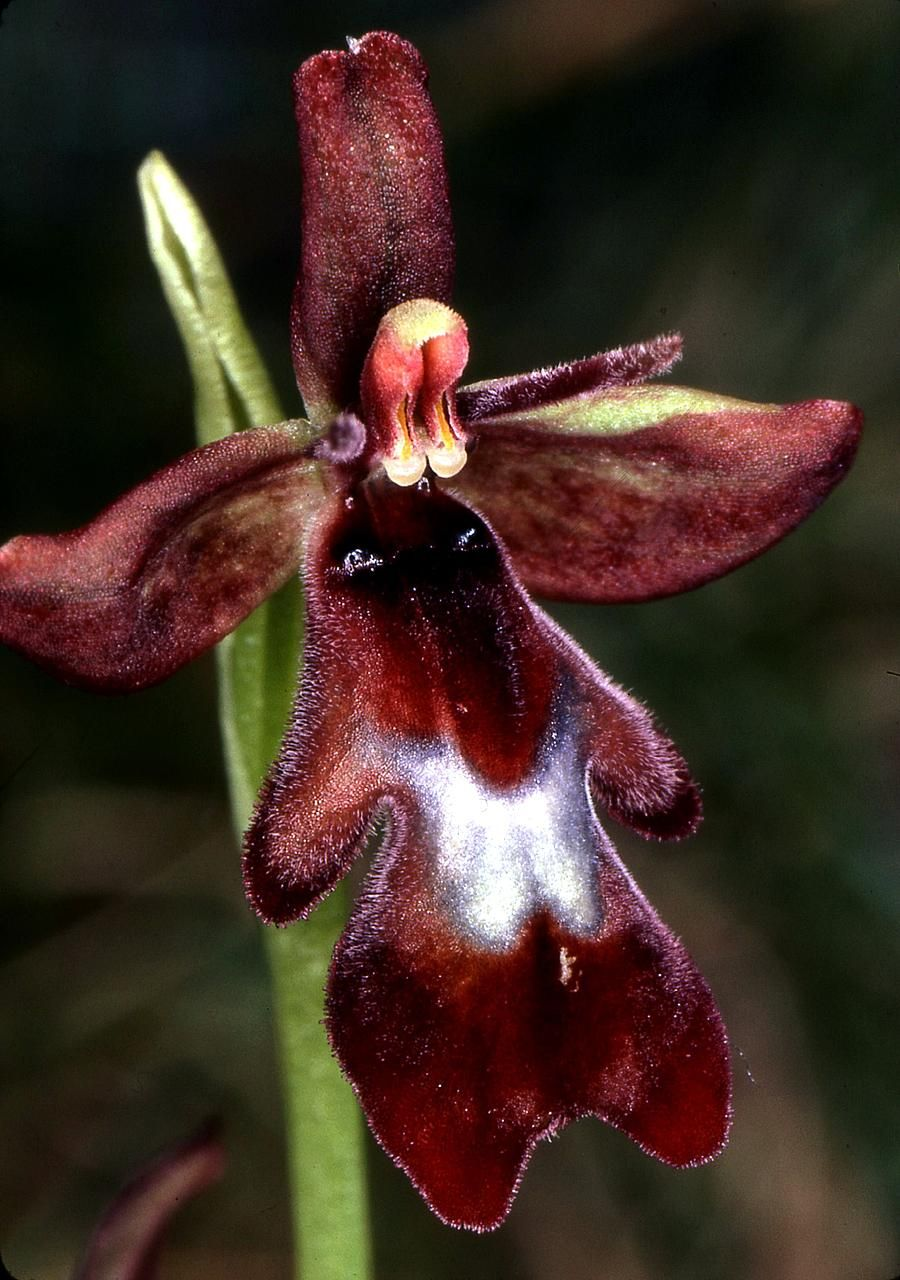
An unusual colour variation, photographed in Saarland, Germany

== See also ==
- Galley Down Wood
- Cleaves Wood
