= Church of St Julian, Wellow =

St. Julian's Church Wellow, Somerset, England

St Julian's Church, Wellow
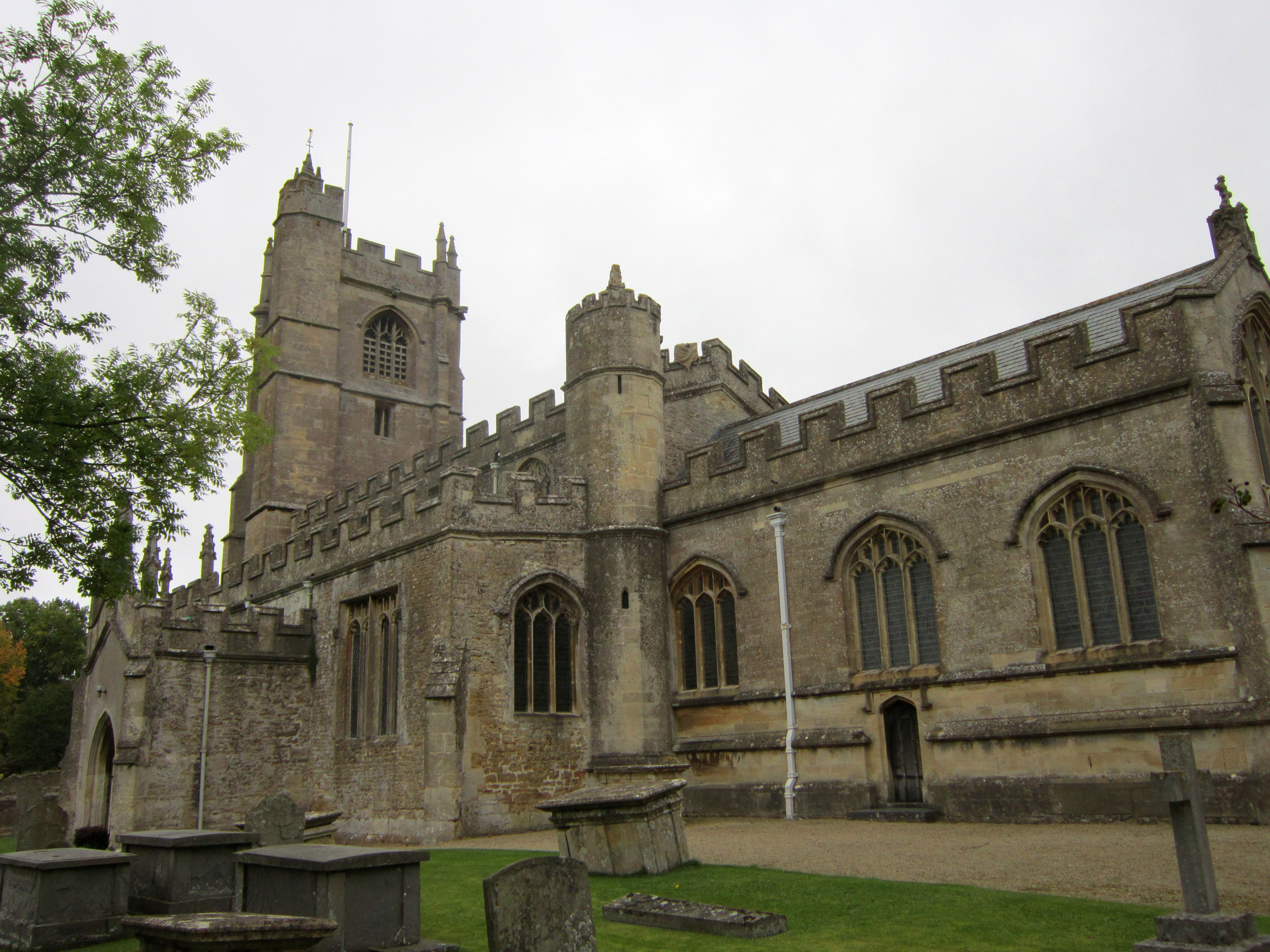

- Location within Somerset
- 51°19′28″N 2°22′21″W
- Location: Wellow, Somerset, England

History
- Built: 1372

Listed Building – Grade I
- Official name: Parish Church of St Julian
- Designated: 1 February 1956
- Reference no.: 1115330

The Church of St Julian in Wellow, Somerset, England has origins before the 12th century although the present building dates from 1372. It has been designated as a Grade I listed building. The church was rebuilt by Sir Thomas Hungerford and consecrated in 1372. Its west tower was built around 1475.

== History ==
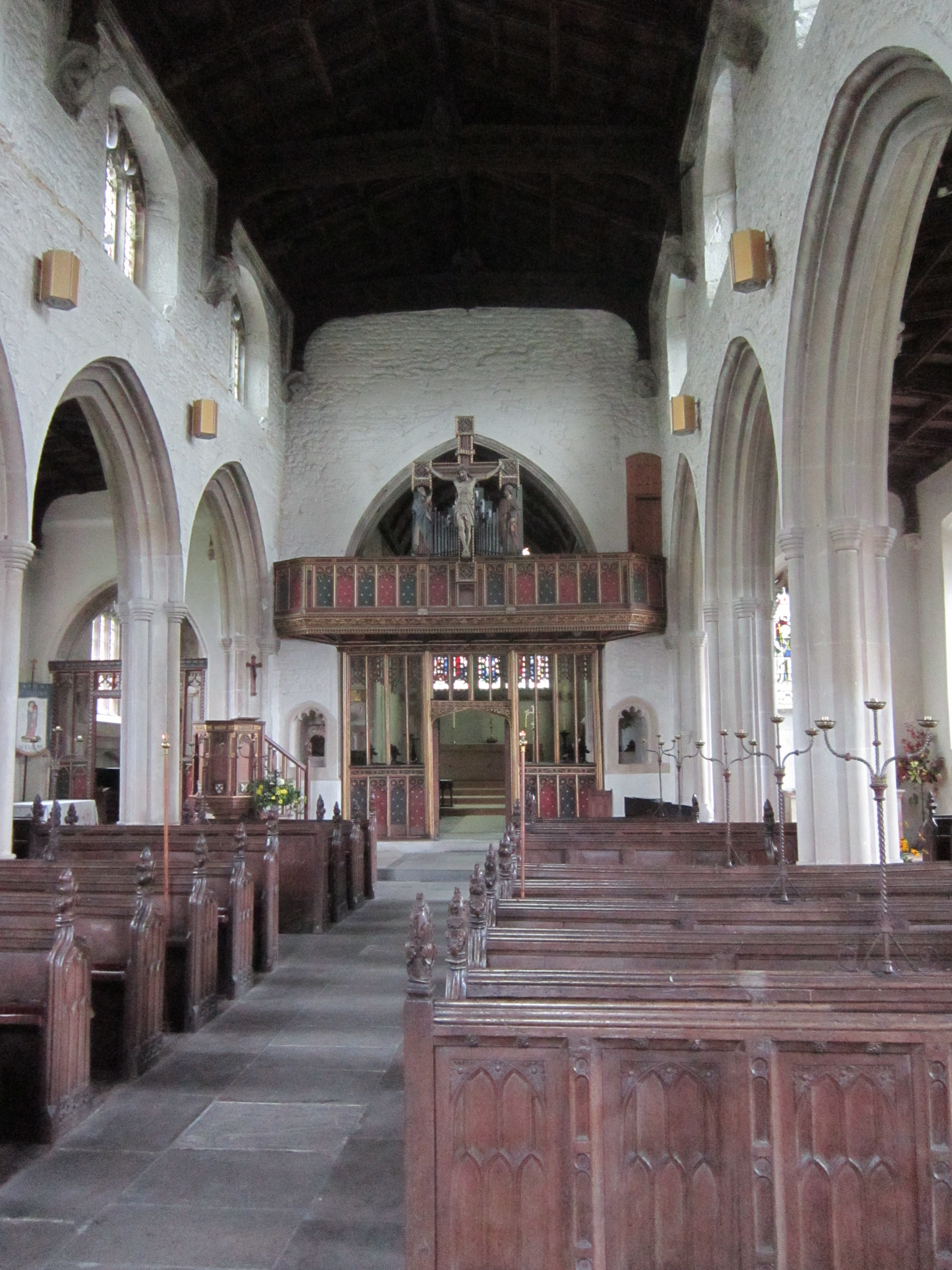
Interior of the church

The church is believed to have Roman origins in connection with a local villa and the dedication to Julian the Hospitaller may support this claim. A statue of St Julian holding an oar is displayed in a niche above the porch. It is known that Wellow was granted to monastery of St. Andrew at Wells, now Wells Cathedral, in 766 by the King of the West Saxons. In 1117 it was given, along with Frome to an order of Augustinian Canons at Cirencester (now Cirencester Abbey by Henry I. This affiliation is confirmed by a charter signed by Edward III in 1337. In 1369 Sir Thomas Hungerford bought Wellow and rebuilt the church which was consecrated on May Day in 1372 by John Harewell, Bishop of Bath and Wells.

== Services ==
Part of the wider benefice of The St J's Group including Peasedown St. John and Foxcote with Shoscombe. Church services occur each Sunday at 10am with refreshments afterwards. The third Sunday of the month is an all age worship service and Holy Communion occur on the 2nd Sunday of the month.

See more via the website at www.stjsgroup.church.

== Architecture ==
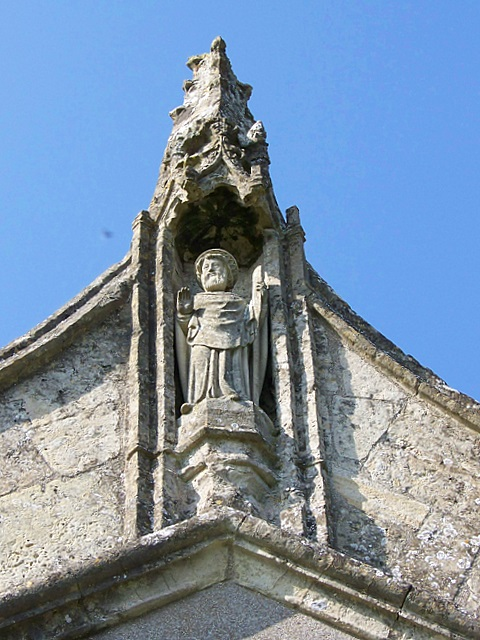
Statue of St Julian holding an oar

The Porch has a 14th-century oak door. The east end of the south aisle bears a scratch dial of a Sundial. The octagonal south rood stair turret dates from around 1450 however most of the chancel is from a 19th-century refurbishment. The nave includes a clerestory which was added around the middle of the 15th century along with the Rood Screen. The font dates from around 1250 but has undergone several restorations. The Hungerford Chapel contains 15th century wall paintings of Christ and the twelve apostles dating from the 15th century and several monuments to the Hungerford family.

The 84 feet (26 m) west tower, which was built around 1475, has three stages, set back buttresses with off-sets which turn into diagonal pinnacles in upper stages. There is an embattled parapet with pinnacles. The square stair turret on the south-east corner terminates as an octagon. There is a three-light window to the bell chamber with cusped heads and a similar but larger window with transom to west.

== See also ==
- List of Grade I listed buildings in Bath and North East Somerset
- List of towers in Somerset
- List of ecclesiastical parishes in the Diocese of Bath and Wells
