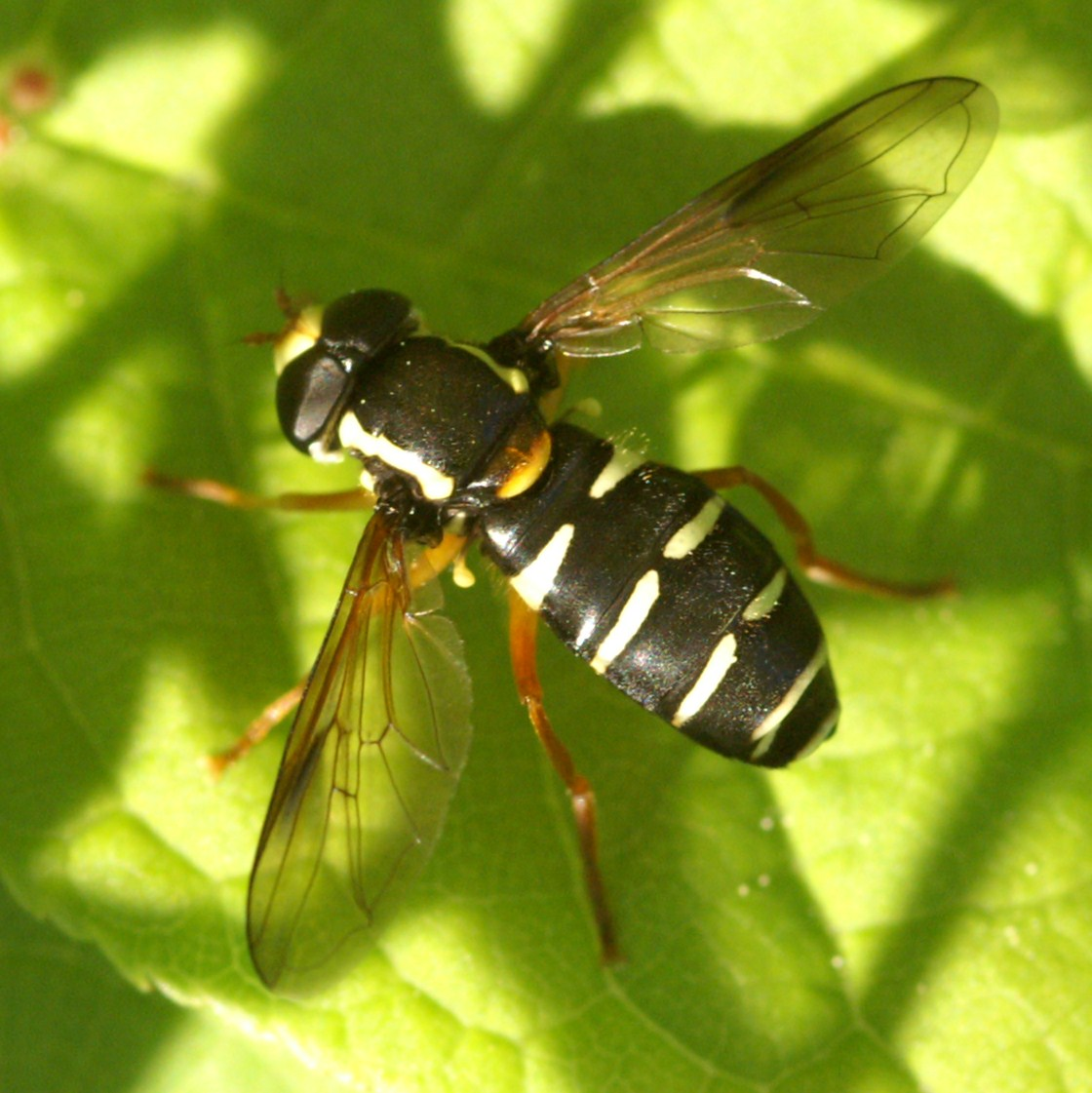
- Male

Scientific classification
- Kingdom: Animalia
- Phylum: Arthropoda
- Class: Insecta
- Order: Diptera
- Family: Syrphidae
- Genus: Philhelius
- Species: P. citrofasciatus

Binomial name
- Philhelius citrofasciatus (De Geer, 1776)

Synonyms
- Musca citrofasciata De Geer, 1776; Xanthogramma citrofasciatum (De Geer, 1776)

= Philhelius citrofasciatus =

Species of fly

Philhelius citrofasciatus is a species of hoverfly found in grasslands from Ireland to western Siberia. The larvae live in Lasius ant colonies where they feed on the aphids tended by the ants. Prior to 2018, it was known under the genus name Xanthogramma, a junior synonym.

== Description ==
External images For terms see Morphology of Diptera
Wing length 6·5–10·25 mm. Legs yellow coxae and trochanters black. Femora and tibiae 3 are completely pale. Yellow marks on tergite 2 linear (not equilateral triangles). Tergites 2–4 with subequal yellow marks. See references for determination.

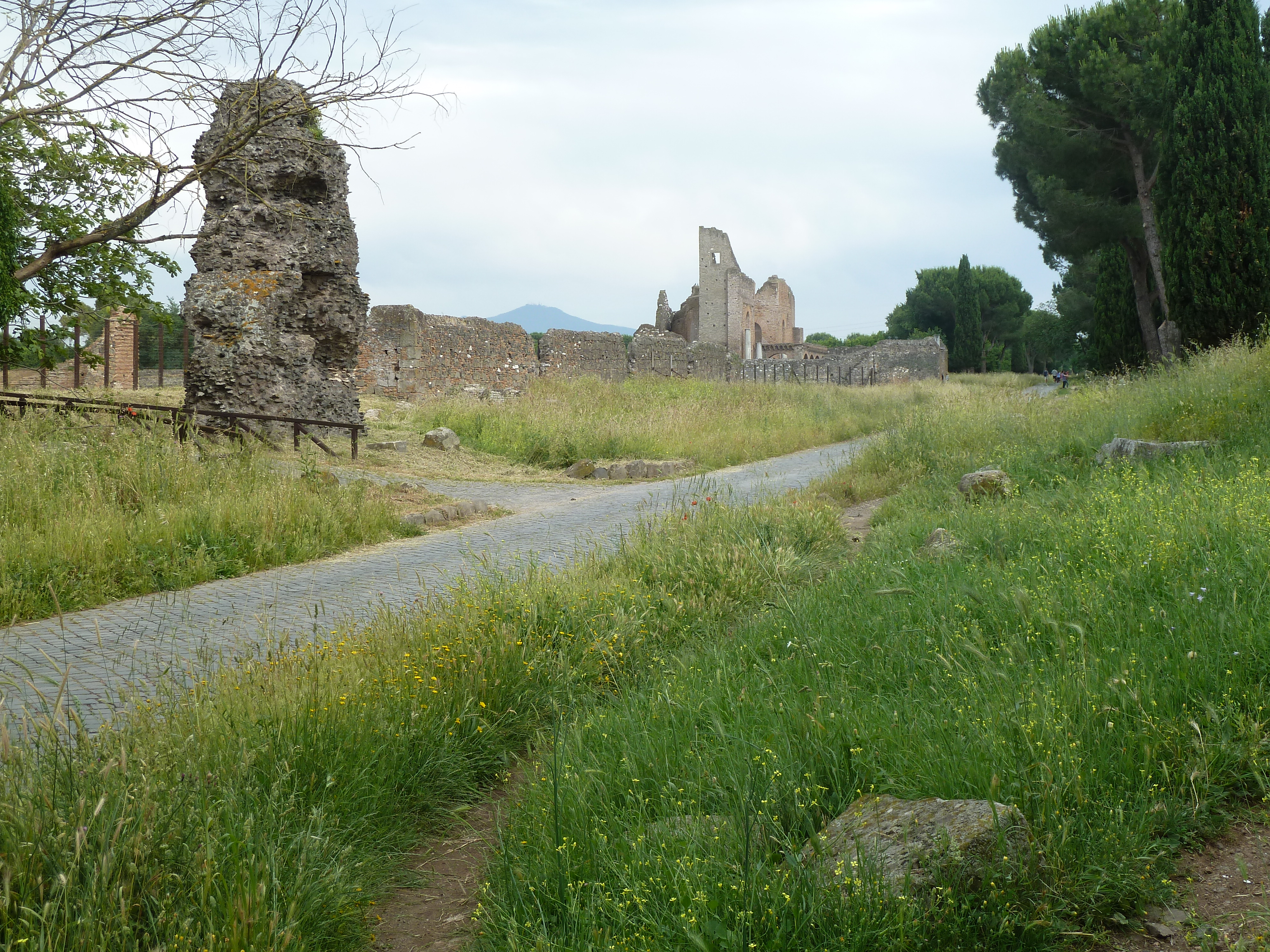
Habitat.Italy

== Distribution ==
Palearctic. South Norway to Iberia. Ireland East through Central Europe and South Europe into European Russia and Yugoslavia and the Caucasus, then to Siberia.
