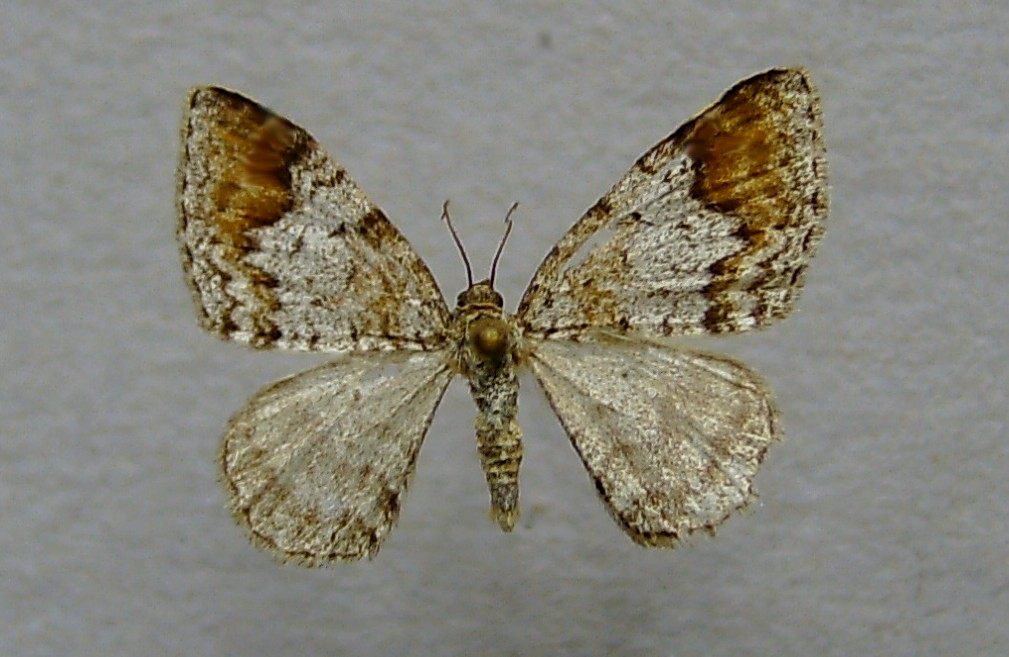

Scientific classification
- Domain: Eukaryota
- Kingdom: Animalia
- Phylum: Arthropoda
- Class: Insecta
- Order: Lepidoptera
- Family: Geometridae
- Genus: Venusia
- Species: V. blomeri

Binomial name
- Venusia blomeri (Curtis, 1832)

Synonyms
- Melanippe blomeri Curtis, 1832; Discoloxia blomeri; Discoloxia euchloe Bryk, 1949; Cidaria pulchraria Eversmann, 1842; Venusia szechuanensis Wehrli, 1931

= Blomer's rivulet =

Species of moth

Blomer's rivulet (Venusia blomeri) is a species of the family Geometridae of moths, in the subfamily Larentiinae which includes the carpet moth and pugs.

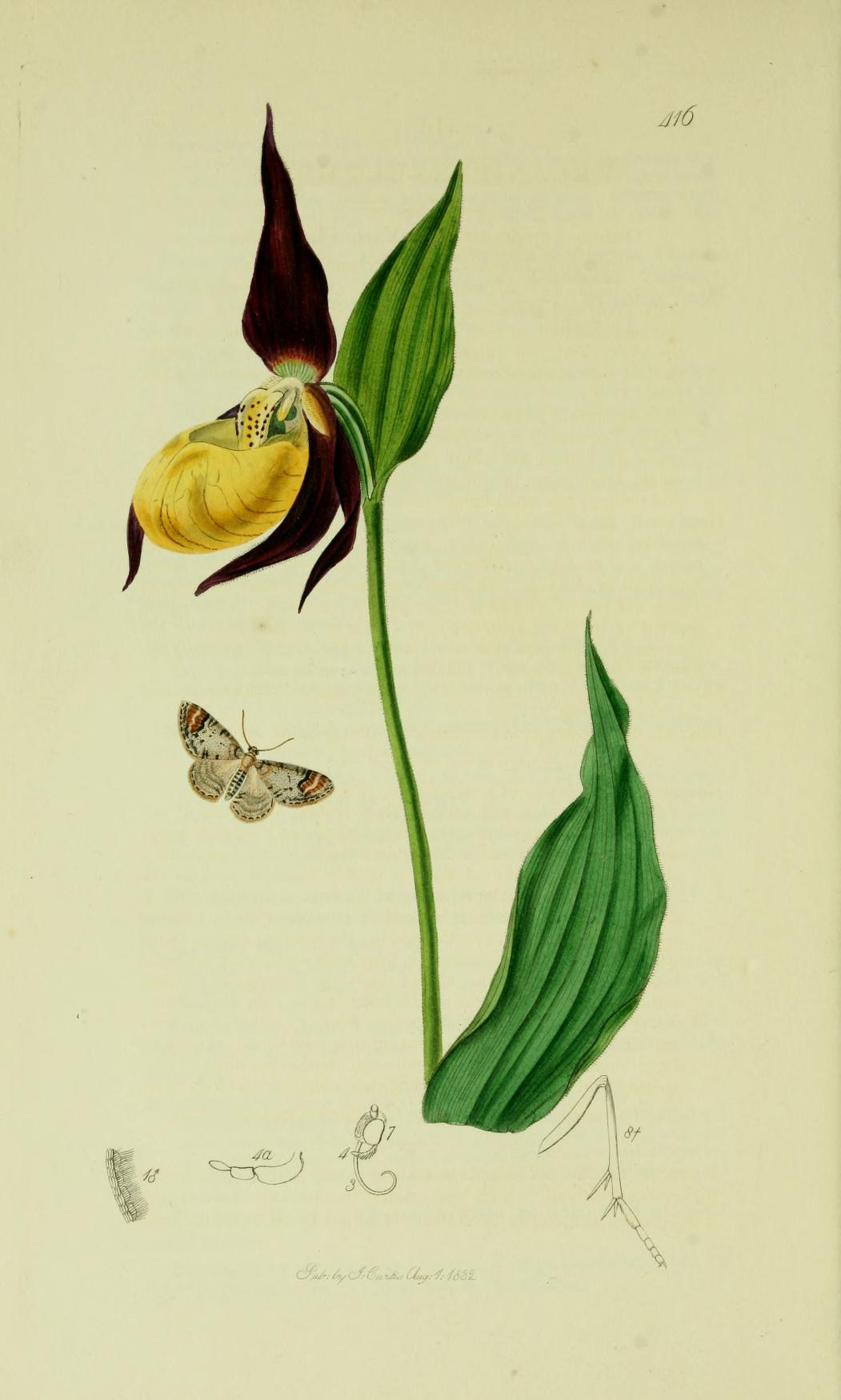
Illustration from John Curtis's British Entomology Volume 6

Like most geometers the moth rests with its wings open and this reveals its main distinguishing feature — a rusty-brown patch covering the apex of the upper surface of the forewing, which contrasts with the pale grey colour of the rest of the wings. When seen up close there are faint blackish cross lines too. The egg is yellow, small, angular, flat and has diamond-shaped depressions. The caterpillar is yellowish or light green coloured. The head, a thoracic segment and the penultimate segment are strikingly reddish-brown. The pupa has curved hooks on the cremaster.

The species has a large world range, occurring from France, Britain and Scandinavia through eastern Europe and Russia to China and Japan.

== Status in Britain ==
Blomer's rivulet is the only member of its genus found in Britain.

It is regarded by biodiversity conservation organisations as important from a conservation perspective, both in its own right due to its nationally scarce status but also as a representative of a group of moths which are specialised feeders on elm at the larval stage.

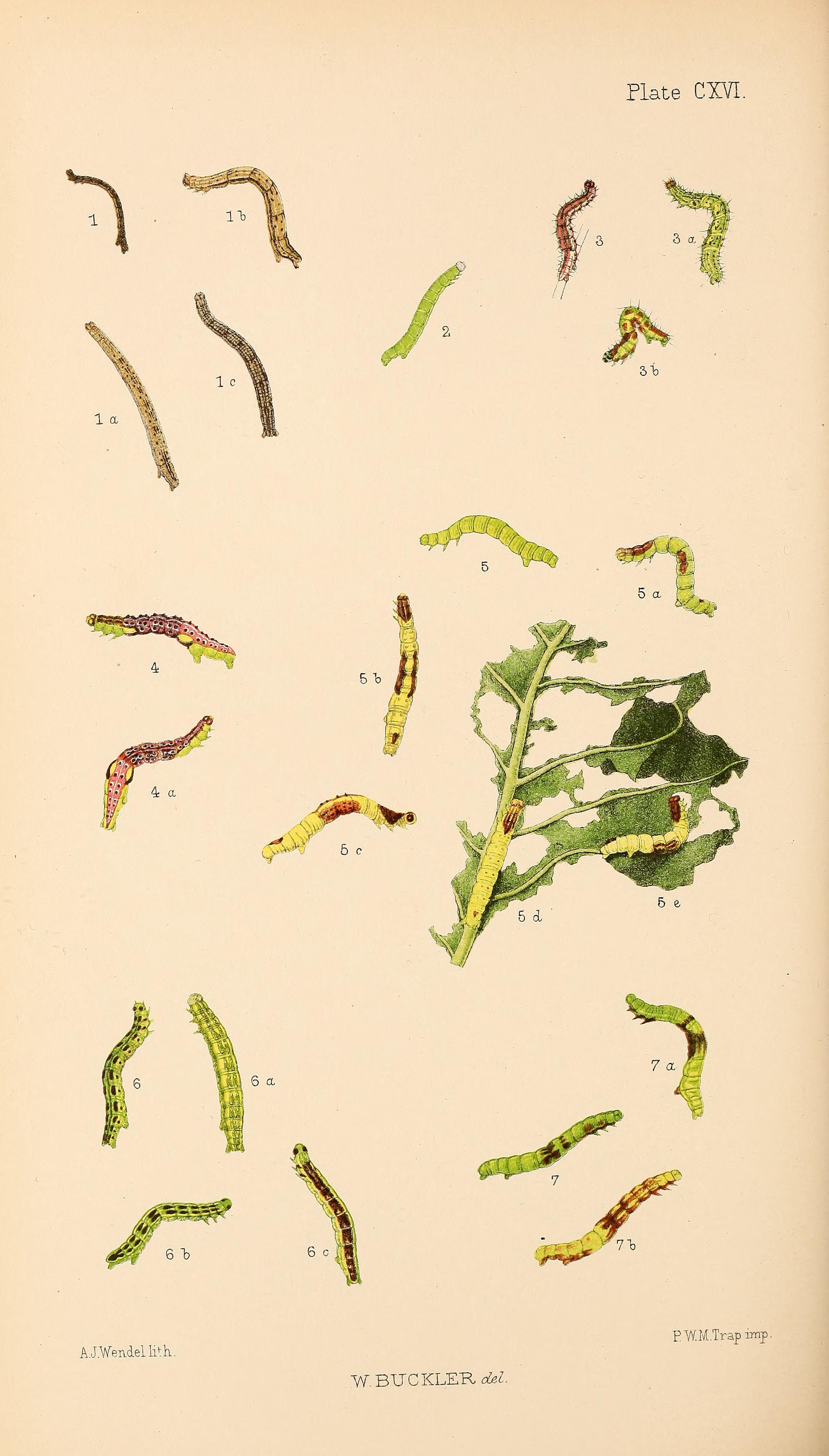
Fig 5,5a,5b,5c,5d,5e Larvae in various stages of growth

It occurs sporadically throughout Britain, mainly in broad-leaved or mixed woodland habitats, but also in hedgerows. The key habitat requirement is the presence of wych elm. Other macro-moths in the 'elm-feeding group' (i.e. moths whose caterpillars only feed on elm, as opposed to species which include elm in their diet alongside other trees) are the clouded magpie, the dusky-lemon sallow, and the lesser-spotted and white-spotted pinions – but whereas all of these species can feed on other species of elm (and some prefer other elms in fact), Blomer's rivulet appears to feed on wych elm only.

The distribution of Blomer's rivulet matches that of calcareous rocks, mainly in wetter parts of the country. The species' British distribution covers two main areas – it occurs from Devon through Somerset, Wiltshire and Bristol to South Wales and the south-west Midlands, and then again from Derbyshire and Nottinghamshire through Yorkshire to County Durham. The species is also found in the Chilterns, North Wales, Lincolnshire and Cumbria. However, despite having quite a wide geographical spread, the moth is afforded a status of Nationally Scarce (found in between 16 and 100 of Britain's 10 km squares). In Britain, the moth has a single generation per year – adults are on the wing from late May through to early July.

== Etymology ==
The species is named after Charles Blomer, who was born in 1778 or 1779 and died in 1835, and studied insects (principally in Southwest England and South Wales) during the 1820s and 1830s. He discovered the species in Britain (at Castle Eden Dene in County Durham) during this time and it was named after him in 1832.

== Subspecies ==
- Venusia blomeri blomeri (most of Europe, across Estonia, Latvia, Lithuania and Russia to Japan, northern and eastern China, North America)
- Venusia blomeri euchloe Bryk, 1949 (Korea)
- Venusia blomeri szechuanensis Wehrli, 1931 (south-western China)
