= Paulton Halt railway station =

Former railway station in England

Paulton Halt

General information
- Location: Paulton, Somerset; England
- Coordinates: 51.3171°N 2.4978°W
- Platforms: 1

Other information
- Status: Disused

History
- Original company: Great Western Railway

Key dates
- 1914: Opened
- 1915: Closed
- 1923: Reopened
- 1925: Closed
Location

Paulton Halt railway station was on the Camerton branch of the Great Western Railway in Somerset, England. It was in use from 1914 until 1925, however it was closed for 8½ of these 12 years due to World War I.

== History ==
The Bristol and North Somerset Railway (B&NSR) opened a branch line from Hallatrow to Camerton on 1 March 1882, although it had been funded by the Great Western Railway (GWR) which worked the trains on the line from the outset and purchased the B&NSR Company in 1884. The line was extended from Camerton to Limpley Stoke in 1910 where it made a connection with the GWR's Wilts, Somerset and Weymouth Line.

There was no station between Hallatrow and Camerton until Radford and Timsbury Halt was opened at the same time as the line was opened through to Limpley Stoke, and on 5 January 1914 Paulton Halt itself was opened. The term 'halt' was used by the GWR to denote railway stations without staff or goods facilities.

Passenger services had only been calling for a little over a year when, on 22 March 1915, they were withdrawn from the line due to the war. They were eventually restored on 9 July 1923, four and a half years after hostilities had ceased. They did not last long as they were withdrawn again on 21 September 1925, never to be resumed. Freight trains continued to operate through the station until 8 February 1932 and the track was lifted shortly afterwards.

== Description ==
The stone-built platform was situated on the north side of the line, 1.5 miles (2.4 km) from Hallatrow at a place known as Gossard's Bridge; the Cam Brook was on the south side of the line opposite the platform. It was 150 feet (46 m) long, 8 feet (2.4 m) wide and 3 feet (0.91 m) high. Three oil lamps were provided and a plan suggests that a shelter was intended, but no photographic evidence of it exists. Access was by a footpath from the Paulton to High Littleton road that crossed the line at the east end of the station on a bridge.

In 2010 a portion of the platform edge still stood, as did the access path and some railway fencing.

== Services ==
Passenger trains on the Hallatrow to Limpley Stoke line were operated by steam railmotors or, later, by auto trains. In 1914 there were five trains each day, Monday to Saturday only. In 1923 this had been reduced to just four.

Preceding station	Historical railways	Following station
Hallatrow	Great Western Railway; Camerton branch	Radford and Timsbury Halt
