= Paulton =

Village in Somerset, England

Coordinates: 51.3069°N 2.5027°W

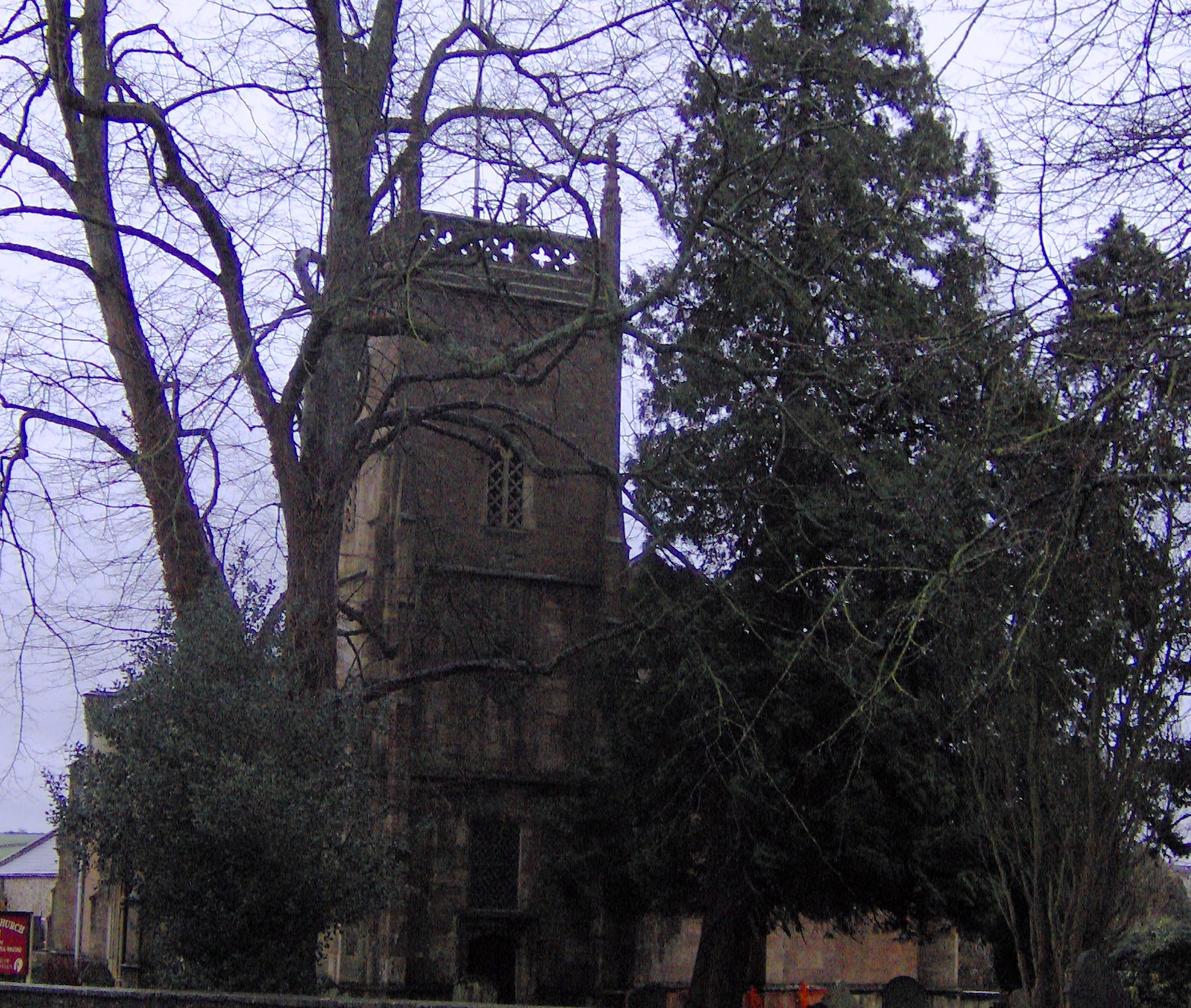
- Church of the Holy Trinity

- Location within Somerset
- Population: 5,303
- OS grid reference: ST650565
- Unitary authority: Bath and North East Somerset
- Ceremonial county: Somerset
- Region: South West
- Country: England
- Sovereign state: United Kingdom
- Post town: Bristol
- Postcode district: BS39
- Dialling code: 01761
- Police: Avon and Somerset
- Fire: Avon
- Ambulance: South Western
- UK Parliament: North East Somerset and Hanham

Paulton (English: /ˈpɔːltən/) is a large village and civil parish, with a population of 5,302, located to the north of the Mendip Hills, very close to Norton Radstock in the unitary authority of Bath and North East Somerset (BANES), England.

Paulton is a former coal mining village and the terminus of the Somerset Coal Canal is at Paulton basin, just north of the village. Paulton was home to the now-closed Polestar Purnells printing factory and Ashman's boot factory, where 'Voidax' safety footwear was manufactured, and in particular Motorcycle speedway boots. The area has been designated as an 'area of special architectural or historic interest, the character or appearance of which it is desirable to preserve or enhance' under section 69 of the Planning (Listed Buildings and Conservation Areas) Act 1990.

Paulton has a small hospital, doctors surgery, dentist, chemist, nursing home, library, public swimming pool, newsagent, travel agent, two convenience stores, a filling station, three takeaways, fire station, two pre-schools (Noahs Ark Preschool and Acorn Preschool), an infant school, and a junior school. The village is also served by a nearby supermarket.

There are two pubs in the village: The Red Lion and The Lamb.

A licensed bar and restaurant: La Campagna was previously a public house known as The Winterfield Inn (which closed in 2015).

Until the mid-1980s, there was also The Queen Victoria, but this was demolished to make way for flats, and The Somerset Inn which closed in 2011, with the adjoining paddock the subject of an unsuccessful planning application since, which would have seen it turned into a 22 home housing estate. There are also two members' clubs in the village, Paulton Rovers F.C. and Greyfield's Sports and Social club.

The centre of the village is the location for the war memorial and a small library. There is another war memorial just outside the village, to the southwest, which commemorates the location where 23 men were killed on 17 September 1944 when the glider they were flying in crashed en route from R.A.F. Keevil to Arnhem, as part of Operation Market Garden.

== History ==
The parish was part of the hundred of Chewton.

During the reign of Edward III the lord of the manor was Sir John de Palton and his descendants.

Hill House was built in around 1760 by John Hill (1729–1789) and was owned by his descendants until 1883 when it was leased to various tenants until 1902 when it was bought by Walter Draper. Draper sold it to Purnell's a local printing company, who owned it until 1971 when it was bought by the local doctor and refurbished. It is a Grade II listed building.

John Hill was an innkeeper, and his son Thomas Ames Hill (1759–1827) owned the Red Lion pub. By 1834 his nephew John Hill jnr. had taken over the pub, and was living there with his family.

=== Coal mining ===
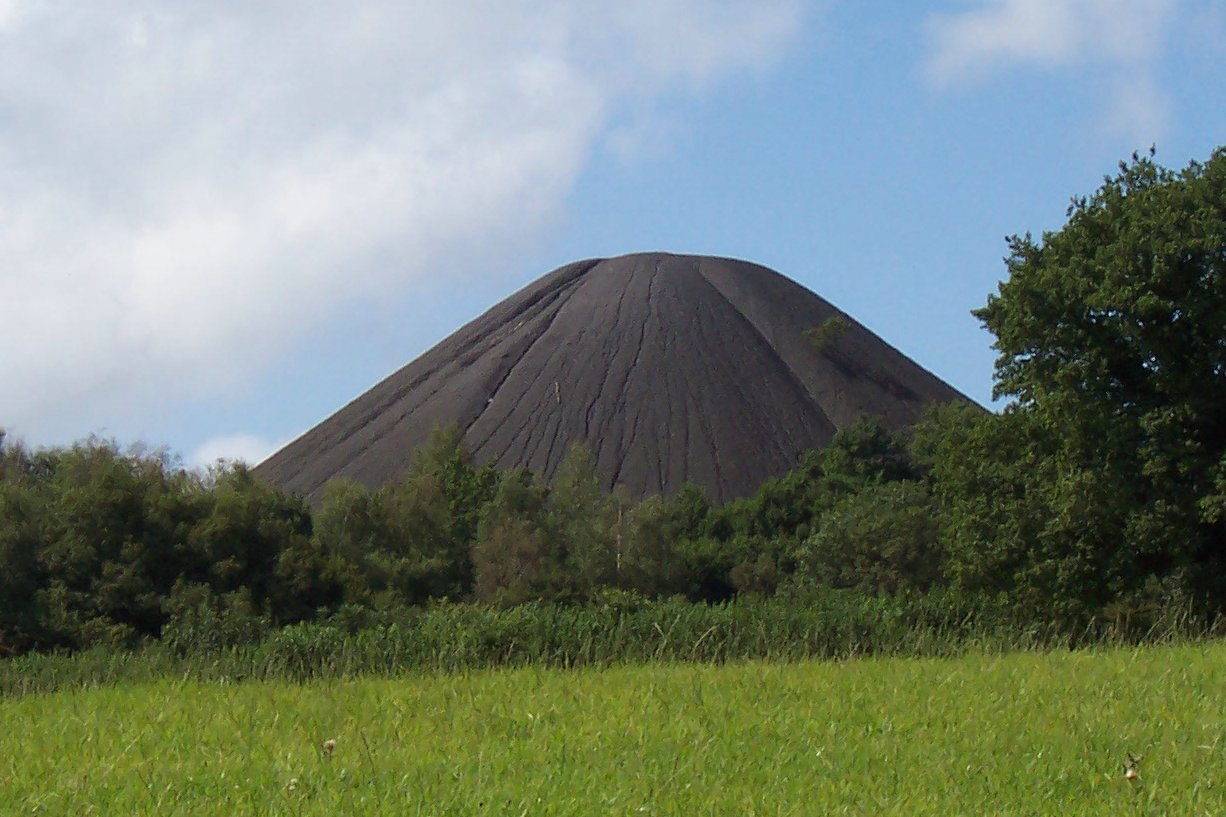
'The Batch'

Much evidence of coal mining on the Somerset Coalfield still exists in and around the village, including a spoil tip known as "The Batch".

Paulton basin is the terminus of the northern branch of the Somerset Coal Canal and was a central point for at least 15 collieries around Paulton, Timsbury and High Littleton, which were connected to the canal by tramroads. It was served by two small railways stations: Paulton Radford and Timsbury Halt and Paulton Halt on the Camerton Branch of the Bristol and North Somerset Railway. Although the canal has been derelict since the end of the 19th century, a restoration project began in 2013 and there are plans to re-open the entire length from Paulton to Limpley Stoke, where the first quarter-mile of the canal was restored in the 1980s and is now a busy marina. The deepest mine of its time, at 1,800 feet (550 m), was at Timsbury; the largest drydock on the canal system in the country is on the east side of Paulton basin, and the canal carried record tonnages of coal during the 1820s and 1830s. This canal carried the coal that fueled the Georgian development of Bath during most of the nineteenth century.

On the northern side of Paulton basin was the terminus for the tramroad which served Old Grove, Prior's, Tyning and Hayeswood pits, with a branch line to Amesbury and Mearns pits. Parts of this line were still in use in 1873, probably carrying horse-drawn wagons of coal. The southern side of the basin served Brittens, Littleborrok, Paulton Ham, Paulton Hill and Simons Hill, terminating at Salisbury Colliery. In addition the Paulton Foundry used this line. The entire line was disused by 1871, as were the collieries it served.

=== Modern industry ===
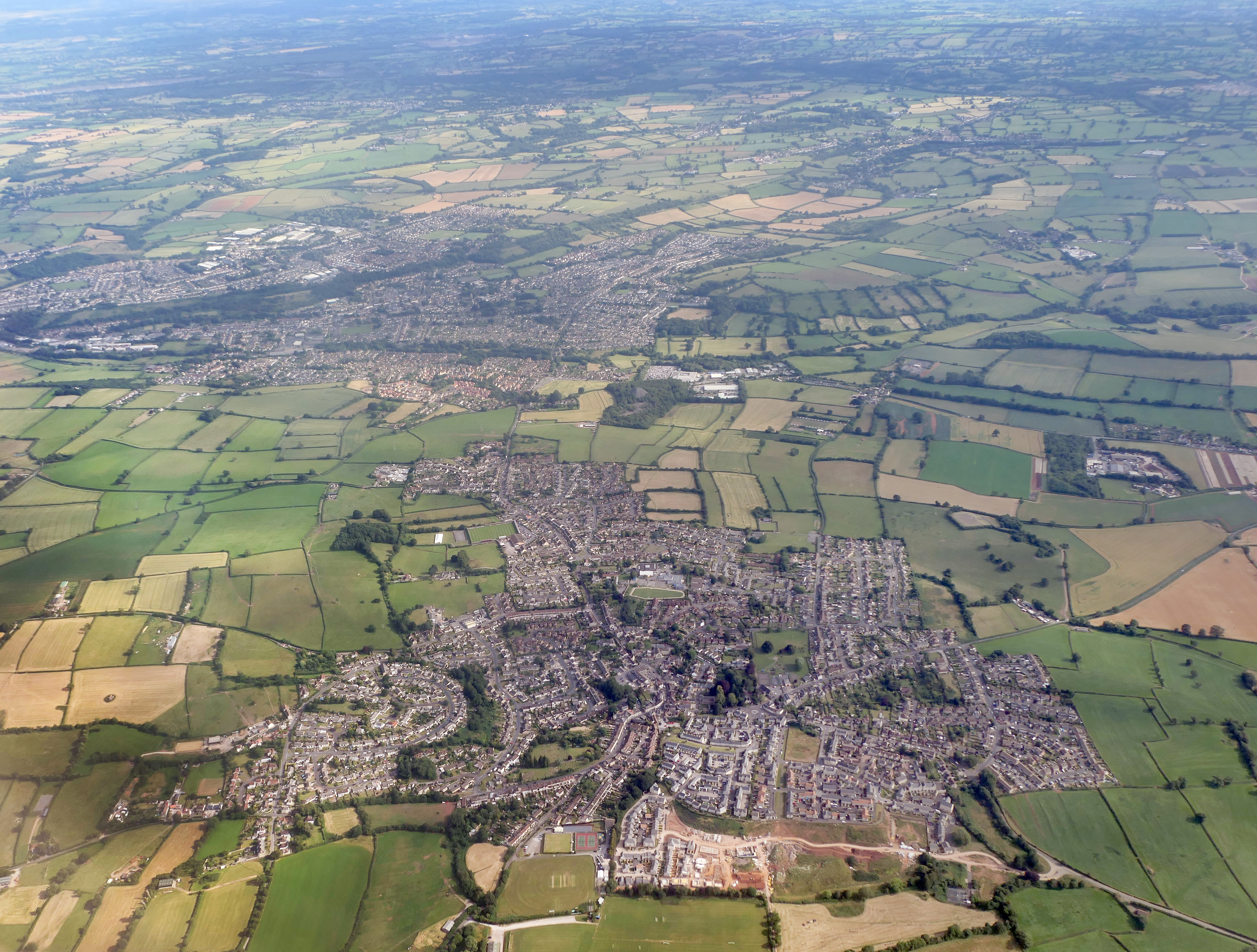
Aerial view of Paulton, with Midsomer Norton in the distance.

Paulton was the location of the first Great Mills DIY store, and the company's head office was located adjacent to the store. It used to be called Old Mills DIY, by virtue of the fact that the store was sited on the former Old Mills colliery baths site. The Great Mills business was acquired by Focus DIY Ltd in 2000, and all of the stores were rebranded. This site has since been taken over by Wickes.

Tesco is a major employer in the village. Although this large store is described as being in Midsomer Norton it lies within Paulton's parish boundaries.

=== Housing ===
In 2009–2015 the Purnells factory was replaced with 420 houses.

== Governance ==
Paulton has its own parish council, formed in 1894. This body maintains the following amenities in the parish: the cemetery, Memorial Park, Miners Welfare Recreation Ground, Wallenge Open Space, Noah's Ark Pre-school, nine allotments and the war memorial. The council is also responsible for the public convenience in the Red Lion car park which is leased from B&NES. The leases for the village hall and the swimming pool are held by the parish council. These amenities are looked after by independent management committees with the parish council funding major capital works to the buildings.

Paulton is represented on the Bath and North East Somerset Council by two Labour Councillors, Liz Hardman and Grant Johnson. The unitary authority of Bath and North East Somerset was created in 1996, as established by the Local Government Act 1972. It provides a single tier of local government with responsibility for almost all local government functions within its area including local planning and building control, local roads, council housing, environmental health, markets and fairs, refuse collection, recycling, cemeteries, crematoria, leisure services, parks, and tourism. It is also responsible for education, social services, libraries, main roads, public transport, Trading Standards, waste disposal and strategic planning, although fire, police and ambulance services are provided jointly with other authorities through the Avon Fire and Rescue Service, Avon and Somerset Constabulary and the Great Western Ambulance Service.

Bath and North East Somerset's area covers part of the ceremonial county of Somerset but it is administered independently of the non-metropolitan county. Its administrative headquarters are in Bath. Between 1 April 1974 and 1 April 1996, it was the Wansdyke district and the City of Bath of the county of Avon. Before 1974, the parish was part of the Clutton Rural District.

The parish is represented in the House of Commons of the Parliament of the United Kingdom as part of the North East Somerset and Hanham constituency. It elects one Member of Parliament (MP) by the first past the post system of election.

== Religious sites ==
The five churches include the Methodist Church, dated 1894, Baptist Church (1724) and Church of the Holy Trinity, dated 1757 and 1839, the latter by John Pinch the younger, which includes a cholera monument, from the early to mid 19th century and several other monuments in the churchyard. The Anglican Church of the Trinity is located in the parish of Paulton and Diocese of Bath and Wells. It is a Grade II* listed building. Paulton is currently serving as part of the 10 lamps ministry group and is part of the benefice with St John's, Farrington Gurney and Holy Trinity, High Littleton.

== Sports ==
Paulton Rovers F.C. play in the Southern Football League Premier Division League having been promoted by winning the Division One South & West play off final 2–0 at previously unbeaten Merthyr Town with Nick McCootie scoring both goals.

Purnell Cricket Club provides the village with a well-established cricket club. They run youth teams for school aged children of all abilities and currently enter 2 senior teams in league cricket on Saturdays throughout the summer. Further sports facilities are present on the same complex as the cricket club, with tennis courts, bowls, a gym and a football pitch home to Purnells Sports F.C.

Paulton also has a public swimming pool/club.

== Notable people from Paulton ==
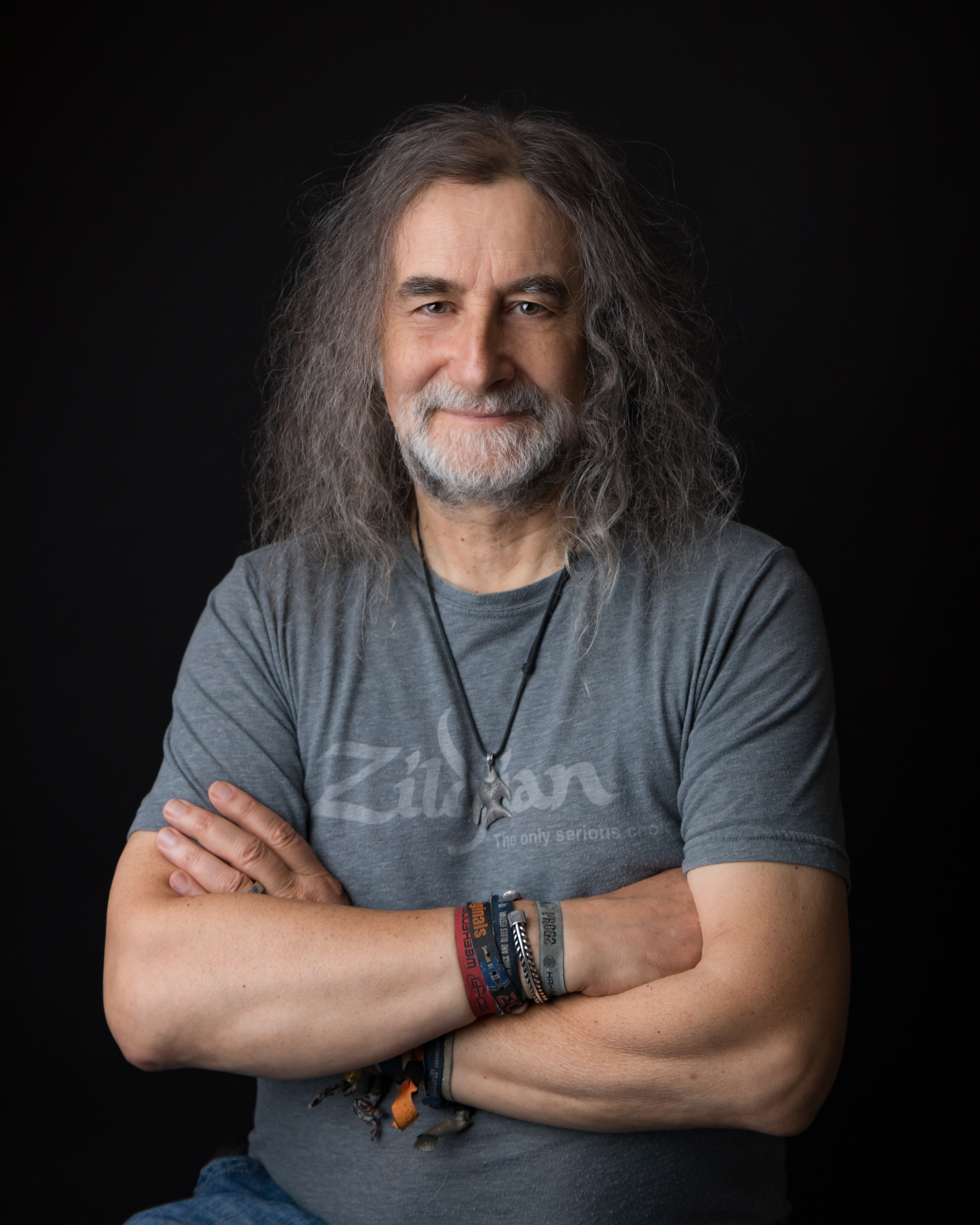
Rodney Matthews, 2016

- Oliver Brooks (1889−1940), sergeant in the Coldstream Guards, recipient of the Victoria Cross
- Rodney Matthews (born 1945), fantasy artist and illustrator
- Martin Roberts (born 1963), TV presenter, property expert, investor, entrepreneur and author.
- Dee Ferris (born 1973), painter

=== Sport ===
- Laurie Banfield (1889–1979), footballer who played 259 games for Bristol City
- Clarrie Bourton (1908–1981), footballer and football manager, played 360 games
- Don Rogers (born 1945), footballer, played 500 games including 400 for Swindon Town
- Danny Bartley (born 1947), footballer, played 413 games
- Julian Wyatt (born 1963), cricketer who played 69 First-class cricket games for Somerset
- Jason Matthews (born 1975), footballer, played over 370 games.
- Aaron Kuhl (born 1996), footballer, who played over 175 games.
- Josh Barrett (born 1998), footballer who has played about 200 games.
