= Radstock railway station =

Radstock railway station may refer to two former railway stations in Radstock, Somerset.

- Radstock North railway station
- Radstock West railway station
