= Stephen's Vale Nature Reserve =

Nature reserve in Somerset, England

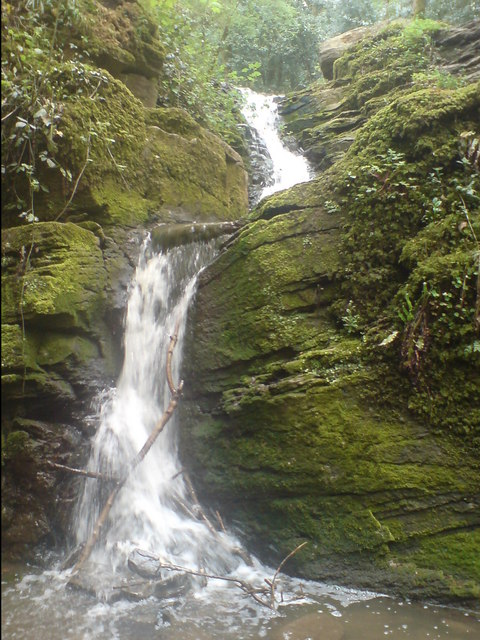
- Waterfall in Stephen's Vale Nature Reserve

- Location within England
- Nearest town: High Littleton
- Coordinates: 51°19′07″N 02°31′21″W
- Area: 1.5 acres (0.61 ha)
- Operator: Avon Wildlife Trust

Stephen's Vale Nature Reserve is located in a small wooded valley south of Greyfield Wood and west of High Littleton in Somerset, England. It is known for its two-stage, 15 foot high waterfall, which is on a tributary of Cam Brook.

== History ==
Stephen's Vale Nature Reserve was once part of the Earl of Warwick's hunting estate.

== In popular culture ==
The waterfall at Stephen's Vale Nature Reserve, and the nearby Greyfield Wood were used as locations for filming the British television series Robin of Sherwood.
