= Church of the Holy Trinity, Paulton =

Church in Somerset, England

Church of the Holy Trinity
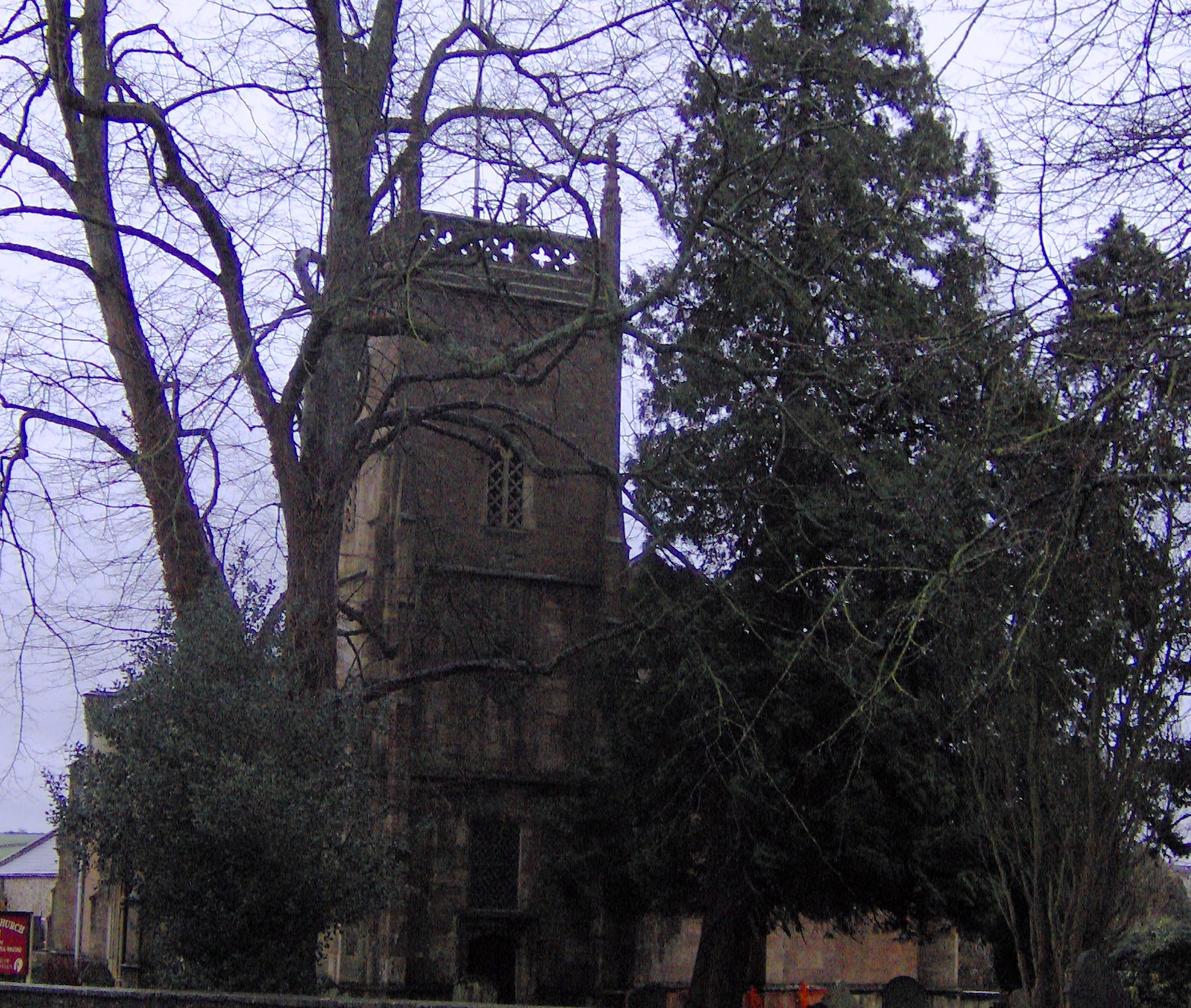

- Location within Somerset
- 51°18′27″N 2°30′15″W
- Location: Paulton, Somerset, England

Listed Building – Grade II*
- Official name: Church of the Holy Trinity
- Designated: 21 September 1960
- Reference no.: 1320745

The Anglican Church of the Holy Trinity in Paulton, Somerset, England, was founded in 1235 and is a Grade II* listed building. It was built on the site of an earlier church. The Church of the Trinity is located in the parish of Paulton and Diocese of Bath and Wells, having previously been a chapel attached to the Church of St Mary Magdalene in Chewton Mendip until 1841. Paulton is currently serving as part of the 10 lamps ministry group and is part of the benefice with St John's, Farrington Gurney, and Holy Trinity, High Littleton.

The church was rebuilt in 1757 and restored in 1839 by John Pinch, to cope with the growing population working on the Somerset coalfield. The chancel and organ chamber were added in 1864. Two stone effigies which are believed to be of members of the Palton family after which the village is named.

The three-stage square tower was built in the reign of Edward III and stands at the west end of north aisle of church. It was refaced in 1757 with stone from the Doulting Stone Quarry. The bells were recast by the Bilbie family in 1742 and a sixth bell was added in 1897 to commemorate the sixtieth anniversary of Queen Victoria. The clock was added in 1872.

The churchyard includes a cholera monument, to 23 men, 23 women and 26 children who died in a cholera outbreak in 1832 and 14 men, 14 women and 34 children from a second outbreak between 1844 and 1850. There are several other monuments in the churchyard.

== See also ==
- List of ecclesiastical parishes in the Diocese of Bath and Wells
