= Midford Halt railway station =

Railway station in Somerset, England

Coordinates: 51.3456°N 2.3426°W

Midford Halt
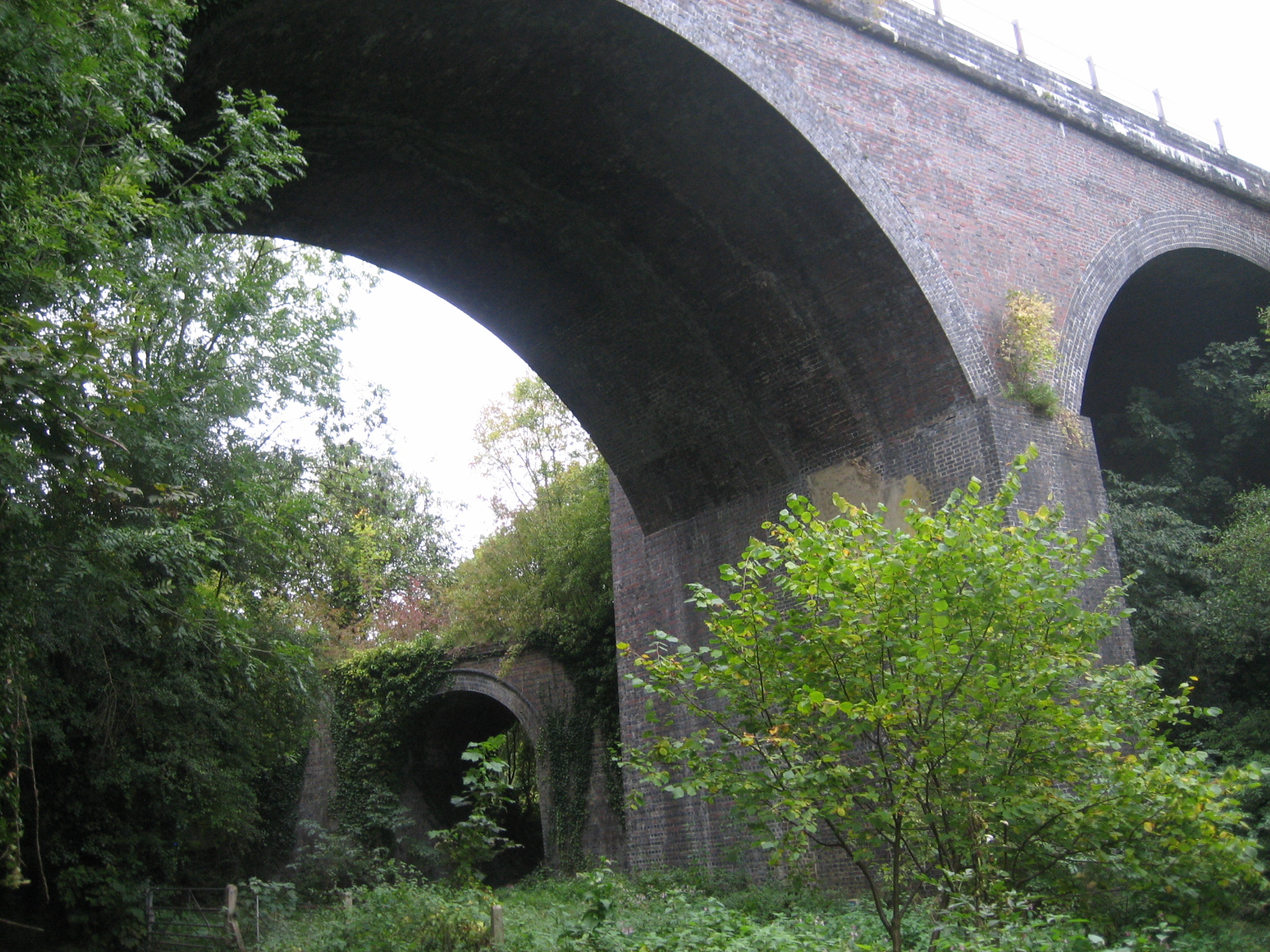
- East-west beneath north-south: Camerton branch viaduct (left) dwarfed by Somerset and Dorset Joint Railway viaduct at Midford

General information
- Location: Midford, Somerset; England
- Platforms: 1

Other information
- Status: Disused

History
- Original company: Great Western Railway
- Pre-grouping: Great Western Railway

Key dates
- 27 Feb 1911: Opened
- 22 Mar 1915: Closed
Location

Midford Halt railway station was open between 1911 and 1915 in Somerset, England. The halt was on the Limpley Stoke to Camerton railway that formed part of the Great Western Railway's development of the former Bristol and North Somerset Railway, and which followed the former Somerset Coal Canal. The line was only open to passenger traffic for seven years in all, from 1910 to 1915, and from 1923 to 1925; Midford Halt opened a year late and then did not reopen for the second period.

Midford Halt was in Wiltshire; the county boundary runs up to the B3110 road at the point where the canal and railway crossed the road, and the halt was on the Wiltshire side.

The halt was about 400 metres northeast of Midford station which was on the Somerset and Dorset Joint Railway line.

Preceding station	Disused railways	Following station
Combe Hay Halt; Line and station closed	Bristol and North Somerset Railway; Great Western Railway	Monkton Combe Halt; Line and station closed
