= Radford and Timsbury Halt railway station =

Former railway station in England

Radford and Timsbury Halt

General information
- Location: Radford, Somerset; England
- Coordinates: 51.3188°N 2.4709°W
- Platforms: 1

Other information
- Status: Disused

History
- Original company: Great Western Railway

Key dates
- 1910: Opened
- 1915: Closed
- 1923: Reopened
- 1925: Closed
Location

Radford and Timsbury Halt railway station was on the Camerton branch of the Great Western Railway in Somerset, England. It was in use from 1910 until 1915, and again from 1923 until 1925.

== History ==
The Bristol and North Somerset Railway (B&NSR) opened a branch line from Hallatrow to Camerton on 1 March 1882, although it had been funded by the Great Western Railway (GWR) which worked the trains on the line from the outset and purchased the B&NSR Company in 1884. The line was extended from Camerton to Limpley Stoke in 1910 where it made a connection with the GWR's Wilts, Somerset and Weymouth Line.

When the line opened were no stations between Hallatrow and Camerton. In 1899 the Timsbury Colliery Company signed an agreement with the GWR for a siding at Radford. The GWR siding was opened for traffic on 19 July 1900 and the line connecting it to the colliery came into use in October that year. Radford and Timsbury Halt opened for passenger trains on 9 May 1910, the same day as the line was extended through to Limpley Stoke. The term 'halt' was used by the GWR to denote railway stations without staff or public goods facilities.

Passenger services on the line were withdrawn on 22 March 1915 due to World War I. They were eventually restored on 9 July 1923, four and a half years after hostilities had ceased. They did not last long as they were withdrawn again on 21 September 1925, never to be resumed. Freight trains continued to operate until 8 February 1932 and the track was lifted shortly afterwards.

== Description ==
The station was 2.85 miles (4.59 km) from Hallatrow and just 0.58 miles (0.93 km) from Camerton. The timber-built platform was situated on the south side of the line. It was 150 feet (46 m) long, 8 feet (2.4 m) wide, and provided with oil lamps and a corrugated iron shelter. Access was by a footpath from the road bridge that crossed the line at the east end of the station.

No public goods facilities were provided, but a loop siding on the north side of the line immediately to the west of the passenger platform was connected at its east end to a 300 yards (270 m) cable-worked incline up to the colliery. Loaded wagons coming down provided the power to haul empties back up to the colliery.

== Services ==
Passenger trains on the Hallatrow to Limpley Stoke line were operated by steam railmotors or, later, by auto trains. In 1914 there were five trains each day, Monday to Saturday only. In 1923 this had been reduced to four.

Preceding station	Historical railways	Following station
Paulton Halt	Great Western Railway; Camerton branch	Camerton (Somerset)
