= Dunkerton railway station =

Disused railway station in Dunkerton, Somerset

Dunkerton

General information
- Location: Dunkerton, Somerset; England
- Coordinates: 51.3293°N 2.432°W
- Grid reference: ST700590
- Platforms: 1

Other information
- Status: Disused

History
- Original company: Great Western Railway

Key dates
- 9 May 1910: Opened (first occasion)
- 22 March 1915: Closed to passengers as a wartime economy measure
- 1 April 1918: Closed to goods traffic
- 9 July 1923: Reopened to passengers
- 21 September 1925: Closed
Location

Dunkerton railway station served the village of Dunkerton, Somerset, England from 1910 to 1925. It was constructed as part of the extension of the original Bristol and North Somerset Railway Camerton branch line, carried out by the Great Western Railway between 1906 and 1910. This created a new railway which ran eastwards from the former terminus at Camerton through Dunkerton, Combe Hay, Midford and Monkton Combe before connecting to the Great Western Railway main line at Limpley Stoke.

== History ==
The station opened on 9 May 1910 by the Great Western Railway. The station was closed to passenger traffic on 22 March 1915 as a war-time economy measure, and to goods traffic on 1 April 1918 along with the station signal box. However the station and signal box were re-opened on 9 July 1923 to both passenger and goods traffic - the resumption of activity lasted a little over two years, and the closure of the signal box on 21 September 1925 marked the final closure of the station itself.

Preceding station	Disused railways	Following station
Dunkerton Colliery Halt; Line and station closed	Great Western Railway; Bristol and North Somerset Railway	Combe Hay Halt; Line and station closed
