= Dunkerton Colliery Halt railway station =

Disused railway station in Dunkerton, Somerset

Dunkerton Colliery Halt

General information
- Location: Dunkerton, Somerset; England
- Coordinates: 51.3255°N 2.4409°W
- Grid reference: ST817437
- Platforms: 1

Other information
- Status: Disused

History
- Original company: Great Western Railway

Key dates
- 9 October 1911: Opened
- 22 March 1915: Closed temporarily
- 9 July 1923: Reopened
- 21 September 1925: Closed permanently
Location

Dunkerton Colliery Halt railway station served the colliery near the village of Dunkerton, Somerset, England, from 1911 to 1925 on the Bristol and North Somerset Railway.

== History ==
The station opened on 9 October 1911 by the Great Western Railway, around a year after the line and the main stations had been opened. It was, from the outset, a basic, unstaffed halt intended to serve the villages of Tunley and Carlingcott as well as workers at the colliery itself. The station first closed to passengers on 22 March 1915, reopened on 9 July 1923, and closed again on 21 September 1925 to both passenger and goods traffic.

Preceding station	Disused railways	Following station
Camerton; Line and station closed	Great Western Railway; Bristol and North Somerset Railway	Dunkerton; Line and station closed
