= Julian Wyatt =

English cricketer (born 1963)

Personal information
- Full name: Julian George Wyatt
- Born: 19 June 1963 (age 63); Paulton, Somerset, England
- Batting: Right-handed
- Bowling: Right-arm medium
- Role: Batsman

Domestic team information
- Years: Team
- 1983–1989: Somerset
- FC debut: 2 July 1983 Somerset v New Zealanders
- Last FC: 28 July 1989 Somerset v Sussex
- LA debut: 4 July 1984 Somerset v Hertfordshire
- Last LA: 27 June 1995 Devon v Sussex

Career statistics
Competition	First-class	List A
Matches	69	46
Runs scored	2,789	747
Batting average	25.35	18.21
100s/50s	3/12	0/5
Top score	145	89
Balls bowled	138	42
Wickets	3	1
Bowling average	32.33	55.00
5 wickets in innings	0	0
10 wickets in match	0	0
Best bowling	1/0	1/25
Catches/stumpings	27/–	17/–
- Source: CricketArchive, 2 July 2010

Julian George Wyatt (born 19 June 1963) is a former cricketer who played first-class and List A cricket for Somerset County Cricket Club between 1983 and 1989. Wyatt was born in 1963 at Paulton, Somerset and educated at Wells Cathedral School.

== First-class career ==
Wyatt was a right-handed batsman often used as opening batsman. His upright and technically correct batting style meant that he was used more frequently in first-class cricket than in shorter forms of the game, and though he played often for Somerset in his seven seasons, he was never assured of his place in the side in all forms of the game.

Wyatt made his first-class debut in a mid-season match in 1983 against the New Zealanders, and then returned as an opener in the final five games of the season. In these matches he scored three half-centuries, including 69 and an unbeaten 82 in the final game of the season against Warwickshire. Wisden in its review of Somerset's season wrote that Wyatt "displayed a splendid temperament and a sound technique".

In 1984, Wyatt started in good form, scoring 87 in the first innings of the first game of the season against Yorkshire and putting on 246 for the first wicket with Peter Roebuck. In the next match, against Oxford University, he pair put on 181 and Wyatt went on to a first century, scoring 103. Then, in the fourth match of the season, against the West Indians, he made 45 out of Somerset's 116 in the first innings and 69 of the total of 125 in the second. But his form declined and he was left out of the team for several matches from mid-season onwards. Wisden noted that he "rather faded as off-side technical defects were discovered".

In terms of figures, the 1985 season was Wyatt's best: he scored 816 runs at an average of 31.38. Again, he started the season with a big innings against Oxford University: he made 145 out of a first-wicket partnership of 245 with Roebuck, and this would be the highest first-class score of his career. He missed a month of cricket with a hand injury, but regained his place mid-season and in the match against Hampshire, batting at No 4, he made his first and only County Championship century, an innings of exactly 100 that occupied six hours and 22 minutes but helped Somerset to save the match. He played fairly regularly in Somerset's List A side in 1985, but was notably unsuccessful, recording only 61 runs in nine completed innings.

The 1986 and 1987 seasons were poor ones for Wyatt, but he returned to more regular first-team cricket in 1988 and had his most successful season in List A matches, scoring 368 runs at an average of 30.66. These runs included four scores of 50 or more, including 89, his highest one-day innings, made in a high-scoring Sunday League matchy against Yorkshire at Scarborough. That was higher than he achieved in 15 first-class matches, where there was a return of 578 runs and an average of 23.13. After an unproductive 1989 season with few matches in either format of the game, Wyatt left the Somerset staff.

== After first-class cricket ==
Wyatt played Minor Counties cricket for three seasons for Devon from 1993 to 1995, appearing in each season in a first-round match in the NatWest Trophy against first-class opposition, But neither he nor his team was successful in these matches. He also went back to Somerset as the county club's schools coach.
