= Combe Hay Halt railway station =

Disused railway station in Combe Hay, Somerset

Combe Hay Halt

General information
- Location: Combe Hay, Somerset; England
- Coordinates: 51.3384°N 2.389°W
- Grid reference: ST730600
- Platforms: 1

Other information
- Status: Disused

History
- Original company: Great Western Railway

Key dates
- 9 May 1910: Opened
- 22 March 1915: Closed to passengers due to the First World War
- 9 July 1923: Reopened
- 21 September 1925: Closed
Location

Combe Hay Halt railway station was a railway station that served the village of Combe Hay, Somerset, England from 1910 to 1925 on the Bristol and North Somerset Railway.

== History ==
The station was opened on 9 May 1910 by the Great Western Railway. It closed to passengers on 22 March 1915 as a wartime economy measure but reopened on 9 July 1923, only to close again to both passengers and goods traffic on 21 September 1925.

| Preceding station | Disused railways | Following station |
|---|---|---|
| Dunkerton; Line and station closed | Great Western Railway; Bristol and North Somerset Railway | Midford Halt; Line and station closed |
