= Laurie Banfield =

English footballer (1889–1979)

Personal information
- Date of birth: 11 November 1889
- Place of birth: Paulton, Somerset, England
- Date of death: 11 September 1979 (aged 89)
- Place of death: Paulton, Somerset, England
- Height: 5 ft 7 in (1.70 m)
- Position: Left back

Youth career
- Old Mills

Senior career*
Years	Team	Apps	(Gls)
- Paulton Rovers
1911–1925	Bristol City	259	(6)
- Ilfracombe Town

Managerial career
- Ilfracombe Town (player/manager)
- * Club domestic league appearances and goals

Laurence Banfield (11 November 1889 – 11 September 1979) was an English footballer who played as a left back. He made over 250 Football League appearances in the years before and after the First World War.

== Career ==
Laurie Banfield played locally for Old Mills and Paulton Rovers. Sam Hollis signed Banfield in July 1911 from Paulton Rovers for Bristol City.

== Personal life ==
Banfield served in the British Armed Forces during the First World War.

== Honours ==
with Bristol City

- Football League Third Division South winner: 1922–23
- FA Cup semi-finalist 1920
