= Midsomer Norton and Welton railway station =

Former railway station in England

Coordinates: 51.2921°N 2.4782°W

Midsomer Norton and Welton
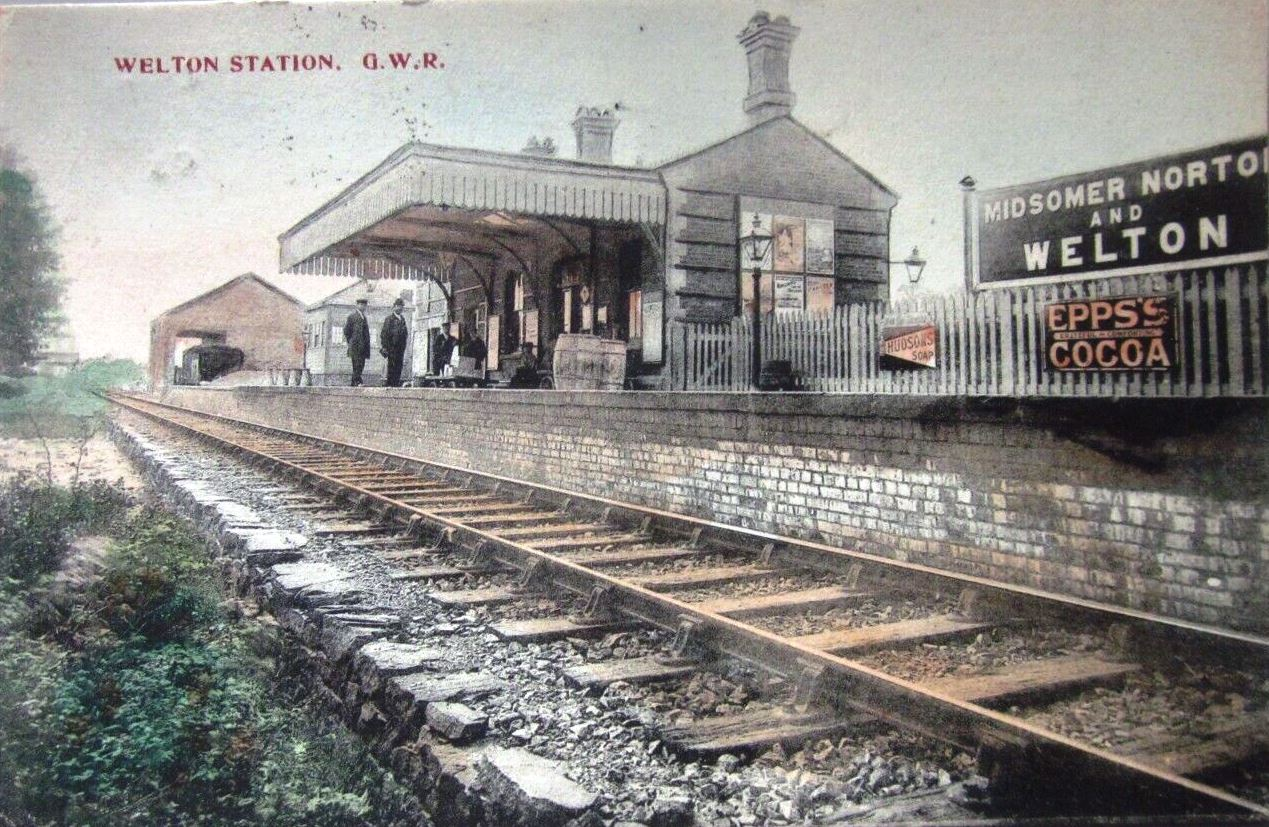

General information
- Location: England
- Platforms: 1

Other information
- Status: Disused

History
- Original company: Bristol and North Somerset Railway
- Post-grouping: Great Western Railway

Key dates
- 3 September 1873: Opened as Welton
- 2 May 1898: Renamed Welton and Midsomer Norton
- 1 May 1904: renamed Midsomer Norton and Welton
- 2 November 1959: Closed for passengers
- 15 June 1964: closed for goods
Location

Midsomer Norton and Welton was a station on the Great Western Railway line from Bristol to Frome via Radstock (originally the Bristol and North Somerset Railway). The station was originally named just Welton, being located in a valley at the village of Welton, Somerset. It closed to passengers in 1959 with the closure of the line to passenger traffic, and to goods in 1964.

Midsomer Norton was also served by a second station on the Somerset and Dorset Joint Railway.

Preceding station	Historical railways	Following station
Farrington Gurney Halt	Great Western Railway	Radstock West
