= Camerton railway station (Somerset) =

Disused railway station in Camerton, Somerset

Camerton (Somerset)
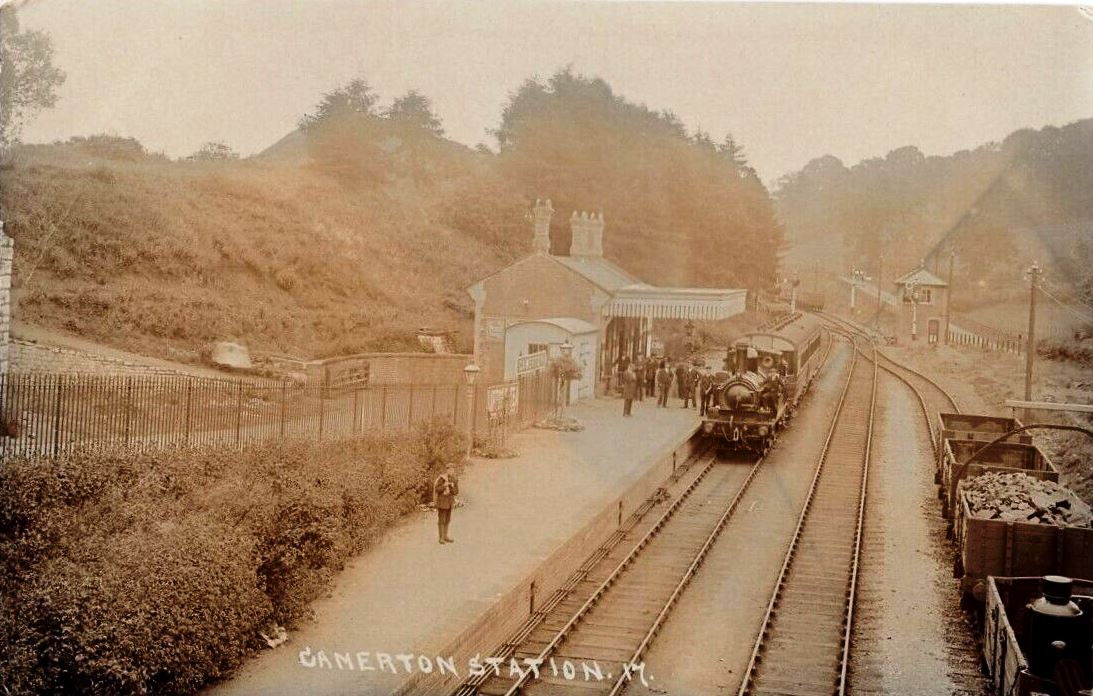

General information
- Location: Camerton, Somerset; England
- Coordinates: 51.319082°N 2.458108°W
- Grid reference: ST681578
- Platforms: 1

Other information
- Status: Disused

History
- Original company: Great Western Railway

Key dates
- 1 March 1882: Opened
- 22 March 1915: Station closed to passengers
- 9 July 1923: Station reopened to passengers
- 21 September 1925: Station closed again to passengers
- 15 February 1951: Station closed to goods
Location

Camerton (Somerset) railway station served the village of Camerton, England from 1882 to 1951 on the Bristol and North Somerset Railway. In common with the other stations on the line it had a single platform for passengers, but also had a loop line so that two trains could pass. Diverging away from the through line at the east end of the station was the access line and associated sidings belonging to Camerton colliery. There was a substantial station building on the platform - this originally had a canopy but this was removed after passenger services ceased.

== History ==
The station opened on 1 March 1882 by the Great Western Railway. The station firstly closed for passengers on 22 March 1915, then reopened on 9 February 1923. It closed to passengers once more on 21 September 1925. It had an unusual history in that it was originally the terminus of a branch from the west (from Hallatrow), was then the main station on a through route when the branch was extended eastwards to Limpley Stoke, and was finally the terminus of a branch from the east after the section westward to Hallatrow was closed in 1932 .

Preceding station	Disused railways	Following station
Radford and Timsbury Halt; Line and station closed	Great Western Railway; Bristol and North Somerset Railway	Dunkerton Colliery Halt; Line and station closed
