= Dee Ferris =

British painter

Dee Ferris (born 1973 in Paulton, Somerset), is a British painter. She studied at Christ's College, Cambridge, and the Royal College of Art.

Ferris has participated in group exhibitions at Saatchi Gallery, London; Taka Ishii Gallery, Tokyo; Tate Britain, London; City Gallery Prague, Prague; Prague Biennale, Prague; Andrea Rosen Gallery, New York; and the Royal Academy. She has had solo shows at Taro Nasu Gallery, Tokyo and Corvi-Mora, London.

Her works are held in the UBS art collection in London and the Saatchi Gallery.

== Selected bibliography ==
- Martin Coomer, "Ein Ding Schönheit ist ein Glück auf immer", Time Out, November 23–30, p. 44 (2005)
- Roy Exley, "Dee Ferris", Flash Art, November - December, p. 72 (2004)
- JJ Charlesworth, "Fever", Flash Art, November - December, pp. 84–87 (2004)
- Matt Price, "Mixed Paint", Flash Art, November - December, p. 91 (2004)
- Dan Smith, "Dee Ferris", Art Review, November, p. 143 (2004)
- JJ Charlesworth, "on art's permissive society", Modern Painters, Autumn, pp. 74–76 (2004)
- JJ Charlesworth, "I Want! I Want!", Art Monthly, October, pp. 33–35 (2003)
- Rose Aidin, "Dogs and Doigs", Art News, Summer, p. 128 (2003)
- Michael Wilson, "Exploring Landscape: Eight Views from Britain", Art Monthly, March, pp. 32–34 (2003)
- Martha Schwendener, "Critics Picks", Artforum, February (2003)
