= Whitchurch Halt railway station =

Disused railway station in Whitchurch, Somerset

Whitchurch Halt

General information
- Location: Whitchurch, Somerset; England
- Coordinates: 51.4034°N 2.5563°W
- Grid reference: ST614673
- Platforms: 1

Other information
- Status: Disused

History
- Post-grouping: Great Western Railway; Western Region of British Railways

Key dates
- 1 January 1925: Opened
- 2 November 1959: Closed
Location

Whitchurch Halt railway station served the village of Whitchurch, Somerset, England on the Bristol and North Somerset Railway.

== History ==
The station opened on 1 January 1925 by the Great Western Railway. It was situated adjacent to the A37 on Wells Road. Behind the station was an orchard. The station closed to both passengers and goods traffic on 2 November 1959.

Preceding station	Disused railways	Following station
Brislington; Line and station closed	Great Western Railway; Bristol and North Somerset Railway	Pensford; Line and station closed
