= Brislington railway station =

Disused railway station in England

Brislington
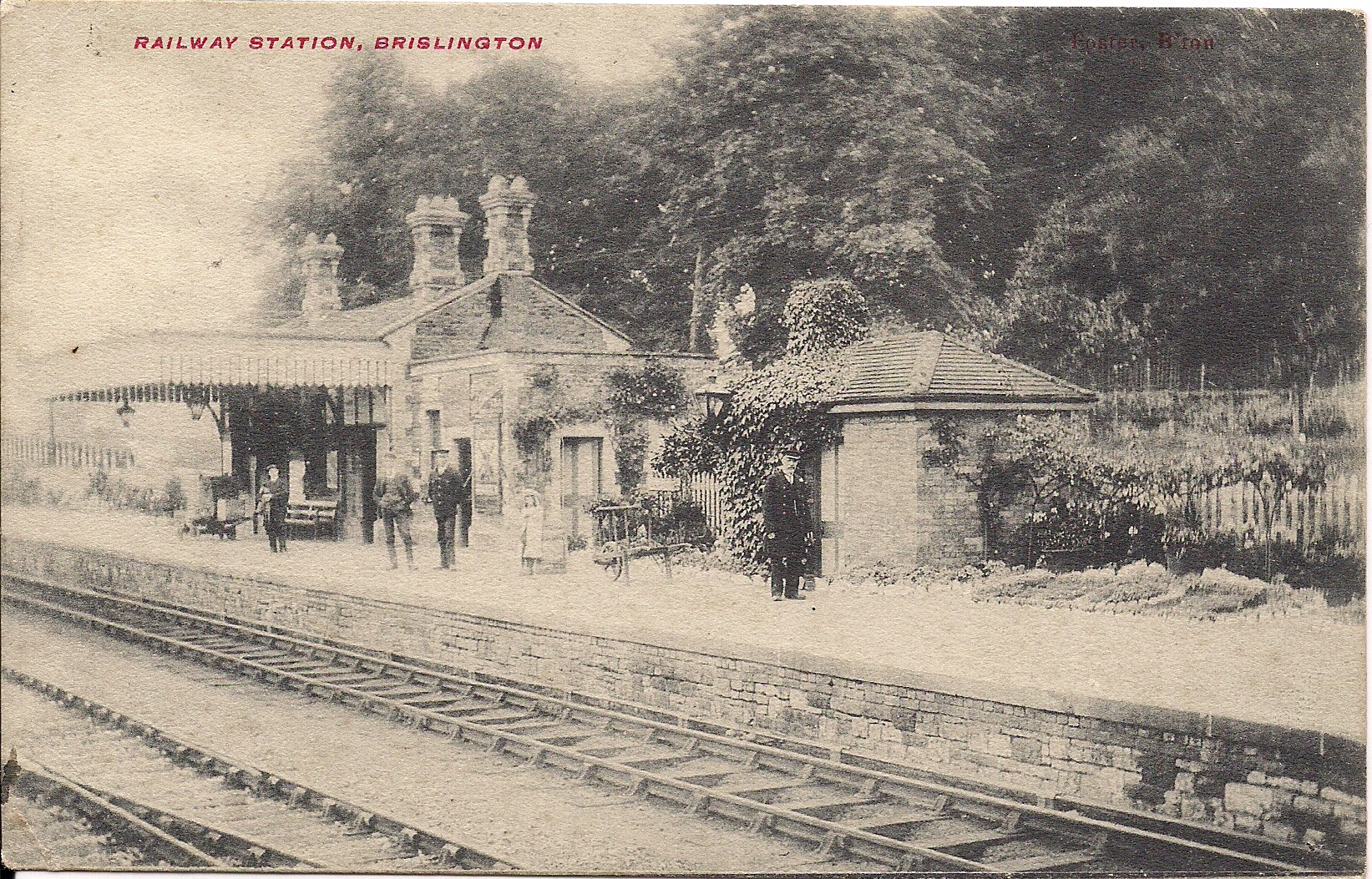
- A postcard of Brislington station around 1904

General information
- Location: Brislington, Bristol; England
- Coordinates: 51.433821°N 2.555345°W
- Grid reference: ST614673
- Platforms: 1

Other information
- Status: Disused

History
- Original company: Great Western Railway
- Pre-grouping: Great Western Railway
- Post-grouping: Great Western Railway Western Region of British Railways

Key dates
- 3 September 1873: Station opened
- 2 November 1959: Station closed to passengers
- 7 October 1963: Station closed for goods
Location

Brislington railway station was a railway station in Brislington, a suburb of Bristol, England.

The station on the Bristol and North Somerset Railway opened on 3 September 1873. It closed to passengers after the last train on 31 October 1959 and to goods traffic on 7 October 1963. The site is off Talbot Road, close to the junction with the A4 Bath Road, and is used as a scrap metal yard. Parts of the platforms remain in place, although no buildings survive.

| Preceding station | Historical railways | Following station |
|---|---|---|
| Bristol Temple Meads; Station open, Line closed | Great Western Railway; Bristol and North Somerset Railway | Whitchurch Halt; Line and station closed |
