= Paulton Memorial Hospital =

- Virgin Care
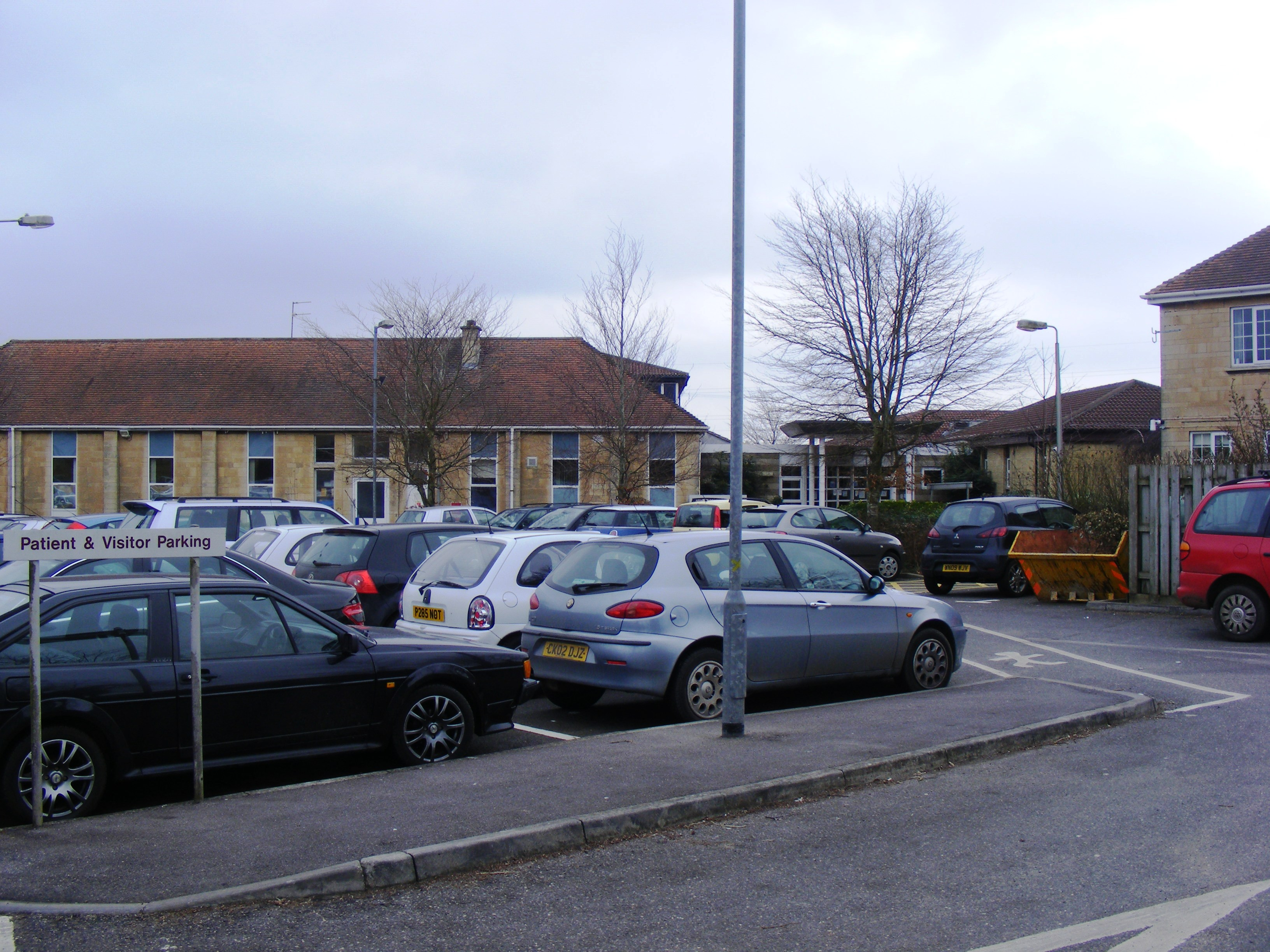
- Paulton Memorial Hospital

- Shown in Somerset

Geography
- Location: Paulton, Somerset, England, United Kingdom
- Coordinates: 51°17′56″N 2°29′37″W

Organisation
- Care system: Public NHS
- Type: Community

Services
- Emergency department: Minor injury Unit
- Beds: 28

History
- Founded: 1872

Links
- Website: virgincare.co.uk/category/bath-and-north-east-somerset/
- Lists: Hospitals in England

Paulton Memorial Hospital is a community hospital located in the village of Paulton, Somerset, approximately 12 miles (19 km) from Bath, managed by HCRG Care Group.

== History ==
The original hospital was founded by Dr Alexander Waugh and Mrs John George Mogg, and was opened by Lord Arthur Hervey, Bishop of Bath and Wells, in October 1872. Extensively upgraded facilities were opened in January 1997. In 2003, plans to close the hospital, as well as a petition to keep it open, were debated in Parliament.

== Services ==
There are 28 beds for inpatients in the hospital ward including six single rooms and the largest bay having six beds. An outpatient service operates five days a week Monday to Friday. Bath and North East Somerset Primary Care Trust provide a specialist local outpatient service. The hospital also has other specialists offering advice, e.g. diabetic nurse specialist, continence advisors, and a one-stop INR clinic weekly and diagnostic ultrasound scans once or twice weekly. The hospital also has a maternity unit, managed by Royal United Hospitals Bath NHS Foundation Trust which performs approximately 120 deliveries a year.

== See also ==
- Healthcare in Somerset
- List of hospitals in England
