= Oliver Brooks =

British Army sergeant & VC (1899-1940)

Oliver Brooks VC
- Born: 31 May 1889; Paulton, Somerset, England
- Died: 25 October 1940 (aged 51); Windsor, Berkshire, England
- Burial place: Windsor Borough Cemetery, Windsor, Berkshire, England
- Military career
- Allegiance: United Kingdom
- Branch: British Army
- Service years: 1906–1913; 1914–1919
- Rank: Sergeant
- Service number: 6738
- Units: Coldstream Guards
- Conflicts: World War I
- Awards: Victoria Cross

Sergeant Oliver Brooks VC (31 May 1889 − 25 October 1940) was a British Army soldier and an English recipient of the Victoria Cross (VC), the highest and most prestigious award for gallantry in the face of the enemy that can be awarded to British and Commonwealth forces.

Born in Paulton, Somerset, he was 26 years old, and a lance-sergeant in the 3rd Battalion, Coldstream Guards, British Army during the First World War when the following deed took place for which he was awarded the VC.

On 8 October 1915 near Loos, France, Lance-Sergeant Brooks led a party of bombers against the enemy who had captured 200 yards of Allied trenches. The regaining of this lost ground was entirely due to the bravery and presence of mind of this NCO who accomplished his task in the midst of a hail of bombs from the enemy.

He later achieved the rank of sergeant.

His Victoria Cross is displayed at The Guards Regimental Headquarters (Coldstream Guards RHQ), Wellington Barracks, London.

The King George V was in France at the time and was seriously injured on 28 October 1915 when thrown by his horse at a troop review. The King sustained a broken pelvis and deep bruising, and he was taken to a hospital train for the journey home. He insisted on presenting the VC to the Lance-Sergeant personally, so Oliver Brooks reported to the King's bedside on the train. With assistance from equerry Sir Charles Cust, the medal was attached to Brooks' uniform by the King.
