= Radstock North railway station =

Former railway station in Somerset, England

Coordinates: 51.2928°N 2.4468°W

Radstock North
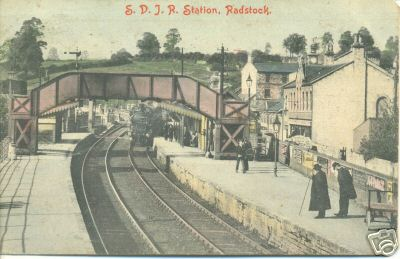

General information
- Location: Radstock, Bath and North East Somerset; England
- Grid reference: ST689550
- Platforms: 2

Other information
- Status: Disused

History
- Pre-grouping: Somerset and Dorset Joint Railway
- Post-grouping: SR and LMSR; Western Region of British Railways

Key dates
- 20 July 1874: Opened (Radstock)
- 26 September 1949: Renamed (Radstock North)
- 7 March 1966: Closed
Location

Radstock North railway station was a station on the Somerset and Dorset Joint Railway in the county of Somerset in England.

== History ==
Opened as Radstock on 20 July 1874, it was located immediately to the northeast of the GWR's Bristol and North Somerset Railway's (B&NSR) Radstock West 1873-1959). However, there was no direct connection between the two competing stations until 1966 (see below).

Due to the extensive collieries in the area sunk into the Somerset Coalfield, the station was more extensive than others serving similar sized communities. Immediately west of the station was a line to Middle Writhlington Colliery, leading to Clandown Colliery and onwards to the local gas works. Immediately to the east of the station were connections to Ludlow Colliery, and the wagonway to Tyning Colliery. Further east towards Shoscombe was a junction giving access to Lower Writhlington Colliery, Braysdown Colliery and Writhlington Colliery.

The station itself consisted of two platforms, a goods yard and cattle dock, wagon works, and a two-road engine shed with coaling and watering facilities. To the east of the station and locomotive servicing facilities were the former Wheeler & Gregory Wagon Works, and a private timber yard. Operations were controlled from two signal boxes, with a third to the east controlling access to the colliery line's there.

The station closed to goods in 1964. After the decision to close the S&DJR in 1966, a connection was made to the west of the station with the GWR mainline. This allowed trains on the former B&NSR to traverse a short spur through Radstock North to the Lower Writhlington, Braysdown and Writhlington collieries, to transport coal to Portishead power station. Passenger services were withdrawn when the SDJR closed on 7 March 1966. After the last coal from the Somerset Coalfield was extracted from Writhlington Colliery on 28 September 1973, the spur was dismantled.

== Accident ==
A head-on collision at Foxcote near Radstock was the worst accident in the line's history.

== The site today ==
The site is now a green space alongside a road.

Preceding station	Disused railways	Following station
Midsomer Norton South; Line and station closed	Somerset & Dorset Joint Railway; LSWR & Midland Railways	Shoscombe and Single Hill Halt; Line and station closed
