= Farrington Gurney Halt railway station =

Disused railway station in Farrington Gurney, Somerset

Farrington Gurney Halt
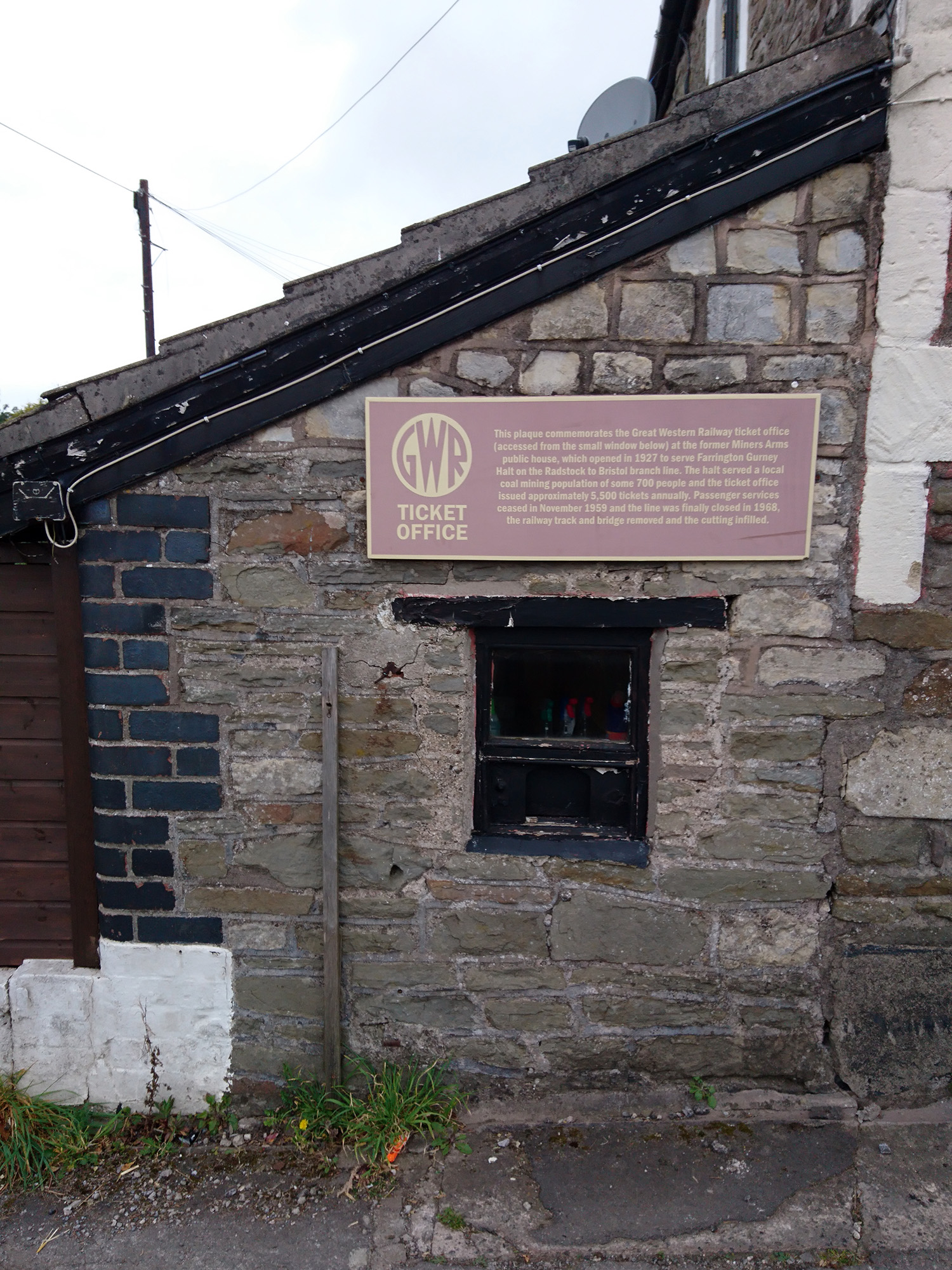
- The former ticket office at the station in 2017

General information
- Location: Farrington Gurney, Somerset; England
- Coordinates: 51.2959°N 2.5205°W
- Grid reference: ST639543
- Platforms: 1

Other information
- Status: Disused

History
- Post-grouping: Great Western Railway

Key dates
- 11 July 1927: Opened
- 2 November 1959: Closed
Location

Farrington Gurney Halt railway station served the village of Farrington Gurney, Somerset, England from 1927 to 1959 on the Bristol and North Somerset Railway.

== History ==
The station opened on 11 July 1927 by the Great Western Railway. Passengers had to buy their tickets from a tiny office behind the Miner's Arms pub. The station was closed to both passengers and goods traffic on 2 November 1959.

Preceding station	Disused railways	Following station
Hallatrow; Line and station closed	Great Western Railway; Bristol and North Somerset Railway	Midsomer Norton and Welton; Line and station closed
