= Clutton railway station =

Disused railway station in Clutton, Somerset

Clutton
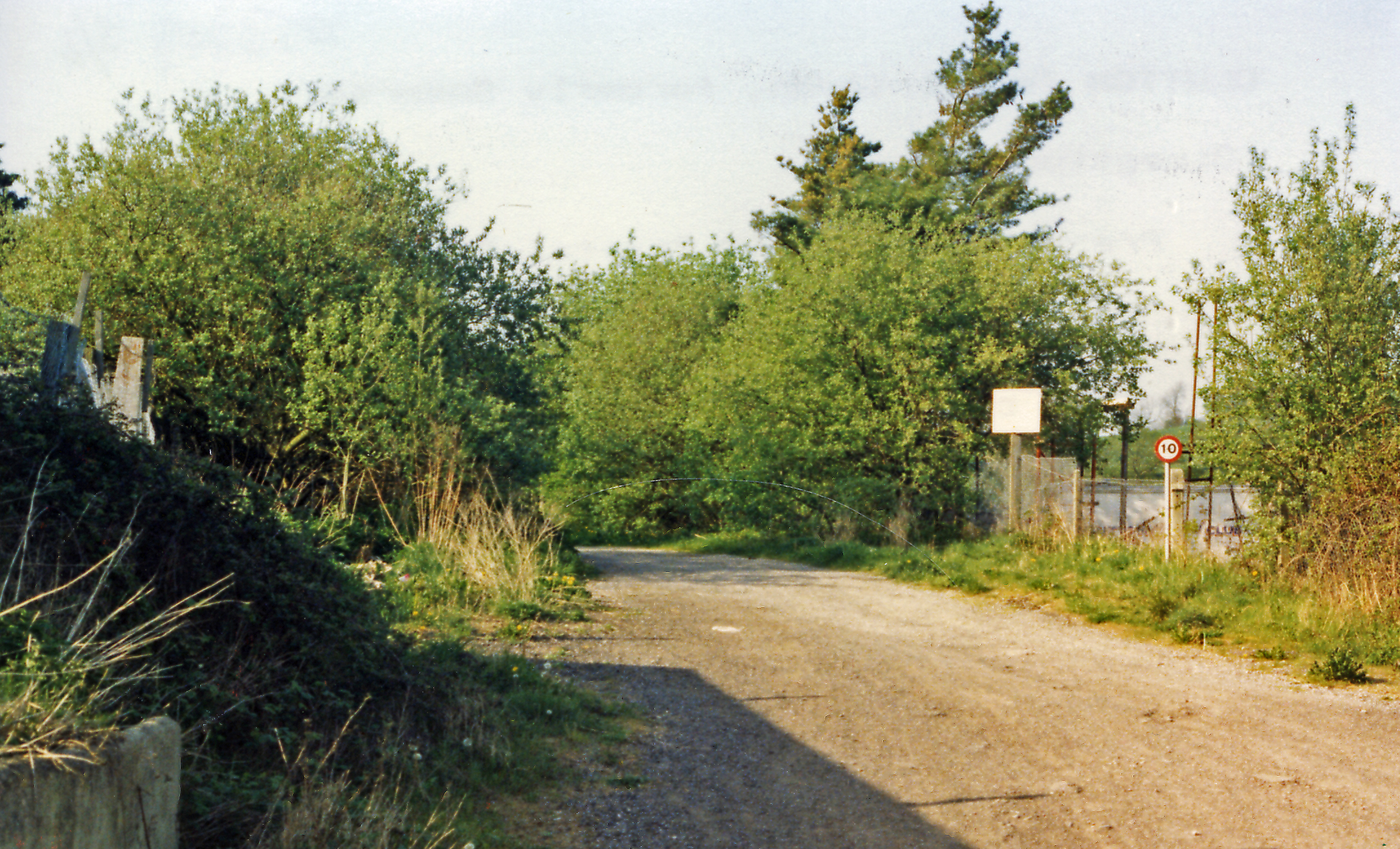
- The site of the station, looking northwest towards Bristol, in 1987

General information
- Location: Clutton, Somerset; England
- Coordinates: 51.331009°N 2.537364°W
- Grid reference: ST627593
- Platforms: 2

Other information
- Status: Disused

History
- Original company: Great Western Railway
- Pre-grouping: Great Western Railway
- Post-grouping: Great Western Railway

Key dates
- 3 September 1873: Opened
- 2 November 1959: Closed to passengers
- 15 June 1964: Closed completely
Location

Clutton railway station served the village of Clutton, Somerset, England from 1873 to 1959 on the Bristol and North Somerset Railway.

== History ==
The station opened on 3 September 1873 by the Great Western Railway. The station closed to passengers on 2 November 1959 and to goods traffic on 15 June 1964.

Preceding station	Disused railways	Following station
Pensford; Line and station closed	Great Western Railway; Bristol and North Somerset Railway	Hallatrow; Line and station closed
