= Greyfield Wood =

Woodland in Somerset, England

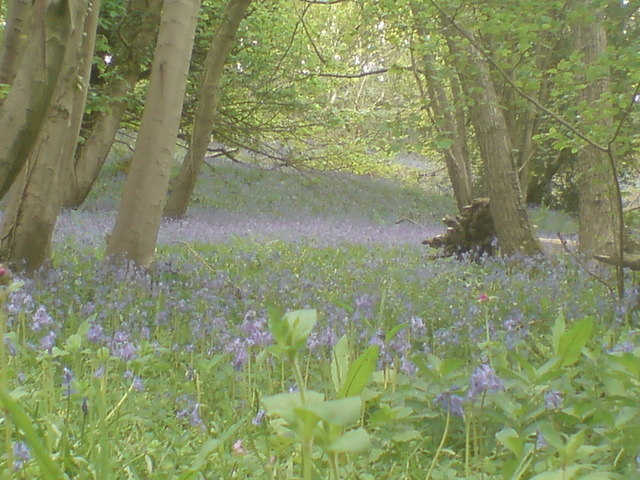
- Bluebells in Greyfield Wood

- Location within England

Geography
- Location: Somerset, England
- Coordinates: 51°19′26″N 02°31′24″W
- Area: 36.23 hectares (89.5 acres)

Administration
- Authority: Woodland Trust

Greyfield Wood is a woodland to the west of High Littleton, Somerset, England. It is around 16 km (9.9 mi) from Bath and 19 km (12 mi) from Bristol. It is a mixture of ancient woodland and new planting.

== History ==
Greyfield wood was once part of the Earl of Warwick's hunting estate.

Part of the wood was once Greyfield Colliery, which was the biggest single industry in the area in the middle of the 18th Century. The colliery closed in 1911.

== In popular culture ==
Greyfield Wood, and the waterfall at Stephen's Vale Nature Reserve, were used as locations for filming the British television series Robin of Sherwood.
