= Mells Road railway station =

Disused railway station in Somerset, England

Mells Road

General information
- Location: Mells, Somerset; England
- Coordinates: 51.2583°N 2.4098°W
- Grid reference: ST715511
- Platforms: 2

Other information
- Status: Disused

History
- Original company: Bristol and North Somerset Railway
- Pre-grouping: Great Western Railway

Key dates
- 1 March 1875: Opened as Mells
- 16 November 1898: Name changed to Mells Road
- 17 September 1956: Name changed to Mells Road Halt
- 2 November 1959: Closed
Location

Mells Road railway station served the village of Mells, Somerset, England from 1875 to 1959 linking Radstock to Frome, Somerset on the Heart of Wessex Line.

== History ==
The station opened as Mells on 1 March 1875 by the Bristol and North Somerset Railway. 'Road' was added to its name on 16 November 1898 and 'Halt' was added to its name on 17 September 1956. The station was closed to both passengers and goods traffic on 2 November 1959.

Preceding station	Disused railways	Following station
Radstock West; Line and station closed	Great Western Railway; Bristol and North Somerset Railway	Frome; Line closed, station open
