= High Littleton =

Village in Somerset, England

Coordinates: 51.324°N 2.511°W

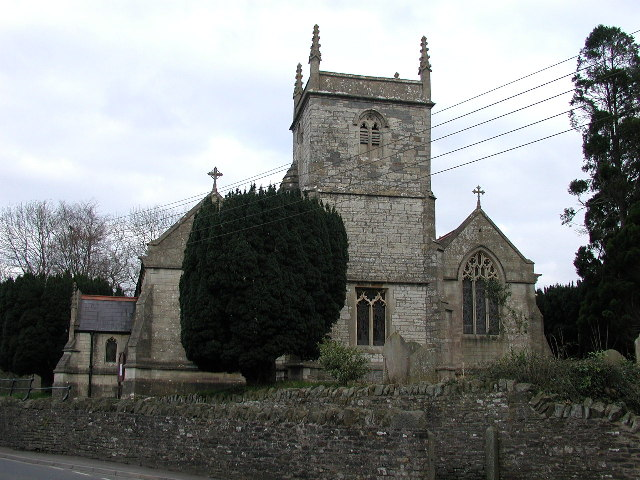
- Holy Trinity Church

- Location within Somerset
- Population: 2,104 (2011)
- OS grid reference: ST645584
- Unitary authority: Bath and North East Somerset
- Ceremonial county: Somerset
- Region: South West
- Country: England
- Sovereign state: United Kingdom
- Post town: BRISTOL
- Postcode district: BS39
- Dialling code: 01761
- Police: Avon and Somerset
- Fire: Avon
- Ambulance: South Western
- UK Parliament: North East Somerset and Hanham
- Website: Parish Council

High Littleton is a village and civil parish in Somerset, England, about 1.2 miles (1.9 km) north of Paulton and 7.5 miles (12 km) south-west of Bath. The parish includes the small village of Hallatrow and the hamlets of White Cross, Greyfield and Mearns; the northeastern part of High Littleton village is known as Rotcombe.

High Littleton and Hallatrow are on the A39 Wells-Bath road, which is crossed by the A37 Shepton Mallet to Bristol road at White Cross. There is a Church of England Voluntary Controlled primary school (4–11 years) in the village, together with several pubs and shops.

== History ==
There is evidence of settlement at High Littleton since Saxon times in the late 7th or 8th century. They called it Lytel tun. Hallatrow may have been much older.

In the Domesday Survey of 1086, each village covered an area of about 600 acres (2.4 km^{2}). In early times the villages would have been almost entirely farmed, mostly arable farming but with a mixture of dairy farming and sheep raising.

The parish was part of the hundred of Chewton.

According to Robinson it is listed in the 1086 Domesday Book as Liteltone meaning 'The little enclosure' from the Old English lytel and tun. The property was owned by the Bishop of Coutances and sub-let to a tenant named as Ralph Rufus.

=== Mining and geology ===
Coal mines were established in the area by 1633 because on the Somerset coalfield the coal seams ran obliquely to the surface. The first deep mine in the parish was Mearns Coalworks which began in 1783.

During the 1790s, William Smith worked extensively in the area as a mine surveyor and as chief surveyor for the Somerset Coal Canal; and it was during this time that he formulated his ideas of rock stratification. He describes the area as the 'birthplace of geology'.

By 1800 the population had grown to about 800; however, many of these may have worked in mines outside the parish. The Greyfield Coal Company did not start until 1833. It received a boost with the opening of the Bristol and North Somerset Railway in 1873. Greyfield Colliery closed in 1911 and the railway in 1964.

=== Transport ===
Hallatrow was an important station on the Bristol and North Somerset Railway, and the junction for the branch line to Camerton, which opened in 1882 and which was later extended eastwards along the line of the former Somerset Coal Canal to a junction at Limpley Stoke with the line from Bath to Bradford-on-Avon.

In addition to its role as a junction, Hallatrow was also an important goods depot, receiving milk from local farms, printed materials from Purnells' factory at Paulton and local coal. The station closed when the Bristol and North Somerset line closed to passenger traffic in 1959; goods services were withdrawn in 1964 and the last train ran in 1968.

== Governance ==
The parish council has responsibility for local issues, including setting an annual precept (local rate) to cover the council's operating costs and producing annual accounts for public scrutiny. The parish council evaluates local planning applications and works with the local police, district council officers, and neighbourhood watch groups on matters of crime, security, and traffic. The parish council's role also includes initiating projects for the maintenance and repair of parish facilities, such as the village hall or community centre, playing fields and playgrounds, as well as consulting with the district council on the maintenance, repair, and improvement of highways, drainage, footpaths, public transport, and street cleaning. Conservation matters (including trees and listed buildings) and environmental issues are also of interest to the council.

High Littleton is a ward represented by one councillor on the unitary authority of Bath and North East Somerset which was created in 1996, as established by the Local Government Act 1992. It provides a single tier of local government with responsibility for almost all local government functions within its area including local planning and building control, local roads, council housing, environmental health, markets and fairs, refuse collection, recycling, cemeteries, crematoria, leisure services, parks, and tourism. it is also responsible for education, social services, libraries, main roads, public transport, trading standards, waste disposal and strategic planning, although fire, police and ambulance services are provided jointly with other authorities through the Avon Fire and Rescue Service, Avon and Somerset Constabulary and the Great Western Ambulance Service.

Bath and North East Somerset's area covers part of the ceremonial county of Somerset but it is administered independently of the non-metropolitan county. Its administrative headquarters is in Bath. Between 1 April 1974 and 1 April 1996, it was the Wansdyke district and the City of Bath of the county of Avon. Before 1974 that the parish was part of the Clutton Rural District.

An electoral ward with the same name exists. Although High Littleton is the most populous area, the ward stretches south to Farrington Gurney. The total population of the ward as at the census 2011 was 3,005.

The parish is represented in the House of Commons of the Parliament of the United Kingdom as part of North East Somerset and Hanham. It elects one Member of Parliament (MP) by the first past the post system of election.

== Demographics ==
According to the 2001 Census, the High Littleton Ward had 1,322 residents, living in 490 households, with an average age of 40.7 years. Of these 73% of residents describing their health as 'good', 20% of 16- to 74-year-olds had no qualifications; and the area had an unemployment rate of 1.4% of all economically active people aged 16–74. In the Index of Multiple Deprivation 2004, it was ranked at 31,729 out of 32,482 wards in England, where 1 was the most deprived LSOA and 32,482 the least deprived.

== Church ==
The church is dedicated to the Holy Trinity and is an ancient stone edifice with a tower. It contains monuments of the Mogg and Hodge families dating back to the 15th century. On 15 July 1310 the advowson of the church at High Littleton was given to the abbey by Gilbert Aumery, and Bishop Drokensford sanctioned its appropriation by the abbey in 1322, but the royal licence is dated 1328. In 1322 the bishop approved the appropriation of the church of High Littleton to Keynsham, because of the losses which the abbey had sustained in the floods, rain, and murrain in its lands in Ireland and Wales, and in its loss of the tithes of Chewstoke. The church is a Grade II listed building, with monuments in the churchyard listed themselves.

The church is now run by the vicar of Holy Trinity Church, Paulton creating the joint benefices of Paulton, High Littleton and Farrington Gurney, due to the vicar of High Littleton retiring.

== Buildings ==
The parish has several fine houses still existing: The Grange, Hallatrow is dated 1669 and High Littleton House was built by Thomas Hodges around 1710.

== Grade II listed buildings ==
- Historic England. "Rugbourne Farmhouse (1320758)". National Heritage List for England.
- Historic England. "Gazebo on boundary wall, 30 metres east of The Court (1312737)". National Heritage List for England.
- Historic England. "The Court (1320759)". National Heritage List for England.
- Historic England. "High Littleton House (1136525)". National Heritage List for England.
- Historic England. "The Shop (1129569)". National Heritage List for England.
- Historic England. "The Willows (1136536)". National Heritage List for England.
- Historic England. "Cottage Farm (1320761)". National Heritage List for England.
- Historic England. "Meadow Lea and garden railings (1129571)". National Heritage List for England.
- Historic England. "Tennis Court Farmhouse (1136543)". National Heritage List for England.
- Historic England. "Brook Farmhouse (1129568)". National Heritage List for England.
- Historic England. "Gatepiers to stable court at The Grange (1136516)". National Heritage List for England.
- Historic England. "The Grange (1129567)". National Heritage List for England.
- Historic England. "Church of Holy Trinity (1320760)". National Heritage List for England.
- Historic England. "Brodribb monument (1312742)". National Heritage List for England.
- Historic England. "Lansdown monument (1129570)". National Heritage List for England.

== In popular culture ==
The television series Robin of Sherwood was partly filmed nearby in the Greyfield Woods.

== Notable residents ==
Previous residents include William Smith (1769–1839), who worked for the Somerset Coal Canal. The writer and broadcaster Alan Gibson lived in High Littleton and often referred to The Star public house in his cricket reports in The Times.
