= Radstock West railway station =

Disused railway station in Radstock, Somerset

Radstock West
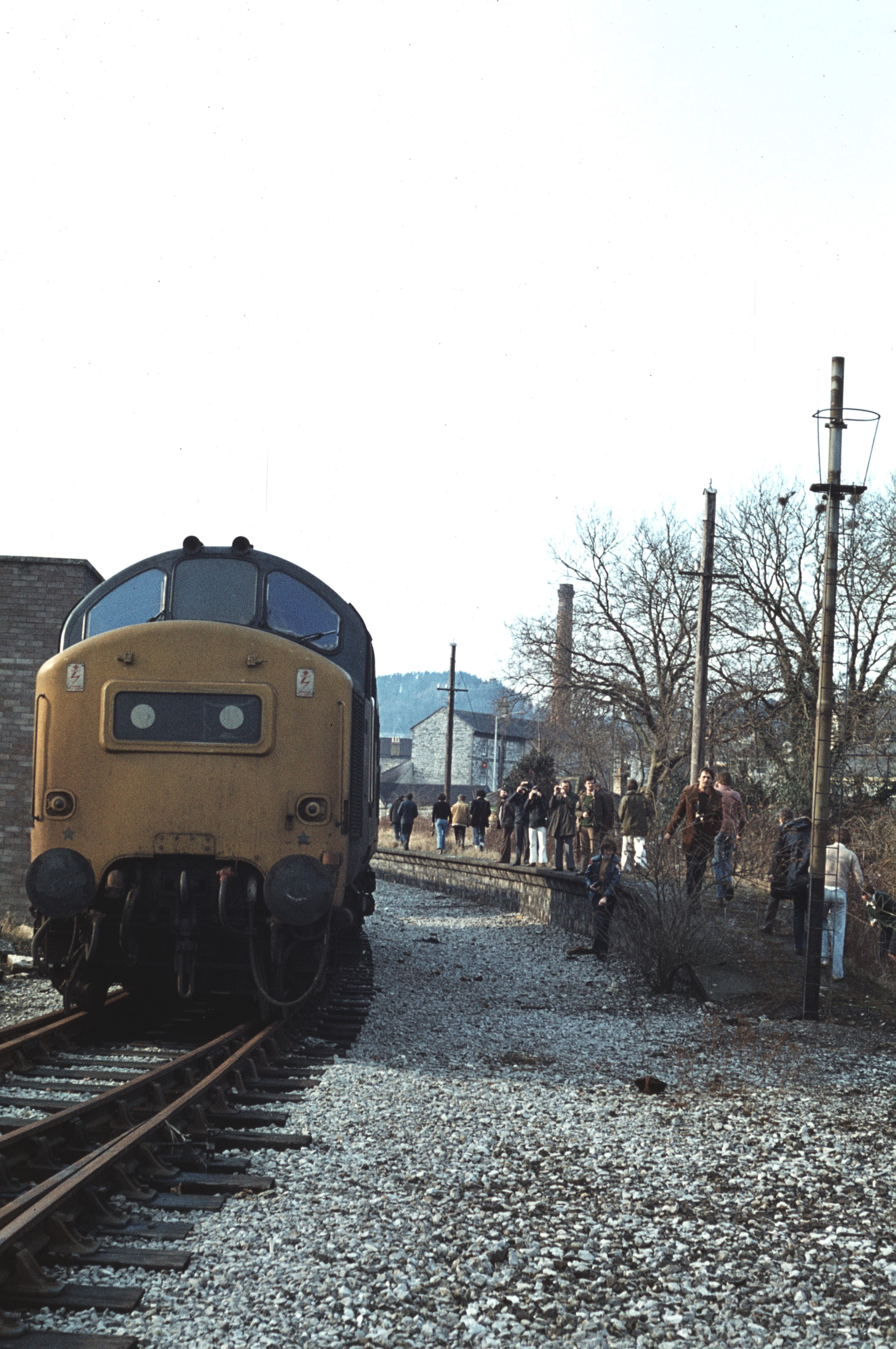
- A railtour at Radstock in 1979

General information
- Location: Radstock, Somerset; England
- Coordinates: 51.292464°N 2.447464°W
- Platforms: 2

Other information
- Status: Disused

History
- Original company: Bristol and North Somerset Railway
- Pre-grouping: Great Western Railway
- Post-grouping: Great Western Railway

Key dates
- 3 September 1873: Opened as Radstock
- 26 September 1949: Renamed Radstock West
- 2 November 1959: Closed
Location

Radstock West railway station was a station on the Bristol and North Somerset Railway which served the town of Radstock in Somerset, England.

== History ==
Opened as Radstock on 3 September 1873, the station was renamed Radstock West on 26 September 1949, and closed on 2 November 1959. It was located immediately to the southwest of the Somerset and Dorset Joint Railway's station, Radstock North (1874-1966).

Concurrently with the closure of the S&DJR on 7 March 1966, a connection was made to the S&DJR. This allowed trains on the former B&NSR to traverse a short spur through Radstock North to the Lower Writhlington, Braysdown and Writhlington collieries, to transport coal to Portishead power station. After the last coal from the Somerset Coalfield was extracted from Writhlington Colliery on 28 September 1973, the spur was dismantled.

| Preceding station | Disused railways | Following station |
|---|---|---|
| Mells Road; Line and station closed | Great Western Railway; Bristol and North Somerset Railway | Midsomer Norton and Welton; Line and station closed |
