= New Zealand cricket team in England in 1983 =

International cricket tour

The New Zealand cricket team toured England in the 1983 season to play a four-match Test series against England. England won the series 3–1 with no matches drawn. New Zealand won the second Test of the series, their first Test win in England. In the same match, Bob Willis became the fourth bowler to take 300 Test wickets.

== Test series summary ==
=== First Test ===
14–18 July 1983
(5-day match)
Scorecard

England	v	New Zealand
209 (70.4 overs); DW Randall 75* (128); RJ Hadlee 6/53 (23.4 overs)		196 (57 overs); RJ Hadlee 84 (78); RGD Willis 4/43 (20 overs)
446/6d (189.2 overs); CJ Tavaré 109 (259); RJ Hadlee 2/99 (37.2 overs)		270 (110.1 overs); JG Wright 88 (188); VJ Marks 3/78 (43 overs)

England won by 189 runs
The Oval, London
Umpires: HD Bird and DGL Evans
Player of the match: RJ Hadlee (NZ)

- England won the toss and elected to bat.

=== Second Test ===
28 July–1 August 1983
(5-day match)
Scorecard

England	v	New Zealand
225 (89.2 overs); CJ Tavaré 69 (229); BL Cairns 7/74 (33.2 overs)		377 (139.3 overs); JG Wright 93 (226); RGD Willis 4/57 (23.3 overs)
252 (87 overs); DI Gower 112* (196); EJ Chatfield 5/95 (29 overs)		103/5 (27.1 overs); JG Wright 26 (43); RGD Willis 5/35 (14 overs)

New Zealand won by 5 wickets
Headingley, Leeds
Umpires: DJ Constant and BJ Meyer
Player of the match: BL Cairns (NZ)

- New Zealand won the toss and elected to field.
- 31 July was taken as a rest day.
- The match was scheduled for five days but completed in four.

=== Third Test ===
11–15 August 1983
(5-day match)
Scorecard

England	v	New Zealand
326 (120.3 overs); DI Gower 108 (200); RJ Hadlee 5/93 (40 overs)		191 (84.4 overs); BA Edgar 70 (190); NGB Cook 5/35 (26 overs)
211 (89.3 overs); IT Botham 61 (101); EJ Chatfield 3/29 (13.3 overs)		219 (69.2 overs); JV Coney 68 (118); RGD Willis 3/24 (12 overs)

England won by 127 runs
Lord's, London
Umpires: DJ Constant and DGL Evans
Player of the match: DI Gower (ENG)

- New Zealand won the toss and elected to field.
- 14 August was taken as a rest day.
- The match was scheduled for five days but completed in four.
- NGB Cook, NA Foster and CL Smith (all ENG), and EJ Gray (NZ) made their Test debuts.

=== Fourth Test ===
25–29 August 1983
(5-day match)
Scorecard

England	v	New Zealand
420 (124.4 overs); IT Botham 103 (103); JG Bracewell 4/108 (28 overs)		207 (82 overs); BA Edgar 62 (164); NGB Cook 5/63 (32 overs)
297 (92 overs); AJ Lamb 137* (219); RJ Hadlee 4/85 (28 overs)		345 (129 overs); RJ Hadlee 92* (118); NGB Cook 4/87 (50 overs)

England won by 165 runs
Trent Bridge, Nottingham
Umpires: HD Bird and BJ Meyer
Player of the match: NGB Cook (ENG)

- England won the toss and elected to bat.
- TJ Franklin (NZ) made his Test debut.

== External sources ==
- New Zealand in England 1983 at CricketArchive

== Annual reviews ==
- Playfair Cricket Annual 1984
- Wisden Cricketers' Almanack 1984
