= Hallatrow railway station =

Disused railway station in High Littleton, Somerset

Hallatrow
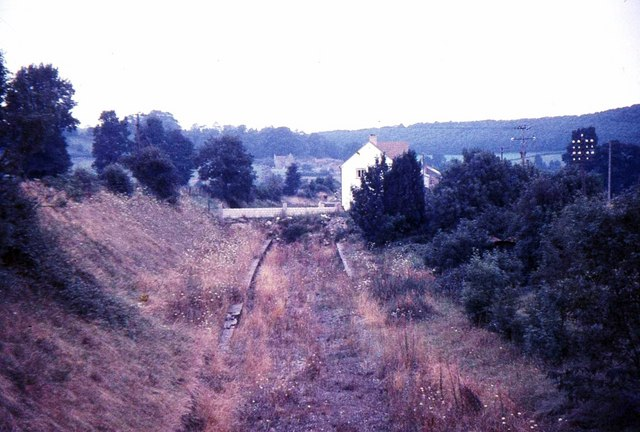
- The overgrown trackbed at what was once Hallatrow station

General information
- Location: High Littleton, Somerset; England
- Coordinates: 51.3127°N 2.5294°W
- Grid reference: ST632572
- Platforms: 2

Other information
- Status: Disused

History
- Original company: Great Western Railway

Key dates
- 3 September 1873: Opened
- 2 November 1959: Closed to passengers
- 1964: Closed completely
Location

Hallatrow railway station served the village of High Littleton, Somerset, England from 1873 to 1959 on the Bristol and North Somerset Railway.

== History ==
The station was opened on 3 September 1873 by the Great Western Railway. It closed to passengers on 2 November 1959 and to goods traffic in 1964.

Preceding station	Disused railways	Following station
Clutton; Line and station closed	Great Western Railway; Bristol and North Somerset Railway	Farrington Gurney Halt; Line and station closed
