= Bristol and North Somerset Railway =

English railway line, 1873–1959

Overview
- Owner: British Rail

History
- Opened: 1873
- Closed: 1959

Technical
- Track gauge: 1,435 mm (4 ft 8 1/2 in)
- Old gauge: 7 ft 1/4 in (2,140 mm)

The Bristol and North Somerset Railway was a railway line in the West of England that connected Bristol with Radstock, through Pensford and further into northern Somerset, to allow access to the Somerset Coalfield. The line ran almost due south from Bristol and was 16 miles (26 km) long.

Opened in 1873, it joined with an existing branch from Frome to Radstock, and was later worked with it as a single entity. In 1882 the Camerton Branch was opened by the Great Western Railway to serve collieries at Camerton; it was later extended to Limpley Stoke, on the Bath to Trowbridge line. It closed to passenger traffic in 1925.

The line's primary traffic was coal, and travel to work commuting into Bristol. Both of these traffic sources substantially declined in the 1950s, with the Camerton Branch fully closed in 1951. Passenger traffic ceased on the rest of the entire line complex before the Beeching Axe in 1959, with complete closure of the line in 1973 following the closure of the last colliery in the Somerset Coalfield at Kilmersdon.

== History ==
=== Getting an act of Parliament for the line ===
The Wilts, Somerset and Weymouth Railway (WS&WR) was established in 1845 to build a network of lines, running from near Chippenham on the Great Western Railway (GWR) to Salisbury and Weymouth. At that time Radstock was the most important mining centre of the Somerset Coalfield, and the WS&WR included in its plans a branch from near Frome to Radstock. The WS&WR found raising money for its ambitious network difficult, and the company sold its lines, not all of which were complete, to the GWR on 14 March 1850, confirmed by the Great Western Railway Act 1851 (14 & 15 Vict. c. xlviii) obtained on 3 July 1851. The GWR opened the Radstock branch to mineral traffic only on 14 November 1854, built to broad gauge.

As early as 1863 the board of the GWR had resolved to create a standard gauge line from Bristol to Salisbury through the district, (Note: I.e. standard gauge; in the conflict between the GWR's traditional track gauge known as the broad gauge and standard gauge, the latter was often referred to as narrow gauge for contrast.) and there were numerous independent schemes to serve the important colliery sites north of Radstock, and link them to the city of Bristol.

These schemes came to nothing until in September 1862 when promoters formed an agreement to make a line from Bristol, with connections to other lines there, to a junction with the newly formed Somerset and Dorset Railway near Bruton, (Note: The Somerset and Dorset Railway was formed on 1 September 1862 by the amalgamation of the Somerset Central Railway and the Dorset Central Railway; it ran from Highbridge to Templecombe and Blandford to Wimborne, with plans to connect the two portions of line; the Bath extension was opened on 20 July 1874 and became the Somerset and Dorset Joint Railway on 13 July 1876. See Atthill and Nock.) running through the colliery areas of Pensford and Clutton, and with a branch to Camerton, where there were further collieries. It was to connect at Bristol with both broad gauge and narrow gauge lines, as well as having a tramway to the City Docks at the Floating Harbour.

Bristol and North Somerset Railway Act 1863
- Act of Parliament
- Parliament of the United Kingdom
- Long title: An Act for making a Railway from the Great Western Railway at Radstock to Bristol, together with Branches therefrom to Camerton and other Places; and for other Purposes.
- Citation: 26 & 27 Vict. c. clxviii

Dates
- Royal assent: 21 July 1863

Text of statute as originally enacted

The proposal became a parliamentary bill, and the Bristol and North Somerset Railway Act 1863 (26 & 27 Vict. c. clxviii) received royal assent on 21 July 1863: it was to be called the Bristol and North Somerset Railway, with capital of £275,000 and borrowing powers of £91,000.

This appeared to serve the GWR objective admirably; the Wilts, Somerset and Weymouth had a branch to Radstock, and the network also served Salisbury; if the gauge of their Radstock branch were mixed, the desired through route to Salisbury would be created via Radstock at minimum cost. However, when the Bristol and North Somerset Railway (B&NSR) approached the GWR to explore the GWR's willingness to work the line, and to run passenger trains on their Frome—Radstock line, the GWR's reaction was cool.

=== A series of proposed extensions ===
Following this success in Parliament, the company immediately set about proposing extensions as bills for the 1864 session: from onward from the authorised Camerton branch to Bath; from the main line to Shepton Mallet, to join the East Somerset Railway there; and various branches in Bristol and at the docks there.

Three bills followed for the 1865 session: for a railway from Radstock passing Writhlington (where there was an important colliery) and through Wellow and Midford to Monkton Combe, on the Bradford on Avon to Bathampton line; for a line from Farrington Gurney to Shepton Mallet and the East Somerset line again; and from near Hallatrow to the Midland Railway Bath branch, joining it between Weston and Kelston, west of Bath, connecting with the Great Western Railway (GWR) line in passing.

In 1866 the GWR and the Bristol and North Somerset Railway (B&NSR) jointly submitted a bill for a line from Mells through Nettlebridge, south of Radstock, to Chilcompton.

Bristol and North Somerset Railway Act 1869
- Act of Parliament
- Parliament of the United Kingdom
- Long title: An Act for arranging the affairs of the Bristol and North Somerset Railway Company, and for other purposes.
- Citation: 32 & 33 Vict. c. cxi

Dates
- Royal assent: 12 July 1869

Text of statute as originally enacted

In 1869 the B&NSR obtained an act of Parliament, the Bristol and North Somerset Railway Act 1869 (32 & 33 Vict. c. cxi), confirming its powers to build the harbour tramway at Bristol.

None of these lines was built by the company; only the line from a junction with the GWR immediately east of Bristol Temple Meads to Radstock was built. (Note: Vincent provides the only available source material for these parliamentary efforts; presumably all these bills were thrown out. Vincent says (page 45) that the GWR and B&NSR together "deposited a joint act in 1866"; an act of Parliament can't be deposited; it is not clear whether he means they submitted a bill in 1866 for the 1867 session of Parliament, or that they obtained the act of Parliament in 1866.)

The Somerset and Dorset Railway (S&DR) was independent at this time, and the B&NSR made overtures to that company about an alliance or merger. This seemed to be a more fruitful way forward, and parliamentary bills were deposited to authorise the merger, and a physical connection at Shepton Mallet, but in May 1866 it emerged that the S&DR had undertaken to route major traffic flows via the Bristol and Exeter Railway, with which it connected at Highbridge. This frustrated any advantage for the B&NSR in merging, and its Bill was withdrawn.

=== Construction, and collapse ===
Having obtained its authorising act of Parliament, the Bristol and North Somerset Railway Act 1863, the company appointed its engineer, James Frazer, and a contractor, Bethell and Walton. However Bethell and Walton asked for an advance of payment, but only got some shares in the company. They had what is now called a cash-flow problem, and further requests for cash came from them, with little work output to show. On 9 April 1864 they were given a formal ultimatum by the company secretary, at which they declared that they would not continue with the work. A firm called Lawrence and Fry took over the works, while Bethell and Walton issued demands for payment for work done. The company itself was desperately short of money as subscribers had failed to respond to calls, and land acquisition was proving unaffordable; then on 27 June 1864 it was announced that Lawrence and Fry had become bankrupt. Lawrence subsequently approached the company in his private capacity, and a deal was struck enabling him to work as the company's contractor.

The company's money shortage meant that little real progress seems to have taken place; perhaps the company's management focus had been on parliamentary work on extensions. In July 1866 the banking firm of Overend, Gurney and Company failed, and this triggered a financial crisis; many people lost large amounts of money, and obtaining share subscriptions for new construction became, for a time impossible. The Bristol and North Somerset Railway Company found that raising finance was now impossible, and the company "collapsed". At a shareholders' meeting on 4 May 1867, the board disclosed that the company was now in the hands of creditors. Moreover, of the authorised share capital of £275,000, only £16,080 of shares had been applied for and issued; more had been given free to unfortunate suppliers and contractors in payment. Individual directors had given personal surety for company borrowings in the amount of £180,000; this was twice the authorised quantum. The liabilities were said to amount to £300,000, and sums expended could not be made to equate to work actually completed. The company secretary John Bingham became embroiled in claims of improper dealings. The "collapse" of the company was complete.

=== A new company ===
Bristol and North Somerset Railway Act 1868
- Act of Parliament
- Parliament of the United Kingdom
- Long title: An Act to authorize the Bristol and North Somerset Railway Company to deviate from the authorized Line of their Railway at Bristol; and for other Purposes.
- Citation: 31 & 32 Vict. c. clxxviii

Dates
- Royal assent: 31 July 1868

Bristol and North Somerset Railway Act 1870
- Act of Parliament
- Parliament of the United Kingdom
- Long title: An Act to authorise the Bristol and North Somerset Railway Company to deviate from the authorised line of their Railway at Radstock; and for other purposes.
- Citation: 33 & 34 Vict. c. cxxx

Dates
- Royal assent: 14 July 1870

Text of statute as originally enacted

Many people had lost a lot of money, but the area still needed a railway line, and a new Bristol and North Somerset Railway was created, authorised by an act of Parliament, the Bristol and North Somerset Railway Act 1868 (31 & 32 Vict. c. clxxviii) of 31 July 1868. The engineer was William Clarke and his first task was to assess what physical works had actually been made. As well as doing so, he proposed a simplification of the route at Radstock making a northerly sweep and avoiding housing in the town centre, and joining more directly into the GWR terminus. This required another authorising act of Parliament, the Bristol and North Somerset Railway Act 1870 (33 & 34 Vict. c. cxxx), and it was obtained on 14 July 1870. (Note: Vincent describes this as the B&NSR (Deviation at Radstock) Act of 30 November 1869, but that must be the date of deposition of the bill.)

On getting the Bristol and North Somerset Railway Act 1870, the company sought offers from contractors and John Perry and Sons of Stratford quoted £90,000 to complete the line, and was awarded contracts. The intention was to open at least between Bristol and Pensford by the following spring of 1871. Further problems were encountered with the quality and rate of progress of the construction, but at length the line was ready for the Board of Trade inspection. Col. Rich visited the line on 2 September 1873. His report alluded to a great number of detail matters, but he approved the opening.

=== Opening at last ===
The opening of the line took place on 3 September 1873. It was built on the standard gauge, and it was worked by the Great Western Railway (GWR).

The new Bristol and North Somerset Railway (B&NSR) line met the Wilts, Somerset and Weymouth Railway (WS&WR) line at Radstock, but that was a broad gauge line, so there was a break of gauge at Radstock. The opening of the B&NSR activated a neglected obligation on the GWR: in February 1874 the GWR board recorded that:

By the terms of an Agreement with the Bristol and North Somerset Company and the principal Colliery Proprietors of the Radstock District, this Company is under engagement to lay the narrow gauge between Radstock and Salisbury on or before 3rd September next ... In view of this obligation, the Directors ... consider that the convenience of the public will be best met, and the interest of the Proprietors best secured, by the alteration from Broad to Narrow Gauge of all the Lines in the district which these railways accommodate.

In fact the entire Wilts, Somerset and Weymouth network, 131 miles of line, now GWR property, was to be converted to standard gauge, triggered by the opening of the B&NSR line. The standard gauge was ready for the first time on 22 June 1874.

The GWR continued with the upgrading of the Frome to Witham line, making it ready for passenger operation; this included laying a west curve at Frome to reach the station there; the mineral line connection faced Westbury. On 5 July 1875 following an inspection by Col. Yolland, the line opened to passengers. There were five trains between Bristol and Frome via Radstock daily, with two on Sundays.

MacDermot summarises the events from the GWR point of view in stark terms:

The opening of the Bristol and North Somerset Railway, a line with a tragic financial story too involved to be recounted here, and of little interest nowadays, created a new break of gauge at Radstock, where it joined the old Great Western mineral branch from Frome; so, until the latter was converted to narrow gauge in June 1874, the 23 miles between Bristol and Frome had of course to be worked in two distinct sections, the southern of which was not adapted for passenger traffic until the 5th July 1875.

=== Poor financial results ===
On 20 July 1874 the Somerset and Dorset Railway opened its Bath extension, passing through Radstock. Running through Midsomer Norton and Radstock from the south-west it crossed over the Bristol and North Somerset Railway (B&NSR) between the two places, paralleling the B&NSR through Radstock itself. There were thus two adjacent level crossings in the centre of the town. The Bath extension exhausted the Somerset and Dorset Railway Company financially, and it leased its line to the Midland Railway and the London and South Western Railway jointly on 13 July 1876, and became known as the Somerset and Dorset Joint Railway.

The opening of the line gave easy rail access to cheap Midlands coal which was now brought into the area. The Somerset coalfield had the limitation that the seams were narrow and had exceptionally high costs, which were now massively undercut. Miners' wages were reduced leading to industrial action, and local coal production declined. In addition deficient siding accommodation led to congestion in actually getting offered traffic away.

The company had assumed that the Great Western Railway (GWR) would route through goods traffic over its line, and the GWR did not rush to do this, preferring their own double track line via Bradford on Avon. The company sustained a loss of £5,600 in 1876.

The situation revived somewhat, and the former WS&WR section carried heavy volumes of coal, and was partly doubled in 1880. Easier coal seams were exploited and deep pits at Pensford and Dunkerton were sunk in the period 1901 – 1920, resulting in a 25% increase in the area's production.

For the entire life of the reconstructed Bristol and North Somerset Railway Company, money had been short and the line had been worked by the GWR. From time to time negotiations had been opened with a view to selling the line to the larger company, and these were repeatedly fruitless. The B&NSR had huge debts and was making a loss every year, and it is unlikely that the GWR would pay dearly to acquire it. The shareholders may have expected a sale price that would get them their money back; an unrealistic expectation that led them to reject an offer when the GWR made it in 1880, even though the directors recommended acceptance. Resentment against the GWR for supposedly excessive charges for working the line were also a factor.

The Earl of Warwick had long been owed £113,000 and in January 1882 judgment in his favour was given in the court. The B&NSR had no money to pay, and were put in receivership. (Note: But not bankruptcy.)

=== A hostile rival ===
A remarkable parliamentary bill was submitted for the 1883 session: a Bristol and South Western Junction Railway was to be created. Its route would leave Andover, on the London and South Western Railway (LSWR) main line and run via Amesbury and Westbury to Radstock, where it would join both the Somerset and Dorset Joint Railway and the Bristol and North Somerset line. The latter would be doubled, and a new central Bristol station would be built adjacent to the floating harbour, as well as a new central goods station at Lewins Mead. From a much more convenient Bristol station, the journey to London over this route and the LSWR was only 12 miles longer than by the Great Western Railway (GWR). The capital was to be £1,866,000.

Although the proposal had some popular support, all the directly affected parties opposed the scheme, and during its passage in Parliament it was considerably scaled down. However the preamble was shown not to be proved, and the bill failed. This had been a direct assault by the LSWR and its friends on the heartland of the GWR network, and if it had succeeded it could have tapped the GWR's core traffic at a number of locations; and in consequence the GWR started to think more defensively about its position. This seems to have pushed the GWR into granting better terms to purchase the B&NSR line, and the Bristol and North Somerset Railway was amalgamated with the GWR in July 1884; (Note: Warnock's date, confirmed by Carter; MacDermot says, on page 76 of volume II, that it was absorbed on 3 September 1874.) the WS&WR had been absorbed by the GWR in 1850, so that the entire line between Bristol and Frome via Radstock was in GWR control and was operated as a single unit.

== Features ==
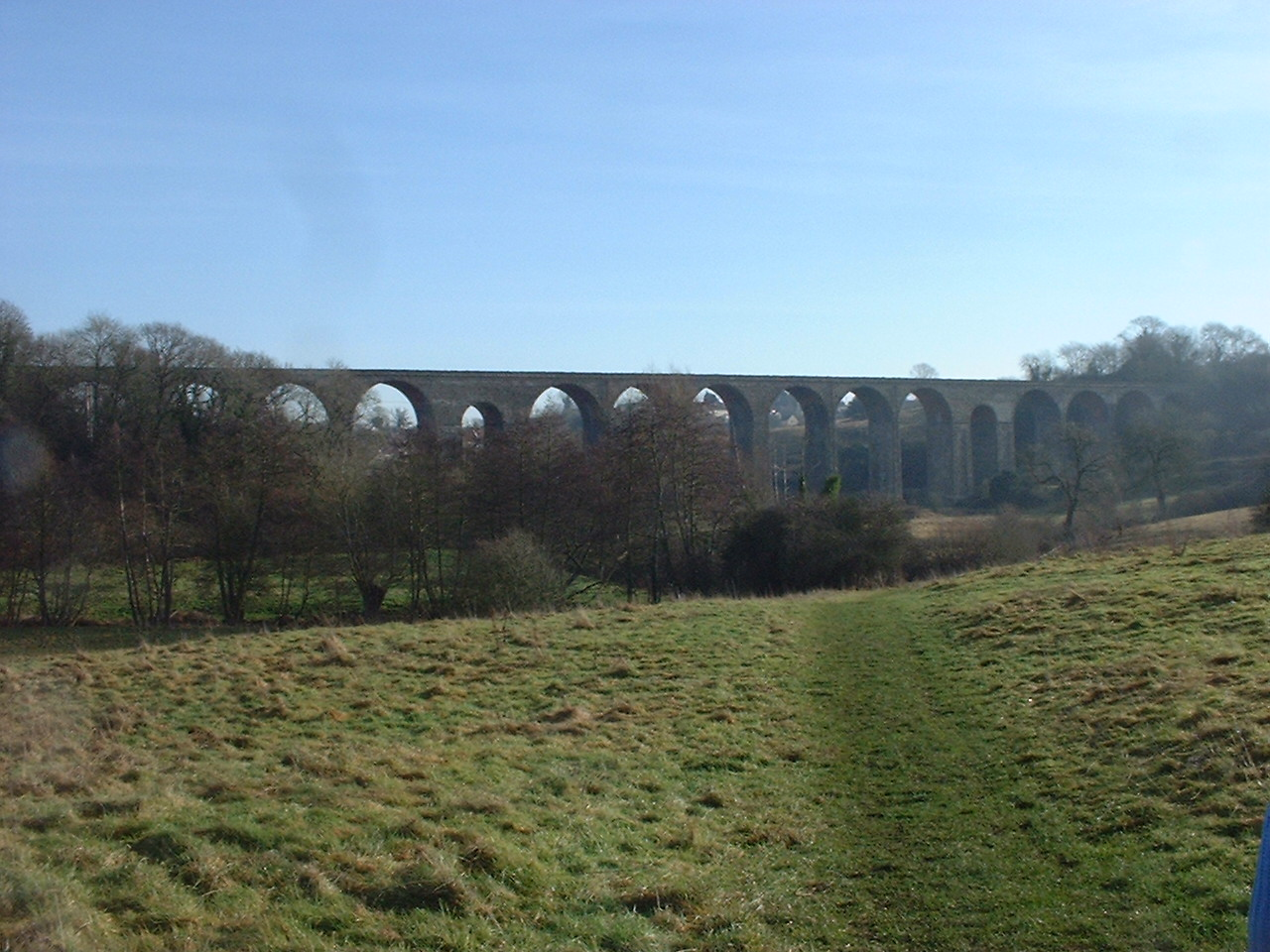
Pensford Viaduct

The original stations were in most cases built to a standard but distinctive design by the architect William Clarke, featuring large canopies and three tall chimneys.

The B&NSR was one of the railways carried on the Midford viaducts (see photograph above). This had three levels: the B&NSR traversed a river valley on a bridge which crossed by the Somerset and Dorset Joint Railway which crossed the line and the river valley on an almost perpendicular course on a viaduct.

The biggest civil engineering project on the line was the Pensford Viaduct over the River Chew. The viaduct is 995 feet (303 m) long, reaches a maximum height of 95 feet (29 m) to rail level and consists of sixteen arches and is now a Grade II listed structure.

Until 1966 there was no running connection between the North Somerset route and the Somerset and Dorset line; occasional wagon exchange took place through Ludlow Pit private siding; the owner charged 1s 0d per wagon exchanged in this way.

=== Topography ===
The line was single throughout.

The line left the Bristol to Bath main line at North Somerset Junction, a little east of Bristol Temple Meads station. An east curve was later built giving access towards Bath, in connection with the enhanced goods facilities at East Depot in 1892. This line trailed in at Marsh Junction, where the Bristol Relief line immediately diverged, towards Pylle Hill.

Passenger stations on the line were then:

- Brislington
- Whitchurch Halt, opened 1925
- Pensford
- Clutton
- Hallatrow; the Camerton line trailed in
- Farrington Gurney Halt, opened 1927
- Welton; renamed Welton and Midsomer Norton in 1898, and renamed Midsomer Norton and Welton in 1904
- Radstock; renamed Radstock West in 1949
- Mells Road

On the Camerton line from Hallatrow, the passenger stations were:

- Paulton Halt, opened 1914
- Radford and Timsbury Halt, opened 1910
- Camerton
- Dunkerton Colliery Halt, opened 1911
- Dunkerton
- Combe Hay Halt
- Midford Halt, opened 1911
- Monkton Combe, opened 1910

The line joined the Bathampton to Bradford on Avon line at Limpley Stoke.

The B&NSR main line was steeply graded; leaving Marsh Junction it climbed at 1 in 62 to Brislington station, continuing at 1 in 60 to Whitchurch, a single platform halt, continuing to climb to the bridge for the Norton Malreward road. The line then fell at 1 in 66 to Pensford, where there was a sixteen arch viaduct. The line then climbed again, passing Pensford Pit; reaching another summit it fell at 1 in 169, and then 1 in 71 towards Clutton, first passing sidings that accessed a siding serving Fry's Bottom Pit. The sidings at Clutton handled coal from Greyfield Pit.

The line now fell at 1 in 58 to Hallatrow, where the Camerton line trailed in. There was a short bay platform for Camerton branch passenger trains. Rising again, the line climbed at 1 in 65 and then fell again to Farrington Gurney Halt, where passengers obtained tickets at the Miner's Arms public house. Farrington Pit was alongside. Continuing to fall, the line reached Midsomer Norton and Welton passenger station and finally Radstock, later named Radstock West.

== Services ==
The passenger service was typical for a rural railway; in 1884 there were five passenger trains in each direction. By 1910, there were eight trains a day on Thursdays and Saturdays, fewer on other weekdays, and not all of those ran through to or from Frome.

On 28 December 1946 the dirt batch at Pensford Pit slipped, burying and blocking the line; it was closed there for three months, with passenger operation from Bristol to Pensford and from Clutton to Frome.

In the 1950s new and efficient bus services were introduced in the greater Bristol area; there had been good business from passengers travelling to work in Bristol, and the bus services hit passenger carryings on the line. In September 1958 the passenger service on the line was halved. Nonetheless, the line was stated to be losing £18,542 annually, and the last passenger train ran on 31 October 1959.

== Later events ==
The line crossed the Somerset and Dorset Joint Railway at Radstock, and when that line closed to all traffic on 6 March 1966, there was a need to continue to serve a colliery at Writhlington, a little east of Radstock. As the Bristol and North Somerset line was still open for mineral traffic, a connection between the two lines was formed at Radstock, and for a period Writhlington was served in that way.

Somerset coal continued to be transported to the Bristol area, although not in the former volumes, until the embankment near Pensford was washed out in the summer of 1968. It was considered uneconomic to reinstate it, but the former WS&WR line to Frome was intact, although it had been dormant since April 1966. Accordingly, the line to Frome was re-opened and Somerset coal ran to Bristol via Frome. The Bristol and North Somerset line was finally closed north of the washout site to Marsh Junction, Bristol.

Nonetheless, the coalfield was in terminal decline, and the last pit closed in 1973; the final revenue movement of coal on the line was on 16 November 1973. There was an independent wagon repair activity at Radstock, and that continued to be rail served for a time.

== The Camerton branch ==
Bristol and North Somerset Railway Act 1873
- Act of Parliament
- Parliament of the United Kingdom
- Long title: An Act to confer upon the Bristol and North Somerset Railway Company renewed powers for making a Branch Railway to Camerton, and power to divert the road leading from Pensford to Stanton Wick, and to confer certain powers on the Great Western Railway Company with respect to the said Branch Railway; and for other purposes.
- Citation: 36 & 37 Vict. c. clxviii

Dates
- Royal assent: 21 July 1873

Text of statute as originally enacted

The Camerton branch had been authorised by the original act of Parliament for the Bristol and North Somerset Railway, but not proceeded with by the impecunious company. Coal had been extracted for some time at Camerton – the Camerton New Colliery had been opened in 1800 – and in the 1873 session of Parliament the B&NSR received authority to build the branch; the Bristol and North Somerset Railway Act 1873 (36 & 37 Vict. c. clxviii) was passed on 21 July with capital of £40,000; the GWR was permitted to fund the construction. The development of this scheme for a relatively short branch line seems to have been ill-prepared. Only after the passage of the act of Parliament was Clarke, the company's engineer, told to prepare detailed estimates for the construction. At a board meeting on 30 June 1875 was it decided to start negotiations with the Somerset Coal Canal Company to get permission to cross its canal. On 24 October 1875 the GWR accepted a tender for the construction from W. Monsley in the sum of £19,000. Evidently the B&NSR had persuaded the GWR to handle the management of the work.

A railway three miles three furlongs eight chains and fifty links or thereabouts in length, commencing in the parish of High Littleton in the county of Somerset by a junction with the Company's main line there, and terminating in the parish of Camerton in the same county. — Section 4, Bristol and North Somerset Railway Act 1873 (36 & 37 Vict. c. clxviii)

In October 1880 and again on 21 May 1881 Major-General Hutchinson performed the formal inspection of the line and, with some comments, approved the line for opening. The construction had cost £42,214. It appears that the GWR had funded the construction on the basis of a promise of reimbursement by the B&NSR, for Vincent records that "a special meeting was held of the North Somerset's board of directors on 31 March 1882 which then allowed the company to raise the Camerton branch capital".

Although authorised for opening in 1881, no colliery company applied for a siding connection, and for a period the line remained in suspense. In fact it opened for passengers and goods and mineral traffic on 1 March 1882. The line was three miles long and very steeply graded, falling at 1 in 47 from Hallatrow, that is, against the loaded direction. Train loads were limited to fifteen wagons.

The opening of the branch hit the Somerset Coal Canal hard, and by 1898 it was derelict. In 1903 the GWR purchased the canal for £2,000, and extended the Camerton branch along the canal alignment to Limpley Stoke, there forming a junction with the GWR line from Bath to Trowbridge. The first section, about a mile in length from Camerton, reached Dunkerton Pit, and was opened on 26 August 1908, and the remainder on 9 May 1910. From that time most of the coal was routed via Freshford sidings.

A passenger service was operated on the Camerton branch from the time of opening as a through line; but despite serving mining communities, there was little business. Attempts to run an economic service with railmotors were made, but the passenger service was discontinued during the First World War, ceasing on 22 March 1915. It was restored in the summer of 1923 (on 9 July) as an experimental service, omitting Midford Halt, but was finally abandoned on 21 September 1925.

Goods services on the section from Hallatrow to Camerton ceased on the same day; the track was lifted on this section about 1930. Goods and mineral traffic continued, accessed at the Limpley Stoke end only, but that finally closed too on 15 February 1951 and the track was taken up in 1958.

=== The Titfield Thunderbolt ===
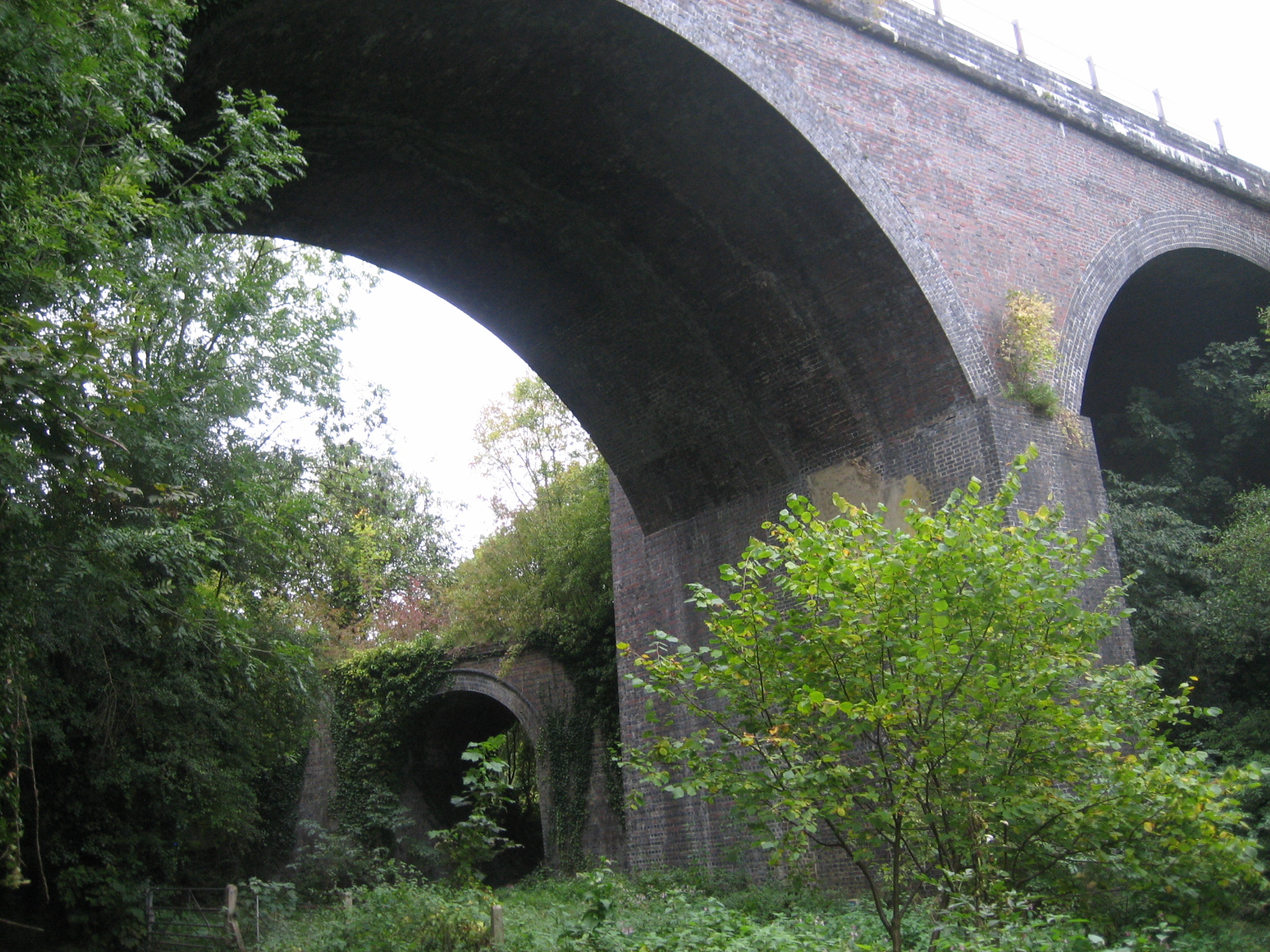
East-west beneath north–south: the Camerton branch viaduct (left) is dwarfed by the Somerset and Dorset Joint Railway viaduct at Midford

The Camerton line achieved some fame after closure. The Ealing Studios film, The Titfield Thunderbolt, was shot in 1952 using the line. The plot of the film involved a rural line being closed to passengers by British Railways, so local people club together and, against all the odds, run their own passenger service.

== Future potential reopening ==
Numerous proposals have been made to reopen the railway line in some form, most involving the still-existing branch line from Frome to Radstock. A consultation report produced by Halcrow Group in 2014 outlines the feasibility reinstating service on that branch which was estimated to cost £40 million in 2013. Furthermore, the possibility of opening a heritage railway line has been discussed. The former line through Bristol via Brislington and Whitchurch has been described by pressure group Transport for Greater Bristol as 'technically feasible' but would require a large land acquisition budget due to most of the old route being built over.

In January 2019, Campaign for Better Transport released a report identifying the line from Frome to Radstock as Priority 2 for reopening. Priority 2 is for those lines which require further development or a change in circumstances (such as housing developments).
