= Wool railway station =

Railway station in Dorset, England

Wool
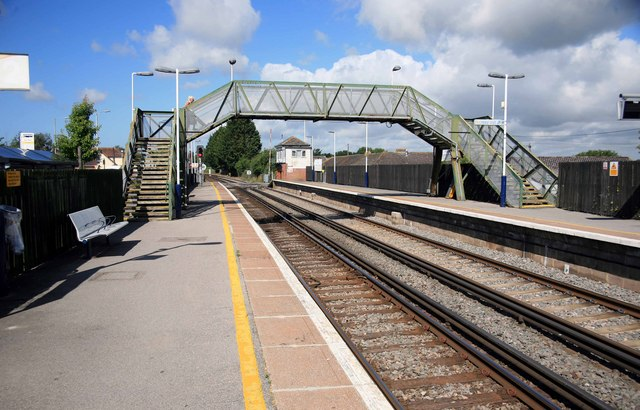

General information
- Location: Wool, Dorset; England
- Coordinates: 50.682°N 2.221°W
- Grid reference: SY845869
- Managed by: South Western Railway
- Platforms: 2

Other information
- Station code: WOO
- Classification: DfT category E

History
- Original company: Southampton and Dorchester Railway
- Pre-grouping: London and South Western Railway
- Post-grouping: Southern Railway

Key dates
- 1 June 1847: Station opened

Passengers
- 2020/21: ▼45,784
- 2021/22: ▲0.127 million
- 2022/23: ▲0.161 million
- 2023/24: ▲0.189 million
- 2024/25: ▲0.209 million
Location
Notes
- Passenger statistics from the Office of Rail and Road

Wool railway station serves the village of Wool in Dorset, England. It is on the South West Main Line, 125 miles 69 chains (202.6 km) down the line from London Waterloo. South Western Railway manages the station and operates all services.

== History ==
When the Southampton and Dorchester Railway (S&DR) was opened on 1 June 1847, Wool was one of the original stations on the line. The S&DR was amalgamated into the London and South Western Railway (LSWR) on 11 October 1848, and that company doubled the line in stages: the section from Wimborne to Wool was doubled on 1 June 1863, and the double track was extended from Wool to Dorchester on 1 August 1863.

The station was host to a Southern Railway camping coach from 1936 to 1939.

Two camping coaches were positioned here by the Southern Region from 1954 to 1960, the coaches were replaced in 1961 by two Pullman camping coaches until 1967. The coaches were fitted with a full kitchen, two sleeping compartments and a room with two single beds.

=== Accidents and incidents ===
The line was originally built with a single track but no telegraph, with the result that there was a head-on collision between Wool and Wareham on 27 September 1847; casualties were light.

== Services ==
Until 1967, trains through the station were normally steam hauled. Between 1967 and 1988, passenger services were normally provided by Class 33/1 diesel locomotives with Class 438 coaching stock (also known as 4-TC units). The line was electrified in 1988, using the standard British Rail Southern Region direct current third rail at 750 volts. Class 442 electric multiple units were initially used following electrification, until being displaced by new Class 444 electric multiple units in 2007.

There is a basic hourly service in each direction throughout the week, however peak times two trains an hour call in each direction on weekdays.

== Bus services ==
The station also has 4 bus services linking it to Weymouth & Swanage.

=== Purbeck Breezer ===
- 30: Swanage - Weymouth / Dorchester (Limited Service)
- 31: Wool Rail Station - Lulworth Cove & Durdle Door

=== First Wessex ===
- X54: Poole - Weymouth via Lulworth Cove
- X52: Bridport - Bovington via Weymouth

Preceding station	National Rail	Following station
Wareham	South Western Railway; South West Main Line	Moreton
