= Moreton railway station =

Moreton railway station may refer to two railway stations in England:

- Moreton railway station (Dorset)
- Moreton railway station (Merseyside)

== See also ==
- Moreton-in-Marsh railway station
