= Beaulieu railway station =

Beaulieu station may refer to:

- Beaulieu Park railway station, a railway station in Chelmsford, Essex
- Beaulieu Road railway station, a railway station in the New Forest, Hampshire
- Beauly railway station, a railway station in the Highland council area of Scotland
