= Southampton West End railway station =

Disused railway station in Southampton, Hampshire

Southampton West End
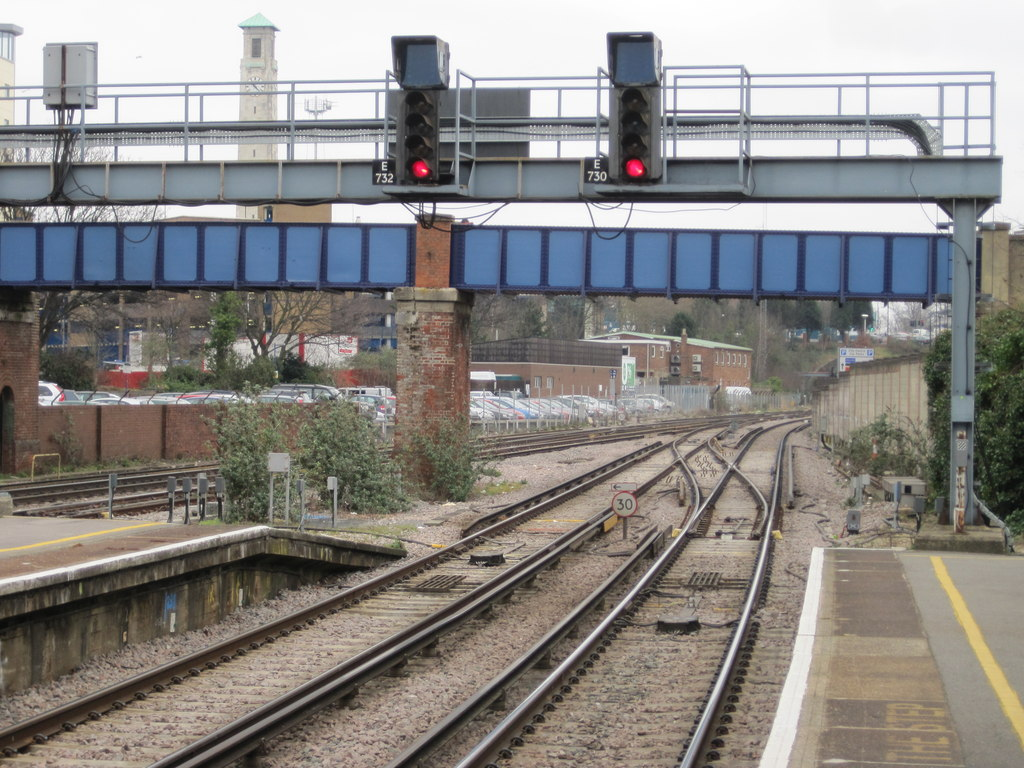
- The site of the station in 2012

General information
- Location: Southampton, Hampshire; England
- Coordinates: 50.9076°N 1.4119°W
- Grid reference: SU414122
- Platforms: 2

Other information
- Status: Disused

History
- Original company: LSWR

Key dates
- 1 June 1847: Opened as Blechynden
- July 1858: Renamed Southampton West End
- 1 November 1895: Closed
Location

Southampton West End served the city of Southampton, Hampshire, England, from 1847 to 1895 on the Southampton and Dorchester Railway (now part of the South West Main Line).

== History ==
The station was opened on 1 June 1847 by the London and South Western Railway Company. The new line connected to the existing Southampton station (later named Southampton Terminus) and Southampton Tunnel was built to take it under the centre of the city. The Southampton and Dorchester Railway Act 1845 (8 & 9 Vict. c. xciii) authorising the line required a station to be built at Blechynden Terrace, near the west end of the tunnel, but at first this was omitted due to a legal dispute. However, construction difficulties in the tunnel, including a partial collapse in May 1847, led to the building of a temporary terminus at the Blechynden site. With the tunnel closed, locomotives to be used on the new line were transported by road through the city, and passengers were conveyed across the town by horse-drawn omnibuses.

A test run through the tunnel was made by a steam engine on 29 July 1847 and the line was fully open from 6 August.

In August 1858, Blechynden station was renamed Southampton West End.

By the end of 1860, the station had a booking office and two waiting rooms on the up and down platforms. In the late 1880s the station was inadequate for its traffic, so land was bought for a new station nearby and Southampton West (now Central) station was opened on 1 November 1895, while Southampton West End closed to passengers. The date that it was closed completely is unknown; parts of the platforms and buildings, shown to the east of the new station on an Ordnance Survey map published in 1898, remained standing into the 1930s.

Preceding station	Historical railways	Following station
Southampton Terminus or St Denys	LSWR; Southampton & Dorchester	Millbrook
