= Southampton and Dorchester Railway =

Former railway company in southern England

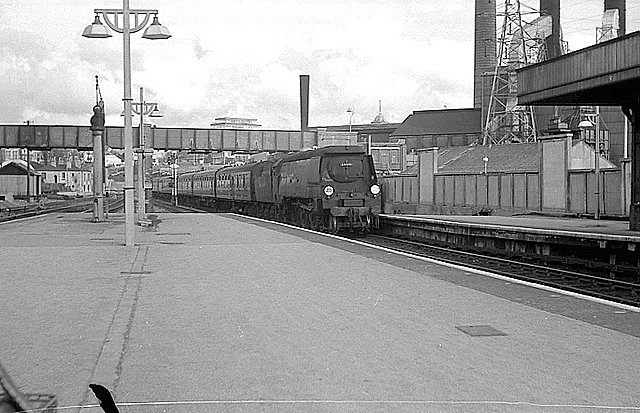
Southampton Central station (1963)

The Southampton and Dorchester Railway was an English railway company formed to join Southampton in Hampshire with Dorchester in Dorset, with hopes of forming part of a route from London to Exeter. It received parliamentary authority in 1845 and opened in 1847.

It was promoted by Charles Castleman of Wimborne Minster and became known as "Castleman's Corkscrew" because of the meandering route it followed.

Its route across the New Forest was determined by the requirements of the Commissioners of the Forest. West of Brockenhurst, it ran via Ringwood; at that time Bournemouth was not considered an important settlement and Poole was served by a branch to Lower Hamworthy, across a toll bridge from the town.

In the late 19th century, a shorter route, via Christchurch and Bournemouth, was built and the former main line between Lymington Junction and Hamworthy Junction was reduced to the status of a local branch line, finally closing in the 1960s. However the end sections, from Southampton to Lymington Junction and from Hamworthy Junction to Dorchester, remain operational and form part of the important South West Main Line.

== Origins ==
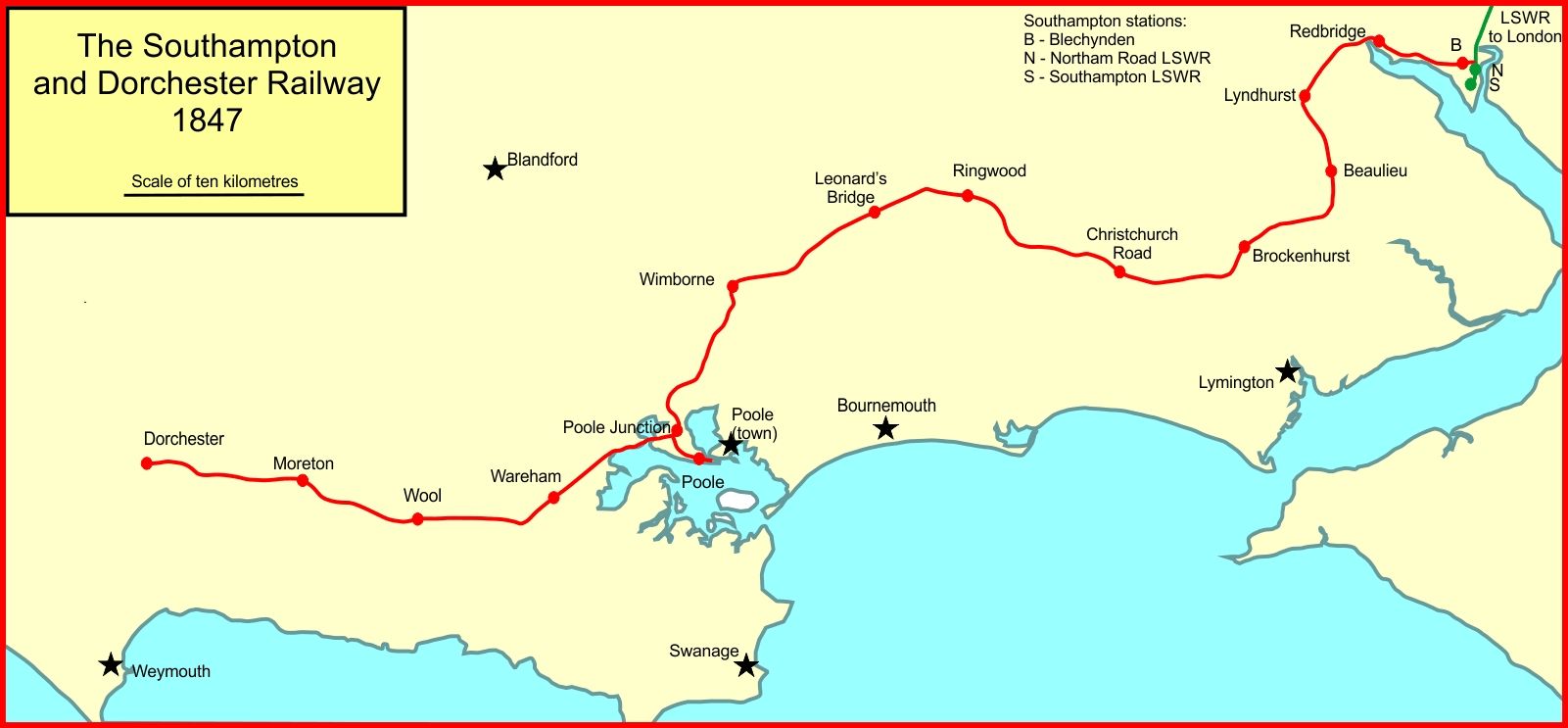
The Southampton and Dorchester Railway in 1847

The London and Southampton Railway had been promoted with the intention of enabling a connection between the docks at Southampton and the capital. Sensing the opportunity to serve a wider area of the south coast, that company changed its name to the London and South Western Railway (LSWR) in 1839, and the Southampton main line was opened by the LSWR on 11 May 1840.

The LSWR wished to expand its network towards Exeter, but had early on been frustrated by the success of the Great Western Railway (GWR) and its ally, the Bristol and Exeter Railway (B&ER) in extending into the region. Proposals were put forward as early as 1836, but it was not until 1847 that the company connected Salisbury in to its network, and that was a branch from Bishopstoke (Eastleigh), giving a circuitous route from London.

Before that, in 1844, Charles Castleman, a solicitor prominent in Wimborne Minster, had independently proposed a westward line from Southampton via Ringwood to Dorchester, and possibly on via Bridport to Exeter from there. Many railway schemes had been improbable in conception and Castleman went to some trouble to ensure a practicable and worthwhile scheme; Captain William Moorsom, an experienced railway engineer, was appointed by Castleman's committee of "respected local persons" to survey a route.

=== Moorsom's route ===
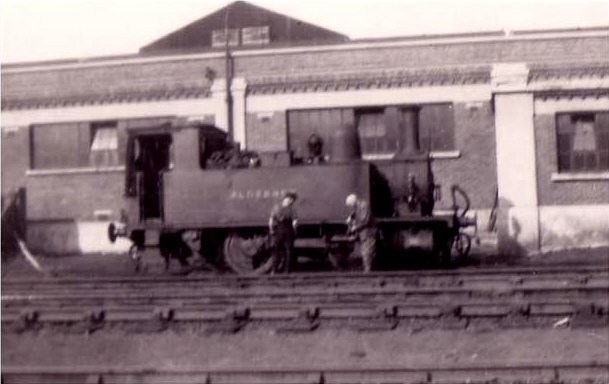
Tank Engine Alderney at Southampton Docks, 1947

He presented his report on 18 July 1844; his line would leave Southampton and run through Brockenhurst, Ringwood and Wimborne, then turning south to Poole and west again to Wareham and Dorchester. This alignment was far from direct, later earning the line the epithet "the Corkscrew", but Moorsom was confident that his line was cheaper and served more intermediate settlements than a direct line via the undeveloped heathlands around Poole. Interests in Weymouth were dismayed that the line was to end (for the time being) in Dorchester; they were anticipating the loss of Channel Islands packet traffic (post and the transport of official documents by sea) to Southampton. Moorsom said that the difficult terrain made an approach to Weymouth expensive; atmospheric traction had been considered, but not taken further.

At a public meeting on 19 July 1844 Moorsom's proposed route was accepted, and the Weymouth interest was appeased for the time being by a statement of intent to eventually reach their town, and the possible renaming of the line the Southampton and Dorsetshire Railway; the renaming did not last long.

=== Finding an ally ===
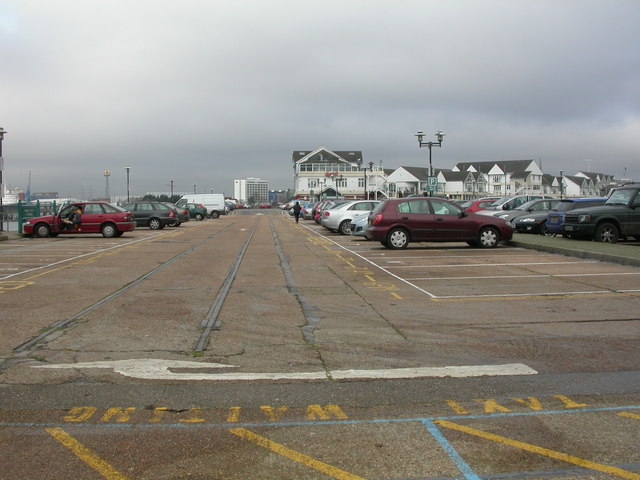
Southampton Docks, Town Quay, redundant railway lines, once a branch of the Southampton and Dorchester Railway

Castleman realised that he needed the support of a larger company, and the LSWR was the obvious choice, as it would bring London traffic to them at Southampton, and enable them to extend to Exeter. He approached the LSWR with the idea but was rebuffed; evidently they wished to concentrate on reaching Exeter through Salisbury, and they hinted at branches from such a line into Dorset. In the ensuing controversy, Castleman's route became known as "the Coastal Route" to Exeter, and the route via Salisbury "the Central Route". Castleman realised that it was unlikely that both routes would be built, and he pressed the LSWR for undertakings not to develop the Central Route; the larger company again rebuffed him and declined further discussion.

Castleman now took the bold step of offering his line to the rival Great Western Railway, in a letter dated 30 July 1844. Referring to the LSWR he said

... An act, however, of undoubted duplicity on their part, makes me fearful to trust them as they have a scheme of their own for supplying the County of Dorset by means of a line from Salisbury ...

He went on to suggest that the Central Route would abstract traffic from the GWR while his Coastal Route, built on the broad gauge and allied to them, would capture a large tract of territory for them. The GWR agreed to discuss the matter, and after some weeks, a lease of the future line was signed by them.

Throughout its early existence, the LSWR had been at pains to secure territory in which it might be the dominant, or only, railway company, and the gauge of the track with which a new line was to be built determined its alliance with the broad gauge interests (the GWR, the B&ER and other associated companies) or railways with the standard gauge of 4 ft 8 1/2 in (1,435 mm). (In this context the latter were usually referred to as "narrow-gauge" railways, and the competitive battles to ensure that new lines were specified to be built to the preferred gauge were referred to as the Gauge War.)

The LSWR were therefore alarmed at this development, as it would bring broad gauge trains into Southampton Docks, the heart of territory the LSWR considered its own, and immediately promoted a rival scheme to reach Wimborne and Dorchester from Salisbury, which it had not yet reached. Opinion in local communities largely favoured the Southampton and Dorchester proposals, seeing the LSWR for the obstructive tactic that it was, and welcoming the competition that GWR alliance would bring to an area dominated by the LSWR. Moreover, Weymouth would get its connection, through the broad gauge Wilts, Somerset and Weymouth Railway now being promoted via Dorchester; and some favoured a coastal line for its usefulness in defensive troop movements in the event of an attack by France. The major disadvantage was that there would be a break of gauge at Southampton for passengers and goods travelling between Dorset and London.

=== The parliamentary bill ===
Castleman was encouraged now, and Moorsom quickly completed the necessary plans of the route; the GWR guaranteed a 3.5% dividend on S&DR shareholdings, and a bill was presented to Parliament for the 1845 session.

There were 248 railway bills that session, and a Board of Trade Commission, the Railway Board, informally referred to as "the Five Kings", was appointed to determine the relative merits of these schemes and numerous other potentially penetrating routes. At this period it was considered that only one route in any area was supportable, and therefore the Railway Board would choose which. The Five Kings found in favour of certain GWR routes and also the Southampton and Dorchester Railway, and against the LSWR's Central Route. This report was published on 31 December 1844, not mentioning the break of gauge. Shortly afterwards, however the Railway Board recommended that the S&DR line should be leased not to the GWR, but to the LSWR. At a stroke, the fortunes of the GWR and LSWR were reversed, and Castleman had got what he originally wanted.

Lord Dalhousie, the chairman of the Railway Board, encouraged the LSWR, the GWR and Castleman to come to a territorial agreement: there was to be no encroachment into the others' territory without informing each other and the Board of Trade. The GWR lease of the S&DR was transferred to the LSWR.

There was still work to do before going to Parliament, and Moorsom had to defend his planned route. Castleman had given a personal undertaking that the route within Southampton would be on the foreshore, across the mudlands, and would probably have much improved trade in the lower town, but the LSWR were now in control. Castleman's preferred alignment would have enabled the reclamation of a considerable area of useless tidal mud. However the Pier Commissioners demanded the use of horses, and not locomotives, throughout the quays at Southampton, and the LSWR refused to give any such undertaking, and decided upon an alternative route that ran on the landward side of the town and would require a tunnel.

=== An act secured ===
Southampton and Dorchester Railway Act 1845
- Act of Parliament
- Parliament of the United Kingdom
- Long title: An Act for making a Railway from Southampton to Dorchester, with a Branch to the Town of Poole.
- Citation: 8 & 9 Vict. c. xciii

Dates
- Royal assent: 21 July 1845

Accordingly, the Southampton and Dorchester Railway got its act of Parliament, the Southampton and Dorchester Railway Act 1845 (8 & 9 Vict. c. xciii), on 21 July 1845, with authorised capital of £500,000. The lease to the LSWR was authorised in the act. A branch from Hamworthy to the ballast quay at Poole was also authorised, and the broad gauge Wilts, Somerset and Weymouth Railway (authorised in the same session of Parliament) could be required to lay narrow gauge rails to give LSWR trains access to Weymouth.

The line was to start from a junction near the LSWR Southampton station (later Southampton Terminus) and curve west through a tunnel; at this point the Act required a station to be built at Blechynden Terrace; (Note: Some references (Williams, Butt) give the spelling Bletchynden; this seems to be a mistake: Blechynden is given by Cox, writing for the City of Southampton; by Bradshaw 1850 (facsimile edition from Middleton Press); and street names from near-contemporary Ordnance Survey maps; and it is referred to as "the Blechynden Terrace station" in Southampton Borough Council minutes (page 160 in Patterson).) this became the present-day Southampton station. From there the line was to run westerly, crossing the River Test at Eling, and then run south-west to Brockenhurst. The Commissioners of Woods and Forests intervened in the alignment of the route through the New Forest, and the intended route through Lyndhurst was not permitted, the line instead making a southward sweep near there. From Brockenhurst the line was to run westward through Ringwood and Wimborne, trending southwest through Broadstone and Wareham, and then west to Dorchester.

The line was planned as part of a through route to Exeter via Bridport and Axminster, and the Dorchester terminus was aligned so as to enable this. The Poole Ballast Quay was at the eastern extremity of the spit of land south of the channel between Holes Bay and Poole Harbour.

=== Disagreements with the LSWR ===
Although the LSWR had leased the line, the powers to build it rested with Castleman and his colleagues. An early question was whether to build the line as double track; Castleman argued that building as single and doubling later would cost much more, but the LSWR disagreed. Next the LSWR supported a London, Salisbury and Yeovil Railway and a scheme for an Exeter, Yeovil and Dorchester Railway. In retaliation the GWR sponsored an Exeter Great Western Railway. The support given to these schemes was in direct disregard of undertakings mutually given at Dalhousie's suggestion (see above), and the Southampton and Dorchester directors saw that their supposed protector was improperly sponsoring a line that would abstract from their own. Acrimonious personal accusations were made and some were published, and at a twice-yearly meeting of the S&DR the grievances were aired; the outcome was that the LSWR forced another four of their own nominee directors—they already had four out of twelve—on to the S&DR board; with by far the largest block of shares they were easily able to do this.

Castleman was evidently furious and after further exchanges during the meeting he resigned. He was later persuaded to resume his duties as solicitor to the company, but the LSWR was now in total control.

=== New Forest ===
The act had left the route through the New Forest to be approved by the Commissioners of Woods and Forests, and they did not approve Moorsom's route. This proved contentious and at length I. K. Brunel was brought in to propose a compromise. It was not until July 1846 that agreement was made; by then the contractor Morton Peto had completed the Ringwood to Dorchester section by the previous November.

=== Opening at last ===
The railway was completed and opening was being planned for 1 June 1847; but on 2 May 1847 there was a collapse of the newly constructed railway tunnel at Southampton. The damage extended about 100 yards (90 m) and opened to the surface near the western end of the tunnel; it was caused by disturbance to the ground created around the route of the old Southampton and Salisbury Canal tunnel through which the new tunnel had cut. This was quickly restored, and on 20 May Captain Coddington conducted the formal inspection of the route, which continued the next day. He was satisfied with the standard of workmanship of the line, but commented adversely on the narrow opening of the overbridges, and the fact that the entire line west of Redbridge was single: the longest such length in England, he thought. He also criticised the sharp curve at Northam where the line joined the existing LSWR route; the company agreed to alter the curve to a larger radius. The public opening was planned for 1 June, but on 30 May the interior of the Southampton tunnel suffered further problems, with a large bulge in the walls indicating a section was sinking. With no connection to the mainline to London, the Blechynden terrace station was the terminus; the LSWR had to transport their locomotives there by road through the streets of Southampton. The Poole branch (to Lower Hamworthy) opened at the same time.

The tunnel was eventually opened in August 1847 after remedial works, Captain Coddington having returned and reported:

About 50 or 60 years ago a Tunnel was constructed for canal purposes which proved a failure and was abandoned, I enquired what precautions had been taken at the crossing, and was informed that the old Tunnel had been completely taken out, and that in addition a length of twenty feet of the old tunnel on either side of the new one had been built solid with rubble masonry.

It appears that Mr Peto the contractor, for the accommodation of those parties whose property lies above the line of the old Tunnel, agreed to strengthen it by building a certain number of cross walls at short intervals. The mode adopted in doing it was to drive a small gallery laterally from the side of the new Tunnel to reach the old one at a point some distance beyond the 20 feet which had been solidly built up. Through this gallery the materials were introduced and 3, 4 or more cross walls about 10 feet apart were built within it.

The old tunnel having been on a level and open at its extremities whatever percolation of water entered it either from the sides or above flowed out at both ends. The crossing of the new tunnel in no way affected this drainage, but by the filling up solid of a portion of it, leaving a hollow interval, the accumulation of water in seeking an egress has entered into, saturated the soil on which the new Tunnel stands, and it is now incapable of supporting its weight.

== After opening day ==
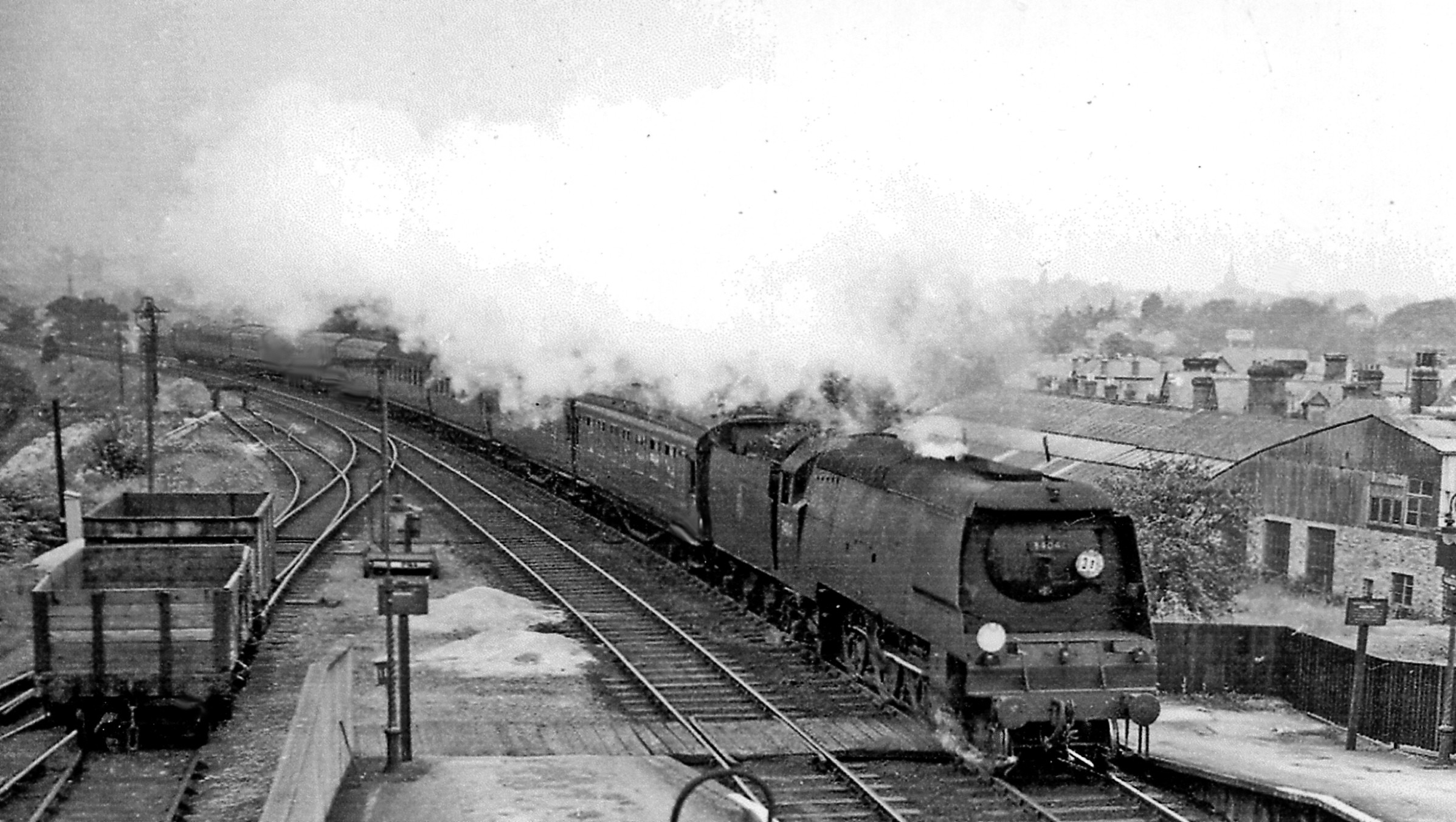
Dorchester – Waterloo express at Parkstone (1958)

The Blechynden station was a temporary one because of a legal dispute; a permanent structure a little to the west came into use in 1850, later being renamed Southampton West. The section of line from Blechynden to the LSWR terminus only opened for traffic from the night of 5–6 August 1847, although there were passengers on a test train which ran on 29 July 1847.

There was a serious collision on 20 September 1847, near Wool; the mail train from Dorchester was very late in reaching Wareham, and the stationmaster there sent a pilot engine out on the single line to find out what was wrong. At a point on the line where forward visibility was limited on a curve, there was a collision "of a fearful character". There were apparently only two passengers in the train, and they escaped without injury, but "considerable damage is done to both engines, and several carriages are said to be shattered".

The LSWR was embarrassed by the public criticism of the lack of an electric telegraph system, and installed it "by the end of the year".

The stations at opening were:

- Blechynden, sometimes referred to as "the Blechynden Terrace station" in contrast to the LSWR terminus;
- Redbridge
- Lyndhurst, sometimes known as Ashurst at first;
- Beaulieu, or Beaulieu Road;
- Brockenhurst;
- Christchurch Road, sometimes known as Ossemley Ford or Osmondly Ford;
- Ringwood;
- Leonards Bridge; a rudimentary stopping place at a passing loop; probably discontinued during 1847 or 1848;
- Wimborne;
- Poole Junction;
- Poole; the terminal on the branch, on the south side of the inlet; there was a toll bridge to the town, the original Poole Bridge had been opened in 1834;
- Wareham;
- Wool;
- Moreton;
- Dorchester.

The Dorchester station was aligned for extension towards Bridport and Exeter, but its location was probably chosen to enable a joint station with the Wilts, Somerset and Weymouth Railway, with which the Southampton and Dorchester was friendly at the time of planning the route.

In the short independent life of the Southampton and Dorchester Railway there was no change to the number of stations or their location, although Leonards Bridge may not have survived long.

In November 1846 the company applied for statutory powers for an ambitious group of extensions: a short branch to Eling, an industrial centre on an inlet from Southampton Water, and branches to Lymington, Blandford, and a line to Weymouth independent of the WS&WR. The act of Parliament obtained royal assent in July 1847, but the financial collapse following the Railway Mania resulted in money becoming impossible to obtain. Only the short Eling line (usually referred to as "the Eling Tramway") was built, opening probably in April 1851.

== Amalgamation with the LSWR ==
London and South Western and Southampton and Dorchester Railways Amalgamation Act 1848
- Act of Parliament
- Parliament of the United Kingdom
- Long title: An Act for amalgamating the Southampton and Dorchester Railway Company with the London and South-Western Railway Company.
- Citation: 11 & 12 Vict. c. lxxxix

Dates
- Royal assent: 22 July 1848

Text of statute as originally enacted

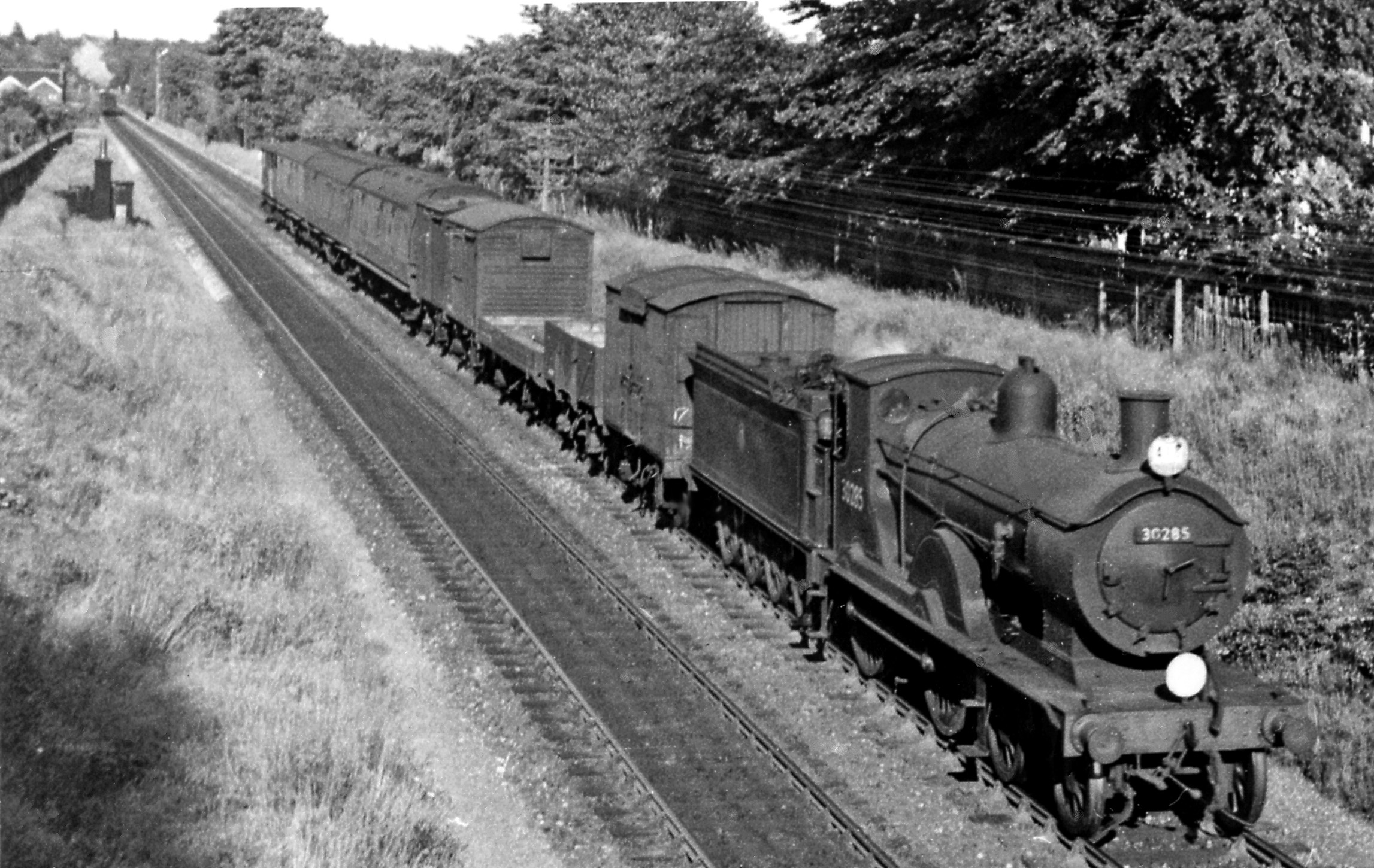
Down parcels train approaching Branksome station (1951)

The Southampton and Dorchester line was worked from the outset by the larger LSWR, and was closely bound to it. Amalgamation was an obvious next step, proposed in 1846 and authorised on 22 July 1848 by the London and South Western and Southampton and Dorchester Railways Amalgamation Act 1848 (11 & 12 Vict. c. lxxxix), taking effect on 11 October 1848. Southampton and Dorchester shareholders received LSWR shares one to one. John Mills joined the LSWR board, but Castleman did not do so until 1855, becoming chairman of the LSWR from 1873 to 1875.

== Part of the LSWR ==
There were several major alterations of the original line after the change of ownership:

=== Weymouth over the rival line ===
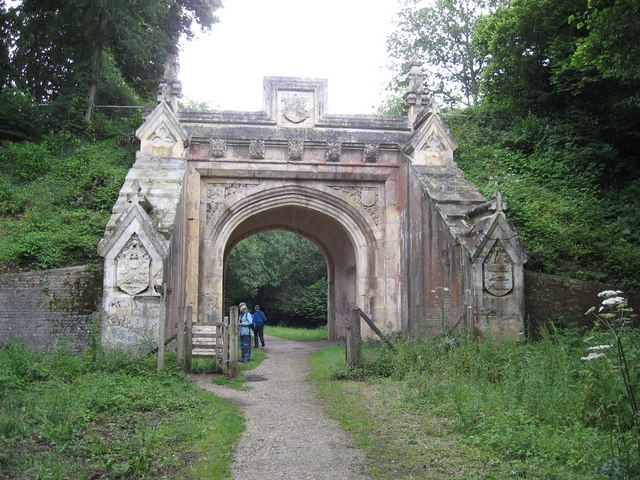
Lady Wimborne Bridge was built to carry the Southampton & Dorchester Railway over the main drive to Canford House. The railway closed 3 May 1977

The Wilts, Somerset and Weymouth Railway (WS&WR) opened to Weymouth on 20 January 1857, and according to the terms of the original Acts, they had laid narrow gauge rails, so that LSWR trains could run to Weymouth. They had a separate station at Dorchester, and a sharply curved, single-line connection between the LSWR line and the WS&WR line was built, the boundary being at the midpoint. The curve diverged from the LSWR line a short distance east of their Dorchester station, so that down LSWR trains ran into the terminal platforms; they then reversed to east of the junction, and proceeded forward towards Weymouth. Up LSWR trains passed the point of junction and then reversed into the terminal platform.

The connection was doubled in 1878, and in 1880 a platform was provided on the curve for down trains; they could now run through normally, but up trains continued the reversing movement. This was perpetuated until a through up platform on the curve was provided as part of the Bournemouth Line electrification in 1967, which provided enhanced non-electrified services to Weymouth.

=== Double track ===
The Southampton and Dorchester line was doubled in stages by the LSWR: from Southampton to Redbridge was double from the beginning, and from Redbridge to Wimborne was doubled by 1 September 1858, and following pressure from the Board of Trade, the remainder to Dorchester was doubled by 1 August 1863.

=== Southampton improvements ===
Trains from London to Dorchester had to enter the Southampton Terminus station of the original London and Southampton Railway, reversing to continue towards Dorchester. A curve was constructed enabling through running, opening to passengers on 2 August 1858, and on the same day Blechynden station was renamed Southampton West (or West End).

=== Bournemouth and Christchurch ===
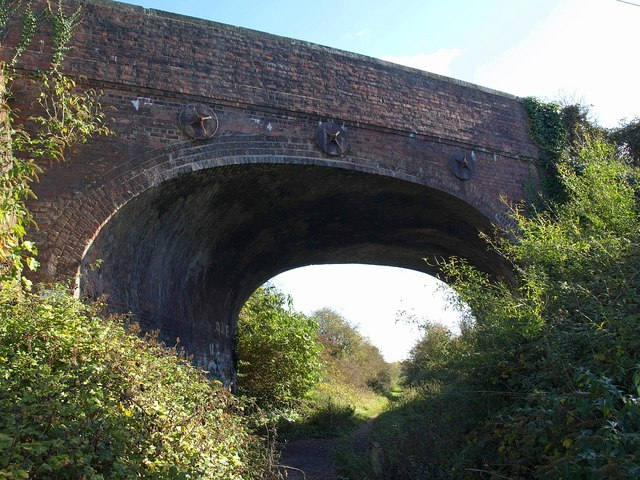
Bridge across former railway line, Ringwood

When the Southampton and Dorchester line had been conceived, Bournemouth was an insignificant hamlet surrounded by barren and hilly heathland, and there was no reason to make a railway connection. The market town of Christchurch was served by stagecoach from the station at Christchurch Road. As sea bathing, and seaside holidays, developed, Bournemouth grew considerably. The town was reached by the opening of the Ringwood, Christchurch and Bournemouth Railway which opened a branch to the town from Ringwood on 14 March 1870. The route was still circuitous, and was a branch off the main line, so that many express passenger trains divided at Brockenhurst, with separate portions for Weymouth via Wimborne and Bournemouth via Christchurch.

It was not until 5 March 1888 that the LSWR opened the Sway line, running direct from Lymington Junction (near Brockenhurst) to the RC&BR at Christchurch, and the connecting line through Bournemouth and Poole. The Ringwood route was now relegated to rural branch line status, although occasional through passenger trains took the route on summer Saturdays in the twentieth century.

=== Poole ===
The town of Poole had a station on the south side of the Quay Channel, and road access to Poole itself was over a toll bridge. The branch line to this Poole station made an east-facing junction with the main line at what is now Hamworthy station, then called Poole Junction. The branch seems to have extended eastwards from Poole station to a "Ballast Quay" at the eastern extremity of the headland.

From 1 November 1860 the Dorset Central Railway opened its line from Wimborne to Blandford. Their engines were serviced there, and LSWR engines took their goods wagons onwards to Poole. Moreover, as the price for the Dorset Central dropping a proposal to extend its own line into Poole, the LSWR was obliged to take Dorset Central through passenger coaches to Poole from Wimborne. In 1863, the Dorset Central merged with the Somerset Central Railway to form the Somerset and Dorset Railway.

On 2 December 1872 the LSWR opened a new connecting line from what became Broadstone station via the eastern side of Holes Bay to a new Poole station in the town itself, which connected end-on with the LSWR's new direct line through Bournemouth. The later Broadstone station was called New Poole Junction at first, in contrast to Poole Junction, which was renamed Hamworthy Junction on the same day. The old Poole station was renamed Hamworthy, and continued in passenger service until 1 July 1896 when it was reduced to goods-only status.

New Poole Junction was renamed Poole Junction in January 1875, and after further renamings became Broadstone. Passengers from Poole to Dorchester had to change trains at Broadstone until the Holes Bay line (from Poole to Hamworthy Junction) opened in 1893.

=== Stations after amalgamation ===
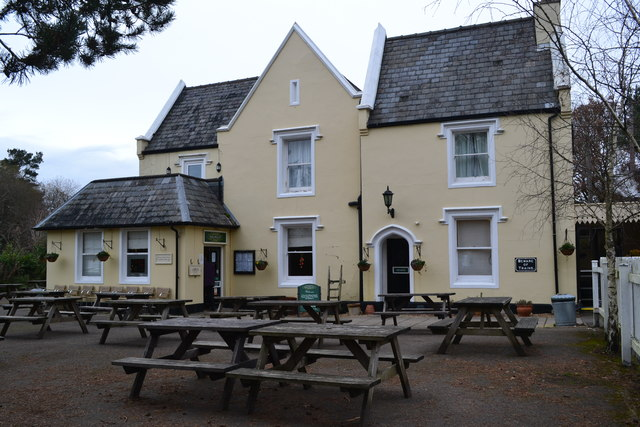
Former railway station house, Holmsley

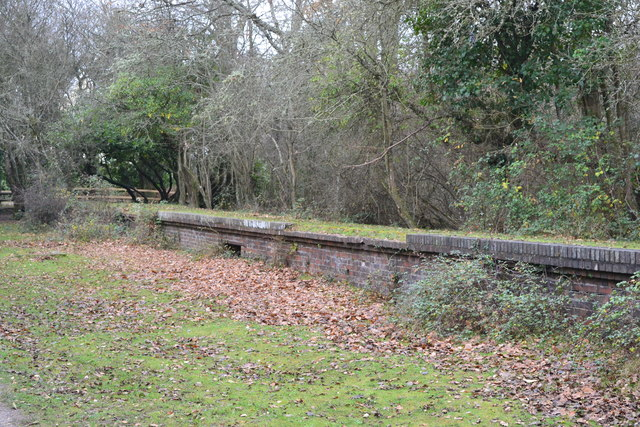
Former railway station platform, Holmsley

The stations on the route have experienced some changes:

- The original Blechynden station was replaced by a new station, called Southampton West (sometimes Southampton West End), a short distance to the west, in July 1858. The station had two through lines, and was extended on 1 November 1892. It was much extended again with the provision of four through lines, opening as Southampton Central on 7 July 1935, and the line was quadrupled from the station to Millbrook. The suffix Central was dropped from 10 July 1967, but was reinstated on 29 May 1994.
- Millbrook station was opened as Southampton Millbrook on 1 November 1861, and renamed Millbrook (Hants) on 1 May 1980.
- A station was opened at Eling Junction in 1859, and was renamed Totton (sometimes Totton for Eling) later the same year. The junction for Eling and the signalbox called Eling Junction had been open for several years, and has led a website to assert erroneously that the station had opened in 1847.
- Lyndhurst Road station was renamed Ashurst (New Forest) in June 1997.
- Beaulieu Road (sometimes referred to simply as Beaulieu in the early years).
- Brockenhurst. The Lymington branch line, opened on 12 July 1858, diverges from the main line at a new Lymington Junction, a little west of Brockenhurst, which became the junction station for the branch, and was called Brockenhurst Junction between 1876 and 1888. On opening of the Sway line on 5 March 1858, Lymington Junction, and Brockenhurst as the junction passenger station, became more important still. Brockenhurst station was extended in 1936.
- Christchurch Road was renamed Holmsley from 14 November 1862. The station building was impressive, no doubt reflecting the importance of Christchurch rather than Holmsley, and survives today as a tea room.
- Ringwood.
- Ashley Heath Halt was opened on 1 April 1927.
- West Moors was opened on 1 August 1867; it was the station at which the Salisbury line of the friendly Salisbury and Dorset Junction Railway converged.
- Wimborne. From 1 November 1860 the Dorset Central Railway joined here. Their engines were serviced at Wimborne, and LSWR engines took their goods wagons on to Poole. Moreover, as the price for the Dorset Central dropping a proposal to extend its own line to Poole, the LSWR was obliged to take Dorset Central through passenger coaches to Poole from Wimborne.
- Broadstone; originally called New Poole Junction, opening on 2 December 1872; it was renamed Poole Junction in January 1875; then Poole Junction and Broadstone from July 1883; then Broadstone and New Poole Junction from January 1887; Broadstone Junction from February 1889; and Broadstone on 7 July 1929. The station had four through platform lines, reflecting its importance as an interchange station.
- Poole; the terminal on the branch, on the south side of the inlet; there was a toll bridge to the town; Poole Bridge had been opened in 1834; Poole was renamed Hamworthy on 2 December 1872 when the new Poole line opened, and was reduced to goods only status from 1 July 1896.
- Hamworthy: originally called Poole Junction until renaming as Hamworthy Junction on 2 December 1872; renamed Hamworthy on 1 May 1972.
- Holton Heath, opened for goods in 1915 and passengers in 1924;
- Wareham;
- Wool;
- Moreton;
- Dorchester, renamed Dorchester South on 26 December 1949.

== The line today ==
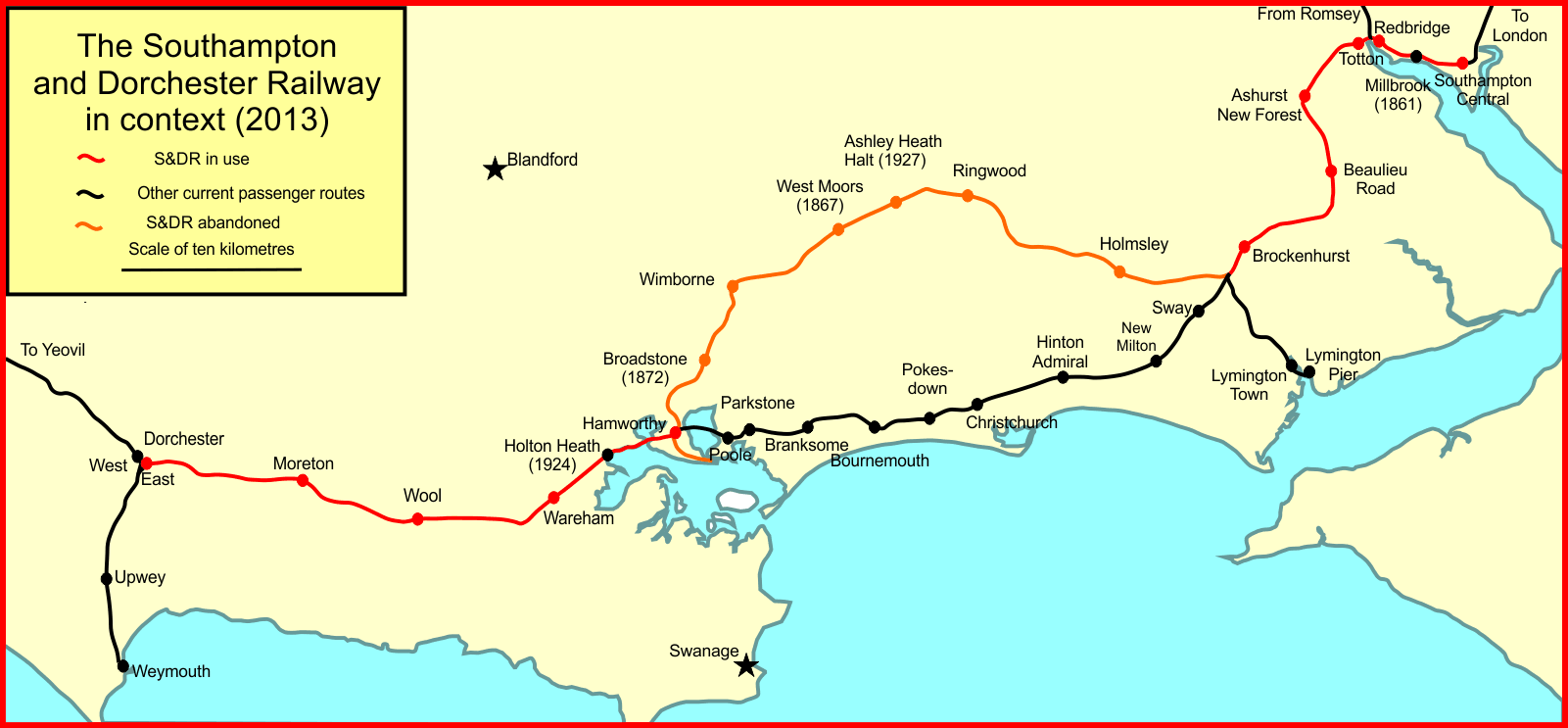
The Southampton and Dorchester line in the context of modern routes

The line remains open from Southampton to the site of Lymington Junction, a mile west of Brockenhurst, and from Hamworthy Junction to Dorchester.

The middle section, between Lymington Junction and Hamworthy Junction closed to passenger traffic on 4 May 1964, although part of this section was kept open for freight access to private sidings for some time. Track lifting began on the section between Lymington Junction and Ringwood, being completed in 1965.

The line from Broadstone to Hamworthy Junction was closed to freight in 1966. Freight traffic continued to Ringwood until August 1967 before being truncated yet again, this time back to a military fuel dump at West Moors. Trains continued to serve West Moors until 1974, before being cut back further still to Wimborne. A light freight service and the use of the sidings at Wimborne for stabling of an exhibition train kept the line open for a further 3 years. Finally the remaining stub from Holes Bay Junction to Wimborne was closed in 1977.

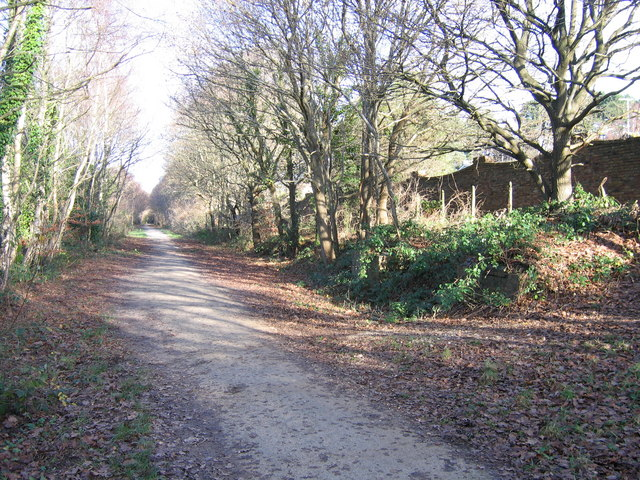
Castleman Trailway, Broadstone

Present-day passenger trains between London and Weymouth run from Lymington Junction via Christchurch and Bournemouth on the South West Main Line. The mileposts along the surviving portions of the Southampton & Dorchester Railway west of Hamworthy Junction are measured from London Waterloo via the direct route through Sway, Bournemouth and Poole. However, bridges on that route section retain their numbering via the Ringwood route from Southampton.

Much of the disused portion between Ringwood and Hamworthy Junction forms the Castleman Trailway, a path which passes through the villages of Ashley Heath, West Moors, Oakley, Broadstone and Upton, as well as Upton Heath, Upton Country Park and Moors Valley Country Park

A report from the Association of Train Operating Companies (ATOC) published in June 2009 recommended the rebuilding of part of the line from Brockenhurst to Ringwood. It looked into the feasibility of reopening disused lines and stations, and concluded that there was a business case for investing £70m in the new link with an hourly service.

In January 2019, the Campaign for Better Transport released a report identifying the line between Brockenhurst and Ringwood was listed as Priority 2 for reopening. Priority 2 is for those lines which require further development or a change in circumstances (such as housing developments).
