= Dorchester railway station =

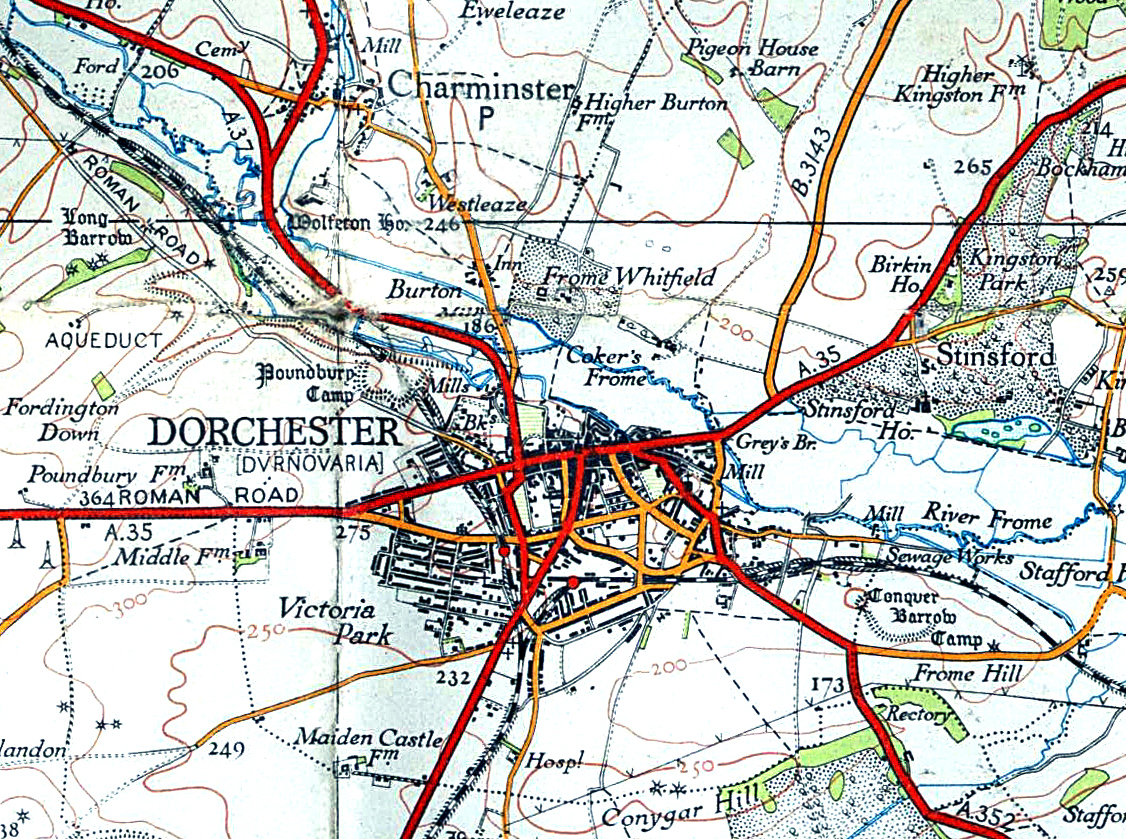
A 1937 Ordnance Survey of Dorchester showing the location of the Dorchester South and Dorchester West

There are two railway stations that serve Dorchester, Dorset.

- Dorchester South railway station Located on the London Waterloo-Weymouth line.
- Dorchester West railway station Located on the Bristol/Castle Cary-Weymouth "Heart of Wessex" line.
