= Ashurst station =

Ashurst station may refer to the following UK stations:

- Ashurst (Kent) railway station
- Ashurst (New Forest) railway station
