= Tanner's Brook =

River in Hampshire, England

Coordinates: 50.9227°N 1.4445°W

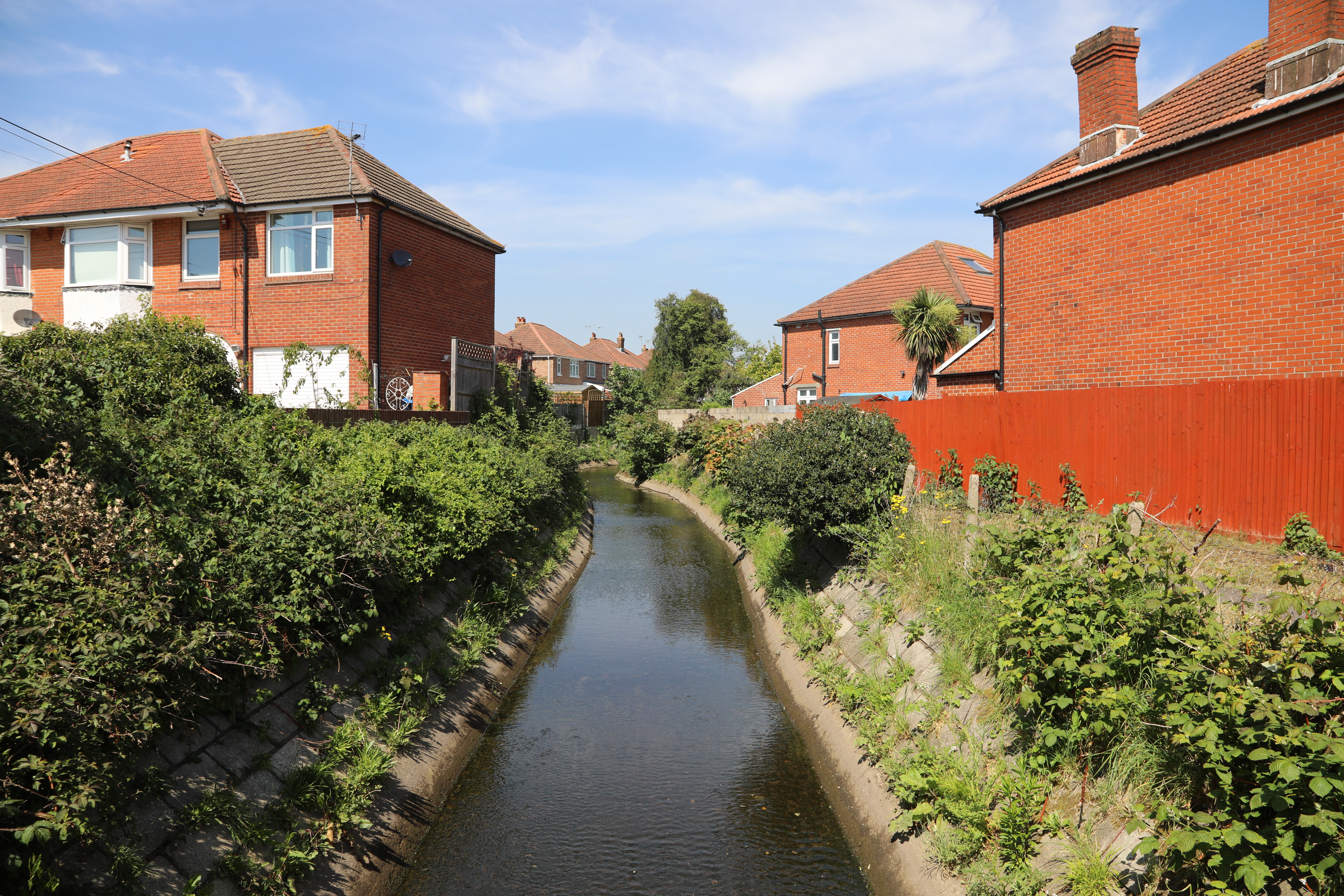
Tanner's brook flowing through Millbrook

Tanner's Brook is a 7-kilometre (4.3 mi) river that rises in North Baddesley and flows to Southampton Water. The brook's name comes from a 19th-century tannery that stood close to where the river passed under Millbrook Road in Millbrook.

The longest tributary of Tanner's Brook is Hollybrook which joins it in Shirley. Above where the two streams join they both flow through sections of Lordsdale Greenway. In November 2025 Southampton city council began the process to have the greenway declared a nature reserve.

On its lower course Tanner's Brook flows through Millbrook and is probably the brook that gives Millbrook its name. Within Millbrook a small section of the river was culverted during the construction of the Salisbury and Southampton Canal. This was filled with concrete in 1964 as part of a flood relief project.

Originally the river was joined on the mudflats of Southampton Water by Wimpson Stream but with the mudflats being reclaimed by the expanding docks the Wimpson Stream now joins Tanner's Brook before it reaches Southampton Water.
