= Sway railway station =

Railway station in Hampshire, England

Coordinates: 50.785°N 1.610°W

Sway
- Station platforms looking towards London in November 2026.

General information
- Location: Sway, District of New Forest; England
- Grid reference: SZ275984
- Manager: South Western Railway
- Platforms: 2

Other information
- Station code: SWY
- Classification: DfT category E

History
- Original company: London and South Western Railway
- Pre-grouping: London and South Western Railway
- Post-grouping: Southern Railway

Key dates
- 6 March 1888: Opened

Passengers
- 2020/21: ▼17,908
- 2021/22: ▲50,164
- 2022/23: ▲65,906
- 2023/24: ▲74,624
- 2024/25: ▲81,398
Location
Notes
- Passenger statistics from the Office of Rail and Road

Sway railway station serves the village of Sway in Hampshire, England. It is located on the South West Main Line from London Waterloo to Weymouth. It is 95 miles 45 chains (153.8 km) down the line from Waterloo.

== History ==
The station is on the stretch of line opened on 6 March 1888 between Brockenhurst and Christchurch to provide a direct line from London to Bournemouth, bypassing the original "Castleman's Corkscrew" line via Ringwood. The station had two platforms either side of a double track running line, there was a signal box and several sidings to the south east. A camping coach was positioned here by the Southern Region from 1956 to 1959 then there were two coaches here until 1967, from 1962 to 1967 they were Pullman camping coaches.

== Facilities ==
The station is served by South Western Railway, who operate stopping services from London Waterloo to Poole throughout the day.

The station has two platforms:

- Platform 1 - for through services towards Southampton.
- Platform 2 - for through services towards Bournemouth and Weymouth.

Both platforms can only accommodate trains of up to five coaches, longer trains only open the doors in the first four or five coaches depending on the type of unit operating the service.

== Services ==
All passenger train services calling here are operated by South Western Railway.

As of February 2022, the following services call here in both directions:

- Monday - Friday
  - peak hours: 2 trains per hour on Poole - London Waterloo service, which some of them join / split at Southampton Central with a fast train for Weymouth
  - off-peak: 1 train per hour on Bournemouth - Winchester stopping service
- Saturday
  - 1 train per hour on Poole - Winchester stopping service
- Sunday
  - 1 train per hour on Poole - London Waterloo stopping service

Preceding station	National Rail	Following station
Brockenhurst	South Western Railway; London-Weymouth	New Milton
