= Holmsley railway station =

Disused railway station in Hampshire, England

Coordinates: 50.8054°N 1.6727°W

Holmsley
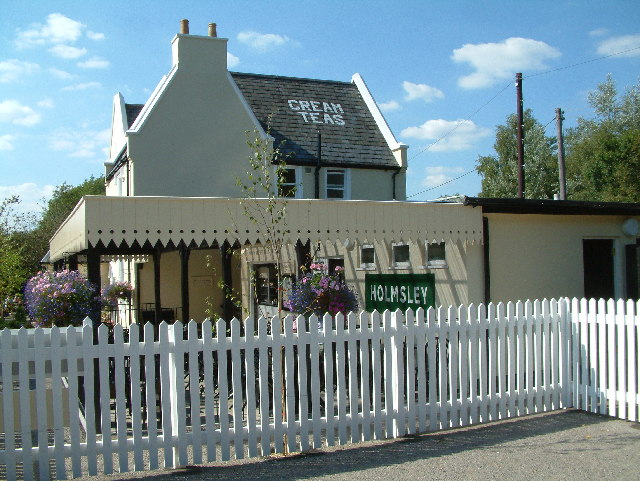
- Former railway station, now a Tea Room

General information
- Location: Holmsley, New Forest, Hampshire; England
- Grid reference: SU232007
- Platforms: 2

Other information
- Status: Disused

History
- Pre-grouping: Southampton and Dorchester Railway; London and South Western Railway
- Post-grouping: Southern Railway; Southern Region of British Railways

Key dates
- 1 June 1847: Opened as "Christchurch Road"
- 13 November 1862: Renamed "Holmsley"
- 4 May 1964: Closed to passengers
Location

Holmsley is a closed railway station in the county of Hampshire which served rural settlements in the New Forest.

== History ==
The station was opened in 1847 as "Christchurch Road" by the Southampton and Dorchester Railway. Sited next to a bridge carrying the A35 road over the line, it was initially the nearest station for the towns of Christchurch and Bournemouth. Coaches served these places until the construction of direct lines, from firstly Ringwood and then Brockenhurst. The station's name was changed to Holmsley on 13 November 1862.

The station fell under the control of the London and South Western Railway before becoming part of the Southern Railway in the 1923 railway grouping. The station closed in 1964, a casualty of the programme of closures advocated by the Beeching Report.

== The site today ==
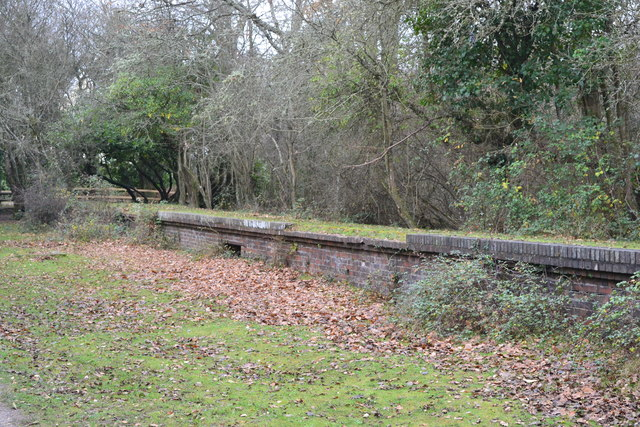
Former railway station platform, Holmsley

The Burley to Brockenhurst road passes under the A35 through the platforms, using the former trackbed for some distance. However, remains of the platforms can be seen, and the station house survives as a tea rooms at the road junction. See also https://stationhouseholmsley.com/

| Preceding station | Disused railways | Following station |
|---|---|---|
| Brockenhurst; Line closed, station open | British Rail; Southern Region; Southampton and Dorchester Railway | Ringwood; Line and station closed |
