= Salisbury and Southampton Canal =

Canal in England

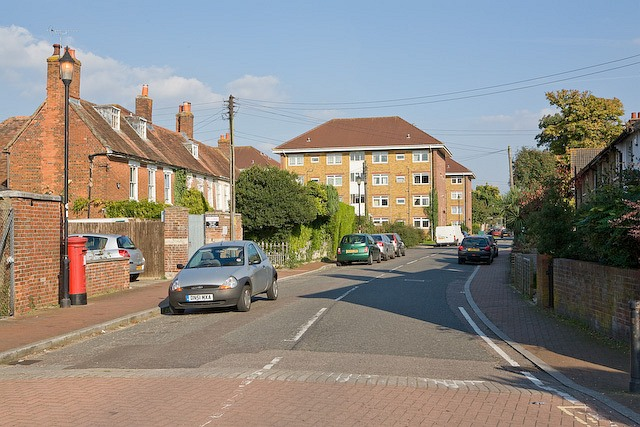
- The presence of the canal bed, which ran left to right, caused problems during the construction of Clover Nook, seven blocks of flats built on Old Redbridge Road. The nearest block is numbers 81 to 96.

Specifications
- Maximum boat length: 60 ft 0 in (18.29 m)
- Maximum boat beam: 8 ft 0 in (2.44 m)
- Locks: 16 or 17
- Status: Mainly destroyed

History
- Original owner: Proprietors of the Salisbury and Southampton Canal
- Principal engineer: John Rennie
- Date of act: 1795
- Date of first use: 1802
- Date closed: 1808

Geography
- Start point: Salisbury
- End point: Southampton
- Connects to: Andover Canal, River Test, River Itchen

The Salisbury and Southampton Canal was intended to be a 13-mile long canal in Hampshire and Wiltshire, southern England. Its proposed route ran from Redbridge, now a western suburb of Southampton at the head of Southampton Water, to Salisbury, and connecting with the Andover Canal at a junction near Mottisfont. Another section, through Southampton, was to connect via a tunnel to the River Itchen. Part of the canal was built and was in use by 1803, but it closed amid financial failure in 1806.

== History ==
The idea of a canal from Salisbury to Redbridge was announced in 1768, after the canal engineer James Brindley had made a survey of a possible route. Two years later, Robert Whitworth was working on plans for a canal from Andover to Redbridge, and the Salisbury Committee wanted Brindley to survey an amended route that would join Whitworth's Canal at Kimbridge. Brindley was too busy and so sent one of his assistants, but the scheme foundered in 1772 when the Andover bill was not presented to Parliament.

Southampton to New Sarum Canal Act 1795
- Act of Parliament
- Parliament of Great Britain
- Long title: An Act for making and maintaining a navigable canal from the town and county of the town of Southampton to the city of New Sarum in the county of Wilts, with a collateral branch to Northam within the liberties of the town of Southampton.
- Citation: 35 Geo. 3. c. 51
- Territorial extent: Great Britain

Dates
- Royal assent: 30 April 1795
- Commencement: 30 April 1795 (Note: The Acts of Parliament (Commencement) Act 1793.)

Status: Current legislation

Text of statute as originally enacted

The route was surveyed in 1793 and authorised by an act of Parliament, the Southampton to New Sarum Canal Act 1795 (35 Geo. 3. c. 51). The proprietors appointed Joseph Hill as the surveyor, who estimated that the project would cost around £50,000. Although the canal had initially attracted strong support from merchants in Bristol, who saw it as part of a link between Bristol and Southampton, many of the shareholders did not respond to the calls for money, and so the company was always short of working capital. The job of constructing the tunnel in Southampton was given to Thomas Jenkins, but the work did not go well, and John Rennie was asked to inspect it. His report highlighted serious deficiencies with the work.

Hill resigned from the project shortly afterwards. A new act of Parliament, the Itchen Navigation Act 1800 (39 & 40 Geo. 3. c. cviii) was obtained, which authorised the raising of additional capital, but although the company found it difficult to obtain extra shareholders, they appointed George Jones as the resident engineer, and some progress was made. By January 1803, the canal was in use from the west end of the tunnel to Redbridge, where it joined the Andover Canal, and from Kimbridge, further north on the Andover Canal, to West Grimstead, 4 miles (6.4 km) to the east of Salisbury. The company struggled to find the money to continue construction, and sheriffs seized parts of the canal after Jones sued the company for failing to pay his salary and won the court action.

Tolls were collected until at least the end of 1804, and the canal was still being used for some months after that, but a lack of maintenance and some wilful damage resulted in the canal being closed in 1806. The company was defunct by 1808. Parts of the Salisbury arm soon became dry, and others became a small stream, but the section in Southampton became a stagnant ditch. In 1841 a woman drowned in the canal, after which the council took action and filled it in. Raising money and getting the legal powers, through the Southampton Marsh Act 1844, to fill canal in delayed work until 1846 and the final grassing over didn't take place until 1851.

Although some of this section was re-used by the Southampton and Dorchester Railway when it was constructed, plans to re-use the tunnel were abandoned when it was found to be unsuitable. A new, larger, railway tunnel was excavated on a different alignment and at a slightly higher level which resulted in the partial removal of the canal bore.

== Route ==
=== Southampton branch ===
Very little remains of the Southampton Branch of the canal. In 1966, Edwin Welch produced a short book for the Southampton Records Office, the research for which included the production of annotated maps, based on 2.5-inch Ordnance Survey maps from the 1930s, to document the route. Development was rapidly obliterating what few remains there were.

The branch from the Test started close to God's House Tower, which at the time was on the riverbank; this area has changed a great deal, with reclamation of land for the ferry terminal. From there it headed due north. The street names of Canal Walk and Lower Canal Walk give some clues to the route, but the canal was filled in haphazardly in the middle of the 19th century, and was then built over. The street plans were altered significantly after the Second World War, when Queensway was built. When the Palmerston House housing project was being built on Queensway in 1961, excavations for the foundations located part of a wharf, but no drawings were made before it was buried beneath concrete.

The Test branch met the Itchen branch at the eastern end of the canal tunnel through the high ground to the west; the junction was just to the south of the railway's later Southampton Tunnel on the eastern edge of what is now Palmerston Park. The Itchen branch curved to the north-east to reach a lock in the vicinity of the wharf which was downstream of Northam Bridge. Construction of the Southampton and Dorchester Railway in 1846 and of a gasworks in 1848 destroyed much of the route, and excavations along this length in the 1960s failed to find any trace of it. Around 1998, a section was found during the construction of St Mary's Stadium and now lies beneath a railway footbridge. The tunnel beneath the Marlands area headed westwards from the junction. A depression in the ground on the Eastern side of Palmerstone Park now marks the site of this eastern tunnel portal which can be seen on old maps and plans and contemporary documentation. The 1846 street map of Southampton shows a row of houses at this location named "Canal View". The incomplete tunnel alignment followed a straight line to the western portal, its length recorded on contemporary company plans as either 560 yards (510 m) or 584 yards (534 m).

The western portal was on the far side of the intervening high ground to the north of the current Kingsbridge Lane. The canal tunnel proved difficult and expensive to construct and canal company records indicate it was neither fully completed or used for traffic. Several sections sank or collapsed during construction due to geological conditions, poor materials or improper supervision of the works.

In the 1840s the Southampton and Dorchester Railway constructed a railway tunnel through this same high ground, cutting through the route of the canal tunnel at an acute angle towards the western portal. Early reports by the railway's engineer suggested it might be possible to use the canal tunnel in some way for the construction of the railway but by the time the bill for construction was placed before Parliament this idea had been rejected and a new alignment with a shorter tunnel was proposed. A contemporary cross-sectional drawing, made in June 1847, shows that close to the point at which the two tunnels met the base of the canal tunnel was only slightly lower than that of the railway tunnel, and that the level of the water it contained was at a similar level to the base of the new tunnel. The alignments and levels of the two tunnels meant that water was able to accumulate beneath the level of the newer, larger, structure and saturate the surrounding gravels and clays. Just before the railway tunnel's planned opening date, saturation of the ground around the area of the old canal tunnel was reported to be responsible for a collapse of a recently constructed 100-yard section at London Road on 23 April 1847. After repairs were completed and a formal inspection had taken place, a further 60-yard section began to sink and opening was delayed for two months whilst this was also dealt with. Captain Coddington, the Government Surveyor of Railways visited the site to report on the situation and recorded what had become of the canal tunnel:

"About 50 or 60 years ago a Tunnel was constructed for canal purposes which proved a failure and was abandoned, its direction was such as to cross very obliquely the line of the New Railway Tunnel and its level was about a foot below the level of the new tunnel. I enquired what precautions had been taken at the crossing, and was informed that the old Tunnel had been completely taken out...and in addition a length of 20 feet of the old tunnel on each side of the new one had been built up solid with rubble masonry...

"It appears that Mr Peto the contractor, for the accommodation of those parties whose property lies above the line of the old Tunnel...agreed to strengthen it by building a certain number of cross walls at short intervals...The mode adopted in doing it was to drive a small gallery laterally from the side of the new Tunnel to reach the old one at a point some distance beyond the 20 feet which had been solidly built up. Through this gallery the materials were introduced and 3, 4 or more cross walls about 10 feet apart were built within it...

"The old tunnel having been on a level and open at its extremities whatever percolation of water entered it either from the sides or above flowed out at both ends. The crossing of the new tunnel in no way affected this drainage...so the soil (a black Clay) continued firm enough to support the brickwork laid upon it. But by the filling up solid of a portion of it, leaving a hollow interval...the accumulation of water in seeking an egress has entered into, saturated, and sodden the clay on which the new Tunnel stands, and it is now incapable of supporting its weight."

The situation below ground caused problems when the foundations for Marland House were being dug in 1963, and the heading was reopened between the railway tunnel and the canal tunnel in 1965. This revealed that the brickwork was still in good condition at that point, but that the tunnel was largely filled with rubble as reported in 1847, and contained water below the level of the adjacent railway tunnel. The heading was sealed behind a partial relining of this section of the railway tunnel in 1983.

Further ground movements in 1975 led the city council to dig shafts at the former King Edward's School building on Havelock Road, and to drill boreholes into the remaining sections of the canal tunnel, to investigate the situation. The tunnel was entered via these shafts towards the western end and was pumped out. This allowed recording, measuring and photography before the tunnel was filled with flyash to prevent further ground movement. At this time, the former western tunnel portal lay beneath the then R J Mitchell museum to the north of Kingsbridge Lane. This area is today bounded by a multi-storey car park, a BBC site and Kingsbridge Lane pedestrian area. Early maps of this area show a water feature in the grounds of Kingsfield, and later Kingsbridge House and the school on the site. This appears on both the 1846 street map of Southampton and the 25 inch Ordnance Survey map dated 1897. A line drawn between this and an earthwork feature shown on the 1846 map in what later became Palmerston Park approximates to the documented length of the canal tunnel of between 560 or 580 yards. This earthwork feature lay just to the north of "Canal View" on this map, but no other details of the canal are shown around the tunnel area.

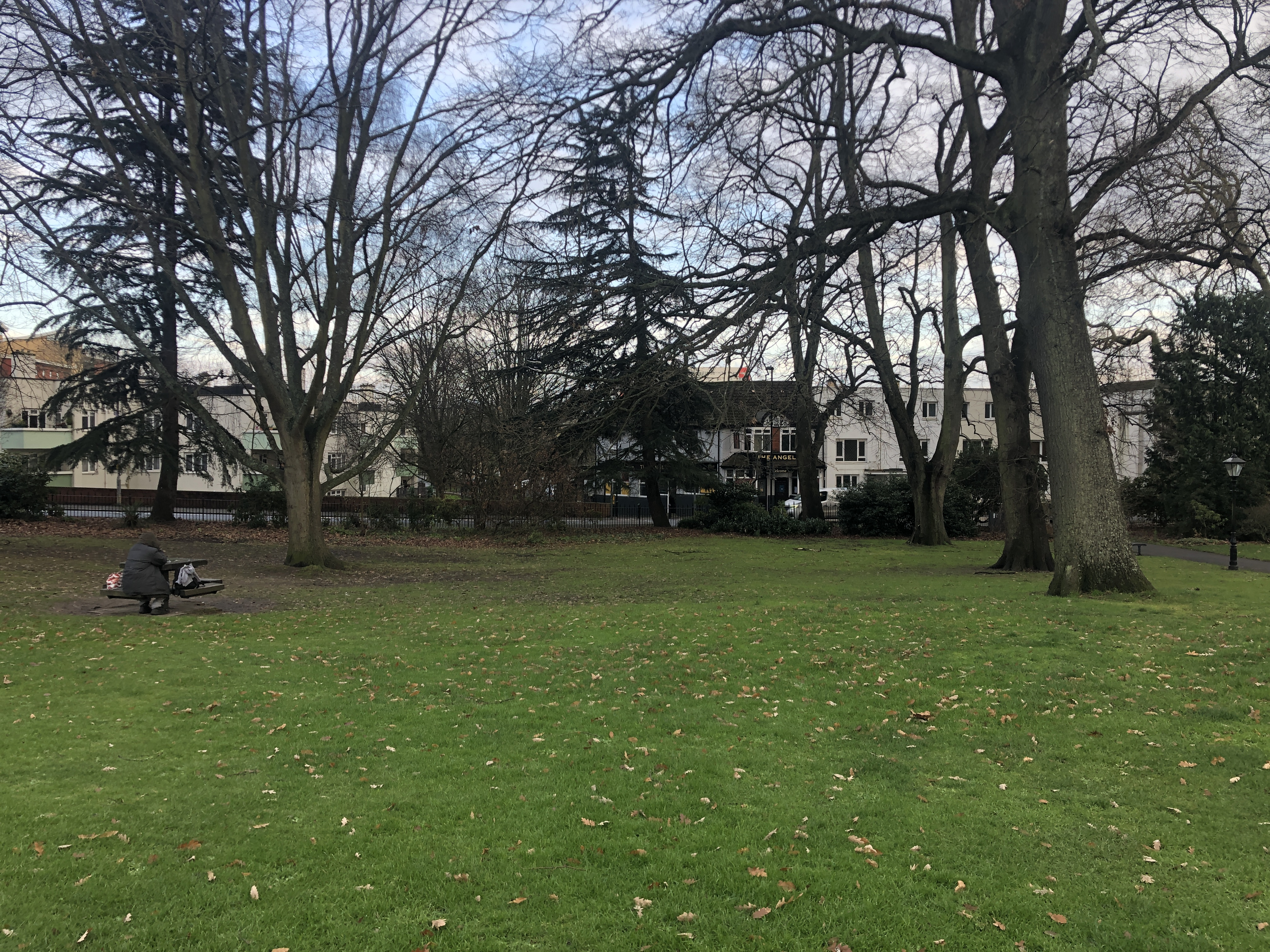
The canal tunnel passed under part of Palmerstone Park, Southampton

Ground movement within the railway tunnel has caused issues for the railway line since the 1960s when the invert was found to be rising, with work in 1965, 1983 and 2009. In 2009, freight trains were recorded as hitting the side of the tunnel as the track bed moved and works were done in conjunction with lowering the railway level by installing integral track in a new concrete base at the invert.

The next section of the canal lies beneath the northern part of the Southampton Central railway station site, but there is a small area of woodland to the north of the railway line about 400 yards (370 m) to the west of the station, where remains of the canal bank were still discernible in 1966. To the west, the railway and the Millbrook Trading Estate have destroyed the route, which was either under or just to the north of the railway tracks. In 1964, when the Tanners Brook flood relief scheme was being constructed, a six-foot-wide brick-arched culvert which carried the brook under the canal was unearthed by the Hampshire Rivers Board, the bed of this section of the canal being recorded as lying above the nearby high water mark and fed from the local streams it crossed. The culvert was subsequently filled with concrete.

Some 1,150 yards (1,050 m) to the east of Redbridge station, the route crossed to the south of the railway, to run along the bank of the Test. This area has been altered by reclamation of the mudflats and the construction of the Prince Charles container port. The route of the canal here was marked on the 1871 Ordnance Survey map, and much of it still appeared on the 1961–1968 edition, some 90 years later. Railway sidings to the south of Redbridge station, now lifted, gradually destroyed the western end of this section, while the eastern end was filled in by the Docks Board between 1963 and 1965. The small section that remained between the two was pumped out by the Southampton Auxiliary Fire Service in 1966 so that it could be measured and recorded.

The final section re-crossed the railway line just to the east of Redbridge station, and headed broadly north-west to join the Andover Canal near the western end of Gover Road, Redbridge. Between these points, the canal formation caused problems when flats were being built on Old Redbridge Road, while the junction was destroyed when the Andover Railway was built in 1864.

=== Kimbridge to Alderbury ===
In contrast to the Southampton Branch, the northern branch from Kimbridge Junction to Alderbury Wharf is easier to trace, because although the railway followed the general course of the canal, it took a much straighter route, and was only built over its formation for short lengths. The canal left the Andover Canal some 250 yards (230 m) to the south of Mottisfont railway station, on the former Andover and Redbridge Railway, which diverged from the line to Salisbury at Kimbridge railway junction. The line has been lifted, but the station house still exists, on the road from the A3057 at Stonymarsh to Mottisfont. Sections of it now form part of the Test Way long-distance footpath. The canal turned to the south-west, crossing the eastern channel of the Test close to the location of the railway bridge, and then crossed the western channel of the Test and the River Dun. Earthworks marking its course are shown on modern Ordnance Survey maps.

It looped to the south of the railway, and then recrossed it, turning south-west again near Mottisfont & Dunbridge station. It was sandwiched between the Dunbridge to Lockerley road and the River Dun, before crossing back to the north side of the tracks at Lockerley. It followed the southern bank of the Dun fairly closely, and the associated earthworks can be readily seen on modern maps almost to East Dean. The railway was built over the canal through East Dean, but two further loops to the south before the canal reached West Dean can be seen. On the edge of West Dean, the canal crossed from Hampshire into Wiltshire. Beyond West Dean, the canal was closer to the railway formation, but still wound from side to side, and diverged further to the north as it passed East Grimstead. On its way, it crossed to the south of the railway and of Dean Road, just before the road and the route of the canal passes under the railway. As it passes East Grimstead, it is marked as "Old Canal" on modern maps. The only extant original bridge is located here. It consists of a single arch built in brick, and it is a grade II listed structure. The railway again ran on top of the canal through West Grimstead, and there was a final loop to the north, before it crossed to the southern side of the railway for the last time.

Just to the south of Alderbury Junction, where the abandoned Salisbury and Dorset Junction Railway left the line to Salisbury, the canal turned to the south-west, to avoid the high ground on which Alderbury stands. The A36 Alderbury bypass has in its turn obliterated part of the railway near the junction. The canal looped around ending at a road called Tunnel Hill, close to Alderbury House, a grade II* listed country house on the western edge of Alderbury, which was built in the late eighteenth century. A lake in the grounds is thought to have been built as part of the canal, and Tunnel Hill may reflect the fact that there would have been a tunnel just past the road, if the company had been able to finish the construction. The route of this final section is not easy to trace on a map, but it was not clearly defined on the 1881 map either, and there is some uncertainty about what was completed before all work ceased. Another feature of the canal was the feeder reservoirs. One remains, above the road from Alderbury to Farley at Pope's Bottom. The feeder passes under the road through an original bridge. A second reservoir was located to the south of the road, and although no longer there, its outline broadly follows a gap in the tree cover on the modern map.

== Points of interest ==
The table shows points on the Andover Canal to Salisbury section, based on Russell. Most are clearly visible on current Ordnance Survey maps. Points on the Southampton Branch are based on Welch.

Point	Coordinates (Links to map resources)	OS Grid Ref	Notes
Tunnel Hill Alderbury	51.0414°N 1.7438°W	SU180269	approx end of construction
Rectory Farm Alderbury	51.034795°N 1.731244°W	SU189261	canal passed round farm
Summit level cutting	51.0418°N 1.7145°W	SU201269	between 2 railway embankments
Surviving bridge	51.0441°N 1.6806°W	SU224272	by East Grimstead Church
Remains of lock 9	51.0432°N 1.6510°W	SU245271	under bridge on farm track
Remains of lock	51.0404°N 1.5890°W	SU289268	by road to Holbury Wood
Dunbridge embankment	51.0314°N 1.5581°W	SU310258	
Junction with Andover Canal	51.0348°N 1.5268°W	SU332262	approx
Southampton Branch west end	50.9247°N 1.4757°W	SU369140	
Route through container terminal	50.9129°N 1.4641°W	SU377127	service road follows canal
Route discernible in 1966	50.9076°N 1.4196°W	SU409121	Woods near Central station
Western end of tunnel	50.9073°N 1.4082°W	SU417121	
Eastern end of tunnel	50.9064°N 1.4015°W	SU421120	
End of River Test branch	50.8959°N 1.4022°W	SU421108	God's House Tower
End of River Itchen branch	50.9135°N 1.3826°W	SU434128	Wharf near Northam Bridge

== See also ==
- River Avon, Hampshire § 17th-century navigation – an earlier route from Salisbury to the coast
- Canals of the United Kingdom
- History of the British canal system

== Bibliography ==
- Course, Edwin (1977). "Southampton Canal Tunnel" (PDF). Hants Field Club. Archived (PDF) from the original on 3 January 2018.
- Hadfield, Charles (1969). The Canals of South and South East England. David and Charles. ISBN 978-0-7153-4693-8.
- Russell, Ronald (1971). Lost Canals of England and Wales. David and Charles. ISBN 978-0-7153-5417-9.
- Welch, Edwin (1966). The Bankrupt Canal: Southampton and Salisbury 1795–1808. Southampton City Council.
