= Ashurst New Forest railway station =

Railway station in the Hampshire, England

Coordinates: 50.890°N 1.527°W

Ashurst New Forest
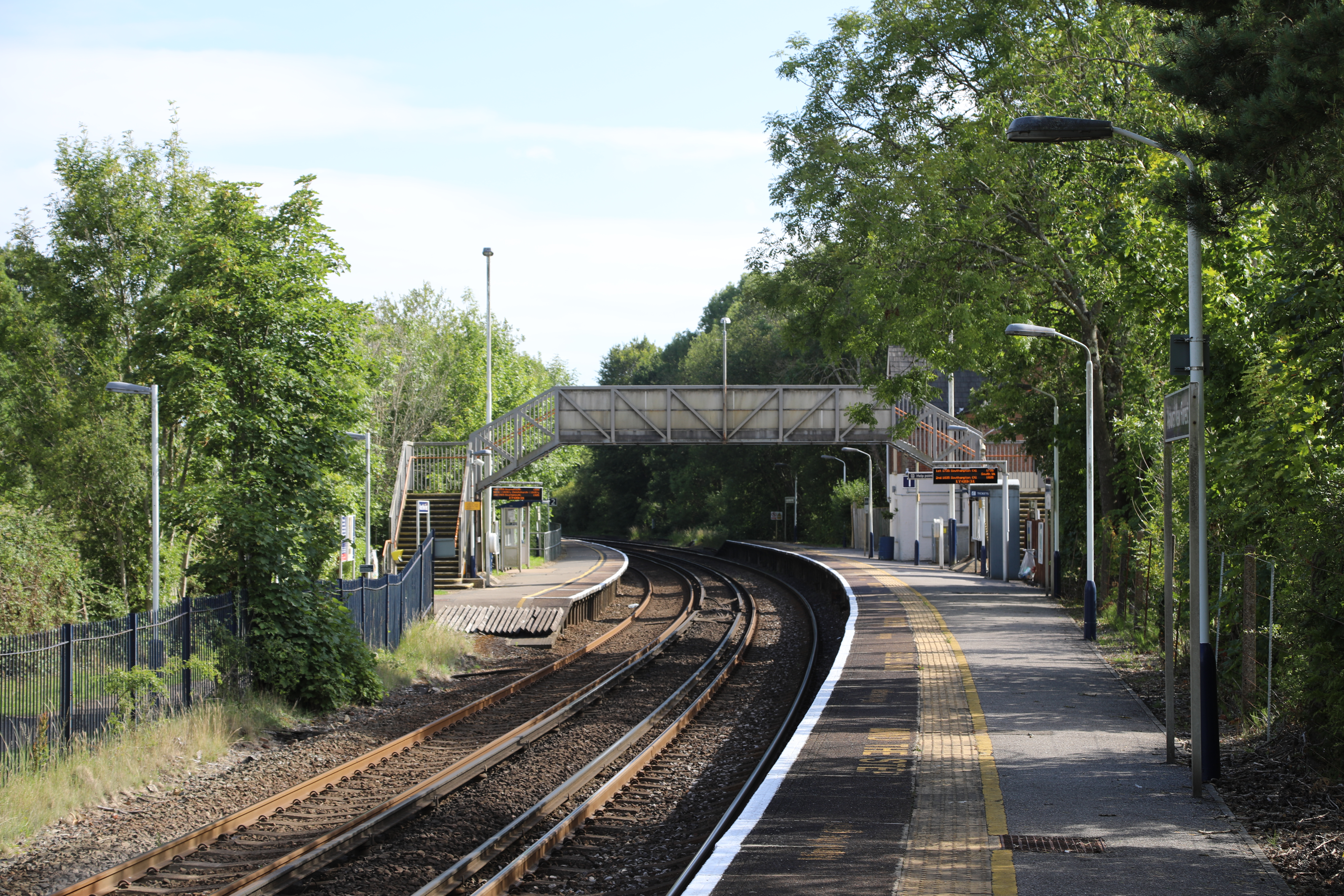
- Ashurst New Forest station platforms

General information
- Location: Ashurst, District of New Forest; England
- Grid reference: SU333101
- Managed by: South Western Railway
- Platforms: 2

Other information
- Station code: ANF
- Classification: DfT category F2

History
- Original company: Southampton and Dorchester Railway
- Pre-grouping: London and South Western Railway
- Post-grouping: Southern Railway

Key dates
- 1 June 1847: Opened as "Lyndhurst Road"
- 24 September 1995: Renamed "Ashurst New Forest"

Passengers
- 2020/21: ▼30,792
- 2021/22: ▲74,566
- 2022/23: ▲91,488
- 2023/24: ▲0.102 million
- 2024/25: ▲0.108 million
Location
Notes
- Passenger statistics from the Office of Rail and Road

Ashurst New Forest railway station is in Ashurst, Hampshire, England, on the South West Main Line from London Waterloo to Weymouth. It is 85 miles 43 chains (137.7 km) down the line from Waterloo.

== History ==
Opened as Lyndhurst Road on 1 June 1847 by the Southampton and Dorchester Railway, then absorbed by the London and South Western Railway, it became part of the Southern Railway during the grouping of 1923.

The station was host to a Southern Railway camping coach from 1936 to 1939.

The station then passed on to the Southern Region of British Railways on nationalisation in 1948. A camping coach was positioned here by the Southern Region from 1954 to 1960, the coach was replaced in 1961 by a Pullman camping coach until 1965 which was joined by another Pullman for 1966 and 1967.

The station was renamed Ashurst New Forest on 24 September 1995. When sectorisation was introduced in the 1980s, the station was served by Network SouthEast until the privatisation of British Railways.

On 5 April 2025 a Simon Chadwick mural was unveiled at the station as part of the Railway 200 celebrations.

== Services ==
The station is some 200 to 300 yards from the village of Ashurst, and is used by visitors to the New Forest. It is served hourly by the London Waterloo to Poole stopping services operated by South Western Railway, with some additional fast trains to London Waterloo and to Weymouth at weekday peak periods. The services are formed of Class 444 electric multiple units, and Class 450 units. Services were previously operated by Class 442 Wessex Electrics, which were withdrawn at the start of February 2007.

The station is unstaffed, but there is a self-service ticket machine on platform 1.

=== Historical stock and services ===
In the 1980s and 1990s most services were formed of slam-door Class 423 4-VEP and Class 421 4-CIG units. Services have varied through the years between through services from Waterloo to Bournemouth or beyond, or local "shuttle" services from Southampton Central to Brockenhurst or the Bournemouth area. Immediately following the Solent electrification in 1990, through services from Portsmouth operated.

== Notes ==
Preceding station	National Rail	Following station
Totton	South Western Railway; London-Weymouth	Beaulieu Road
