= Beaulieu Road railway station =

Railway station in Hampshire, England

Beaulieu Road
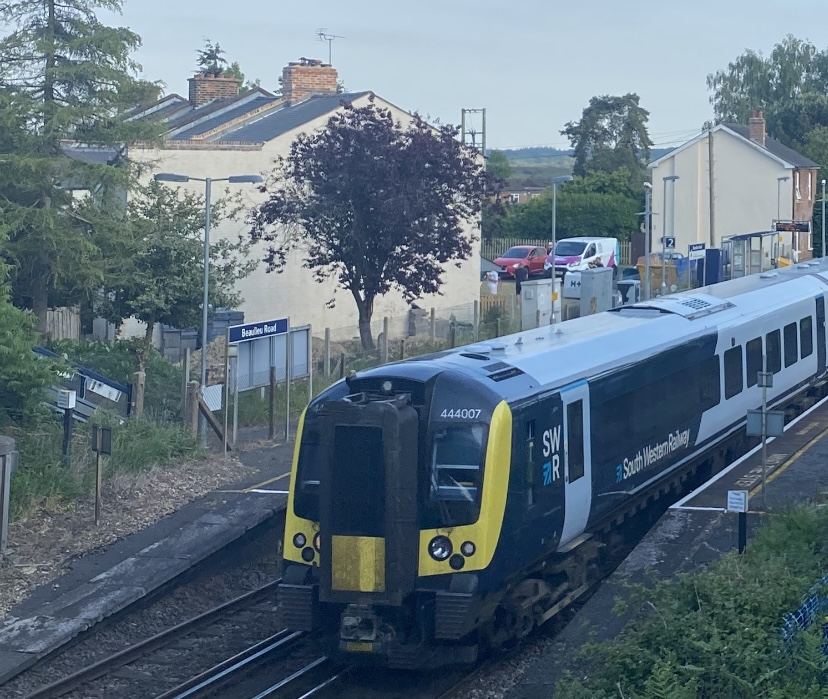
- Beaulieu Road platforms in 2020, facing south, with an up service bound for London Waterloo passing.

General information
- Location: Beaulieu, District of New Forest; England
- Coordinates: 50°51′16″N 1°30′17″W
- Grid reference: SU349062
- Manager: South Western Railway
- Platforms: 2

Other information
- Station code: BEU
- Classification: DfT category F2

History
- Original company: Southampton and Dorchester Railway
- Pre-grouping: London and South Western Railway
- Post-grouping: Southern Railway

Key dates
- 1 June 1847: Opened
- 1 March 1860: Closed
- 1 November 1895: Reopened

Passengers
- 2021/22: ▲11,832
- 2022/23: ▲15,446
- 2023/24: ▲16,038
- 2024/25: ▲19,838
- 2025/26: ▲25,652
Location
Notes
- Passenger statistics from the Office of Rail and Road

Beaulieu Road railway station is located at the point where the South West Main Line from London Waterloo to Weymouth crosses the B3056 road from Beaulieu to Lyndhurst in Hampshire, England. It is 88 miles 6 chains (141.7 km) down the line from Waterloo. Beaulieu Road is the least-used station in Hampshire, according to the official passenger statistics. There is a PERTIS machine on platform 1 where customers can purchase a Permit to Travel.

== History ==
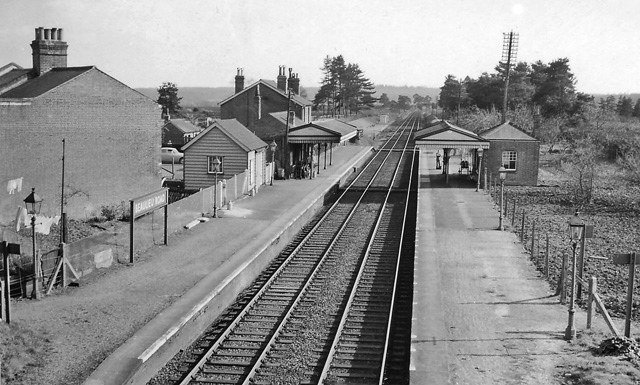
The station in 1963

Opened by the Southampton and Dorchester Railway (S&DR) on 1 June 1847, as it was the closest point to nearby Beaulieu and Hythe from the main line.

The station was closed by the London and South Western Railway (which had absorbed the S&DR in 1848) on 1 March 1860, and reopened on 1 November 1895. It was destaffed in 1964.

== Services ==
Nowadays the station is served by London Waterloo to Poole stopping services operated by South Western Railway. As of the December 2007 timetable, on Mondays to Fridays trains call only during the morning peak and late afternoon. From May 2008, a late morning service has also been added in each direction. In 2013 there were down trains, towards Poole, every two or three hours on Monday to Friday, the last being 20:44, but only three up trains (08:08, 11:38 and 18:38). On Saturdays there were five up and six down services. On Sundays, however, there was a better service, with trains to and from Poole calling hourly throughout the day.

The May 2016 timetable is essentially the same as that of 2013, though an extra weekday London-bound departure has been added at 13:38.

As of summer 2021 there is an hourly service on Sundays, two-hourly service on Saturdays, and approximately two-hourly Monday to Friday though with a gap in up services in the mid-afternoon between 13:37 and 17:38.

Even on Sundays, however, services to and from Brockenhurst are much more frequent than those to Beaulieu Road.

The New Forest Tour summer open-top bus service stops adjacent to Beaulieu Road.

=== Historical services ===
In 1981 (a timetable typical of the 1980s) the station was served by an hourly stopping service from London to Bournemouth on Mondays to Saturdays. At that time, in contrast to today, the station had no service on Sundays.

Preceding station	National Rail	Following station
Ashurst New Forest	South Western Railway; London-Weymouth	Brockenhurst
