= Southampton Tunnel =

Railway tunnel in Hampshire, England

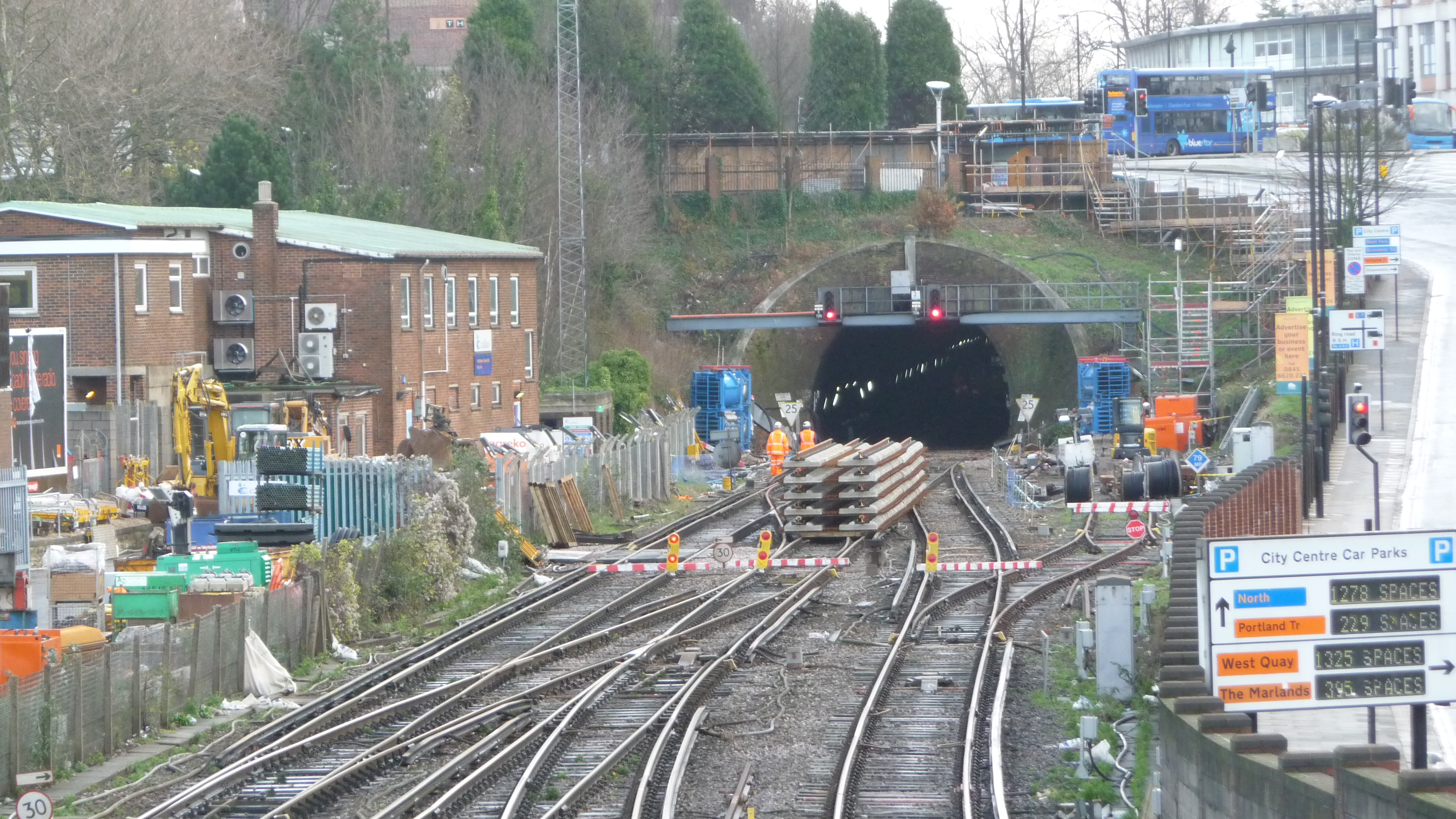
- Engineering works at Southampton Tunnel, December 2009 to January 2010
- Interactive map of Southampton Tunnel

Overview
- Line: South West Main Line
- Location: Southampton, Hampshire
- Coordinates: 50°54′25″N 1°24′28″W

Operation
- Work began: 1845
- Opened: August 1847
- Owner: Network Rail

Southampton Tunnel (alternatively known as the Southampton Civic Centre Tunnel) is a 528-yard railway tunnel that runs close to the Civic Centre in the centre of the Hampshire city of Southampton, in England.

The tunnel was constructed by the Southampton and Dorchester Railway to enable the Southampton and Dorchester Railway to pass through Southampton and join the London and Southampton Railway. Southampton West End station, subsequently relocated and presently known as Southampton Central lies to the West of the Tunnel. The experienced civil engineer Samuel Morton Peto acted as contractor for the works with the majority of the tunnel being constructed using traditional cut-and-cover techniques. Its route cut through that of the Salisbury and Southampton Canal, an incomplete project that had partially built an earlier tunnel; the presence of this earlier engineering work would negatively impact the project due to the prior disturbance of the ground. The tunnel suffered a collapse during construction, and subsequent movement of the structure delayed its opening until two months after that of the rest of the line, being finally opened to traffic for the first time during August 1847.

Carrying a pair of tracks throughout its length, it has been periodically operated as a single-track only tunnel while remedial or improvement work was performed. Southampton Tunnel has been used by a variety of direct passenger services connecting the South Coast with London and the North. In addition, the tunnel has facilitated large amounts of freight movement to and from the Southampton Container Terminal and the rest of the UK. During 2009–10, it was subject to extensive re-engineering works, successfully raising both its loading gauge and maximum speed for container traffic.

== Construction ==
During 1845, approval for the construction of a railway to serve Southampton, Ringwood, Poole and Dorchester was secured by an act of Parliament. The Southampton and Dorchester Railway's line had been proposed either to start from a terminus close to the Royal Pier and be connected with the existing London and Southampton Railway via a tramway, or to run to the north of the existing town via a cutting and a short tunnel. The Pier and Harbour Board objected to the seaward route despite it being favoured by the town council, and the northerley route was chosen when the line's bill finally passed through the parliamentary process. According to local historian Jake Simpkin, for the proposed railway to traverse the hill at Marlands, the construction of Southampton Tunnel was the only realistic choice, as a surface alignment would have severely impacted the planned development of parkland around Southampton. The tunnel had originally been proposed as being just 160 yards (150 m) in length, but during the parliamentary stages, to avoid compromising the towns plans to convert the Lamas Lands to parks, a longer tunnel of 528 yards (483 m) was agreed upon. The route selected for the new tunnel cut through that of the Salisbury and Southampton Canal tunnel, an earlier project that had been abandoned four decades before. Early reports by the railway's engineer suggested it might be possible to use the canal tunnel in some way for the construction of the railway but by the time the bill for construction was placed before Parliament this idea had been rejected and a new alignment with a shorter tunnel was proposed.

The Southampton and Dorchester Railway's railway's engineer was William Moorsom and the contractor for the construction of the line was Samuel Morton Peto through his company Messrs Grissell and Peto. It was decided to construct the majority of the tunnel using the traditional cut-and-cover method, with only a limited section (the portion running directly underneath the London Road) being actually bored out. Experienced miners from Cornwall were recruited for the project as their specialist skills were valued for the bored section. The pre-existing incomplete canal tunnel crossed the intended route of the new railway tunnel at an acute angle and a slightly lower level near their western ends. A contemporary scale cross-sectional drawing dated June 1847 shows that, close to the point at which the two tunnels met, the base of the canal tunnel was only slightly lower than that of the railway tunnel and that the level of the water it contained was at a similar level to the base of the new tunnel. The canal tunnel had itself proven difficult to construct, with various sections sinking or collapsing due to geological conditions, poor materials and improper supervision of the works. It became apparent that the canal works had compromised the ground considerably, and despite removal of a section of the older tunnel where it was crossed by the new structure, geological problems accentuated by heavy rain and hard frosts in 1846/47 plagued the railway tunnel's construction. Buildings in the vicinity of London Road (later Above Bar Street) suffered subsidence and there were concerns expressed about the state of the road.

The specific alignments and levels of the two tunnels meant that water was able to accumulate beneath the level of the new structure and saturate the surrounding gravels and clays. Just prior to the railway tunnel's planning opening date, saturation of the ground around the area of old the canal tunnel was reported to be responsible for a collapse of a recently constructed 100 yard section at London Road on 23 April 1847. The collapse caused two bystanders to fall into the workings, but they were fortunately unhurt and able to walk out of the eastern entrance.

Just over two weeks later, on Thursday 20 and Friday 21 May 1847, Captain Coddington, the Government Surveyor of Railway, was able to inspect the line for the Board of Trade. He spent two to three hours in the tunnel and reported that the recent collapse had been repaired and that he considered the tunnel to be "a very well executed work". However, on 30 May, before the route could be formally opened, a bulge in the brickwork of the tunnel revealed a 60-foot section had begun to sink and the tunnel needed further repairs. The Southampton and Dorchester Railway was officially opened in June 1847 but the Southampton Tunnel section was only able to be opened to traffic two months later when repairs had been completed. Whilst the tunnel alone was closed, passengers were conveyed to waiting trains at either side via specially-chartered buses. Following repairs Captain Coddington visited the site again with Moorsom the engineer and Peto the contractor and reported:

"About 50 or 60 years ago a Tunnel was constructed for canal purposes which proved a failure and was abandoned, its direction was such as to cross the very obliquely the line of the New Railway Tunnel and its level was about a foot below the level of the new tunnel. I enquired what precautions had been taken at the crossing, and was informed that the old Tunnel had been completely taken out...and in addition a length of 20 feet of the old tunnel on each side of the new one had been built up solid with rubble masonry...

"It appears that Mr Peto the contractor, for the accommodation of those parties whose property lies above the line of the old Tunnel...agreed to strengthen it by building a certain number of cross walls at short intervals...The mode adopted in doing it was to drive a small gallery laterally from the side of the new Tunnel to reach the old one at a point some distance beyond the 20 feet which had been solidly built up. Through this gallery the materials were introduced and 3, 4 or more cross walls about 10 feet apart were built within it...

"The old tunnel having been on a level and open at its extremities whatever percolation of water entered it either from the sides or above flowed out at both ends. The crossing of the new tunnel in no way affected this drainage...so the soil (a black Clay) continued firm enough to support the brickwork laid upon it. But by the filling up solid of a portion of it, leaving a hollow interval...the accumulation of water in seeking an egress has entered into, saturated, and sodden the clay on which the new Tunnel stands, and it is now incapable of supporting its weight."

As constructed, the tunnel was 528 yards (482.8m) long and when inspected after construction had a maximum of 18 foot (5.5 m) of earth above it. Originally brick lined throughout, the line within rose at a gradient of 1:396 from each end to a point inside the tunnel. Two workmen are recorded as having lost their lives during construction.

== Operating history and services ==
The tunnel remained in use fulfilling its intended purpose until, in the 1960s, the invert (tunnel base) was found to be rising at one point. Following this and concerns over ground movements in the vicinity of the tunnel extensive remedial work was undertaken between November 1964 and March 1965, with single line working through the tunnel allowing traffic to continue. During this work the heading was reopened between the railway tunnel and the canal tunnel in 1965. This revealed that the brickwork within was still in good condition at that point, but that the tunnel was largely filled with rubble as reported in 1847.

The remaining western section of the Canal Tunnel was drained and filled with flyash in the 1970s using shafts dug from the surface in order to stabilise the ground above. Between 1983 and 1985, British Rail decided to perform extensive engineering works to facilitate the movement of larger containers through Southampton Tunnel. As part of these works, the railway through the tunnel was again operated as a single line and a narrow-gauge railway was constructed to convey materials from the western end. As a result of this work three sections of the tunnel's interior were rebuilt with segmental steel linings, sealing off the canal tunnel heading again in the process.

Presently, Southampton Tunnel is mostly used by trains on the South West Main Line from London Waterloo to Bournemouth and Weymouth, on the Wessex Main Line from Portsmouth to Bristol, and for journeys on the local line from Portsmouth to Southampton. Additional journeys are made on the West Coastway Line from Southampton to London Victoria via Gatwick Airport, and on the Cross Country services from Bournemouth to various points in the north of England. The tunnel is signalled for reversible working (trains can travel in either direction on both lines) and controlled from the Eastleigh Area Signalling Centre.

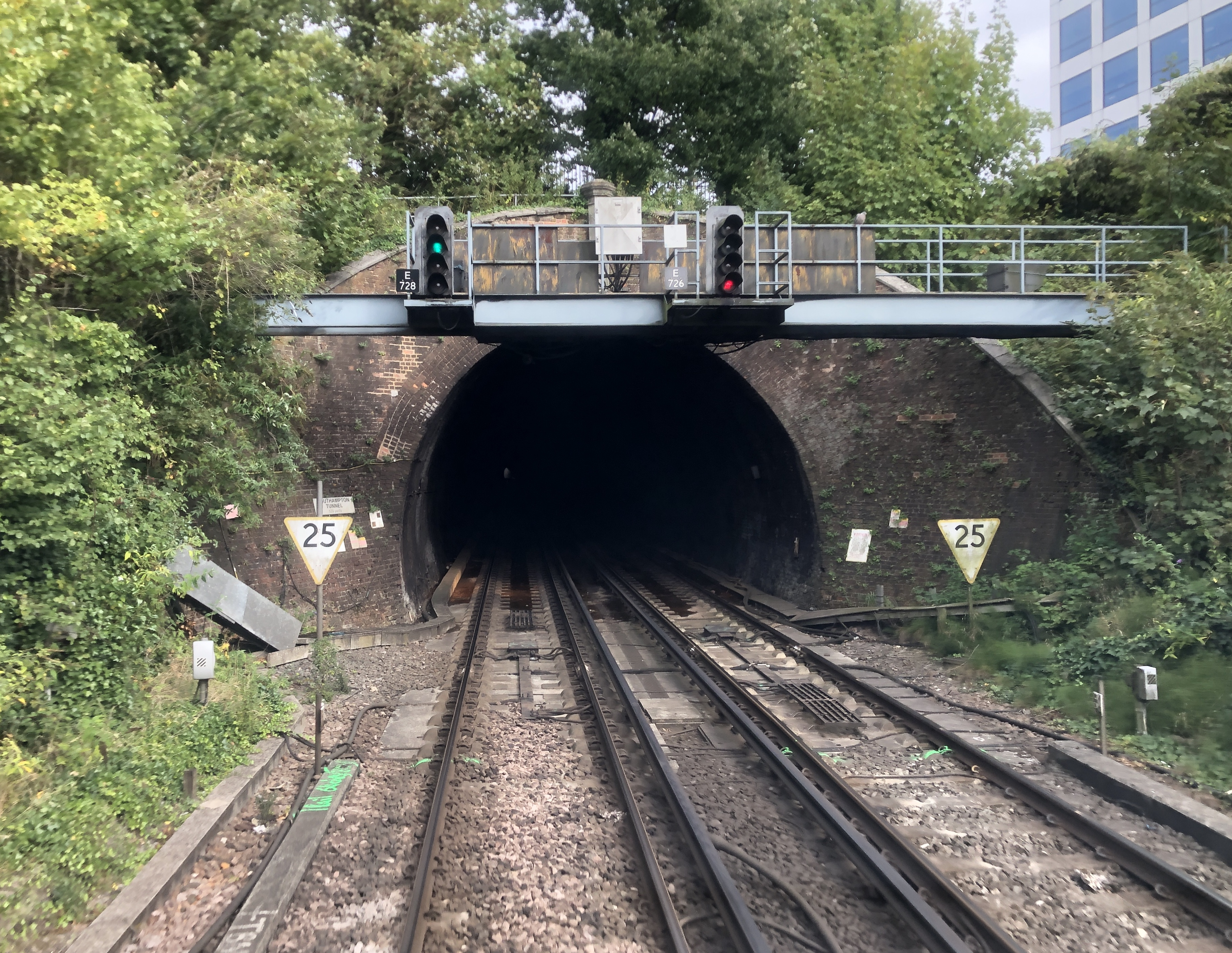
Southampton Tunnel West Portal

There is also extensive use for freight, the majority which is containers to and from the Southampton Container Terminal just to the west of Southampton Central.

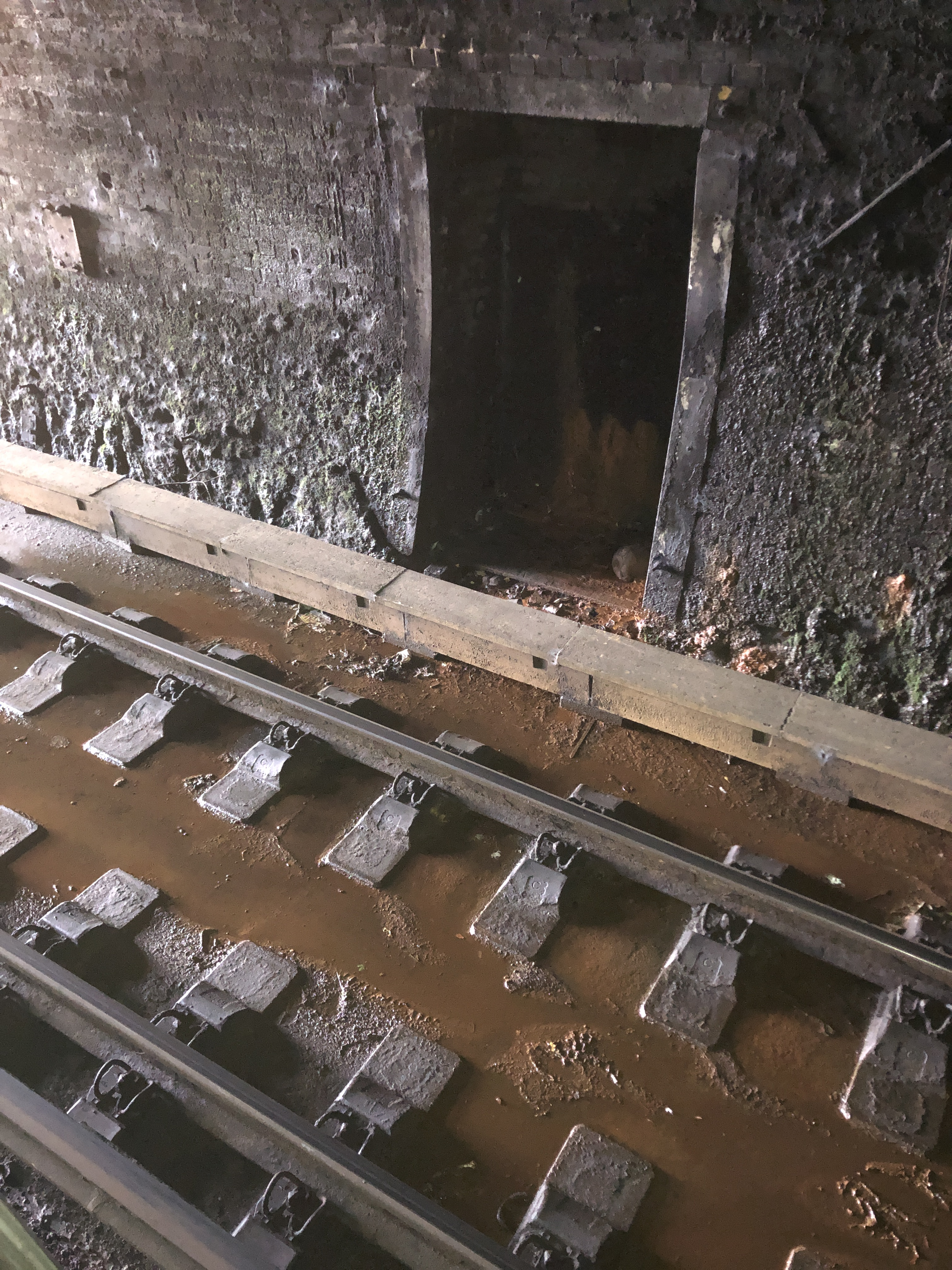
Slab track installed within the tunnel to lower rail level and increase clearances for container traffic.

== Twenty-first century redevelopment ==
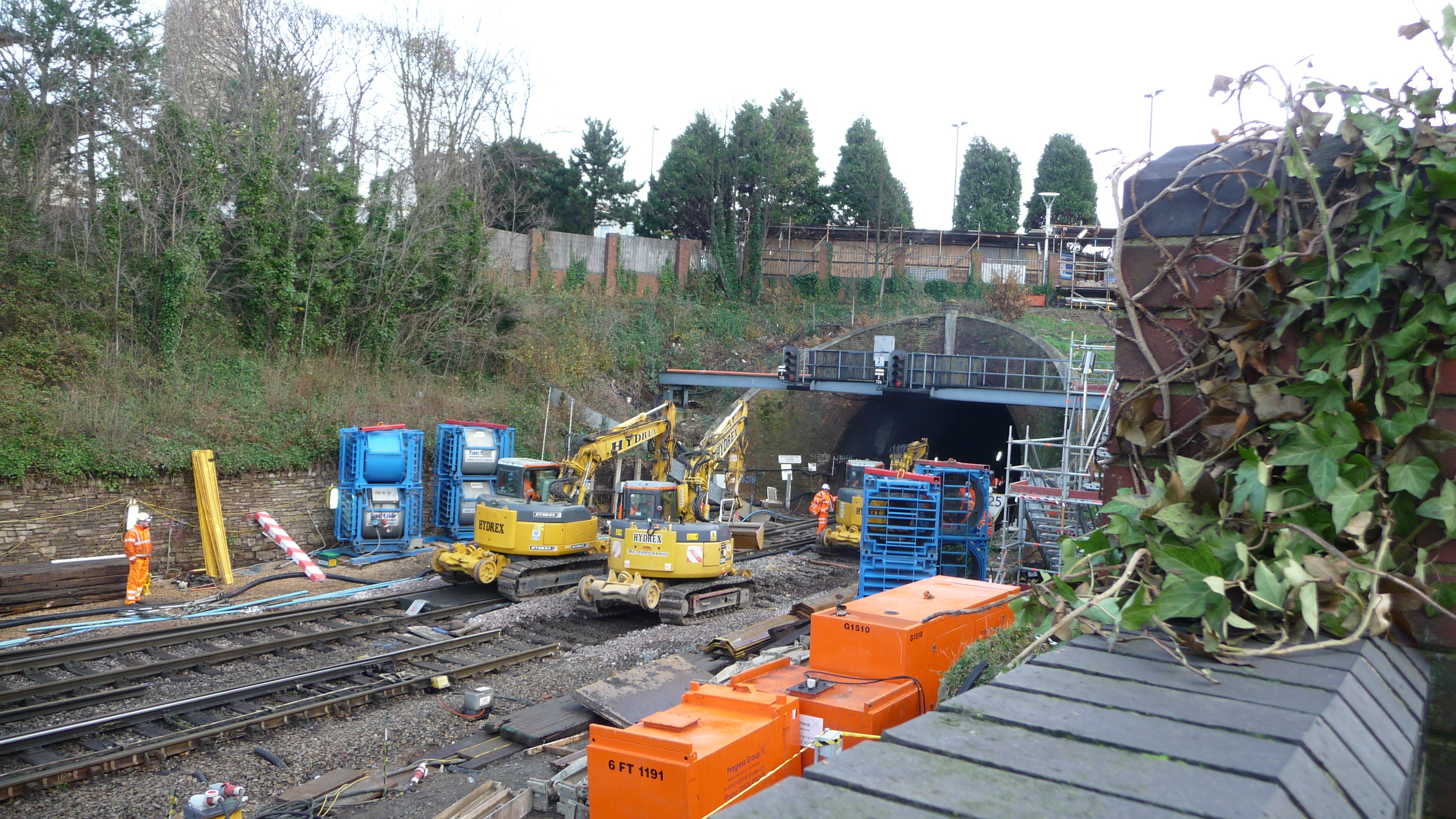
Engineering activity outside the tunnel, December 2009

Between 27 December 2009 and 3 January 2010, the tunnel was temporarily closed while it underwent reengineering work and at other times it again operated with just one track in use.

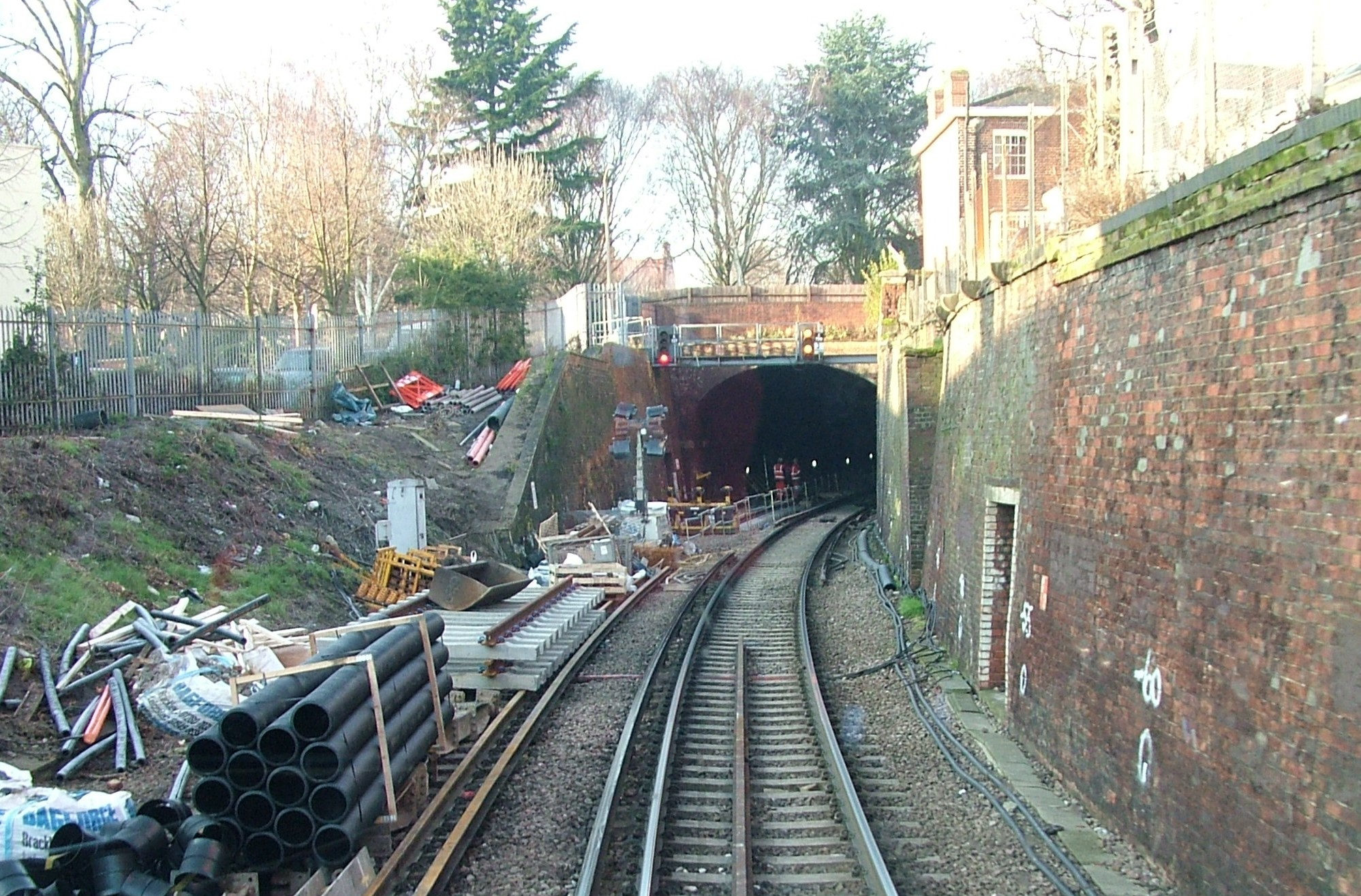
Southampton Tunnel East end during track lowering work in 2009

Inside the tunnel the track was lowered by laying the rails and their fixings directly onto a new concrete floor. This allowed the tunnel to meet the W10 (2.9m freight container) route clearance. Previously, Hi-Cube (2.9m) intermodal container traffic had to be carried on special low wagons with areas which could not be loaded, resulting in both traffic planning issues and lower train capacity. Additionally, all container trains were restricted to 20 mph when passing through the tunnel due to the limited clearances for the top edges of the loaded containers. Since rebuilding, no speed or loading restrictions apply to the tunnel and container trains can travel at up to the line speed of 40 mph, the upper limit for the tunnel; accordingly, container trains could be more easily run to and from the Port of Southampton. Network Rail projected that the scheme would see 50,000 fewer lorries on the national road network due to the increased viability of freight services as a result of the wider scheme, which was reportedly costed at £71 million.

== Film ==
Footage at the start of the film Oh, Mr Porter! features the tunnel at Southampton, filmed from the rear of the train and reversed for showing.
