= Dorchester South railway station =

Railway station in Dorset, England

Dorchester South
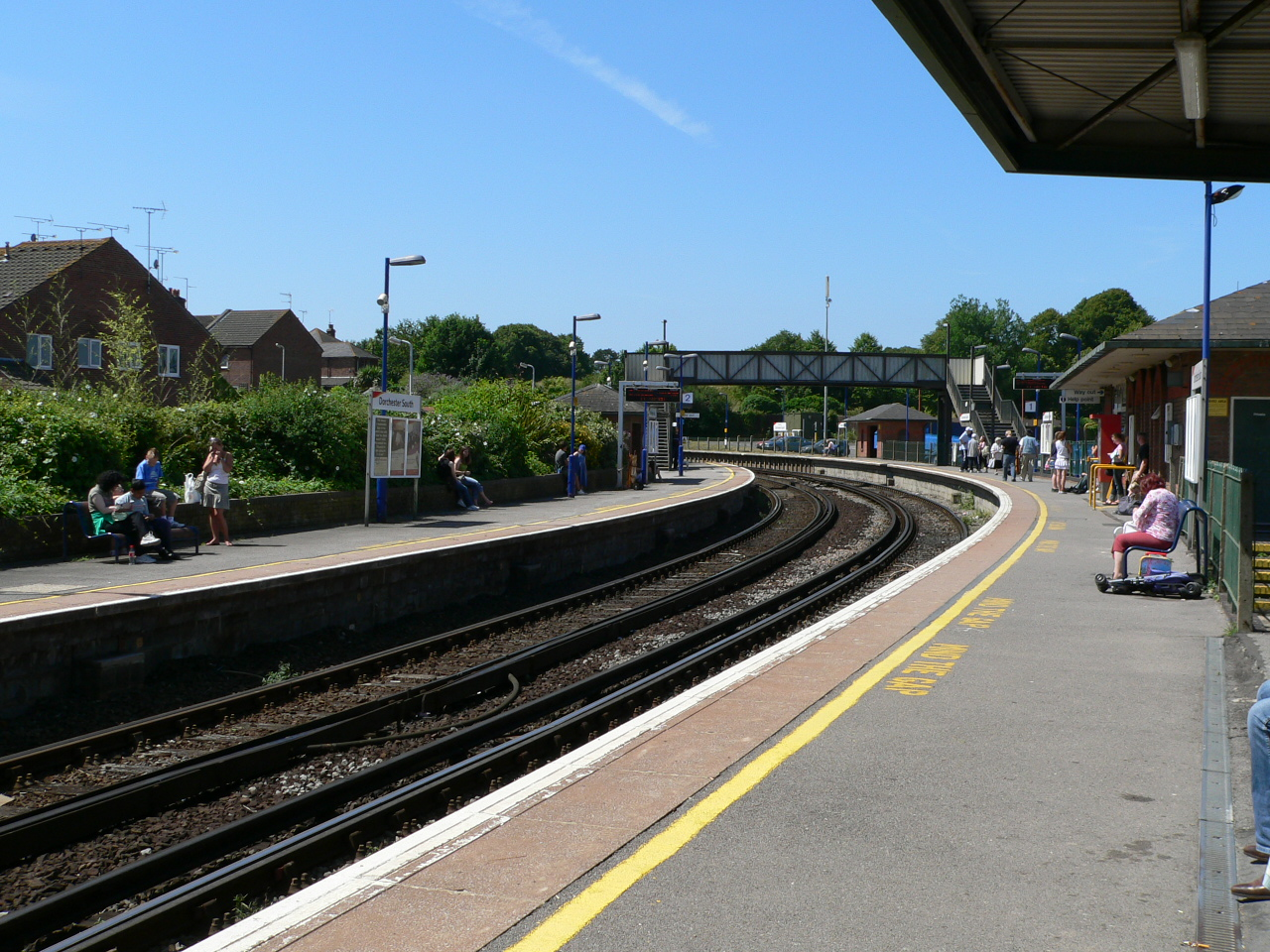
- The station in July 2005

General information
- Location: Dorchester, Dorset; England
- Coordinates: 50.709°N 2.437°W
- Grid reference: SY692900
- Manager: South Western Railway
- Platforms: 2

Other information
- Station code: DCH
- Classification: DfT category D

History
- Original company: Southampton and Dorchester Railway
- Pre-grouping: London and South Western Railway
- Post-grouping: Southern Railway

Key dates
- 1 June 1847: Terminus opened as Dorchester
- 1878: Westbound through platform opened
- 26 September 1949: Renamed Dorchester South
- 1970: Eastbound through platform opened

Passengers
- 2020/21: ▼0.107 million
- Interchange: ▼111
- 2021/22: ▲0.323 million
- Interchange: ▲343
- 2022/23: ▲0.396 million
- Interchange: ▲405
- 2023/24: ▲0.432 million
- Interchange: ▲453
- 2024/25: ▲0.466 million
- Interchange: ▲562
Location
Notes
- Passenger statistics from the Office of Rail and Road

Dorchester South is one of two railway stations that serve the town of Dorchester in Dorset, England, the other is Dorchester West. The station is on the South West Main Line and is situated 135 miles 70 chains (218.7 km) down the line from London Waterloo, (Note: Railways in the United Kingdom historically are measured in miles and chains. There are 80 chains to one mile.) between Moreton and Upwey. The station is managed by South Western Railway, who operate all trains serving it.

== History ==
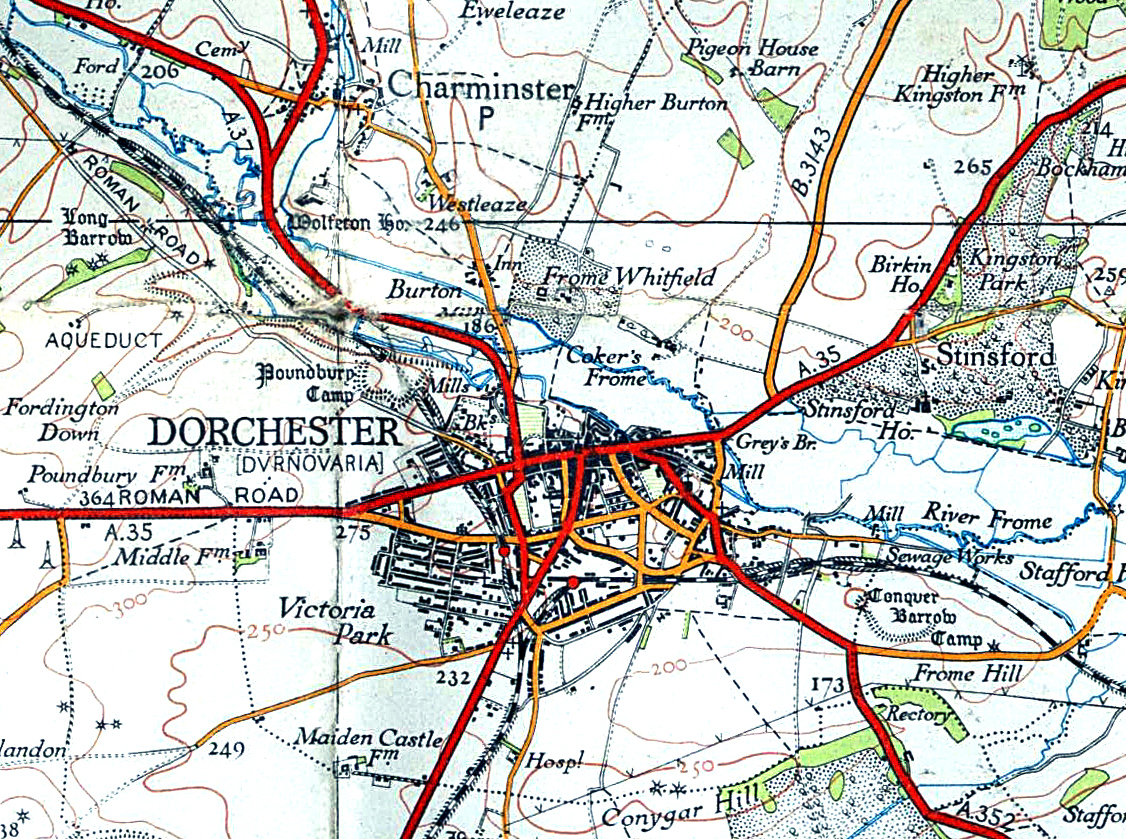
A 1937 Ordnance Survey showing the location of Dorchester South and Dorchester West

The station opened on 1 June 1847 when the Southampton and Dorchester Railway was completed. The station was built as an east facing terminus with the intent of continuing the line westwards towards Exeter. These plans were never realised, and instead another line was built from the terminus towards Weymouth. This joined with the Great Western Railway's line (now the Heart of Wessex Line) from Dorchester West and continued as a joint line to Weymouth.

Originally named Dorchester, the station was renamed Dorchester South on 26 September 1949. The station remained a terminus with trains from Bournemouth having to enter the station, reverse out back the way they came then reverse again and proceed to Weymouth. Trains from Weymouth had to pass the station, then reverse into it, and then back out. This process often caused delays and brought criticism following an accident in 1877. As a result, a curved platform was provided for southbound trains; this was brought into use during 1878. Eastbound trains still reversed into the original platform until 1970 when a platform was built on the curve. The buildings on the trackless original platform remained in use until 1989. As part of the modernisation work preparatory to electrification a new booking hall was built on the curved platform, replacing the building on the original platform which was then demolished.

=== Motive power depot ===
The Southampton and Dorchester Railway constructed a motive power depot at the station in 1847 together with a coal stage and turntable. This closed in 1957 and was demolished soon afterwards.

== Modernisation ==
During late 2010/early 2011, CCTV monitor podiums were installed on platform 1 (similar to those used on the London Underground) so as to allow the guards of each London-bound train to have a better view of the platforms (because platform 1 has a tight curve, and makes it difficult to see the length of the platform whilst a train is in the vicinity of the station). New entrances have also been constructed from the southern end of platform 1 to the adjacent car park, as well as new waiting shelters built near the new entrance and on the site of the former brick hut on platform 2.

== Services ==
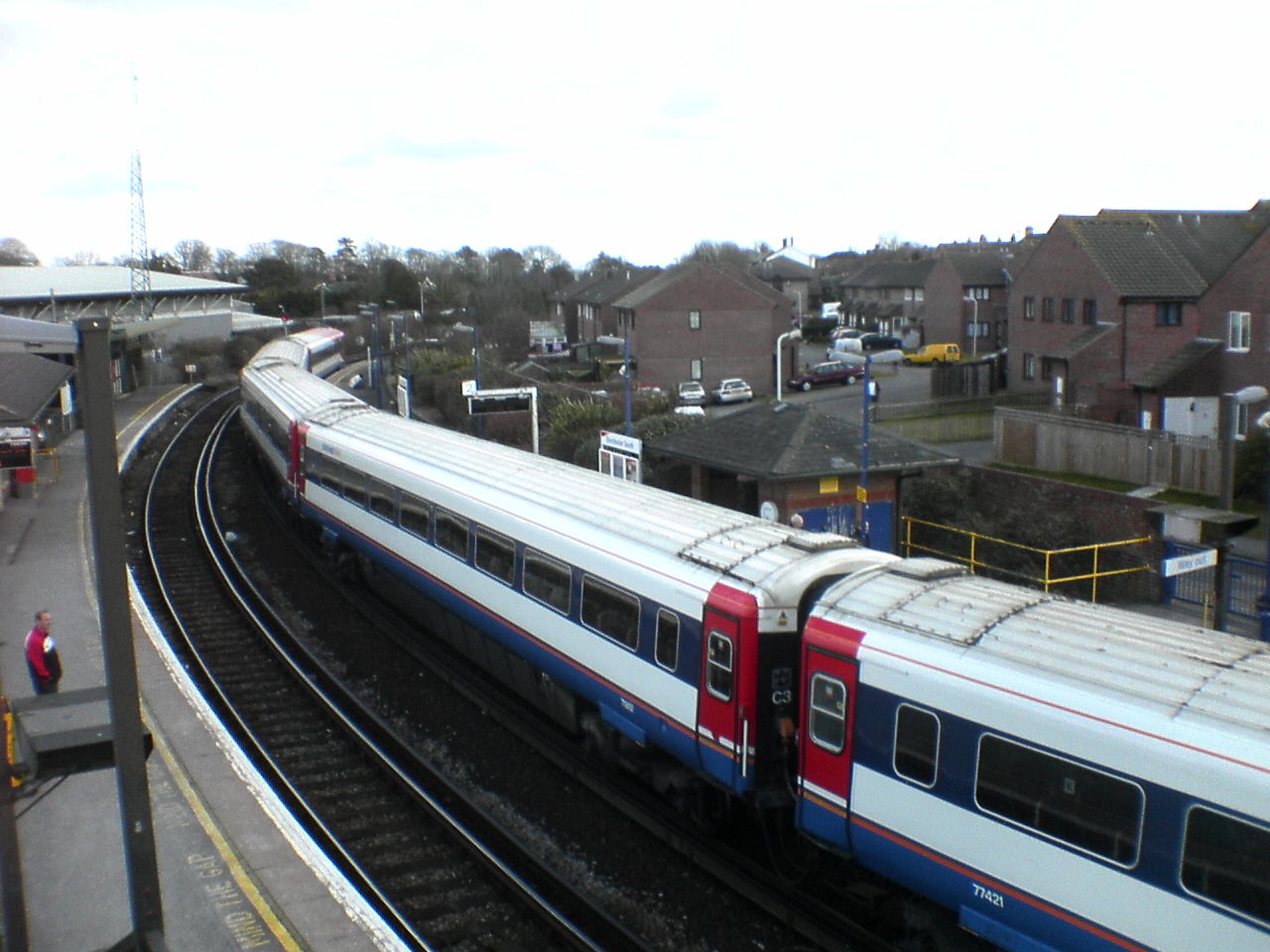
A Class 442 train from London Waterloo at Dorchester South in 2006

All services at Dorchester South are operated by South Western Railway.

On weekdays and Saturdays, the station is served by two trains per hour between London Waterloo and Weymouth.

One of these is a stopping service calling at most stops northbound to Winchester, then Basingstoke, Clapham Junction and London Waterloo. Southbound this service calls at Upwey and Weymouth.

The second is a semi-fast service calling at principal stations only northbound to Winchester, then Woking and London Waterloo. Southbound, this service runs non-stop to Weymouth.

On Sundays, the service is reduced to hourly in each direction.

A less frequent service is also available from the nearby Dorchester West station, which is served by Great Western Railway, with trains heading towards Westbury, Bristol Temple Meads and Gloucester.

Preceding station	National Rail	Following station
Moreton or Wareham	South Western Railway South West Main Line	Upwey or Weymouth
