= Moreton railway station (Dorset) =

Railway station in Dorset, England

Coordinates: 50.701°N 2.313°W

Moreton
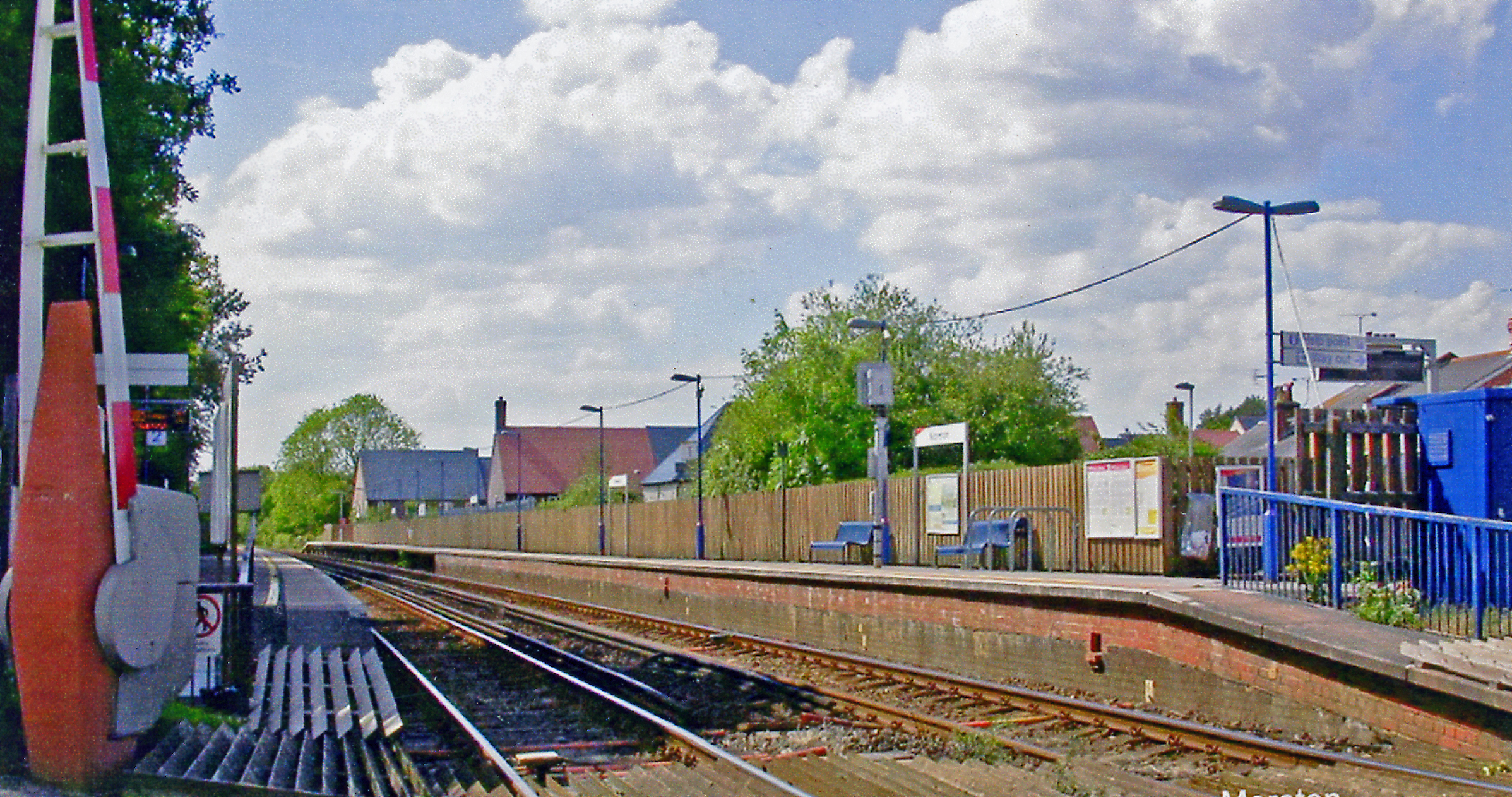
- View westward from level-crossing, towards Dorchester South and Weymouth (2007)

General information
- Location: Moreton, Dorset Council; England
- Grid reference: SY779890
- Manager: South Western Railway
- Platforms: 2

Other information
- Station code: MTN
- Classification: DfT category F2

History
- Opened: June 1847

Passengers
- 2020/21: ▼20,980
- 2021/22: ▲58,888
- 2022/23: ▲68,008
- 2023/24: ▲74,244
- 2024/25: ▲78,828
Location
Notes
- Passenger statistics from the Office of Rail and Road

Moreton railway station serves the villages of Moreton and Crossways in Dorset, England. It is operated by South Western Railway and is served by their trains between London Waterloo and Weymouth. The station is 130 miles 24 chains (209.7 km) down the line from Waterloo.

== History ==
The station was opened in June 1847 by the Southampton and Dorchester Railway. Moreton is immediately adjacent to an automatic half barrier level crossing. Like most similar situations, this used to be a manual crossing controlled by a local signal box. This was abolished in the 1960s when signals in the locality were automated. The line between Moreton and Dorchester South was singled in the 1980s, which on many occasions caused considerable delays. It is then double track from Moreton eastwards.

== Facilities ==
Both platforms have step-free access. There is a bus-stop-style shelter on both platforms, as well as dot matrix displays. There is a ticket machine and bike racks only on the eastbound platform. There is a small car park adjacent to the London-bound platform.

== Services ==
Until 1967, trains through the station were normally steam hauled. Between 1967 and 1988, passenger services were normally provided by Class 33/1 diesel locomotives with Class 438 coaching stock (also known as 4-TC units). The line was electrified in 1988, using the standard British Rail Southern Region direct current third rail at 750 volts. Class 442 electric multiple units were initially used following electrification, until being displaced by new Class 444 electric multiple units in 2007.

The station is served by an hourly South Western Railway semi-fast service in each direction between Weymouth and London Waterloo (including Sundays).

Preceding station	National Rail	Following station
Wool	South Western Railway; South West Main Line	Dorchester South

== Community Rail ==
Due to its location in Purbeck, the station is the westernmost station to be part of the Purbeck Community Rail Partnership.
