= Deaths in April 2011 =

The following is a list of notable deaths in April 2011.

Entries for each day are listed alphabetically by surname. A typical entry lists information in the following sequence:

- Name, age, country of citizenship at birth, subsequent country of citizenship (if applicable), reason for notability, cause of death (if known), and reference.

== April 2011 ==
=== 1 ===
- Peter Baumann, 75, Swiss psychiatrist.
- Lou Gorman, 82, American baseball executive and general manager (Boston Red Sox, Seattle Mariners).
- Jane Gregory, 51, British Olympic equestrian, heart attack.
- Manning Marable, 60, American professor (Columbia University).
- Edel Ojeda, 82, Mexican Olympic boxer.
- Georgi Rusev, 82, Bulgarian theatre and film actor.
- Siri Skare, 52, Norwegian lieutenant colonel, first Norwegian female military pilot.
- Varkey Vithayathil, 83, Indian Syro-Malabar Catholic hierarch, Cardinal (from 2001), Major Archbishop of Ernakulam-Angamaly (from 1999).
- Brynle Williams, 62, Welsh activist (fuel protests) and politician, AM for North Wales (from 2003).

=== 2 ===
- Richard W. Bailey, 71, American linguist.
- Larry Finch, 60, American basketball player and coach (Memphis Tigers).
- John C. Haas, 92, American businessman (Rohm and Haas), natural causes.
- Efraín Loyola, 94, Cuban flautist.
- James McNulty, 92, Canadian politician, MP for Lincoln (1962–1968) and St. Catharines (1968–1972).
- Jess Osuna, 82, American actor (Three Days of the Condor, Taps, Kramer vs. Kramer).
- Larry Parr, 64, American chess player.
- Baba Reshat, 76, Albanian religious figure, head of the Bektashi order.
- Tom Silverio, 65, Dominican-born American baseball player (California Angels).
- Bill Varney, 77, American sound editor (Raiders of the Lost Ark, The Empire Strikes Back, Back to the Future), Oscar winner (1981, 1982).
- Romeo Venturelli, 72, Italian cyclist.
- Paul Violi, 66, American poet, cancer.

=== 3 ===
- Rafique Alam, 81, Indian politician, heart attack.
- Amy Applegren, 84, American baseball player (All-American Girls Professional Baseball League).
- Lena Lovato Archuleta, 90, American educator.
- Ulli Beier, 88, German writer.
- William Henry Bullock, 83, American Roman Catholic prelate, Bishop of Des Moines (1987–1993) and Madison (1993–2003), lung cancer.
- James Martin Fitzgerald, 90, American jurist, justice of the Alaska Supreme Court (1972–1974), senior judge of the District Court for the District of Alaska (1974–2006).
- Martin Horton, 76, English cricketer.
- Kevin Jarre, 56, American screenwriter (Tombstone, Glory, The Mummy), heart failure.
- Yevgeny Lyadin, 84, Russian footballer.
- Marian Pankowski, 91, Polish writer.
- William Prusoff, 90, American pharmacologist.
- Calvin Russell, 62, American protest singer-songwriter and guitarist.
- Mandi Schwartz, 23, Canadian college ice hockey player, acute myeloid leukemia.
- Gustavo Sondermann, 29, Brazilian racing driver, race crash.
- John A. Tory, 81, Canadian lawyer and corporate executive, stroke.

=== 4 ===
- John Adler, 51, American politician, U.S. Representative from New Jersey (2009–2011), infective endocarditis.
- Scott Columbus, 54, American drummer (Manowar).
- Jackson Lago, 76, Brazilian politician, Governor of Maranhão (2007–2009), cancer.
- Ned McWherter, 80, American politician, Speaker of the Tennessee House of Representatives (1973–1987) and Governor (1987–1995), cancer.
- Juliano Mer-Khamis, 52, Israeli actor and political activist, shot.
- John Niven, 89, Scottish footballer (East Fife F.C.).
- Witta Pohl, 73, German actress.
- Wayne Robson, 64, Canadian actor (The Red Green Show, Cube, The Rescuers Down Under).
- Craig Thomas, 68, Welsh author, pneumonia.
- Juan Tuñas, 93, Cuban footballer.
- Vakur Versan, 93, Turkish jurist, professor of administrative law (Istanbul University).
- Boško Vuksanović, 83, Croatian water polo player.

=== 5 ===
- Baruch Samuel Blumberg, 85, American doctor, Nobel laureate in medicine, heart attack.
- L. J. Davis, 70, American writer.
- Heinrich Kleisli, 80, Swiss mathematician.
- John Mahoney, 61, American politician.
- Ange-Félix Patassé, 74, Central African politician, Prime Minister (1976–1978) and President (1993–2003).
- Gil Robbins, 80, American folk singer (The Highwaymen) and actor, prostate cancer.
- Larry Shepard, 92, American baseball manager (Pittsburgh Pirates) and coach (Cincinnati Reds).

=== 6 ===
- Nabi Bakhsh Baloch, 93, Pakistani scholar.
- Thøger Birkeland, 89, Danish children's book author.
- Igor Birman, 85, Russian-born American writer and economist.
- Jim Blair, 64, Scottish footballer, natural causes.
- John Bottomley, 50, Canadian singer-songwriter, suicide.
- Mike Campbell, 78, Zimbabwean farmer, challenged Robert Mugabe (Campbell v Zimbabwe), complications from torture.
- Giuseppe Comini, 88, Italian Olympic fencer.
- Joe Heap, 79, American football player (New York Giants).
- Robin Lindsay, 97, British Olympic silver medal-winning (1948) field hockey player.
- Coyote McCloud, 68, American disc jockey.
- Johnny Morris, 87, English footballer.
- Skip O'Brien, 60, American actor (CSI: Crime Scene Investigation, The Hitcher, Blow), complications from prostate cancer.
- Fritiof S. Sjöstrand, 98, Swedish physician and histologist.
- F. Gordon A. Stone, 85, British chemist.
- Sujatha, 58, Indian actress.
- Hans Tiedge, 73, German spy.

=== 7 ===
- Benedetto Aloi, 75, American mobster, natural causes.
- Bruce Cowan, 85, Australian politician, member of the House of Representatives (1980–1993).
- Edward Edwards, 77, American serial killer, natural causes.
- Hugh FitzRoy, 11th Duke of Grafton, 92, British aristocrat.
- Pierre Gauvreau, 88, Canadian painter and television screenplay writer.
- Blažena Holišová, 80, Czech film and theatre actress.
- Arthur Lessac, 101, American voice trainer.
- E. J. McGuire, 58, Canadian ice hockey coach and scout, cancer.
- Hedzer Rijpstra, 91, Dutch politician.
- Victor Surdu, 63, Romanian politician, first post-Communist Minister of Agriculture and Rural Development.

=== 8 ===
- Freda Ahenakew, 79, Canadian author and academic.
- Mario Branch, 31, American football player (Tennessee Titans, Amsterdam Admirals, Philadelphia Soul), heart failure.
- Daniel Catán, 62, Mexican composer.
- David S. Clarke, 69, Australian businessman, chairman of Macquarie Group (1985–2007), stomach cancer.
- John McCracken, 76, American sculptor.
- John Pugsley, 77, American libertarian speaker and writer.
- Donald Shanks, 70, Australian operatic bass-baritone, heart attack.
- Vasilijs Stepanovs, 83, Latvian weightlifter and Olympic silver medalist (1956 Melbourne).
- Hedda Sterne, 100, Romanian-born American painter and printmaker.
- Elena Zuasti, 75, Uruguayan stage actress and comedian, heart failure.

=== 9 ===
- Zakariya Rashid Hassan al-Ashiri, 40, Bahraini blogger and journalist, beaten.
- Pierre Celis, 86, Belgian brewer (Celis), cancer.
- Robert Coleman-Senghor, 71, American English professor, torn aorta.
- Chip Fairway, 38, American wrestler.
- Nicholas Goodhart, 91, British marine engineer and glider pilot.
- Jerry Lawson, 70, American videogame console engineer.
- Sidney Lumet, 86, American film director (12 Angry Men, Dog Day Afternoon, Network), lymphoma.
- Roger Nichols, 66, American sound engineer and record producer (Steely Dan), pancreatic cancer.
- Yolande Palfrey, 54, British actress (Blake's 7, Doctor Who), brain tumour.
- Geoff Smale, 86, New Zealand yacht racer, plane crash.
- Orrin Tucker, 100, American orchestra leader.
- Randy Wood, 94, American record producer, founder of Dot Records.

=== 10 ===
- Bill Brill, 79, American sportswriter and newspaper editor, esophageal cancer.
- Violet Cowden, 94, American pilot, member of Women Airforce Service Pilots during World War II, heart failure.
- Don Merton, 72, New Zealand conservationist.
- Mikhail Rusyayev, 46, Russian footballer.
- Bob Shaw, 89, American football player (Los Angeles Rams).
- Homer Smith, 79, American football coach (Army Black Knights), cancer.
- Phil Solomon, 86, Northern Irish music executive.
- Francis E. Sweeney, 77, American jurist, Ohio Supreme Court justice (1993–2004).
- Stephen Watson, 56, South African writer and critic, cancer.

=== 11 ===
- Billy Bang, 63, American jazz violinist, lung cancer.
- Lewis Binford, 80, American archaeologist, heart failure.
- Jimmy Briggs, 74, Scottish footballer (Dundee United).
- Akis Cleanthous, 47, Cypriot politician, chairman of the Stock Exchange (2003–2007), Minister of Education and Culture (2007–2008), heart attack.
- John D'Orazio, 55, Australian politician, member of the Western Australian Legislative Assembly for Ballajura (2001–2008), heart attack during surgery.
- La Esterella, 91, Belgian Flemish singer.
- Billy Gray, 83, English footballer (Nottingham Forest).
- Murtaza Hassan, 56-57, Pakistani stage comedian, hepatitis and liver cancer.
- Sir John Lowther, 87, British public servant, Lord Lieutenant of Northamptonshire (1984–1998).
- Sir Simon Milton, 49, British politician, London Deputy Mayor for Policy and Planning, after short illness.
- Doug Newlands, 79, Scottish footballer (Aberdeen, Burnley).
- Jørgen Munk Plum, 85, Danish Olympic athlete.
- Peter Ruehl, 64, American-born Australian columnist.
- Igor Runov, 48, Russian volleyball player, Olympic silver medalist (1988).
- Angela Scoular, 65, British actress, suicide by acid ingestion.
- Larry Sweeney, 30, American professional wrestler and manager, suicide by hanging.
- Eric Wall, 95, British Anglican bishop, Bishop of Huntingdon (1972–1980).

=== 12 ===
- Roy Ananny, 86, Canadian football player.
- Albert Bachmann, 81, Swiss military intelligence officer.
- Sachin Bhowmick, 80, Indian screenwriter, heart attack.
- Lee Bradley Brown, 39, British tourist, died in police custody in Dubai.
- Ronnie Coyle, 46, Scottish footballer (Celtic, Raith Rovers), leukemia.
- Sidney Harman, 92, American businessman and publisher (Newsweek), acute myeloid leukemia.
- Eddie Joost, 94, American baseball player and manager (Philadelphia Athletics, Cincinnati Reds).
- Robert Lokossimbayé, 35, Chadian footballer.
- Aleksandar Petaković, 81, Serbian football player.
- Jānis Polis, 72, Latvian pharmacologist, discovered rimantadine.
- Ioan Șișeștean, 74, Romanian Catholic hierarch, Bishop of Maramureş (since 1994).
- Désiré Tagro, 52, Ivorian politician, Interior Minister, chief of staff for Laurent Gbagbo, shot.
- Miroslav Tichý, 84, Czech photographer.

=== 13 ===
- Danny Fiszman, 66, British football director (Arsenal), cancer.
- Buster Martin, 104?, French-born British longevity claimant.
- Seeta bint Abdul Aziz, 80, Saudi royal, sister of King Abdullah, after long illness.

=== 14 ===
- Rosihan Anwar, 88, Indonesian journalist, heart failure.
- Trevor Bannister, 76, British actor (Are You Being Served?, Last of the Summer Wine, The Dustbinmen), heart attack.
- Walter Breuning, 114, American supercentenarian, world's fifth oldest man ever.
- George Brookes, 76, Australian politician, member of the Tasmanian Legislative Council (1991–1997).
- Jon Cedar, 80, American actor (Hogan's Heroes), leukemia.
- Patrick Cullinan, 77, South African writer.
- Louis Dufaux, 79, French Roman Catholic prelate, Bishop of Grenoble (1989–2006).
- Bernie Flowers, 81, American football player (Baltimore Colts).
- Joe Dan Gold, 68, American college basketball coach (Mississippi State).
- Jean Gratton, 86, Canadian Roman Catholic prelate, Bishop of Mont-Laurier (1978–2001).
- Cyrus Harvey Jr., 85, American entrepreneur, stroke.
- William Lipscomb, 91, American chemist, pneumonia.
- Arthur Marx, 89, American writer, son of Groucho Marx.
- Rami Reddy, 52, Indian actor, kidney failure.

=== 15 ===
- Vittorio Arrigoni, 36, Italian activist, hanged.
- Babu Baral, 47, Pakistani comedian, cancer.
- Reno Bertoia, 76, Italian-born Canadian baseball player (Detroit Tigers, Minnesota Twins), lymphoma.
- Walter Brown, 85, Australian Olympic bronze medal-winning (1956) canoer.
- William Cook, 80, American entrepreneur, philanthropist and historic preservationist, heart failure.
- Hélio Gueiros, 85, Brazilian politician, Governor of Pará (1987–1991), Mayor of Belém (1993–1996), renal disease.
- Michael Hurley, 87, Irish Jesuit and ecumenical theologian, co-founder of the Irish School of Ecumenics.
- Hans Kohler, 81, Swiss Olympic weightlifter.
- Vincenzo La Scola, 53, Italian tenor, heart attack.
- Bobo Osborne, 75, American baseball player (Detroit Tigers).
- Beryl Shipley, 84, American basketball coach (University of Louisiana at Lafayette, San Diego Conquistadors).
- E. T. York, 88, American agronomist, educator and presidential adviser.

=== 16 ===
- Gerry Alexander, 82, Jamaican cricketer.
- Bijan, 67, Iranian-born American fashion designer, stroke.
- Allan Blakeney, 85, Canadian politician, Premier of Saskatchewan (1971–1982), complications from liver cancer.
- Auguste Caulet, 84, French Olympic boxer.
- Chinesinho, 76, Brazilian footballer, Alzheimer's disease.
- Stanley Glenn, 84, American baseball player and executive (Negro league baseball).
- Bjørn Oscar Gulbrandsen, 85, Norwegian Olympic ice hockey player and sailor.
- Bill Kinnamon, 91, American Major League Baseball umpire.
- Serge LeClerc, 61, Canadian pardoned criminal and politician, MLA for Saskatoon Northwest (2007–2010), complications from colon and bowel cancer.
- Alfonso Martínez, 74, Spanish Olympic basketball player
- Tadeusz Pawlusiak, 64, Polish Olympic ski jumper.
- William A. Rusher, 87, American columnist, publisher of National Review (1957–1988).
- Dan Monroe Russell Jr., 98, American senior (former chief) judge of the District Court for the Southern District of Mississippi, natural causes.
- Sol Saks, 100, American television writer (Bewitched, My Favorite Husband, Mr. Adams and Eve).
- Hermod Skånland, 85, Norwegian Central Bank governor (1985–1993).
- Harold Volkmer, 80, American politician, U.S. Representative from Missouri (1977–1997), pneumonia.

=== 17 ===
- Nasser Al-Kharafi, 67, Kuwaiti businessman (M. A. Kharafi & Sons), heart attack.
- James S. Albus, 75, American engineer.
- Bob Block, 89, British comedy writer (Rentaghost, Life with The Lyons).
- Joel Colton, 92, American historian, heart failure.
- Osamu Dezaki, 67, Japanese animator (Space Adventure Cobra, Tomorrow's Joe), lung cancer.
- Alfred Freedman, 94, American psychiatrist, led American Psychiatric Association to declassify homosexuality as a mental illness, complications following hip surgery.
- Eric Gross, 84, Austrian-born Australian composer.
- Alan Haines, 86, British actor.
- Wolfram Koppen, 72, German Olympic judoka.
- Josefa Köster, 92, German Olympic sprint canoer.
- Eddie Leadbeater, 83, English cricketer.
- Oldřich Lomecký, 90, Czech Olympic sprint canoer.
- Blair Milan, 29, Australian actor and television presenter, acute myeloid leukaemia.
- Nikos Papazoglou, 63, Greek singer-songwriter, cancer.
- AJ Perez, 18, Filipino actor, traffic accident.
- Raúl Sánchez Díaz Martell, 96, Mexican politician, Governor of Baja California (1965–1971).
- Michael Sarrazin, 70, Canadian actor (They Shoot Horses, Don't They?, The Flim-Flam Man, For Pete's Sake), cancer.
- Bhawani Singh, 79, Indian noble, titular Maharaja of Jaipur (since 1970).
- Dennis E. Stowell, 66, American politician, member of the Utah State Senate (2007–2011), cancer.
- Ken Taylor, 88, British television scriptwriter (The Jewel in the Crown).
- Lynne Topping, 61, American actress.
- Robert Vickrey, 84, American artist.
- Victor Ward, 87, Canadian miner, survivor of the 1956 Springhill Mine disaster.

=== 18 ===
- Olubayo Adefemi, 25, Nigerian footballer, car accident.
- Sadiq Ali, 58, Indian politician.
- Pietro Ferrero Jr., 47, Italian businessman (Ferrero SpA), bicycle accident.
- Kjell Håkonsen, 75, Norwegian harness racer and trainer.
- Bob Plant, 95, British soldier, recipient of the Military Cross.
- Mason Rudolph, 76, American golfer.
- Giovanni Saldarini, 86, Italian cardinal, Archbishop of Turin (1989–1999), natural causes.
- William Donald Schaefer, 89, American politician, Governor of Maryland (1987–1995), pneumonia.
- Israpil Velijanov, 42, Russian Dagastani militant leader.
- Ivica Vidović, 72, Croatian actor.
- Kim Yu-ri, 21, South Korean fashion model, apparent suicide by poisoning.

=== 19 ===
- Anne Blonstein, 52, British poet.
- Lynn Chandnois, 86, American football player (Pittsburgh Steelers).
- Lisa Head, 29, British soldier, improvised explosive device.
- Richard P. Klocko, 96, American Air Force lieutenant general.
- Jeanne M. Leiby, 46, American writer and magazine editor, car accident.
- Norm Masters, 77, American football player (Green Bay Packers), cancer.
- Aage Møst, 87, Norwegian sports official, President of the Norwegian Athletics Association (1956–1965).
- Serge Nubret, 72, French bodybuilder and actor (Pumping Iron).
- Elisabeth Sladen, 65, British actress (Doctor Who, The Sarah Jane Adventures, Coronation Street), pancreatic cancer.
- Grete Waitz, 57, Norwegian marathon former world record holder, 1983 world champion and Olympic silver medallist (1984), cancer.

=== 20 ===
- Allan Brown, 84, Scottish football player and manager (Blackpool, Scotland).
- Tim Hetherington, 40, British photojournalist and filmmaker (Restrepo), mortar attack.
- Rudolf Hilf, 83, German historian, political scientist and expellee politician.
- Chris Hondros, 41, American photojournalist, mortar attack.
- Osvaldo Miranda, 95, Argentine actor (Cita en las estrellas).
- Patricia Ofori, 29, Ghanaian international footballer (2003 & 2007 FIFA Women's World Cup), traffic collision.
- Madelyn Pugh, 90, American television writer (I Love Lucy, The Mothers-in-Law) and producer (Alice).
- Tul Bahadur Pun Magar, 88, Nepali World War II veteran, recipient of the Victoria Cross, cardiac complications.
- Ted Quillin, 81, American radio personality.
- Hubert Schlafly, 91, American engineer, co-inventor of the TelePrompter.
- Kerry Smith, 58, New Zealand actress and broadcaster, melanoma.
- Erwin Strahl, 82, Austrian actor.

=== 21 ===
- Javier Adúriz, 63, Argentine poet.
- Beverly Barton, 64, American romance author, heart failure.
- Marie-Jeanne Bozzi, 55, French politician and convicted criminal, twice mayor of Grosseto-Prugna, shot.
- Tine Bryld, 71, Danish social worker, writer, radio host and letters editor.
- Annalisa Ericson, 97, Swedish actress (Summer Interlude).
- Helen J. Frye, 80, American federal judge, after long illness.
- Reginald C. Fuller, 102, British Roman Catholic priest and author.
- Harold Garfinkel, 93, American sociologist.
- W. J. Gruffydd, 94, Welsh poet.
- Catharina Halkes, 90, Dutch theologian and feminist
- Jim Heise, 80, American baseball player (Washington Senators), complications from surgery.
- Jess Stonestreet Jackson Jr., 81, American wine entrepreneur, founder of Kendall-Jackson, cancer.
- Ken Kostick, 57, Canadian cooking show host (What's for Dinner?), complications from pancreatitis.
- Max Mathews, 84, American engineer and computer music composer, complications from pneumonia.
- Muhannad, 41, Saudi al Qaeda fighter in Chechnya, shot.
- Yoshiko Tanaka, 55, Japanese actress (Godzilla vs. Biollante) and singer (Candies), breast cancer.
- Walter van de Walle, 88, Canadian politician, MP for Pembina (1986–1988) and St. Albert (1988–1993).

=== 22 ===
- Anthony Abrahams, 87, British barrister and educationalist.
- Moin Akhter, 60, Pakistani actor and comedian, heart attack.
- Patrick Billingsley, 85, American mathematician and actor.
- Cheung Sai Ho, 35, Hong Kong footballer, suicide by jumping.
- Wiel Coerver, 86, Dutch footballer and manager.
- Eldon Davis, 94, American architect, creator of Googie architecture, founder of Armet & Davis.
- Hazel Dickens, 85, American bluegrass singer.
- Madhav Gudi, 70, Indian Hindustani classical vocalist.
- Siarhei Lahun, 22, Belarusian weightlifter, car accident.
- Sidney Michaels, 83, American playwright and screenwriter (The Night They Raided Minsky's), Alzheimer's disease.
- Merle Greene Robertson, 97, American artist and archeologist.
- José Antonio Torres Martinó, 94, Puerto Rican painter and writer, after long illness.
- João Maria Tudela, 81, Portuguese singer.

=== 23 ===
- Mushtaq Ahmad, 82, Pakistani Olympic gold medal-winning (1960) field hockey player.
- Ed Austin, 84, American attorney and politician, Mayor of Jacksonville, Florida (1991–1995).
- Dmytro Blazheyovskyi, 100, Ukrainian priest, historian and embroiderer.
- Ghafoor Butt, 74, Pakistani cricketer and umpire.
- James Casey, 88, British comedian.
- Bill Flynn, 59, Australian politician, member of the Legislative Assembly of Queensland for Lockyer (2001–2004), parliamentary leader of One Nation (2001–2004).
- Sid Fournet, 78, American football player (New York Jets, Pittsburgh Steelers).
- David Hackett, 84, American government official (President's Committee on Juvenile Delinquency and Youth Crime, 1961–1964), complications of diabetes.
- Tom King, 68, American guitarist and songwriter (The Outsiders), heart failure.
- Peter Li Hongye, 91, Chinese underground Roman Catholic prelate, clandestine bishop of Luoyang.
- Peter Lieberson, 64, American composer, complications of lymphoma.
- Terence Longdon, 88, British actor.
- Huey P. Meaux, 82, American record producer.
- Milorad Bata Mihailović, 88, Serbian painter.
- Noxolo Nogwaza, 24, South African lesbian activist, stabbed.
- Norio Ohga, 81, Japanese businessman, president and CEO of Sony, multiple organ failure.
- Ready Teddy, 23, New Zealand eventing horse, complications from colic.
- Geoffrey Russell, 4th Baron Ampthill, 89, British politician.
- Mohammad Abdus Sattar, 85, Indian Olympic footballer, pneumonia.
- Phillip Shriver, 88, American historian and college administrator.
- Max van der Stoel, 86, Dutch politician and diplomat, Minister of Foreign Affairs (1973–1977, 1981–1982).
- John Sullivan, 64, British writer (Only Fools and Horses), viral pneumonia.
- Dutch Tilders, 69, Australian blues musician, cancer.

=== 24 ===
- Otto Amen, 98, American politician.
- Sathya Sai Baba, 84, Indian spiritual guru, founder of the Sathya Sai Organization, multiple organ failure.
- Nawang Gombu, 74, Tibetan-born Indian mountaineer, after short illness.
- Peter Green, 91, Canadian Olympic rower.
- Alimirah Hanfare, 95, Ethiopian sultan of the Aussa Sultanate.
- José López, 88, Chilean footballer
- Sir Denis Mahon, 100, British art historian and philanthropist.
- Madame Nhu, 87, South Vietnamese First Lady (1955–1963), after short illness.
- Joan Peyser, 80, American musicologist, after heart surgery.
- Marie-France Pisier, 66, French actress (The Other Side of Midnight), drowning.
- Colin Snedden, 93, New Zealand cricketer.

=== 25 ===
- Winrich Behr, 93, German World War II Panzer captain, recipient of the Knight's Cross of the Iron Cross.
- Ira Cohen, 76, American poet, renal failure.
- John Cooke, 89, British air marshal.
- William Craig, 86, Northern Irish politician, founder of Vanguard Unionist Progressive Party, MP for Belfast East (1974–1979).
- Abdoulaye Hamani Diori, 65, Nigerien politician, after long illness.
- María Isbert, 94, Spanish actress.
- Lawrence Lee, 101, British stained glass artist.
- Ryszard Nawrocki, 71, Polish actor and voice actor.
- Joe Perry, 84, American football player (San Francisco 49ers), member of the Pro Football Hall of Fame.
- Poly Styrene, 53, British musician (X-Ray Spex), breast cancer.
- Gonzalo Rojas, 93, Chilean poet.
- Güven Sazak, 76, Turkish businessman, chairman of Fenerbahçe S.K. (1993–1994).
- Minoru Tanaka, 44, Japanese actor (Ultraman Mebius & Ultraman Brothers, Kamen Rider W Returns – Kamen Rider Accel), suspected suicide by hanging.
- Avraham Tiar, 87, Israeli politician, member of the Knesset (1961–1969).
- Bobby Thompson, 57, American baseball player (Texas Rangers).
- Elizabeth Wicken, 83, Canadian baseball player (All-American Girls Professional Baseball League).

=== 26 ===
- Vic Atkinson, 90, Australian footballer.
- Douglas Chaffee, 75, American artist.
- John Cossette, 54, American television producer (Grammy Awards).
- Roger Gimbel, 86, American Emmy Award-winning television producer (Chernobyl: The Final Warning, S.O.S. Titanic), pneumonia.
- Lynn Hauldren, 89, American copywriter and product spokesperson (Empire Carpet).
- José María Izuzquiza Herranz, 85, Spanish-born Peruvian Roman Catholic prelate, Vicar Apostolic of Jaén en Peru (1987–2001).
- Sir Henry Leach, 87, British admiral.
- Jim Mandich, 62, American football player and announcer (Miami Dolphins), bile duct cancer.
- Don Miles, 75, American baseball player (Los Angeles Dodgers).
- Islwyn Morris, 90, Welsh actor.
- Sadler's Wells, 30, American racehorse and sire.
- Phoebe Snow, 60, American singer-songwriter ("Poetry Man"), brain hemorrhage.
- Hector Sutherland, 81, Australian cyclist.
- Samuel Zoll, 76, American jurist and politician, Mayor of Salem, Massachusetts (1970–1973), gallbladder cancer.

=== 27 ===
- Orlando Bosch, 84, Cuban exile, after long illness.
- Ibrahim Coulibaly, 47, Ivorian militia leader.
- Paul Vincent Donovan, 86, American Roman Catholic prelate, Bishop of Kalamazoo (1971–1994).
- Jack H. Goaslind, 83, American leader in the Church of Jesus Christ of Latter-day Saints.
- Igor Kon, 82, Russian philosopher, psychologist and sexologist.
- Rafael Menjívar Ochoa, 51, Salvadoran writer, journalist and translator, cancer.
- Marian Mercer, 75, American actress (It's a Living), complications from Alzheimer's disease.
- Mel Pearce, 83, Australian Olympic hockey player.
- Dag Stokke, 44, Norwegian keyboardist (TNT), church organist and mastering engineer, cancer.
- Harold Schnitzer, 87, American philanthropist and company executive of Schnitzer Steel (now Radius Recycling), cancer.
- Harry Thuillier, 88, Irish Olympic fencer and radio presenter.
- Yvette Vickers, 81–82, American actress (Attack of the 50 Foot Woman), singer and model (Playboy). (body discovered on this date)
- Willem Albert Wagenaar, 69, Dutch psychologist.
- Michael Waltman, 64, American actor (Beyond the Law, Tower of Terror, National Lampoon's Van Wilder).
- David Wilkerson, 79, American Christian evangelist and author (The Cross and the Switchblade), car accident.

=== 28 ===
- Enrique Arancibia Clavel, 66, Chilean DINA agent.
- William Campbell, 87, American actor (Love Me Tender, Star Trek, Dementia 13).
- Gene Fekete, 88, American football player (Cleveland Browns).
- Erhard Loretan, 52, Swiss mountaineer, third climber to scale all 14 eight-thousanders, climbing accident.
- Willie O'Neill, 70, Scottish football player (Celtic).
- E. Earl Patton, 83, American businessman and politician, tornado.

=== 29 ===
- Waldemar Baszanowski, 75, Polish weightlifter.
- Robert B. Duncan, 90, American politician, U.S. Representative from Oregon (1963–1967, 1975–1981).
- Asker Dzhappuyev, 40, Russian militant leader (Yarmuk Jamaat), shot.
- Salim Ghazal, 79, Syrian-born Lebanese Melkite Catholic hierarch, Curial bishop of Antioch for Melkites (2001–2005).
- Abdul Hameed, 83, Pakistani writer and novelist.
- Jeff Kargola, 27, American freestyle motocross rider, race accident.
- Vladimir Krainev, 67, Russian pianist, People's Artist of the USSR, aortic aneurysm.
- David Mason, 85, British trumpeter, played trumpet solo on "Penny Lane", leukemia.
- Siamak Pourzand, 79, Iranian journalist and dissident, suicide by jumping.
- Joanna Russ, 74, American science fiction author, following a series of strokes.
- Walter Santoro, 89, Uruguayan politician, Minister of Industry (1963–1964), natural causes.
- Ratmir Shameyev, 22, Kabardin militant, shot.

=== 30 ===
- Ronald Asmus, 53, American diplomat and political analyst, cancer.
- Saif al-Arab Gaddafi, 28–29, Libyan soldier, son of Muammar Gaddafi, airstrike.
- Pete Gray, 30, Australian environmental activist, bowel cancer.
- Richard Holmes, 65, British military historian.
- Dorjee Khandu, 56, Indian Chief Minister of Arunachal Pradesh (since 2007), helicopter crash.
- Mike Krsnich, 79, American baseball player (Milwaukee Braves).
- Francis Lü Shouwang, 45, Chinese Roman Catholic Bishop of Yichang, pancreatitis.
- Anthony Francis Mestice, 87, American Roman Catholic prelate, Auxiliary Bishop of New York (1973–2001).
- Harry S. Morgan, 65, German pornographic actor, producer and director. (body found on this date)
- Millito Navarro, 105, Puerto Rican Negro league baseball player.
- Evald Okas, 95, Estonian painter.
- Daniel Quillen, 70, American mathematician.
- Ernesto Sabato, 99, Argentine writer (The Tunnel, On Heroes and Tombs), pneumonia.
- Edgar Seymour, 98, American Olympic bobsledder.
- Apostolos Santas, 89, Greek Resistance veteran.
- Jurij Sliachtecov, 21, Lithuanian student, missing person, suicide.
- Eddie Turnbull, 88, Scottish football player and manager.
