= Veinticinco de agosto, 1983 =

Veinticinco de agosto, 1983 (August the 25th, 1983) is a chamber opera by Juan María Solare, to a Spanish libretto by Javier Adúriz based on the life of Jorge Luis Borges. Solare composed the opera from 1992 to 1993. The opera is approximately 37.5 minutes in length and consists of one act with fifteen scenes.

== Characters ==
- Old Borges (bass)
- Young Borges (tenor)
- Speaker (baritone or tenor)
- Owner of the hotel (baritone or bass)
- Chorus

== Orchestra ==
- Flute
- Tenor Saxophone
- String Quartet
- Piano
- Percussion (Suspended cymbal, 2 anvils, glockenspiel, vibraphone, 5 temple blocks, 3 tomtoms, tenor drum)
