= Michel Mouïsse =

French Catholic bishop

His Eminence Michel-Pierre-Marie Mouïsse
- Church: Catholic Church
- See: Bishop of Diocese of Périgueux and Sarlat (emeritus)
- In office: Bishop of the Diocese of Périgueux and Sarlat
- Predecessor: Gaston Poulain
- Successor: Philippe Mousset
- Previous post: Auxiliary bishop of Grenoble (2000-2004) Titular bishop of Lambæsis (2000-2004)

Orders
- Ordination: December 18, 1966
- Consecration: May 7, 2000 by Louis Dufaux

Personal details
- Born: Michel-Pierre-Marie Mouïsse; October 31, 1939 (age 86) Mazamet (Tarn)
- Denomination: Roman Catholic
- Motto: Servir, ne pas être servi
- Coat of arms

Michel Mouïsse (born October 31, 1939, in Mazamet, Tarn) is a French Catholic bishop.

After his formation for the priesthood at the regional seminary of Toulouse in the 1960s, Michel Mouïsse was ordained a priest for the diocese of Albi on December 18, 1966. He began his career as a diocesan chaplain for several Catholic youth movements, then trained seminarians in Toulouse before moving on to various diocesan positions in the 1980s and 1990s.

After being appointed auxiliary bishop of Grenoble and titular bishop of Lambæsis on March 10, 2000, Michel Mouïsse was consecrated bishop on May 7 by Louis Dufaux. However, he left this position on March 5, 2004, when he was appointed bishop of the Diocese of Périgueux and Sarlat. Later, in 2014, as bishop emeritus of the Diocese, he joined the team of priests of the Notre-Dame-de-la-Garde in Marseille.

== Biography ==
=== Youth and formation ===
Michel Pierre Marie Mouïsse was born on October 31, 1939, in Mazamet, and was the oldest child of Julien Mouïsse, a woodworker, and Suzanne Hiriar.

He studied at the Notre Dame primary school in Mazamet, the collège in Barral de Castres, the lycée at Saint-Théodard in Montauban, where he obtained his baccalauréat, and then at the University of Toulouse.

In 1960, Michel Mouïsse entered the seminary of Albi until 1964. After his military service, he continued his formation for the priesthood at the major seminary in Toulouse.

He was ordained a priest for the Diocese of Albi on December 18, 1966.

=== Clerical life ===
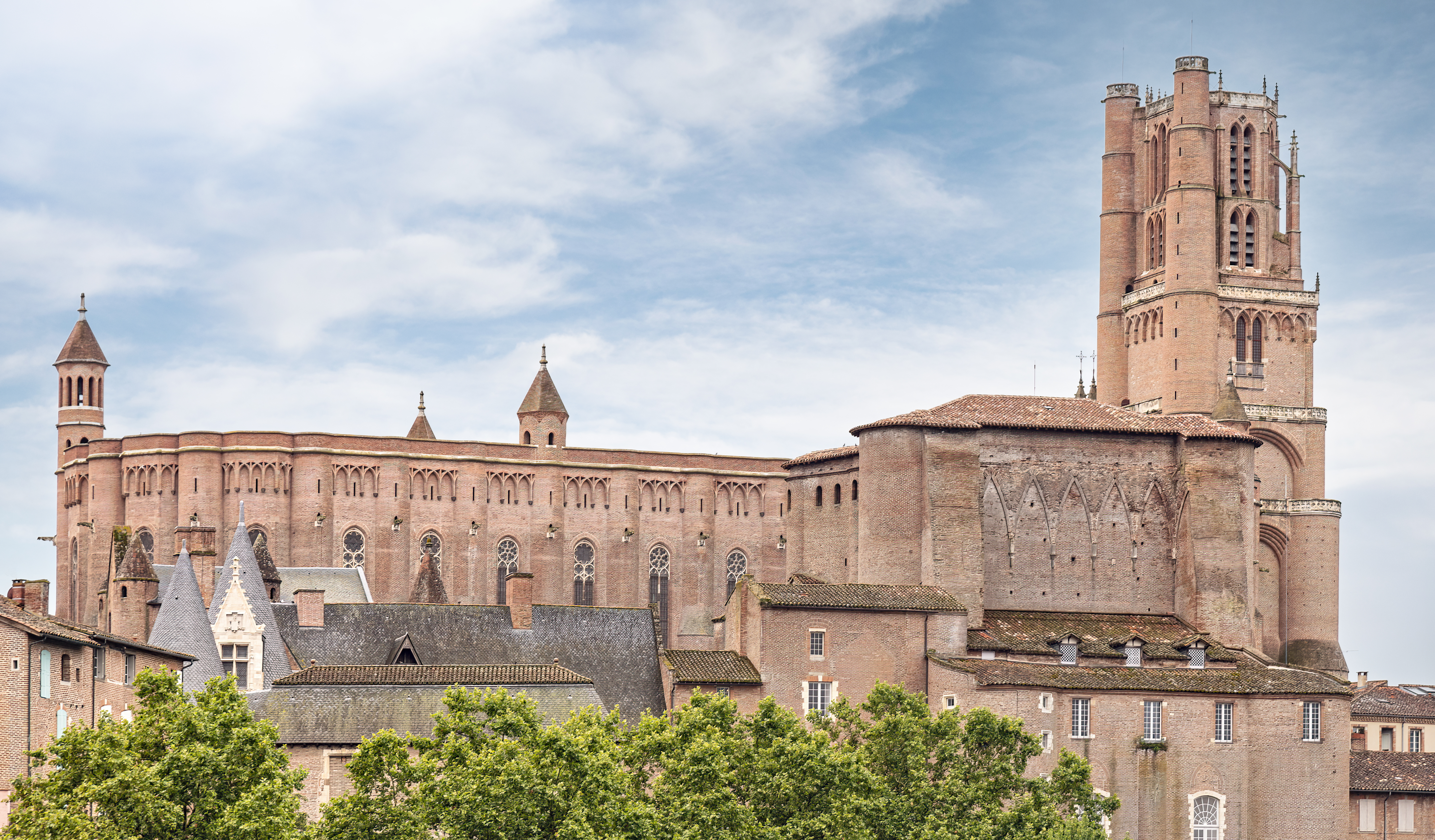
Michel Mouïsse was appointed parish priest of Cathedral of Saint Cecilia of Albi in 1988.

He served as curate of the parish of Saint-Jacques de Villegoudou in Castres.

- From 1967 to 1975: Diocesan chaplain of Action Catholique des Enfants (ACE), Jeunesse Indépendante Chrétienne (JIC), Young Christian Workers (YCW) and Guides de France (GDF).
- From 1975 to 1978: Diocesan chaplain of Jeunesse Indépendante Chrétienne Féminine (JICF).

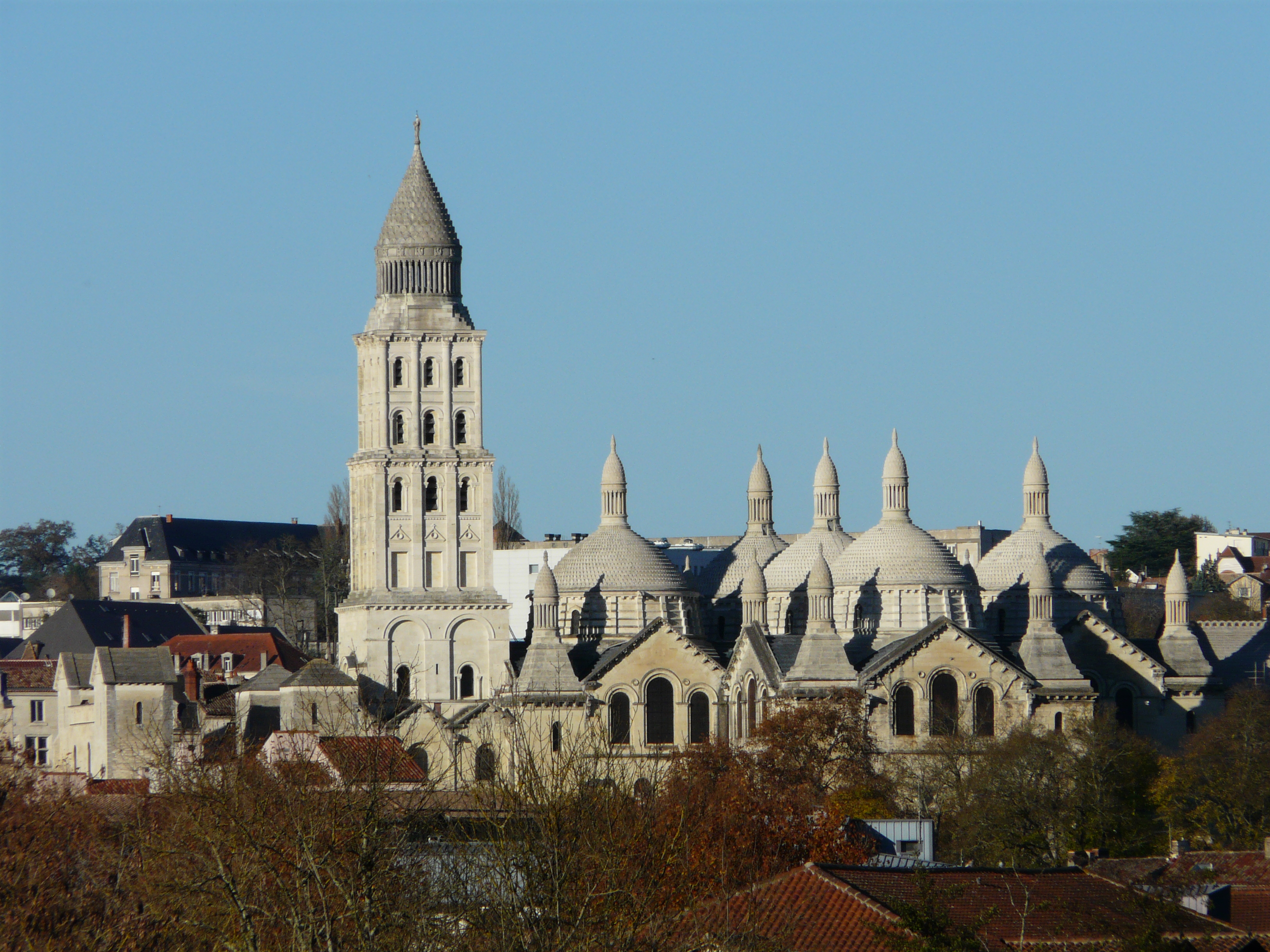
Michel Mouïsse was appointed bishop to the Diocese of Périgueux and Sarlat in 2004.

- From 1978 to 1988: Member of the leadership team of the regional seminary of Toulouse. He was responsible for the spiritual formation, apostolic insertion, and guidance of trainee seminarists.
- From 1984 to 1985: He studied at the Institut de formation des éducateurs du clergé (IFEC) in Paris.
- From 1985 to 1988: In charge of the pastoral care of the family in the Diocese of Albi.
- In 1988: Appointed as archpriest of the Cathedral of Saint Cecilia of Albi and episcopal vicar.
- In 1996: He became Vicar General of the Diocese of Albi, in charge of the lay apostolate.
- In 1998: In collaboration with the historian Philippe Nélidoff, published À Dieu, Père Gaben, in memory of Father Lucien Gaben, who died on April 1 of that year and who had served the diocese of Albi.
- In 1999: After the death of Roger Meindre, he was elected as Apostolic Administrator of the Diocese of Albi.
- In 2000: Consecrated on May 7 by Louis Dufaux, assisted by Émile Marcus and Georges Pontier. Over 2,000 people attended his episcopal consecration in Cathedral of Saint Cecilia of Albi.
- In 2004: Succeeding Gaston Poulain, he was appointed as bishop of the Diocese of Périgueux and Sarlat. His motto was Servir, ne pas être servi (To serve, not to be served).

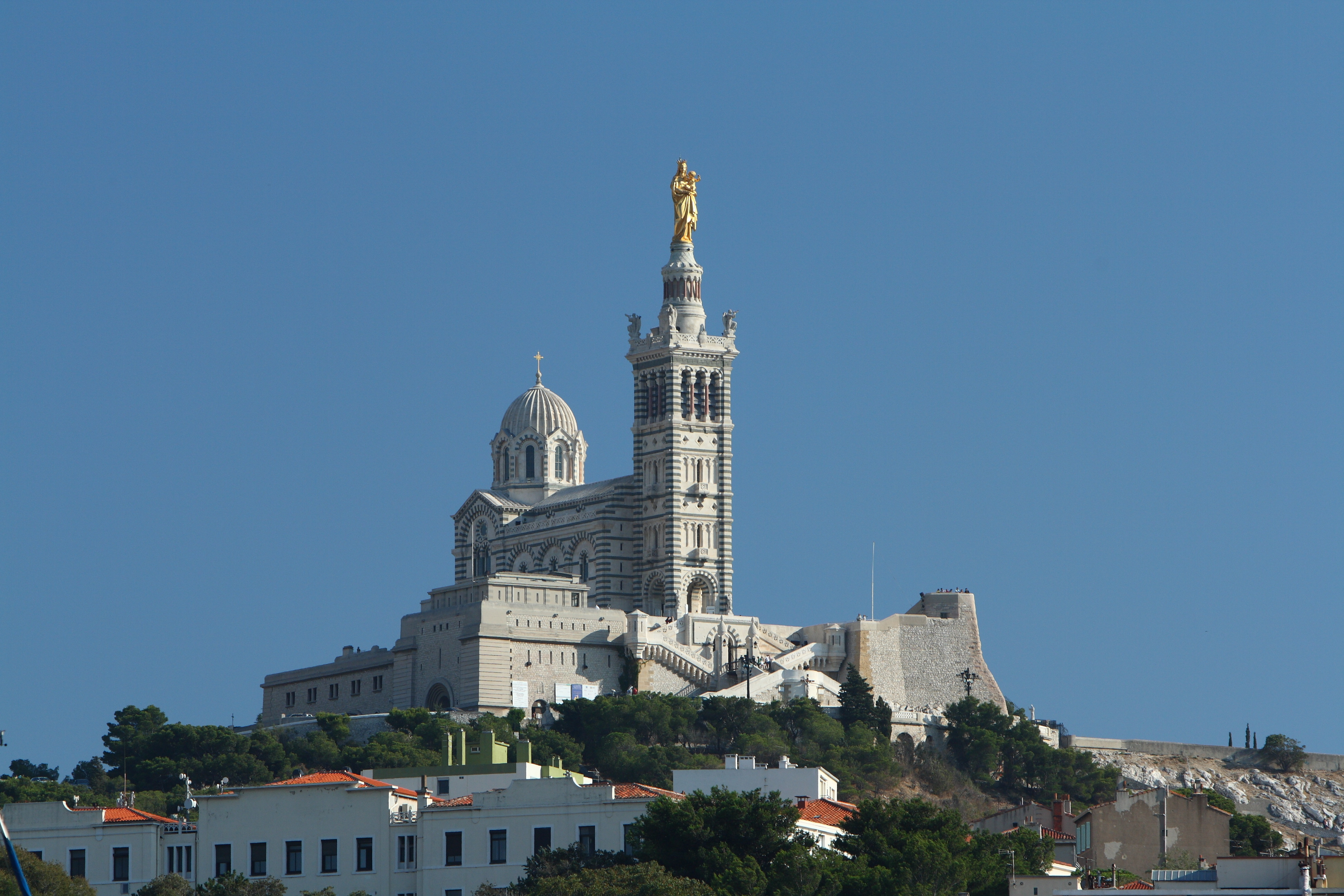
In 2014, Michel Mouïsse joined the team of priests of the Notre-Dame-de-la-Garde in Marseille.

- In 2012:
  - On April 12, in an interview with KTO, he shared his conviction to increase the visibility of the Church in Périgord, the unexpected success of the "invisible monastery" (vocations at home), and the opening of Saint-Jacques, a restaurant in the diocesan house.
  - On September 27: He met Pope Benedict XVI and made visite ad limina.
- In 2014:
  - On January 24, during the bishop's annual greetings, he announced his resignation to "serve the Church differently in Marseille", and to join the team of priests at the Notre-Dame-de-la-Garde.
  - His resignation was accepted on June 18, and he remained Apostolic Administrator until the installation of his successor, Philippe Mousset, on September 14.

=== Rugby union ===
Michel Mouïsse (alongside his father) has supported the local rugby team of Mazamet since his early childhood. He played as an amateur at school, at university, in the army, and at the seminary. Then, he became captain and coach of the Castres Olympique reserve team.

After his ordination, he continued playing the sport for another eight years and left the club at the age of thirty-five.

He regularly reads Midi Olympique and one of his favorite rugby writers is Denis Tillinac.

After moving to the Episcopal see of Périgueux, he supported the Club Athlétique Périgueux Dordogne.

== Position and opinions ==
=== His vision of society ===
In 2010, amid the global economic crisis, Michel Mouïsse called for a "burst of humanity and fraternity" and greater social justice.

=== The situation of Christians in the East ===
In January 2011, with the Middle East amid the Arab Spring, Michel Mouïsse called for peace and dialogue in this part of the world.

In the face of the silence of the French media, on September 10, 2013, Michel Mouïsse addressed the Diocese of Périgueux and Sarlat and the local press under the title "Un silence assourdissant" ("A deafening silence") to raise public awareness of the violence against Christians in the East and the multiple destructions of their places of worship on August 14.

This caused a stir, after being circulated on social networks, along with a photograph of the bishop, and used "for partisan purposes".

In the 2014 municipal elections, according to Christian Foucher (the bishopric's communications director), the modified statement was written by the National Front, with passages "against the socialists" and others inciting to "total war" against "jihadist fanatics,"

On February 4, 2015, a press release (claiming to be written by the bishop) was posted on several extremist websites, denouncing the complicity of the media and the "famous intellectual and political elites" in the attacks on Christian places of worship in Egypt. However, Michel Mouïsse denies this claim, calling it a "hoax".

== Awards ==
- Knight of the Legion of Honour (Chevalier de la Légion d'honneur): On July 13, 2011, for his "48 years of service".
- Medal of the city: On August 25, 2014, by Élisabeth Marty, the Mayor of Saint-Astier, for his many years of service to the diocese.

== See also ==
- Roman Catholic Diocese of Périgueux
- Roman Catholic Archdiocese of Marseille
