= Meyrick Park =

Suburb and area of Bournemouth, Dorset

Coordinates: 50.7288°N 1.8838°W

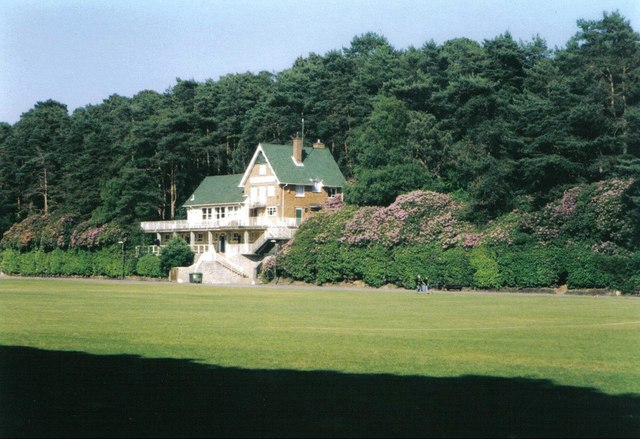
Oakmeadians R.F.C. clubhouse

Meyrick Park (/ˈmɛrɪk/) is a suburb and area of Bournemouth, Dorset. The park itself features a main field with rugby pitches, surrounded by elevated woodland on both sides and a golf course around the western side. Dog-walking is permitted on both, and the paved path along the main field is often used to get to the town centre.

== History ==
Meyrick Park was opened in 1894 on previous common land.

In the early 20th century the area was served by Meyrick Park Halt railway station. Cars used to be allowed access along the path by the main field, but this is now restricted.

In 2014, decomposed partial human remains were found in the golf course by a dog who dragged them out the bushes. Police cordoned off the area and discovered a body 40ft up a tree, later revealed to be Jurij Sliachtecov who had gone missing three years earlier.

== Amenities ==
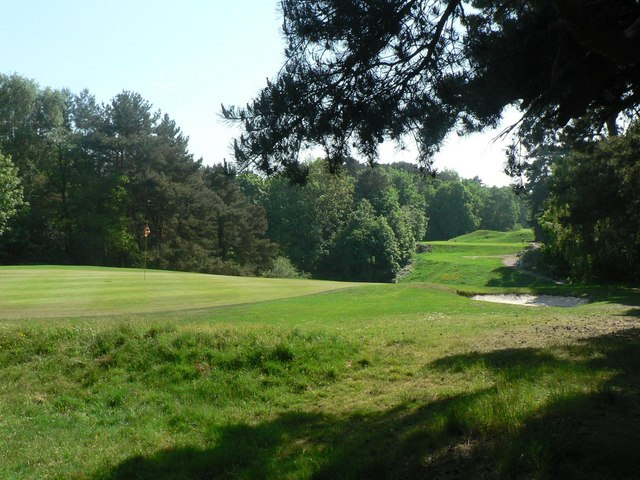
Meyrick Park Golf Course

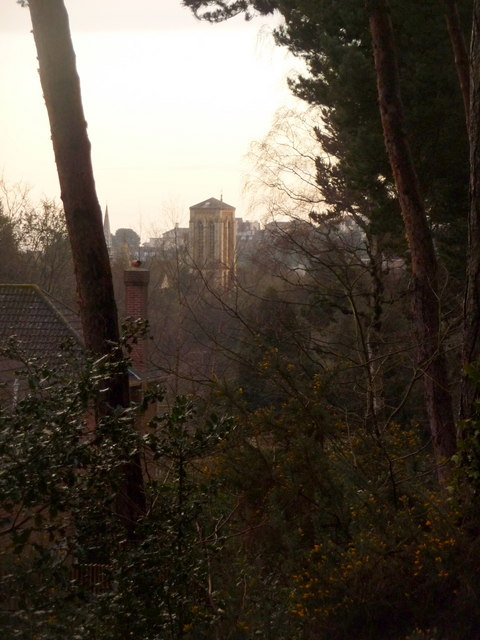
Looking from the eastern side of Meyrick Park, the tower of St Stephen's Church can be seen.

Meyrick Park has two rugby pitches and a clubhouse overlooking them used by Oakmeadians R.F.C. At the end of the main field there is a bowling green and café, and the golf course is served by a country club. The area is just north of St Stephen's Church.

== Politics ==
Meyrick Park is part of the Talbot and Branksome Woods ward for elections to Bournemouth, Christchurch and Poole Council which elects two councillors.

Meyrick Park is part of the Bournemouth East parliamentary constituency.

== Notable people ==
- Richard Palmer-James, musician born in Meyrick Park
