= Lambaesis =

Roman archaeological site in Algeria

- Lambaesa (Lambese)
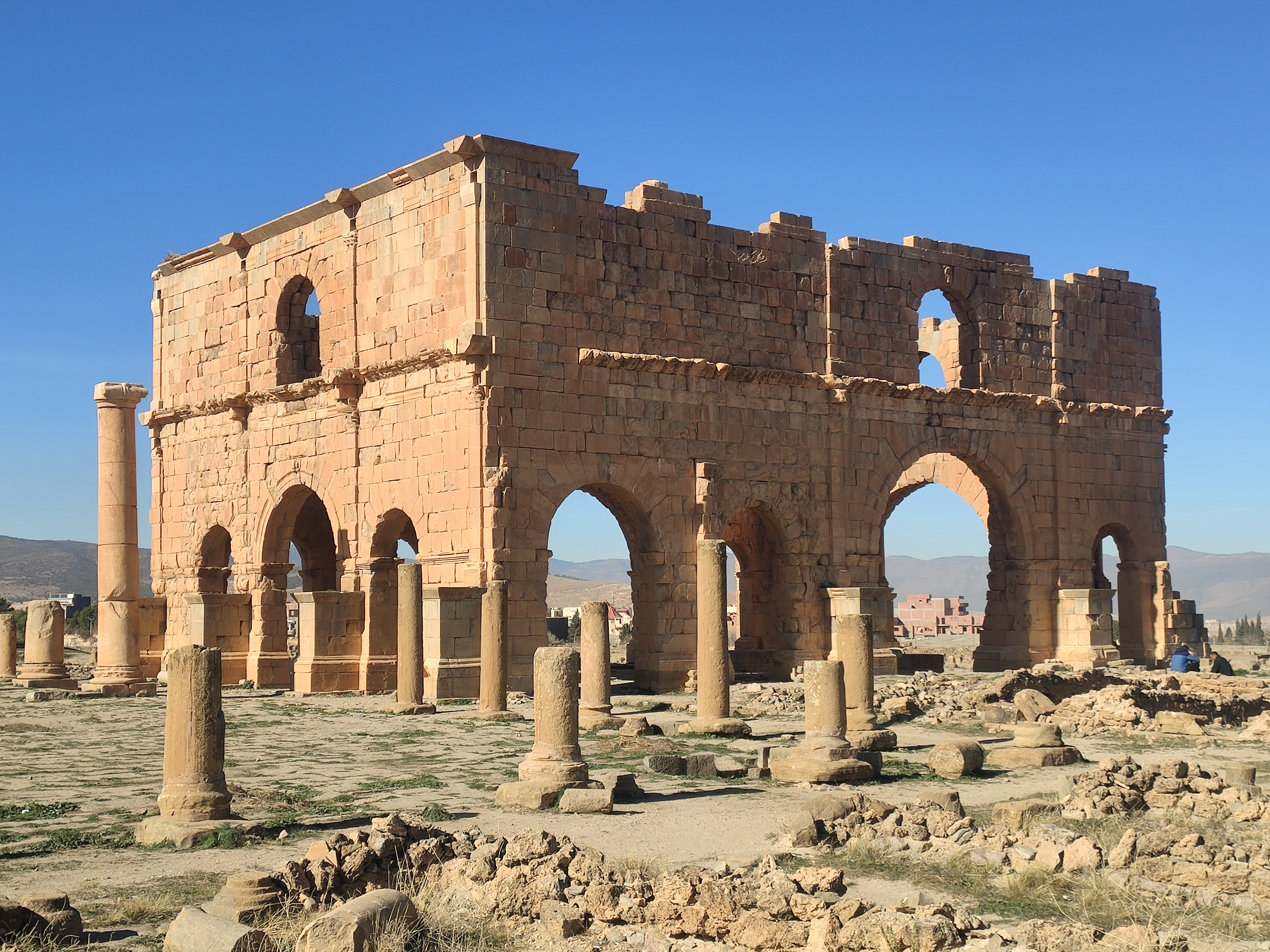

- Location within Algeria
- 35°29′20″N 06°15′21″E
- Type: Settlement
- Periods: Roman Empire
- Location: Tazoult, Batna Province, Algeria

Site notes
- Condition: In ruins

Lambaesis (Lambæsis), Lambaisis or Lambaesa (Lambèse in colonial French), is a Roman archaeological site in Algeria, 11 km (7 mi) southeast of Batna and 27 km (17 mi) west of Timgad, located next to the modern village of Tazoult. The former bishopric is also a Latin Catholic titular bishopric.

== History ==
Lambaesa was founded by the Roman military. The camp of the third legion (Legio III Augusta), to which it owes its origin, appears to have been established between AD 123–129, in the time of Roman emperor Hadrian, whose address to his soldiers was found inscribed on a pillar in a second camp to the west of the great camp still extant. However, other evidence suggests it was formed during the Punic Wars.

The town is built 622 m above sea level in the plain and on the spurs of the Djebel Asker

By AD 166 mention is made of the decurions of a vicus, 10 curiae of which are known by name; and the vicus became a municipium probably at the time when it was made the capital of the newly founded province of Numidia. Lambaesis was populated mainly by Romanized Berbers and by some Roman colonists with their descendants: Latin was the official and commonly used language (even if local Berbers spoke their own language mixed with Latinisms).

III Augusta was disbanded by Gordian III and the legionaries dispersed among the North African provinces. But the legion was restored in the AD 250s by Valerianus and Gallienus and from then on the legion was known as Augusta Restituta. Its final departure did not take place until after AD 392 (the town soon afterwards declined).

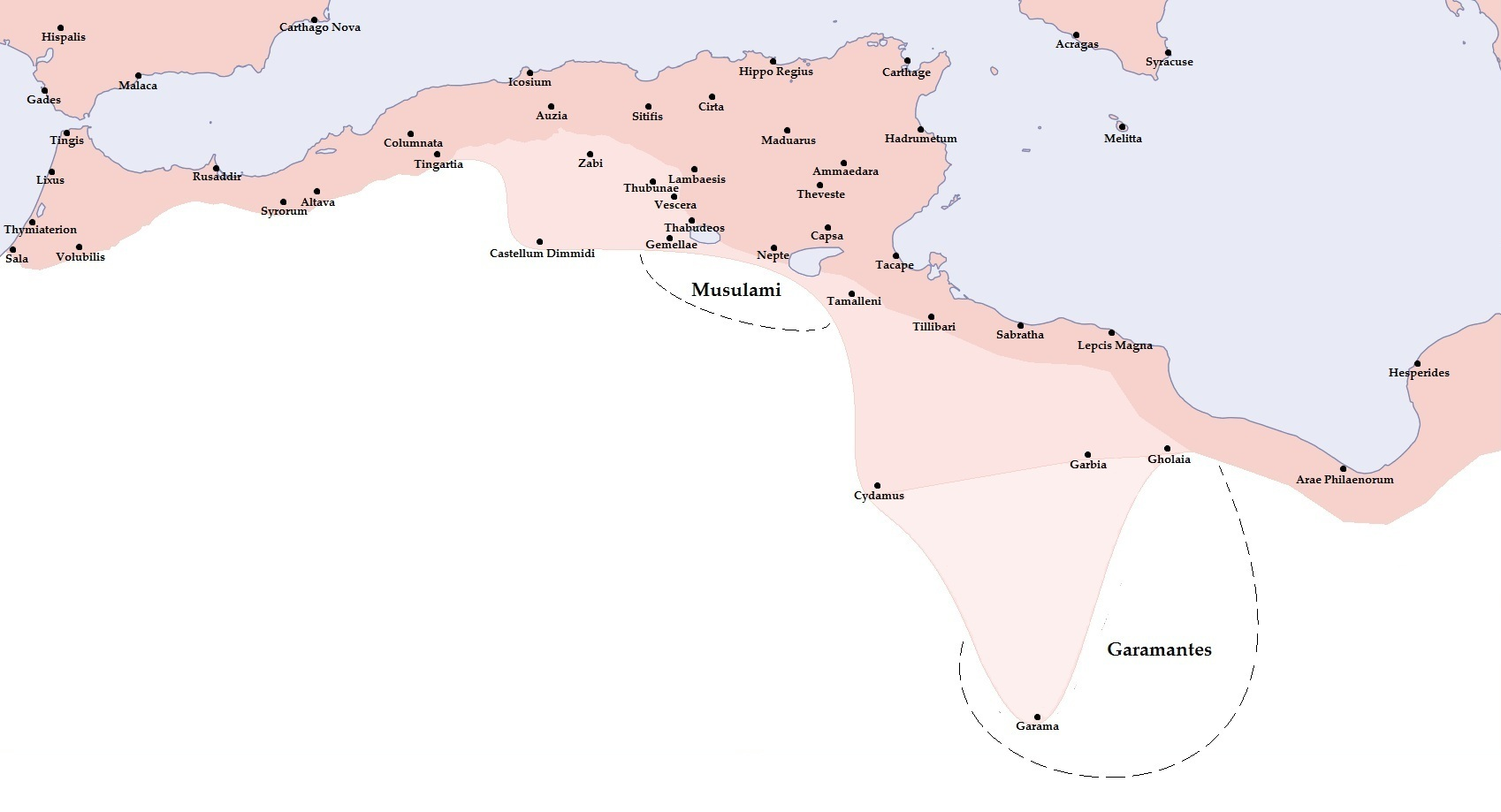
Roman Lambaesis was located at the centre of Berber Africa (in an AD 200 map)

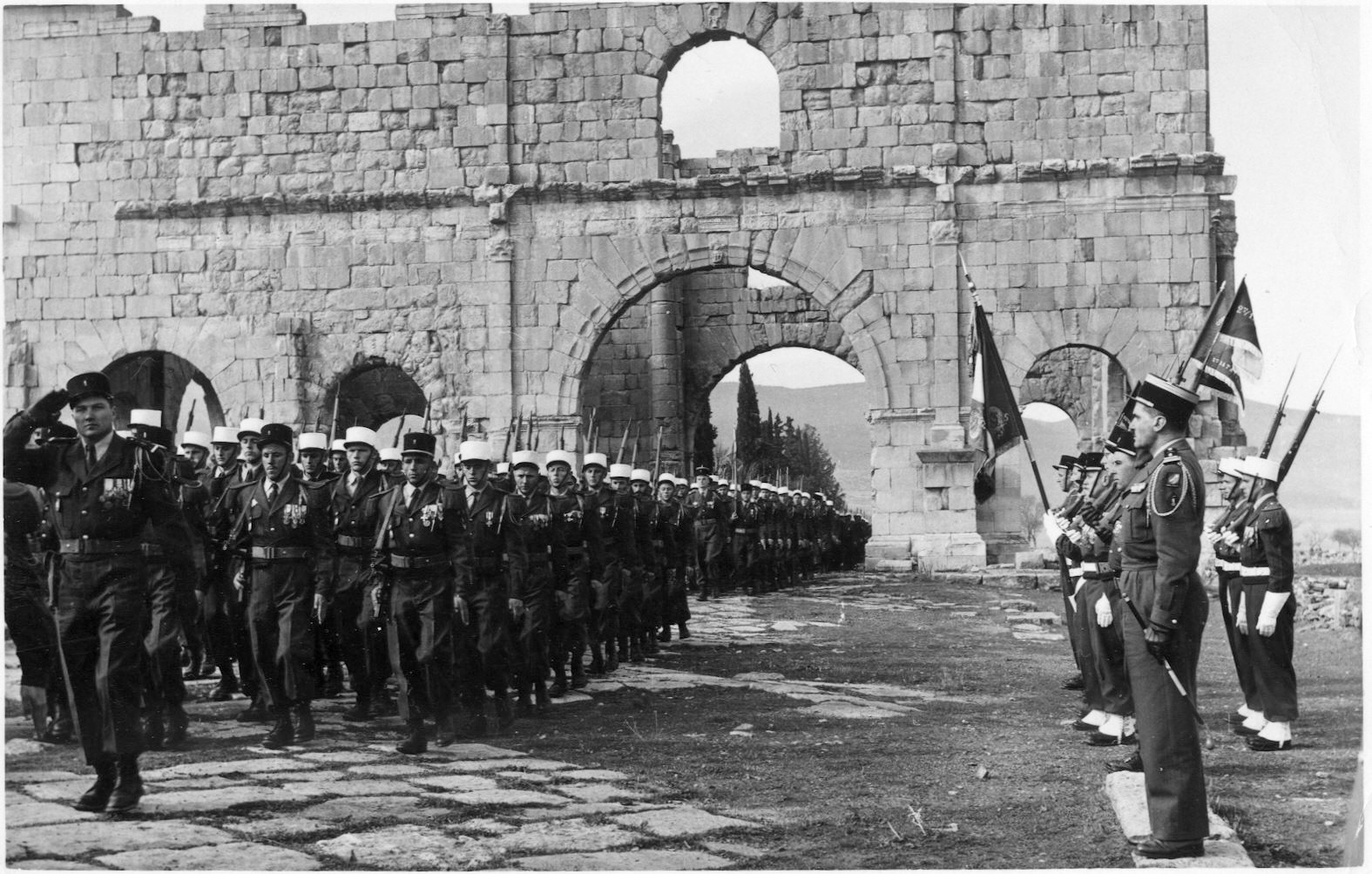
Members of the French Foreign Legion marching through the barracks in 1958

Indeed, under Septimius Severus (AD 193 ), Numidia was separated from Africa Vetus, and governed by an imperial procurator. Under the new organization of the empire by Diocletian, Numidia was divided in two provinces: the north became Numidia Cirtensis, with capital at Cirta, while the south, which included the Aurès Mountains and was threatened by raids, became Numidia Militiana, "Military Numidia", with capital at the legionary base of Lambaesis.

Subsequently, however, Emperor Constantine the Great reunited the two provinces in a single one, administered from Cirta, which was now renamed Constantina (modern Constantine, Algeria) in his honour. Its governor was raised to the rank of consularis in AD 320, and the province remained one of the seven provinces of the diocese of Africa until the invasion of the Vandals in AD 428, which began its slow decay, accompanied by desertification. The province remained under Vandal rule, but was effectively limited to the coastal areas by Berber raids. It was restored to Roman rule after the Vandalic War, when it became part of the new praetorian prefecture of Africa.

The Byzantines occupied Lambaesis and vicinity from the sixth century but around AD 683 the Arabs conquered the area, naming what remained of the city Bar-el-Molouk in the 10th century.

== Ecclesiastical history ==
Lambaesis was an episcopal see during late Ancient times as part of the Roman province of Numidia. For such an important town, its bishopric is surprisingly absent from the historical record. Lambaesis did not send a representative to the Council of Nicaea nor Chalcedon and is not mentioned by LeQuinn .

Saint Cyprian mentions a heretic bishop of Lambaesis who was condemned by a local synod of bishops around the year 240.

=== Titular see ===
The extinct diocese was nominally restored as a titular bishopric. Initially revived as Lambaisis, it was renamed Lambaesis in 1925.

It has had the following incumbents, of the lowest (episcopal) rank :

- Jan Dembowski (1759.09.24 – 1790)
- Hieronim Stojnowski (Stroynowski) (1804.08.20 – 1814.09.26)
- Mateo José González Rubio (1836.02.01 – 1845.06.15)
- Eduardo Vásquez, Dominican Order (O.P.) (1853.12.30 – 1856.12.12)
- Thomas O’Callaghan, O.P. (1884.06.29 – 1886.12.03)
- Jean-Marie-Michel Blois (衛忠藩), Paris Foreign Missions Society (M.E.P.) (1921.12.29 – 1946.04.11), as Apostolic Vicar of Southern Manchuria 南滿 (China) (1921.12.19 – 1924.12.03) and as Apostolic Vicar of Shenyang 瀋陽 (China) (1924.12.03 – 1946.04.11), later promoted first Metropolitan Archbishop of Shenyang 瀋陽 (China) (1946.04.11 – 1946.05.18)
- James Moynagh, S.P.S. (1947.06.12 – 1950.04.18)
- Vincenzo Maria Jacono (1950.09.08 – 1955.02.02)
- Thomas Edward Gill (1956.04.11 – 1973.11.11)
- John Stephen Cummins (1974.02.26 – 1977.05.03)
- John Joseph Paul (1977.05.17 – 1983.10.14)
- Cardinal Marian Jaworski (1984.05.21 – 1991.01.16), while Apostolic Administrator of Lviv (Ukraine) (1984.05.21 – 1991.01.16), later Metropolitan Archbishop of the same Lviv (Ukraine) (1991.01.16 – 2008.10.21), President of Episcopal Conference of Ukraine (1994 – 2008.10.21), Apostolic Administrator of Lutsk (Ukraine) (1996 – 1998.03.25), Cardinal-Priest of S. Sisto (2001.02.21 [2001.05.20] – ...)
- Michel Pierre Marie Mouïsse (2000.03.10 – 2004.03.05)
- Carlo Roberto Maria Redaelli (2004.04.08 – 2012.06.28), (later Archbishop)
- David Prescott Talley (2013.01.03 – 2016.09.21), Auxiliary Bishop of Atlanta (USA)
- Marc Pelchat (2016.10.25 – ...), Auxiliary Bishop of Québec (Canada)

== Remains ==
The remains of the Roman town, and more especially of the Roman camp, in spite of wanton vandalism, are among the most interesting ruins in northern Africa.

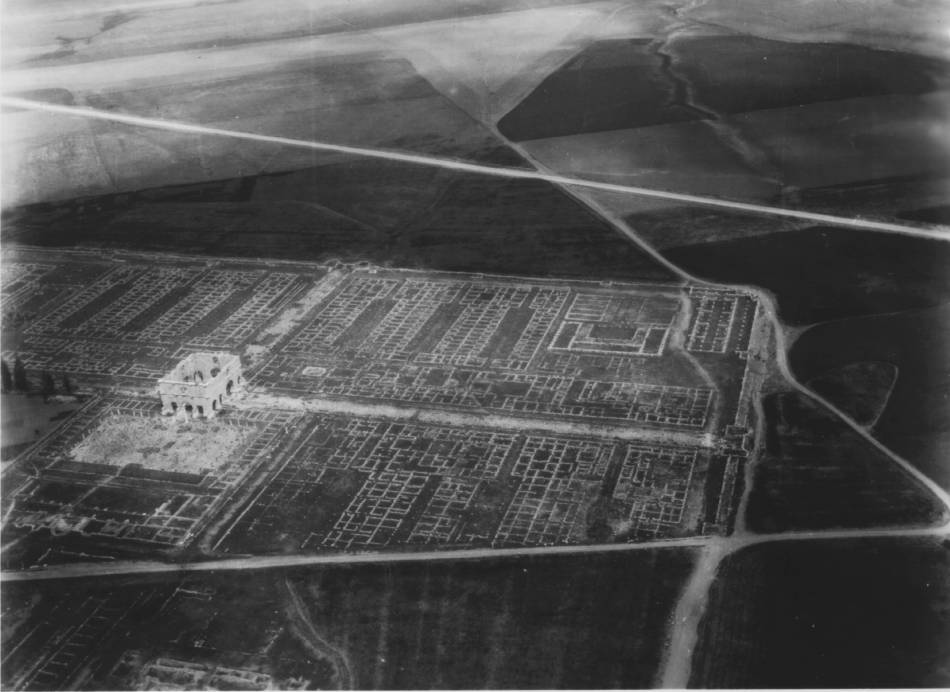
Aerial view of Lambaesis ruins

The ruins are situated on the lower terraces of the Aures Mountains, and consist of triumphal arches (one to Septimius Severus, another to Commodus), temples, aqueducts, vestiges of an amphitheatre, baths and an immense quantity of masonry belonging to private houses. To the north and east lie extensive cemeteries with the stones standing in their original alignments; to the west is a similar area, from which, however, the stones have been largely removed for building the modern village.

Of the temple of Aesculapius, only one column is standing, though in the middle of the 19th century its façade was entire. The capitol or temple dedicated to Jupiter, Juno and Minerva, which has been cleared of debris, has a portico with eight columns. On level ground about two-thirds of a mile from the centre of the ancient town stands the camp, its site now partly occupied by the penitentiary and its gardens. It measures 1,640 feet (500 m) by 1,476 feet (450 m), and in the middle rise the ruins of a building commonly called, but incorrectly, the praetorium. This noble building, which dates from 268, is 92 feet (28 m) long by 66 feet (20 m) broad and 49 feet (15 m) high; its southern façade has a splendid peristyle half the height of the wall, consisting of a front row of massive Ionic columns and an engaged row of Corinthian pilasters.

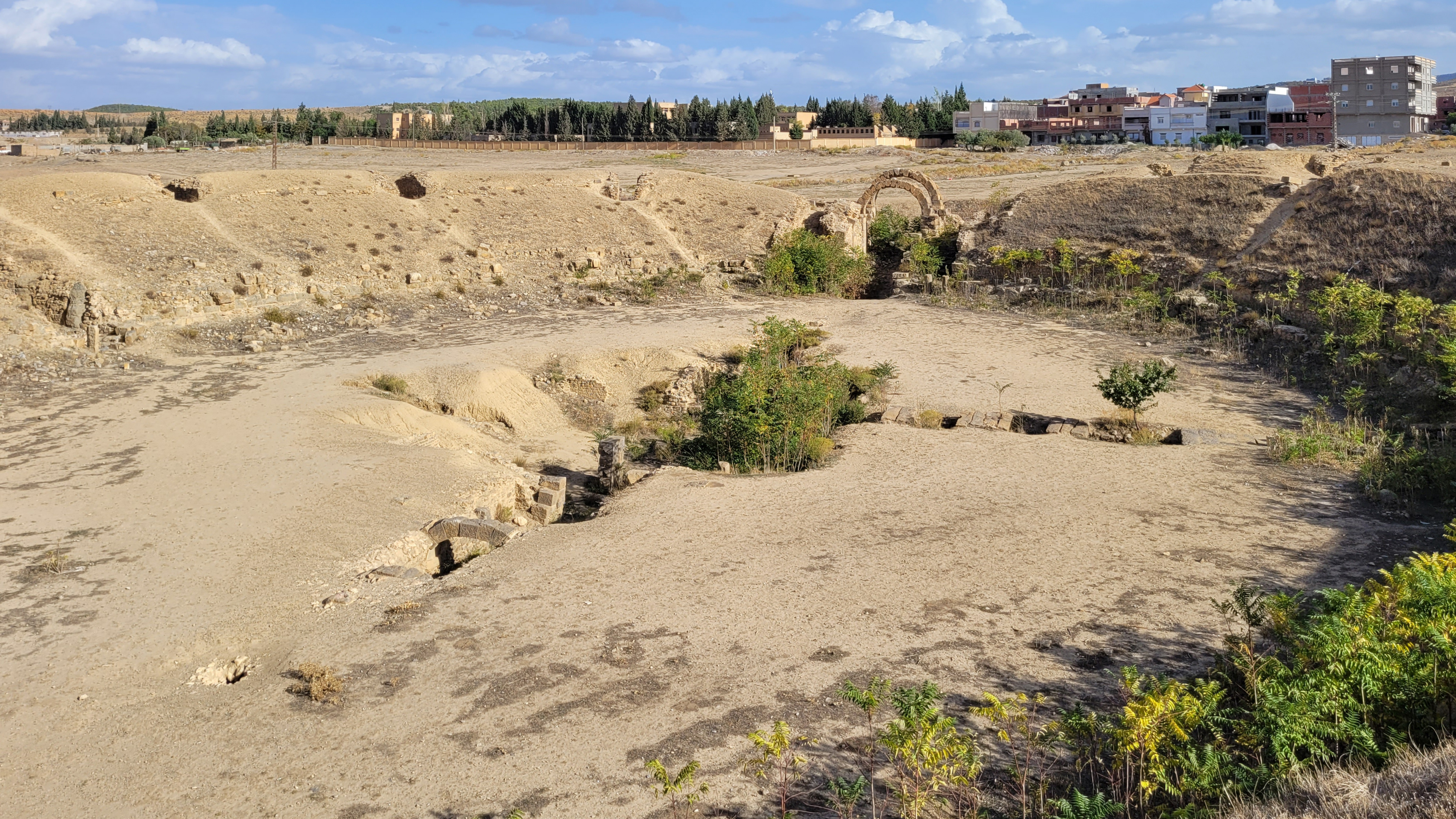
Amphitheatre of Lambaesis

Behind this building (which was roofed), is a large court giving access to other buildings, one being the arsenal. In it have been found many thousands of projectiles. To the southeast are the remains of the baths. The ruins of both city and camp have yielded many inscriptions (Renier edited 1500, and there are 4185 in CIL viii); and, though a very large proportion are epitaphs of the barest kind, the more important pieces supply an outline of the history of the place.

Over 2,500 inscriptions relating to the camp have been deciphered. In a museum in the village are objects of antiquity discovered in the vicinity. In addition to inscriptions and statues, there are some fine mosaics found in 1905 near the arch of Septimius Severus. The statues include those of Aesculapius and Hygieia, taken from the temple of Aesculapius.

About 2 miles (3.2 km) east of Lambessa are the ruins of Markuna, the ancient Verecunda, including two triumphal arches.

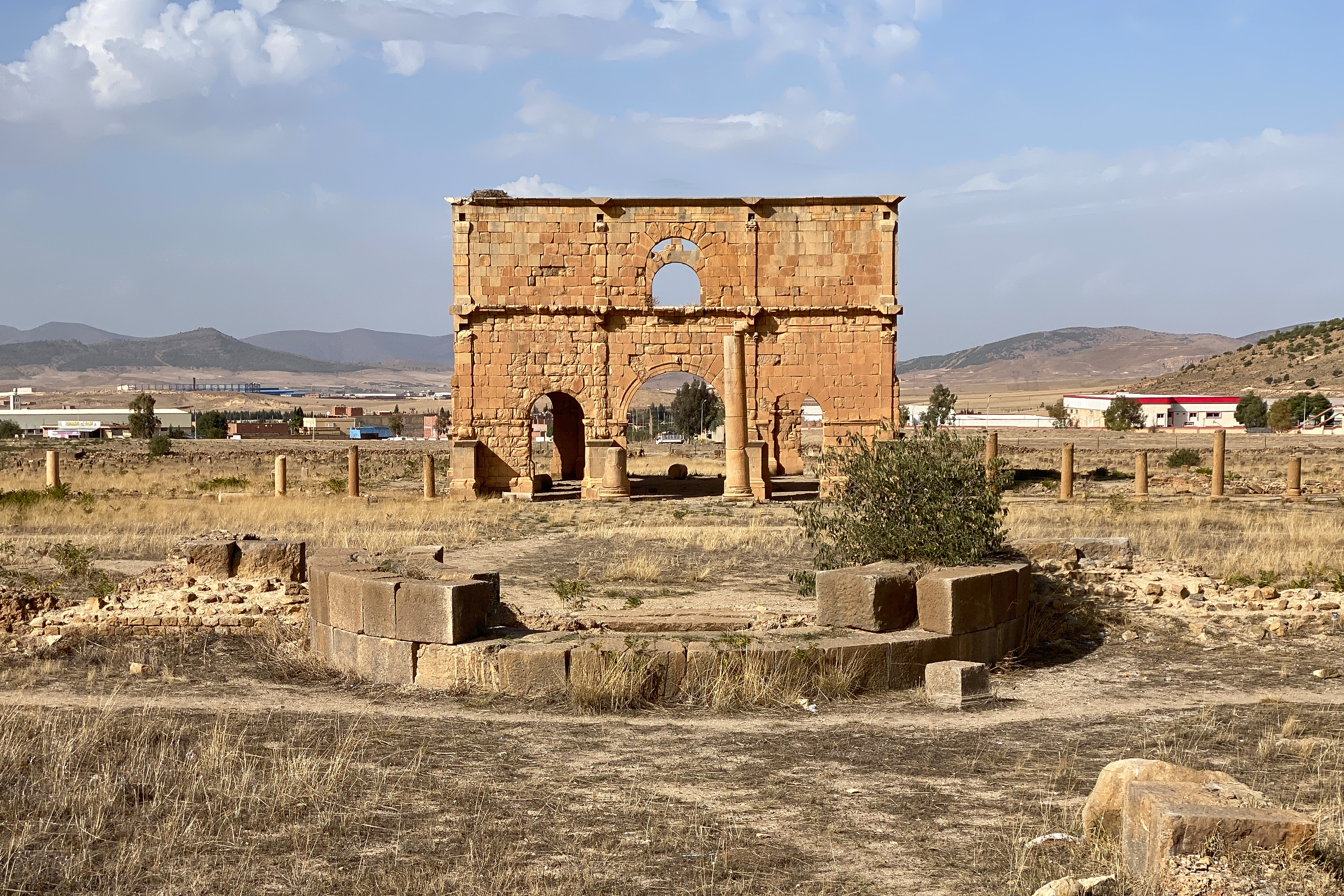
Praetorium

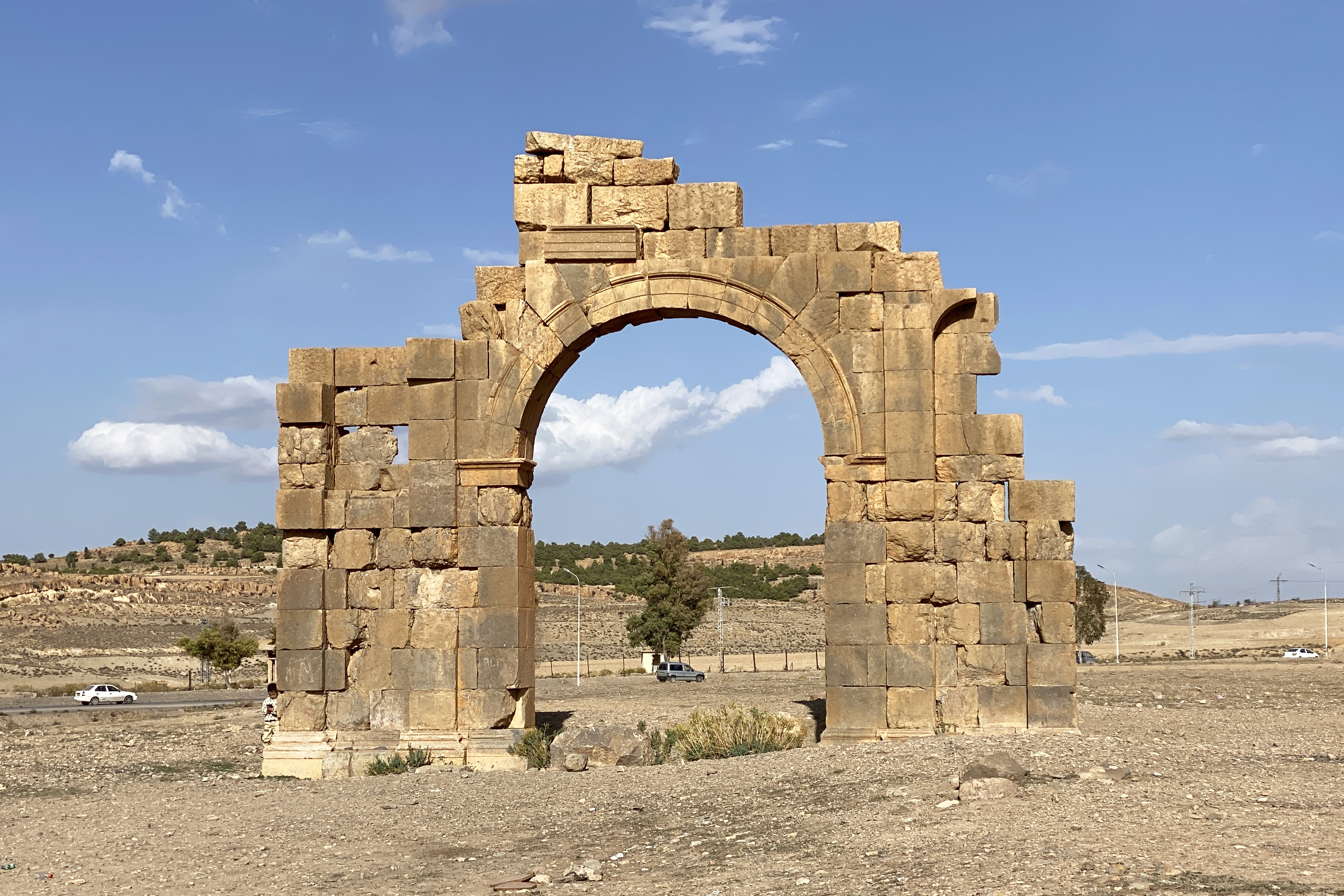
Arch of Commodus

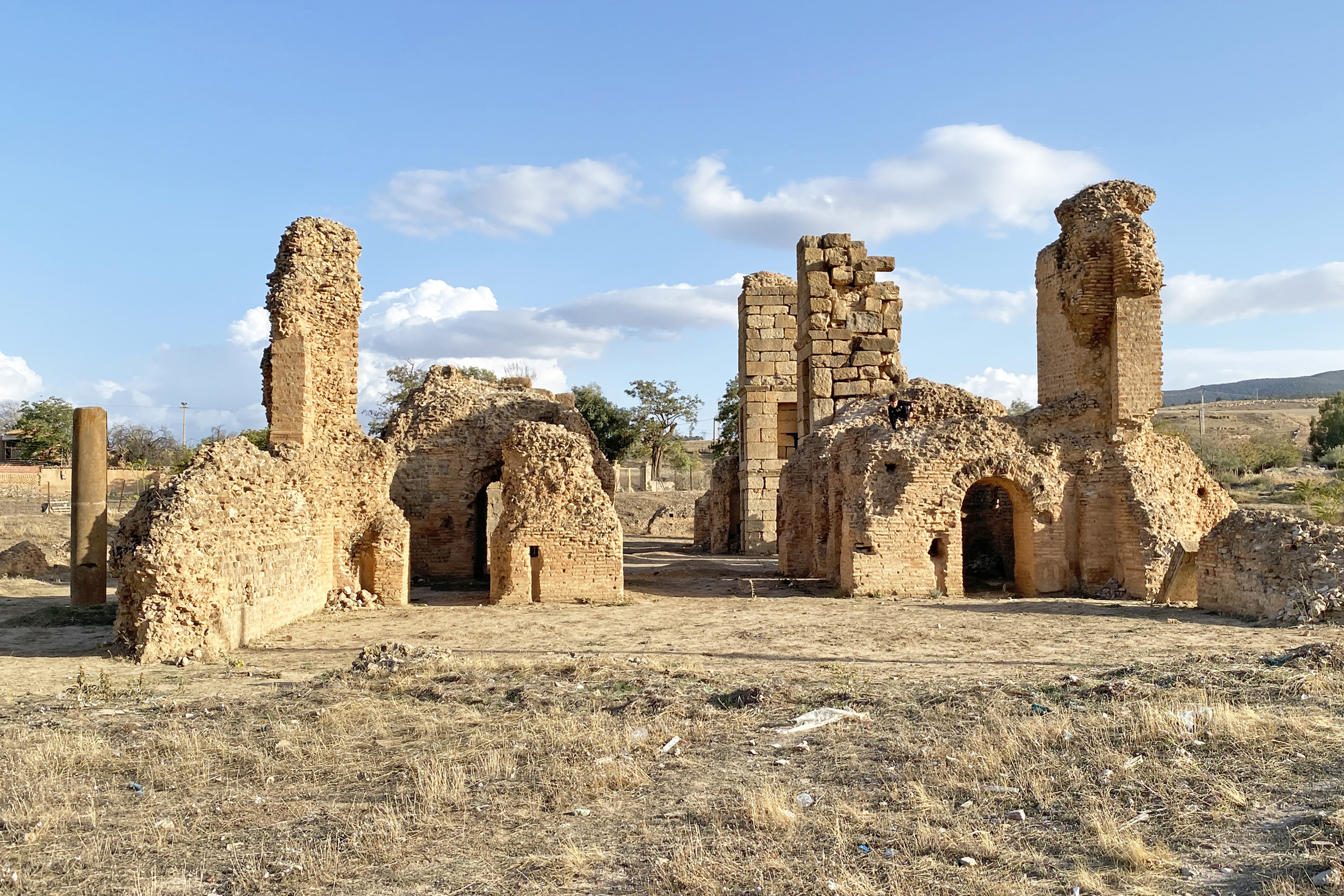
Thermae

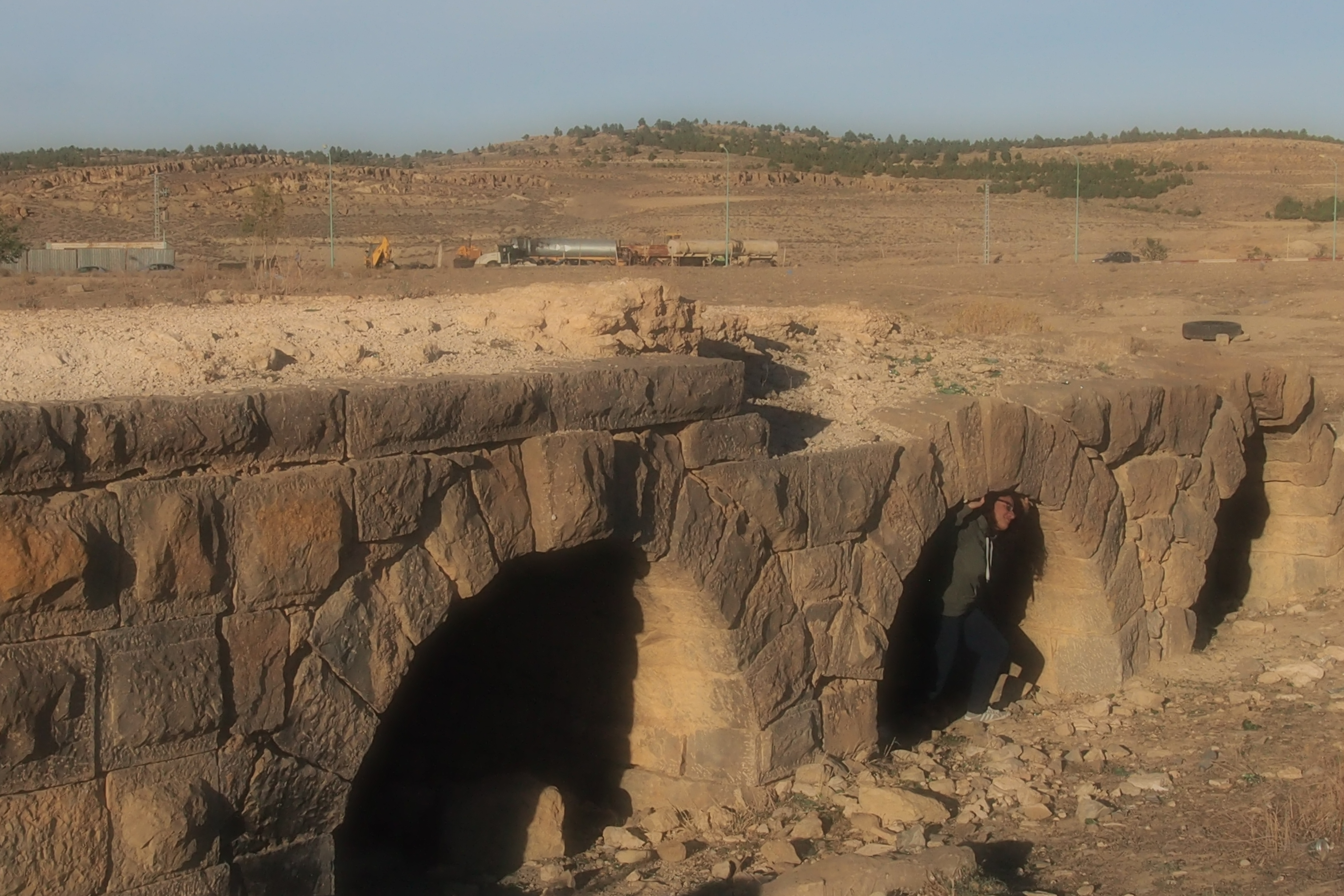
Roman Bridge at Tazoult

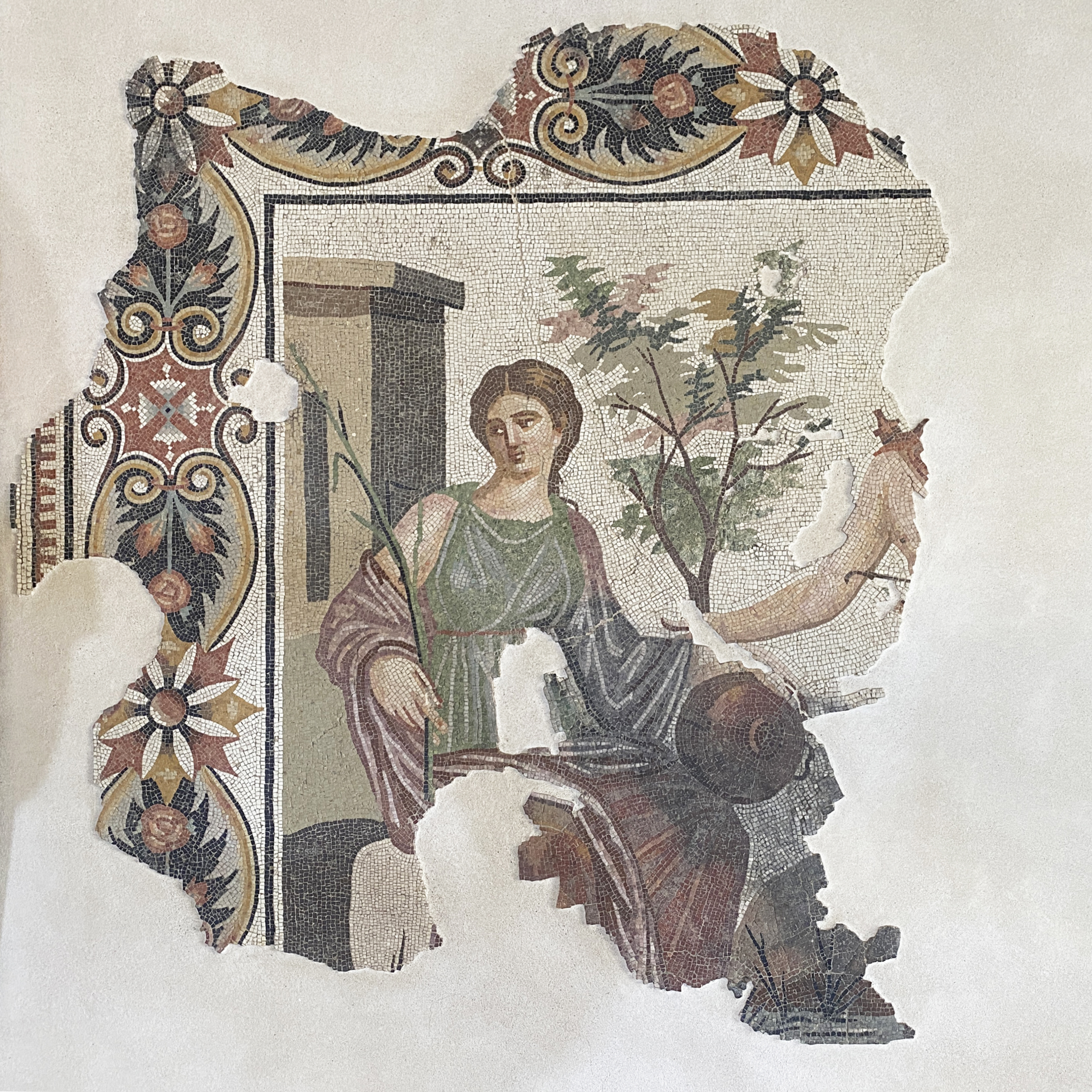
Mosaic at Lambaesis

== See also ==
- Legio III Augusta
- Timgad
- Djémila
- Cirta
- Caesarea
- Auzia
- Rapidum

== Source and External links ==
- Joint Anglo-Algerian excavations of Lambaesis — archaeological team since 1985.
- GigaCatholic with titular incumbent biography links
- Archeorom3.site: Photos from Lambaesis
- Images of Lambaesis (Tazoult) in Manar al-Athar digital heritage photo archive
