= Wings of Silver: The Vi Cowden Story =

Wings of Silver: The Vi Cowden Story DVD doc short

Wings of Silver: The Vi Cowden Story is a 2010 documentary film by Mark and Christine Bonn detailing the story of the Women Airforce Service Pilots of World War II through the eyes of Vi Cowden.

As one of only 114 women to pilot fighter planes from the factories to their debarkation points, Ms. Cowden has a unique view of women's place in the world of 1943 United States. The News Tribune in Washington says, "This documentary tells the unsung story of the W.A.S.P.s (Women Air Force Service Pilots) during World War II. It’s a true story of women triumphing over adversity."

== Awards ==
- Audience Choice Award Best Short Documentary - Sedona International Film Festival 2011
- Audience Choice Award Best Short Documentary - Port Townsend Film Festival 2010
- Audience Award - Gig Harbor Film Festival 2010
- Audience Award Short Film - Newport Beach Film Festival 2010
- Audience Award – Buffalo Niagara Film Festival 2010
- Best Documentary - Riverside International Film Festival 2011
- Best Documentary Short - Black Hills Film Festival 2010
- Best Documentary Short - Rainier Independent Film Festival 2010
- Best Documentary Short - Ventura Film Festival 2010
- Honorable Mention – ReelHeART International Film Festival 2011
- Award of Merit: Short Documentary - The Accolade Competition 2010

=== Official Entry ===
- Festivus Film Festival 2010
- Boulder International Film Festival 2010
- Durango Independent Film Festival 2010
- Tiburon International Film Festival 2010
- Palm Beach International Film Festival 2010 (not in competition)
- Cheyenne International Film Festival 2010 (not in competition)
- Air Venture - Oshkosh, WI 2010 (not in competition)
- New Orleans Film Festival 2010
