= Gaston Poulain =

Gaston Élie Poulain P.S.S.
- Bishop of Périgueux and Sarlat
- Church: Catholic Church
- Diocese: Diocese of Périgueux and Sarlat
- In office: 15 October 1988 – 5 March 2004
- Predecessor: Jacques-Julien-Émile Patria
- Successor: Michel Mouïsse
- Previous posts: Coadjutor Bishop of Périgueux and Sarlat (1985-1988)

Orders
- Ordination: 8 December 1951
- Consecration: 3 November 1985 by Albert Decourtray

Personal details
- Born: 19 July 1927 Truttemer-le-Grand, Calvados, France
- Died: 24 October 2015 (aged 88)

Gaston Élie Poulain (19 July 1927 – 24 October 2015) was a Catholic bishop.

Ordained to the priesthood in 1951, Poulain was appointed coadjutor bishop of the Diocese of Périgueux, France in 1985 and then succeeded to the diocese in 1988 retiring in 2004.
