= St Stephen's Church, Bournemouth =

Church in Dorset, England

St Stephen's Church
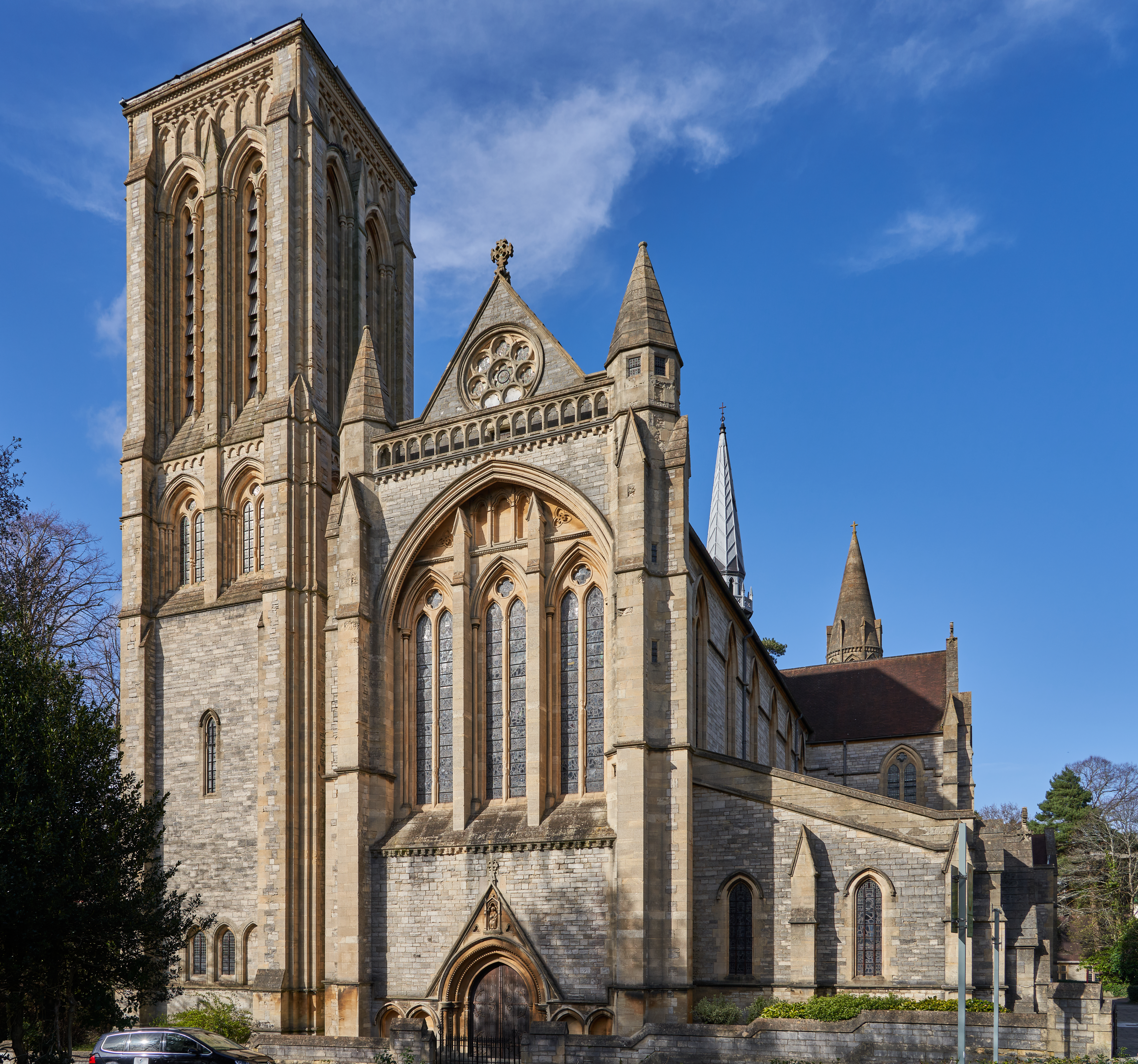
- St Stephen's Church
- 50.7232°N 1.8807°W
- Denomination: Church of England
- Churchmanship: Anglo-Catholic
- Website: Official website

History
- Dedication: Saint Stephen

Administration
- Province: Canterbury
- Diocese: Winchester
- Parish: Bournemouth Town Centre

Clergy
- Vicar: The Reverend Canon Nicholas Jepson-Biddle

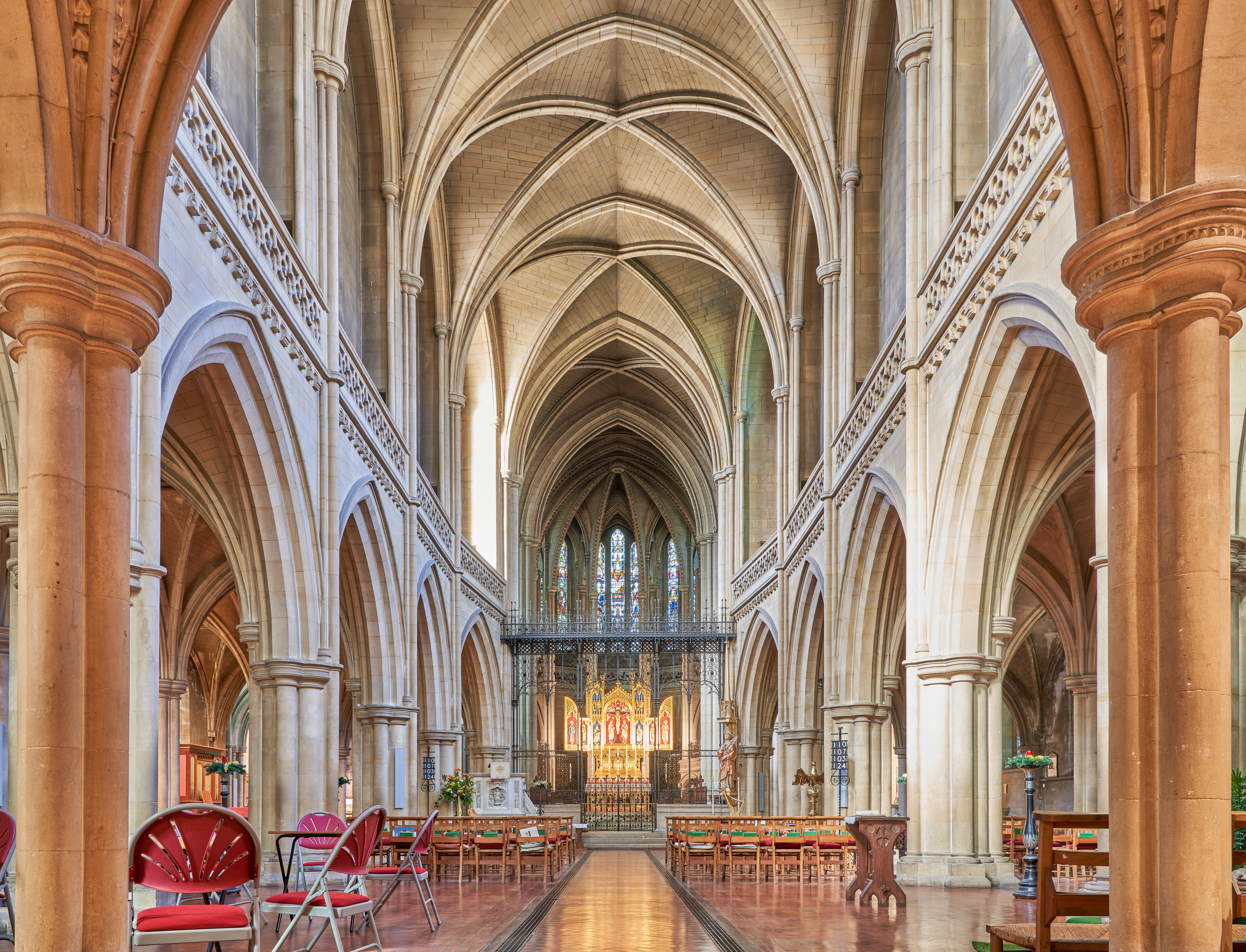
Interior

St Stephen's Church is a Church of England parish church in Bournemouth, Dorset (formerly in Hampshire), England. The liturgical life of the church is rooted in the Anglo-Catholic tradition, and the building features a noted lady chapel.

The church is close to Bournemouth town centre and Meyrick Park.

== History ==
The church was designed by the architect John Loughborough Pearson as a memorial to Alexander Morden Bennett, first vicar of St Peter's Church, Bournemouth. It is constructed with Purbeck stone and Bath stone. Its nave was built from 1881 to 1883 and the chancel from 1896 to 1897. The tower was built from 1907 to 1908. It is a Grade I listed building.

It was in here, on 15 March 1888, that the wedding between Oscar Bernadotte of Sweden, son of King Oscar II, and Ebba Munck af Fulkila, took place.

== Vicars ==
- 1881–1911 Alexander Sykes Bennett
- 1911–28 George Philip Trevelyan
- 1928–44 Philip Harold Rogers
- 1944–52 Geoffrey Heald
- 1952–58 Francis John Michael Dean
- 1958–62 Charles Edward Burnett Neate
- 1962–70 George Percy Wilkins
- 1970–73 Anthony Douglas Caesar
- 1974–83 John David Corbett
- 1983–87 John Catlin
- 1987–94 Paul Hastrop
- 1994–2012 Robin Harger
- 2009–2023 Ian Terry
- 2024– Nicholas Lawrence Jepson-Biddle

== Music ==
The church has an organ by William Hill dating from 1898. A specification of the organ can be found on the National Pipe Organ Register. There is also a small five-stop chamber organ dating from 1870. The specification of the chamber organ can also be found on the National Pipe Organ Register.

=== List of organists ===
- 1881–93 T. J. Baker
- 1894–1930 Henry Holloway
- 1930–35 Percy Whitlock
- 1936–66 Cyril Knight
- 1967–75 Spencer Fackerell
- 1976 Roger Hill
- 1976–82 Cyril Knight
- 1982–88 Ian Harrison
- 1988–94 Anthony Wood
- 1994–2019 Ian Harrison
- 2019–2024 Sean Tucker

 2026-  Nigel Groome

== Gallery ==
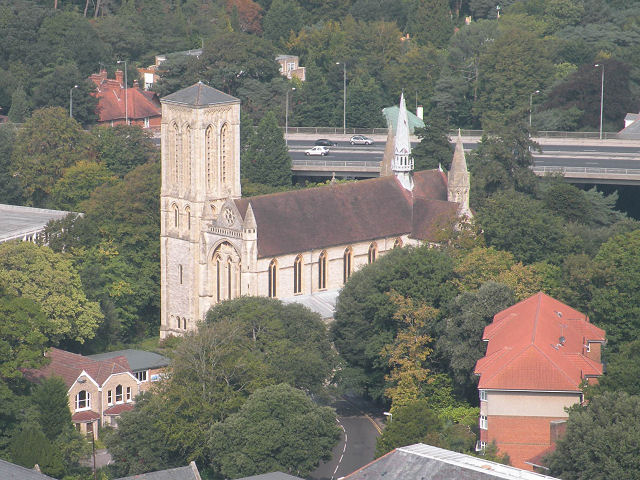
Viewed from the Bournemouth Eye

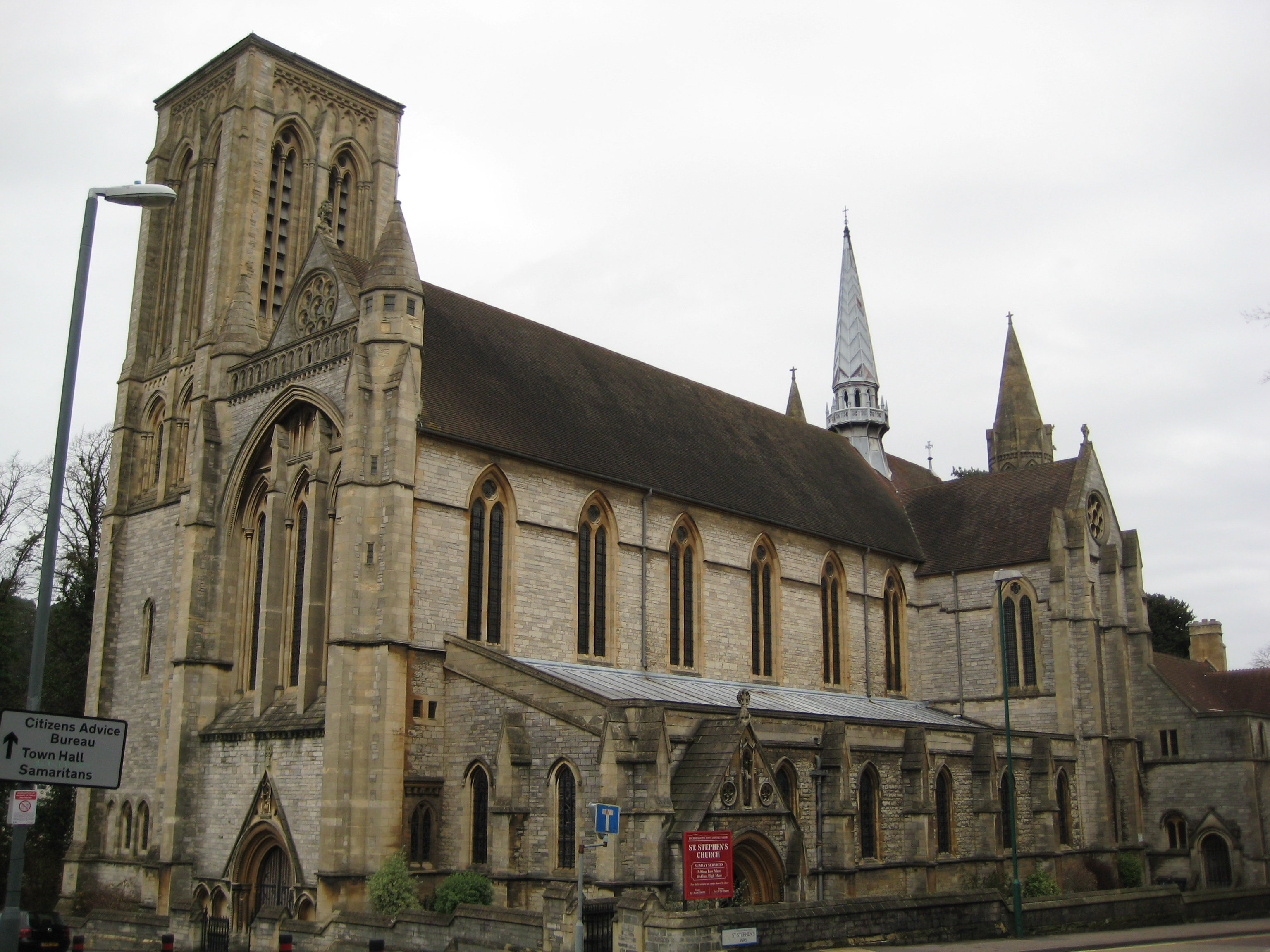
Main entrance

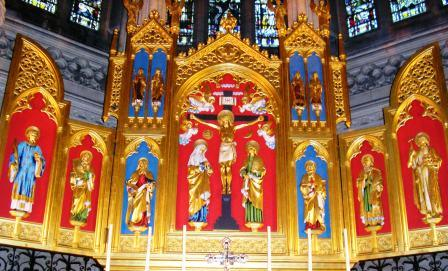
Behind the altar

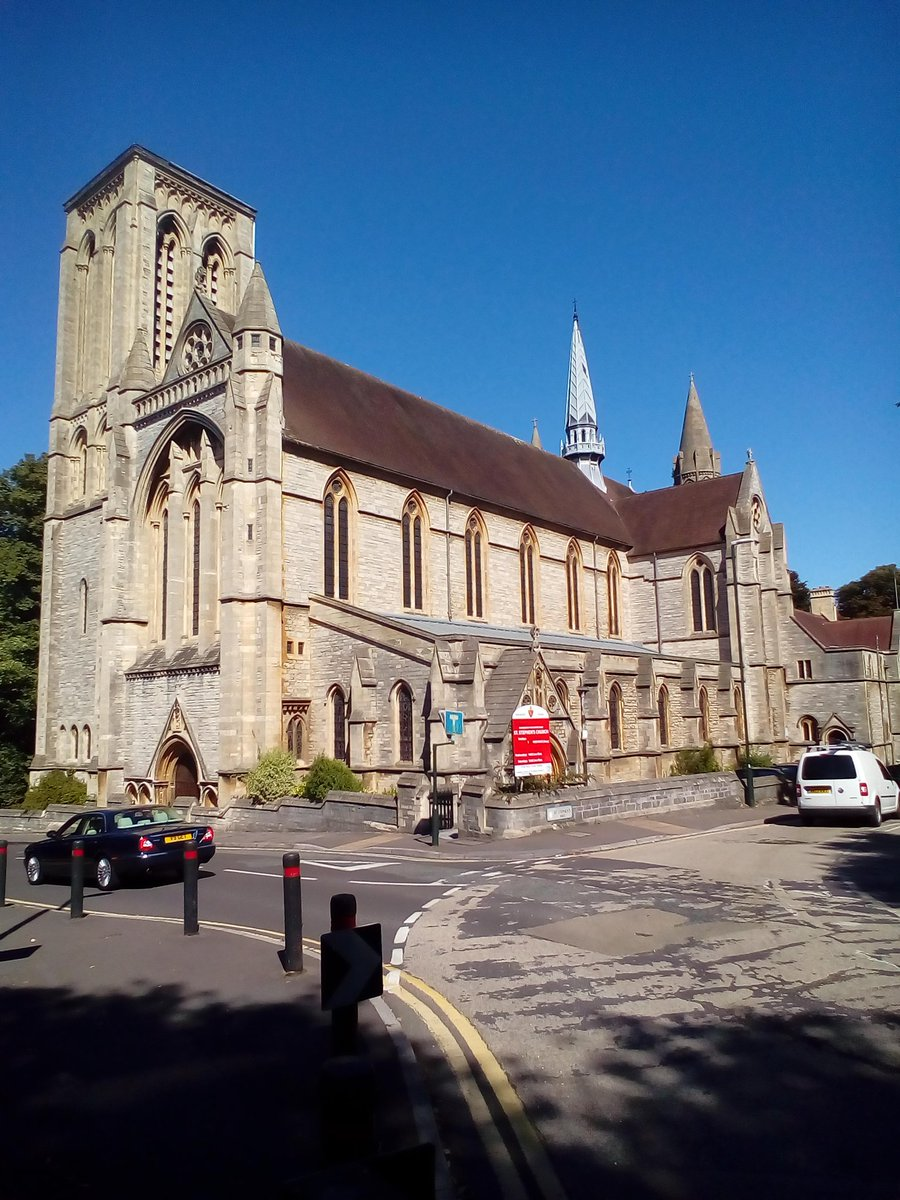
View from the street

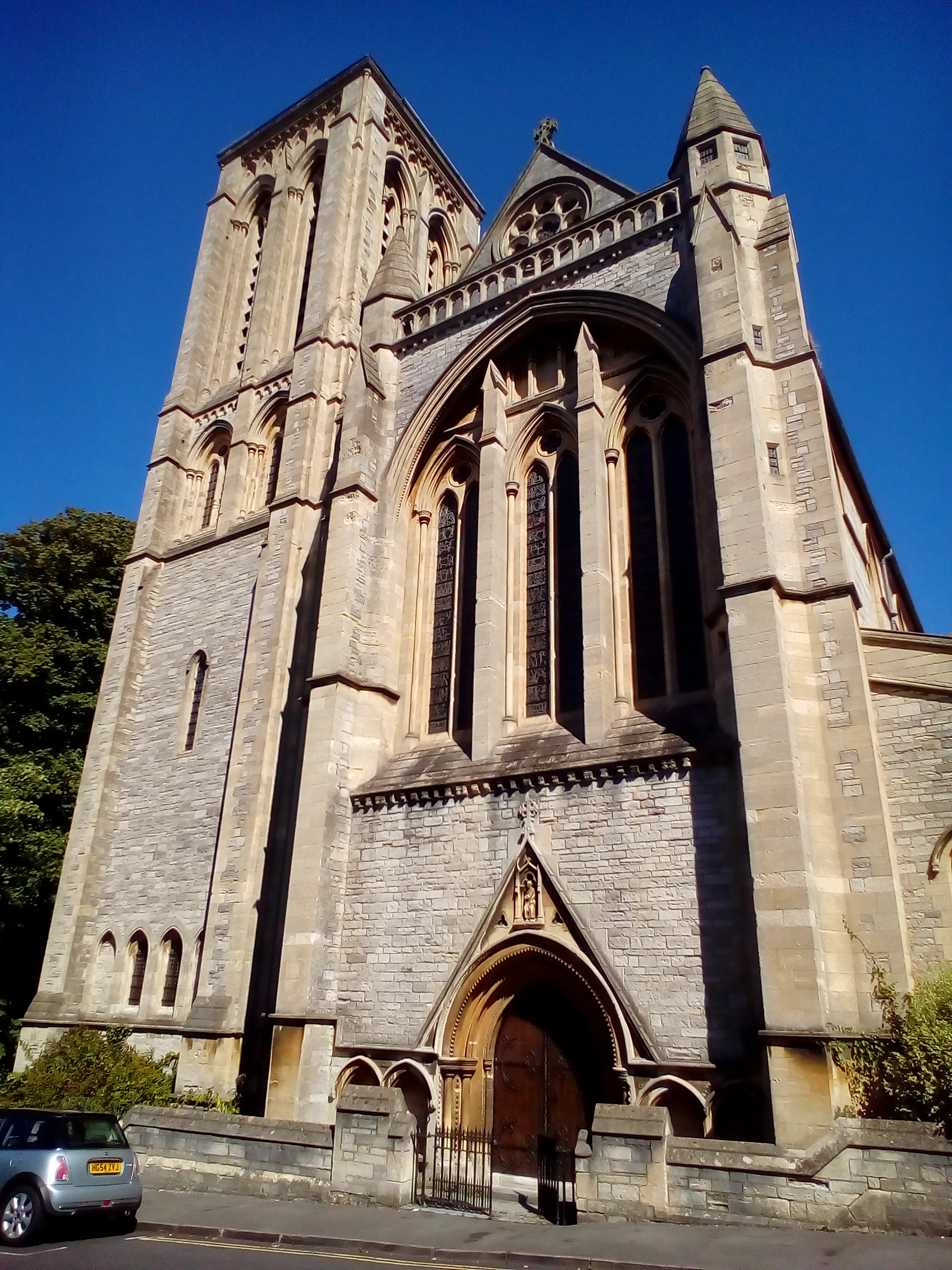
Front door view

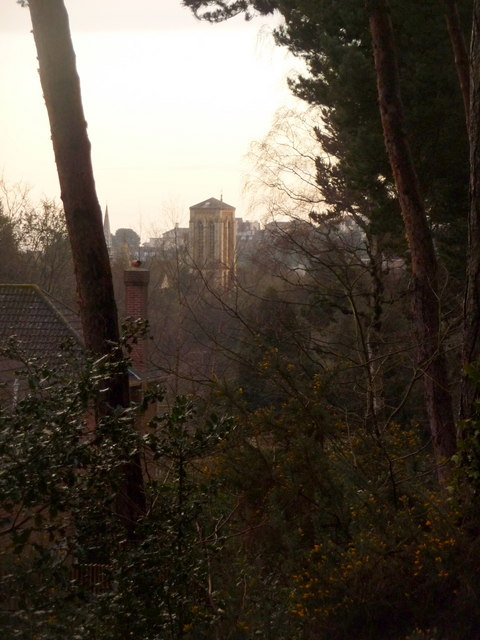
Viewed from Meyrick Park

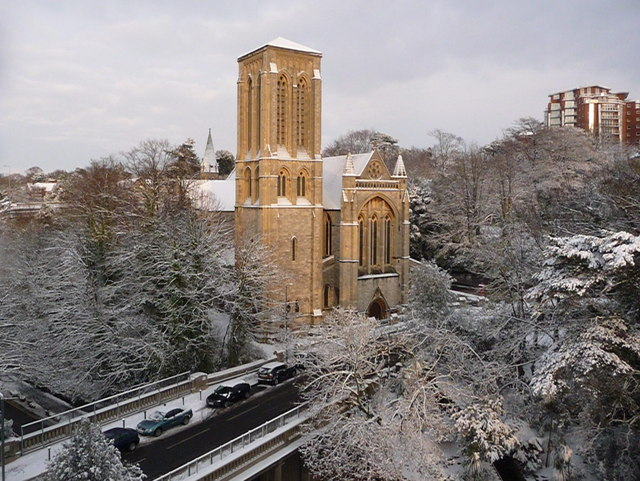
Snow covered church

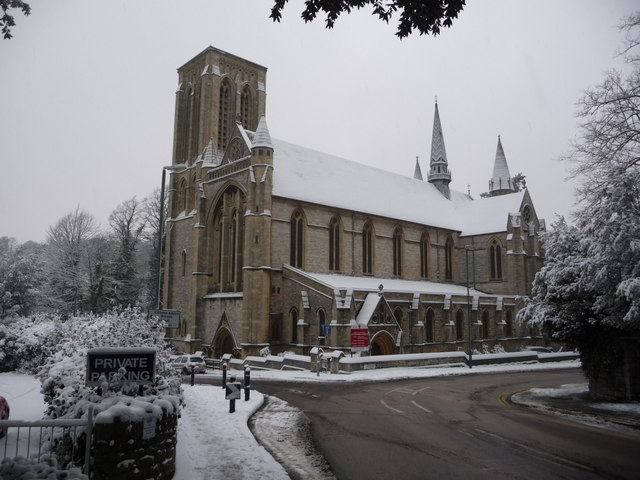
Winter scene

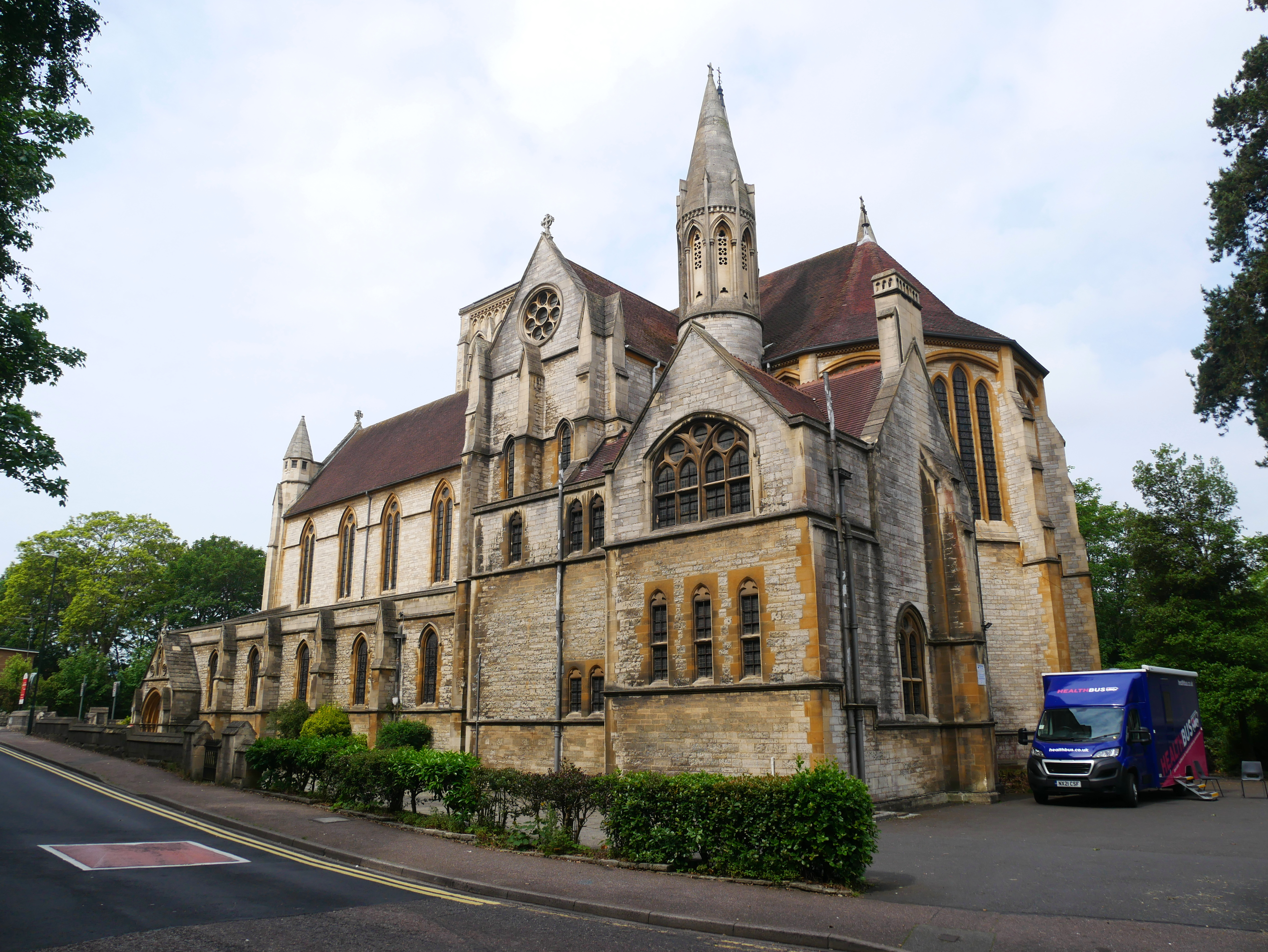
View from the southeast

== See also ==
- List of new ecclesiastical buildings by J. L. Pearson
