= Vic Atkinson =

Australian rules footballer

Personal information
- Full name: Victor John Atkinson
- Born: 31 March 1921; Northcote, Victoria
- Died: 26 April 2011 (aged 90); Box Hill, Victoria
- Original team: Box Hill
- Height: 182 cm (6 ft 0 in)
- Weight: 76 kg (168 lb)

Playing career^{1}
Years	Club	Games (Goals)
1944	Hawthorn	1 (0)
- ^{1} Playing statistics correct to the end of 1944.

Victor John Atkinson (31 March 1921 – 26 April 2011) was an Australian rules footballer who played with Hawthorn in the Victorian Football League (VFL).
