= Death of Jurij Sliachtecov =

2011 Suicide case in Meyrick Park, Bournemouth

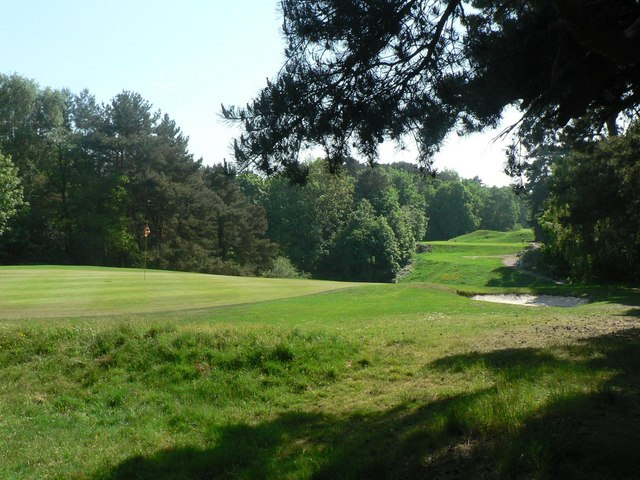
- Meyrick Park, where Sliachtecov's remains were located three years after his disappearance
- Date: 30 April 2011
- Location: Meyrick Park, Bournemouth; 50.731°N 1.884°W
- Motive: Unknown
- Deaths: 1
- Verdict: Coroner's verdict of suicide by hanging

On 31 March 2014, the decomposing remains of Jurij Sliachtecov, a 21-year-old Lithuanian student, were discovered hanging 40 feet (12 meters) up from a tree in Meyrick Park, Bournemouth, around three years after his disappearance. The death was ruled a suicide by hanging, and was not treated as suspicious. No motive was ever established.

== Background ==
Jurij Sliachtecov was a 21-year-old Lithuanian student living on St Peter's Road in Bournemouth, Dorset. Sliachtecov had a girlfriend and maintained regular contact with his family in Lithuania.

== Disappearance ==
On 29 April 2011, Sliachtecov spent the evening with friends in Bournemouth town centre. He was last seen alive on the morning of 30 April 2011, withdrawing money from an ATM on Old Christchurch Road.

On 1 May 2011 at 5pm, friends reported him missing to Dorset Police as he did not make a telephone call to his grandmother for Mother’s Day, something that he had never forgotten about before. It was found that he had left his clothing and British bank cards but taken his passport. Originally it was believed he had returned to his native Lithuania, but there was no record of him doing so. When the police conducted an investigation, it was found out that Sliachtecov told his girlfriend that "she would not see him again." Appeals were launched in both the United Kingdom and Lithuania.

== Discovery ==
On 31 March 2014, a dog uncovered a human arm and hand in the undergrowth near the fourth hole at Meyrick Park. Dorset Police sealed off the area and launched a search the following day with a sniffer dog team.

On 1 April 2014, the decomposed skeletal remains of Sliachtecov were found roughly 40 feet (12m) high hanging from a tree canopy off the main golf course. The recovery operation required help from Dorset Fire and Rescue Service. Initially, the remains were in such an advanced state of decomposition that it was impossible to identify whether the body was male or female. The remains were identified as those of Sliachtecov on 4 April 2014 through DNA analysis and items recovered from Sliachtecov's remains.

During the search, policemen at the cordoned area were approached by a man in his forties who resided in the vicinity of the golf course, carrying two bones wrapped in a clear plastic bag. The man stated that he had discovered human remains at the spot a number of months ago but had removed them and taken them to his home without informing anyone. The man made no further comment and was never charged with any crimes relating to the case.

== Inquest ==
An inquest for the death took place at Bournemouth Coroner’s Court on 12 August 2014. Detective Inspector Mark Samuel from the Dorset police stated that there was no evidence of a murder after the forensic examination of the body.

Evidence presented during the hearing indicated that Sliachtecov had left behind a suicide note at his home, written in Lithuanian, asking a friend to sell his possessions and transfer the money to his grandmother. Additionally, it was found that upon recovery of his body from the canopy of the tree, his remains were found to be holding onto a key chain and beads which had been gifted to him by his girlfriend. The coroner ruled that Sliachtecov's death was a result of suicide by hanging. No motive was ever established.
