= Violet Cowden =

American aviator

- Born: Violet Clara Thurn; October 1, 1916; Bowdle, South Dakota
- Died: April 10, 2011 (aged 94)

Violet Cowden (October 1, 1916 – April 10, 2011) was an American aviator who served as a member of the Women Airforce Service Pilots (WASP) during World War II. Cowden was one of the surviving members of the 1,074 WASPs, who were the first women to fly American military planes.

Cowden was born Violet Thurn and raised on a farm in Bowdle, South Dakota. She taught first grade students in Spearfish, South Dakota.

Cowden was issued her pilot's license before the United States entered World War II. She initially enlisted in the a volunteer women's emergency service program following the Attack on Pearl Harbor in December 1941. However, before her basic training began, Cowden joined another all women's program created by Jacqueline Cochran and General Hap Arnold through the Army Air Corps, which came to be called the Women Airforce Service Pilots, or WASP. However, Cowden who weighed only 92 pounds and stood at just 5-feet-2-inches tall at the time, was too short and too light to join the WASPs. To quickly gain weight she ate bananas and drank milk and to make herself taller she tied a wrap in her hair. She successfully gained the eight additional pounds and two inches needed to enlist.

Cowden was commissioned as a member of the WASPs in March 1943. She successfully flew her first solo flight on March 5, 1943.

The WASPs, including Cowden, became the first women in US history to pilot American military planes. Cowden and other members of WASP did not see combat during World War II. Their mission was to fly military planes from domestic military factories to training sites or military bases in the United States. Cowden became one of only 114 WASP to fly the fighter planes during the war, including the P-47 Thunderbolt, P-39 AiraCobra, P-63 Kingcobra, and her favorite and the "love of her life," the P-51 Mustang.

Cowden, a long-time resident of Huntington Beach, California, remained very active in community affairs throughout her life. She served as the Grand Marshal of Huntington Beach's Independence Day parade. Cowden was also a member of the board of directors for the Bolsa Chica Land Trust and participated in the city's Veterans Day celebration and beach restorations. She participated in "Living History" in which World War II veterans gave speeches and presentations at high schools in southern California. and was on the Board of Directors at the Yanks Air Museum in Chino, California where they display many of the fighter planes that she flew during World War II and now display her WASP uniform.

Cowden was awarded the Congressional Gold Medal in 2010, as one of only 300 surviving members of the Women Airforce Service Pilots. Supporters had lobbied for the recognition for WASP for more than a decade. She was also the subject of the 2010 independent film, Wings of Silver: The Vi Cowden Story, directed by Mark & Christine Bonn. Among the 10 awards that her film won was the Audience Award for short films at the Newport Beach Film Festival in 2010. (in less than a year it won 5 Audience Awards and 5 Best Documentary Short awards from film festivals around North America).

Cowden went skydiving with the elite Army Golden Knights when she was 89 years old. On her 90th birthday she decided to go paragliding. In 2010, Cowden took part in an aerial mock dogfight over Fullerton Municipal Airport in Orange County, California. And in 2009 she again flew in the Collings Foundation P-51c Mustang, co-piloting and taking the stick for take off, landing and some fast flying in between.

Violet Cowden died at 8:34 p.m. on April 10, 2011, at Hoag Memorial Hospital Presbyterian in Newport Beach, California, at the age of 94.
