= Vakur Versan =

Turkish jurist and professor of administrative law (1918-2011)

Vakur Muhlis Versan (4 January 1918 – 2 April 2011) was a Turkish jurist and professor of administrative law at Istanbul University. He was one of the first legal scholars in modern Turkey.

== Biography ==
Vakur Versan was born in Istanbul which was the capital of Ottoman Empire. After graduating from English High School for Boys, he was admitted to Istanbul University Faculty of Law and received his LL.B. degree in 1941.

In 1943, he started his academic career as a research assistant at department of administrative law in Istanbul University Faculty of Law. He earned Doctor of Law degree with a thesis entitled "Milletlerarası Amme Hizmetleri" ("International Public Services") in 1949 and became an associate professor in 1951 at the same faculty.

After the 1960 coup d'état, he worked in the commission for preparing an outline for new constitution with some famous jurists of Turkey. He became a full professor in 1961.

He lectured in Istanbul University, Marmara University, Boğaziçi University and Columbia University. He served as dean of Istanbul University Faculty of Political Sciences from 1982 to 1985.

He died on 2 April 2011 in Istanbul. His funeral was held at Teşvikiye Mosque and buried in Çengelköy Cemetery on 5 April 2011.

His son is jurist Rauf Versan.
