= Kim Yu-ri =

South Korean model (1989–2011)

Yu-ri Kim
- Born: Yu-ri Kim (김유리); August 29, 1989; Seoul, South Korea
- Died: April 18, 2011 (aged 21); Samseong-dong, Seoul, South Korea
- Cause of death: Suicide by poisoning
- Height: 1.77 m (5 ft 9 1/2 in)

Yu-ri Kim (Korean: 김유리, August 29, 1989 – April 18, 2011) was a South Korean fashion model, who was active from late 2000s to early 2010s. Despite being considered one of the most promising models in the runway scene in South Korea, she died at the peak of her career.

== Biography ==
Kim was born in Seoul, South Korea on August 29, 1989. She began professional modeling in 2007 when she participated in a modeling contest. During her short career she modeled mainly in the runway scene, walking for numerous fashion brands. She also had an endorsement deal with a car brand in 2009.

Her mother died of a heart attack in 2009, and her father died of cancer in early 2011. After that, her grandmother was her only remaining family member.

=== Death ===
On April 18, 2011, she was found dead at age 21 in her apartment in Samseong-dong, Seoul.

Prior to her death she had posted multiple articles about her struggles with being able to be "super skinny" on her blog, which were noted after her death. It is suspected that she died by suicide using poison. However, the autopsy couldn't confirm the cause of death.

== See also ==
- Suicide in South Korea
