= Javier Adúriz =

Argentine poet

- Born: Javier Adúriz; April 16, 1948; Buenos Aires, Argentina
- Died: April 21, 2011 (aged 63); Buenos Aires, Argentina
- Occupations: Poet; essayist; translator; teacher; editor
- Writing career
- Language: Spanish
- Notable works: Solos de conciencia Égloga brusca Canción del samurái La verdad se mueve Esto es así

Javier Adúriz (April 16, 1948 – April 21, 2011) was an Argentine poet. He devoted himself to teaching and contributed to several publications of poetry. He was also editor of the León in the Bidet.

== Career ==
The Omero/poesía Magazine dedicated a special Anthology issue: Vámonos con Pancho Villa y otros poemas (Let's go with Pancho Villa and Other Poems), to him, in 2002. He collaborated regularly in the Hablar de poesía magazine from its foundation. He has written numerous essays on Argentine literature and made versions of English poetry in the collection Traducciones del Dock (Translations of the Dock), which he directed until his death.

== Works ==
- Palabra sola (Single word)
- En sombra de elegía (In the Shadow of elegy)
- Solos de conciencia (Conscience solos)
- Égloga brusca (Sharp Eclogue)
- La forma humana (The human form)
- Canción del samurái (Song of the samurai)
- La verdad se mueve (Truth moves)
- Esto es así (This is the case)

=== Works set to music ===
Several of Javier Adúiz's poems have been set to music by the composer Juan Maria Solare such as:

- Más allá del amor (Beyond Love) (mezzo-soprano, clarinet, viola, cello) (1992)
- Ligia Lieder (soprano and piano) (1994)
- Mala leche (Bad Attitude) (voice and piano) (2001)
- Tiempo (Time) (for choir) (1993)
- Sombra (Shadow) (for choir) (1993)
- Su voz (Her voice) (for four female choirs) (2001)
