= Louis Dufaux =

French prelate of the Catholic Church (1931–2011)

- Bishop Emeritus of Grenoble
- Church: Roman Catholic Church
- See: Diocese of Grenoble

Orders
- Ordination: 29 June 1955
- Consecration: 29 April 1984

Personal details
- Born: 21 October 1931 Nice, France
- Died: 14 April 2011 (aged 79) Nice, France
- Education: Catholic University of Paris

Louis Jean Dufaux (French pronunciation: [lwi dyfo]; 21 October 1931 – 14 April 2011) was the Roman Catholic bishop of the Diocese of Grenoble, France from 1989 to 2006.

Ordained to the priesthood in Nice in 1955, Dufaux was named an auxiliary bishop in Marseille and titular bishop in Accia in 1984. In 1988, he was named coadjutor bishop of the Grenoble Diocese, becoming bishop the following year. Bishop Dufaux retired with the Little Sisters of the Poor in 2006.
