= Christchurch railway station (England) =

Railway station in Dorset, England

Coordinates: 50.738°N 1.785°W

Christchurch
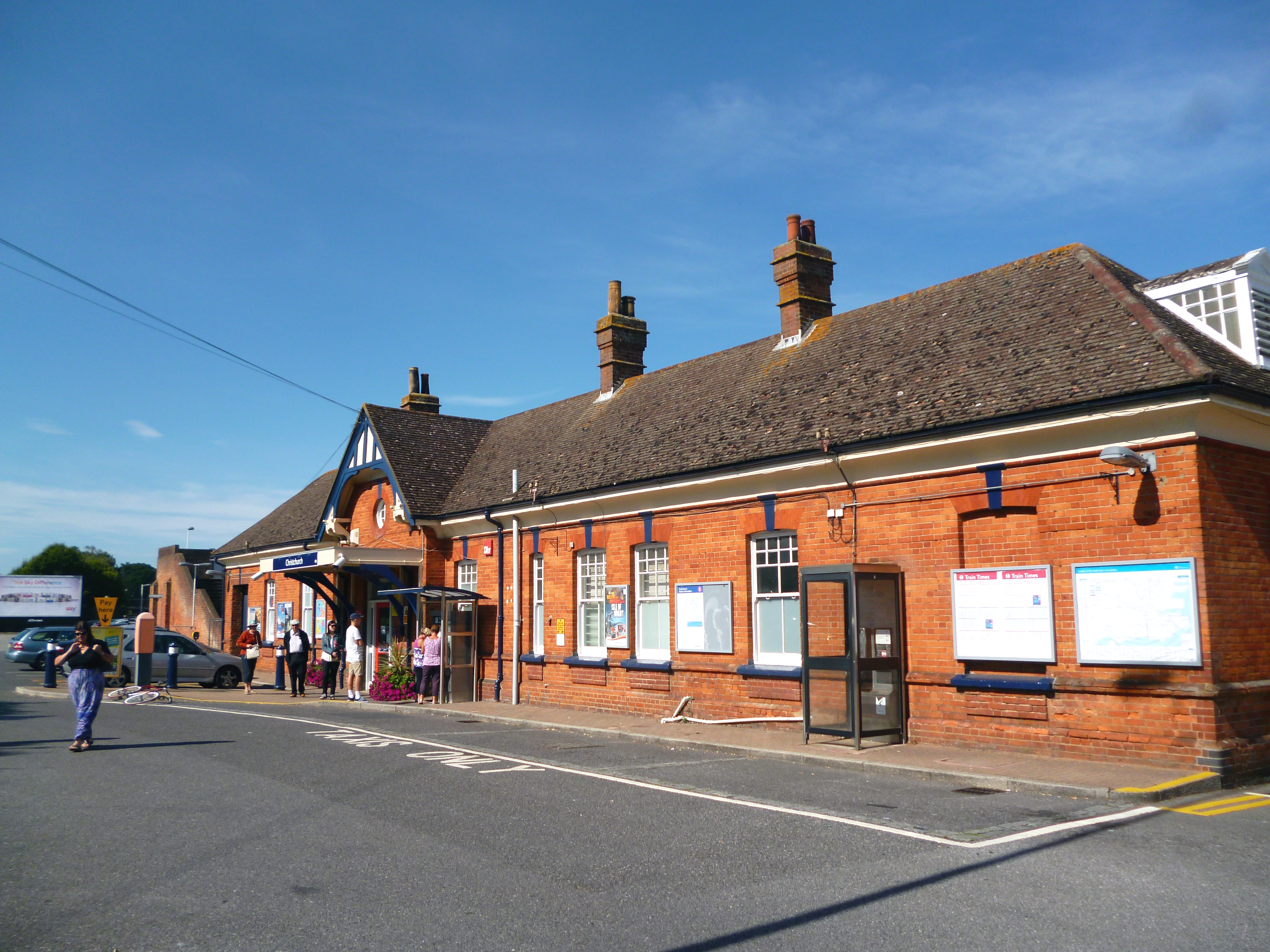
- Station building, seen in 2013

General information
- Location: Christchurch, Bournemouth, Christchurch and Poole; England
- Grid reference: SZ152932
- Manager: South Western Railway
- Platforms: 2

Other information
- Station code: CHR
- Classification: DfT category D

History
- Pre-grouping: London and South Western Railway
- Post-grouping: Southern Railway

Key dates
- 30 May 1886: Opened

Passengers
- 2020/21: ▼0.118 million
- 2021/22: ▲0.338 million
- 2022/23: ▲0.401 million
- 2023/24: ▲0.430 million
- 2024/25: ▲0.484 million
Location
Notes
- Passenger statistics from the Office of Rail and Road

Christchurch railway station serves the town of Christchurch in Dorset, England. The station is a stop on the South West Main Line between London Waterloo and Weymouth. It is at milepost 104 1/4 from London Waterloo. Services are operated by South Western Railway.

== History ==
The original Christchurch station was opened on 13 November 1862 by the Ringwood, Christchurch and Bournemouth Railway; it was sited to the east of Fairmile Road.

Becoming part of the London and South Western Railway, it gained a presence on the South West Main Line. This first station was closed on 30 May 1886 and was replaced by a station at its current site.

The branch from Christchurch to Ringwood was closed in 1935.

The main line through Christchurch was electrified on 10 July 1967.

== Location ==
The station is 104 miles 28 chains (167.9 km) line from London Waterloo. As well as serving the town of Christchurch, the station is useful for reaching eastern parts of Bournemouth.

Road access to the station is from two directions:

- The northern end of Stour Road, near to the junction with Bargates coming from the town centre
- At the end of Fairmile, coming from the direction of Bournemouth Airport and the Wessex Way.

== Services ==
All passenger trains serving this station are operated by South Western Railway, which provides the following off-peak services in both directions:

- Monday - Friday
  - 1 train per hour between Weymouth, Poole, Bournemouth and London Waterloo, semi-fast
  - 1 train per hour between Bournemouth and Winchester, stopping
    - these services join / split at Southampton Central from the fast Weymouth service, giving an additional service each hour for London at peak times
- Saturday
  - 1 train per hour between Weymouth and London Waterloo, semi-fast
  - 1 train per hour between Poole and Winchester, stopping
- Sunday
  - 1 train per hour between Poole and London Waterloo, stopping

Trains are usually formed by Class 444 Desiro electric multiple units.

Preceding station	National Rail	Following station
Hinton Admiral	South Western Railway (South West Main Line)	Pokesdown
	Disused railways	
Hurn	Southern Railway (Ringwood, Christchurch and Bournemouth Railway)	Terminus
