= Ringwood railway station =

Disused railway station in Hampshire, England

Coordinates: 50.8418°N 1.7847°W

Ringwood
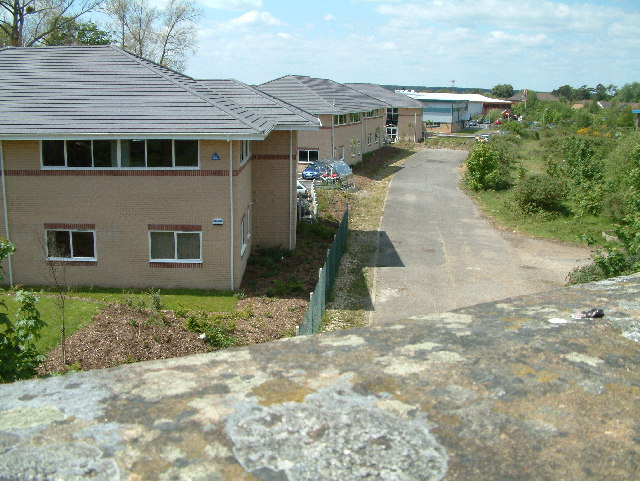
- Site of the railway station, now an industrial area

General information
- Location: Ringwood, New Forest, Hampshire; England
- Grid reference: SU153047
- Platforms: 2

Other information
- Status: Disused

History
- Original company: Ringwood, Christchurch and Bournemouth Railway
- Pre-grouping: Southampton and Dorchester Railway; London and South Western Railway
- Post-grouping: Southern Railway; Southern Region of British Railways

Key dates
- 1 June 1847: Opened
- 4 May 1964: Closed to passengers
- 7 August 1967: Closed to freight
Location

Ringwood is a closed railway station in the county of Hampshire, England which served the town of Ringwood. It lay on the former Southampton and Dorchester Railway, the original main line from a connection with the London and South Western Railway at Southampton, through Brockenhurst to Dorchester.

== History ==
The later development of Bournemouth as a major town led to the building of a branch from Ringwood through to Christchurch, later extended to Bournemouth. This was the Ringwood, Christchurch and Bournemouth Railway.

In 1885, the present main line from Brockenhurst to Christchurch and on to Poole, via what is now Bournemouth station, was opened. The Ringwood to Christchurch line relegated to branch status; it closed to all traffic in 1935.

The Southampton and Dorchester line continued to carry all the trains to Dorchester and beyond to Weymouth until the Holes Bay Curve linking Poole with Hamworthy Junction opened in 1893. From then, passenger trains were mostly restricted to local services between Brockenhurst and Bournemouth West, although at various times there were through services on a daily or weekly basis to places such as Weymouth, Southampton Central and Eastleigh.

With the build-up of holiday traffic in the 20th century, the route also proved a useful alternative to the congested Bournemouth line for summer Saturday trains to Weymouth and Swanage; through goods trains also continued regularly to use the line. The central section of the Southampton and Dorchester Railway from Lymington Junction (exclusive) to Broadstone Junction (exclusive) was closed to passengers on 4 May 1964, one of the first closures following the Beeching Report of March 1963. The line east of Ringwood was closed completely and the track was lifted in 1965; however, public goods services continued from the Poole direction until August 1967 and the track was shortly thereafter lifted back to the RAOC fuel depot at West Moors.

== Line today ==
The station was demolished after closure and most of the site has been redeveloped with industrial units. The trackbed approaching the town from each direction is now part of the Castleman Trailway.

Cast iron canopy columns from the station were used to build a new shelter at Ropley Station on The Watercress Line

A report from the Association of Train Operating Companies (ATOC) published in June 2009 recommended the rebuilding of part of the Brockenhurst to Poole line from Brockenhurst to Ringwood. The report (Connecting Communities: Expanding Access to the Rail Network) looked into the feasibility of reopening disused lines and stations, it concluded that there was a business case for investing £70m in the new link with an hourly service.

In 2023, The Ringwood Society, a local amenity group, were awarded £43,880 by National Lottery Heritage Fund for a project to restore an area of land formerly part of the railway station and for a 'Memories of Ringwood Railway' exhibition and memory capture project. A digital version of the exhibition was added to their website.

Preceding station	Disused railways	Following station
Holmsley; Line and station closed	British Rail; Southern Region; Southampton and Dorchester Railway	Ashley Heath; Line and station closed
Terminus	Southern Railway; Ringwood, Christchurch and Bournemouth Railway	Avon Lodge; Line and station closed

== See also ==
- List of closed railway stations in Britain
