= Bournemouth East railway station =

Bournemouth East railway station may refer to:

- Bournemouth East railway station (1870–1885), a station on the Ringwood, Christchurch and Bournemouth Railway
- Bournemouth railway station, known as Bournemouth East from 1885 to 1899
