= Hurn railway station =

Disused railway station in Dorset, England

Coordinates: 50.7783°N 1.8098°W

Hurn
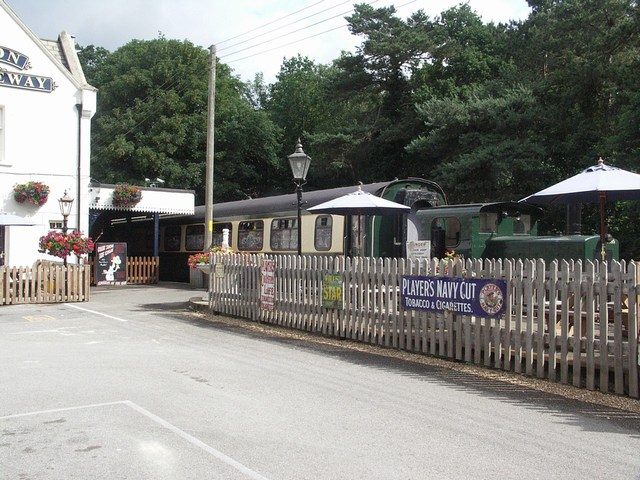
- Pullman Carriage at restored platform

General information
- Location: Hurn, Christchurch, Dorset; England
- Grid reference: SZ137977
- Platforms: 1

Other information
- Status: Disused

History
- Original company: Ringwood, Christchurch and Bournemouth Railway
- Pre-grouping: London and South Western Railway
- Post-grouping: Southern Railway

Key dates
- 13 November 1862: Opened as "Herne"
- July 1897: Renamed "Hurn"
- 30 September 1935: Closed
Location

Hurn was a railway station in the county of Hampshire (now Dorset), opened on 13 November 1862 by the Ringwood, Christchurch and Bournemouth Railway. Becoming part of the London and South Western Railway, it was taken into the Southern Railway in the grouping of 1923 and closed on 30 September 1935.

== History ==
=== Construction ===
The route adopted by the Ringwood, Christchurch and Bournemouth Railway passed through several miles of land owned by Lord Malmesbury who, as a condition of the sale of his land to the railway, required that two private halts be provided: the first to serve his Heron Court (later Hurn Court) residence and the second for his tenants and staff at Avon Cottage. The requirement for Avon Lodge Halt was written into the Ringwood, Christchurch and Bournemouth Railway Act 1859 (c.xcv) which authorised the line.

The station was initially an untimetabled private halt, but later was opened to the public and appeared on timetables from 15 January 1863. It changed its name to "Hurn" from July 1897, having originally opened as "Herne".

=== Decline ===
Closure of the Ringwood, Christchurch and Bournemouth line was first considered in 1920 due to dwindling passenger numbers. The opening in 1888 of a more direct route to London via New Milton left the Ringwood line as somewhat of a backwater. At beginning of the 1920s Hurn averaged just 22 ticket sales per day, this number dropping to only 7 by the end of the decade. Neighbouring Avon Lodge was faring little better and generated some £50 in annual revenue. After the closure of the line's signalbox in 1927, Hurn was staffed by a single stationmaster for the remaining eight years of its life. The final train ran on 28 September 1935, the line officially closing two days later.

== The site today ==
Having remained derelict for many years, the station building and part of the platform were redeveloped into a public house with restaurant, the "Avon Causeway Hotel". The establishment has a railway-theme and a Pullman Carriage together with a shunting locomotive stands on a short section of track at the restored platform and is used for additional dining facilities. The Pullman (No. 340) was delivered to the Hotel at Easter 1979.

== In popular culture ==
The song "Last Train" from the 2009 album The Underfall Yard by Big Big Train centres around the final day of Hurn station's operation, and the station master, Mr. Delia.

Preceding station	Disused railways	Following station
Avon Lodge; Line and station closed	Southern Railway; Ringwood, Christchurch and Bournemouth Railway	Christchurch; Line closed

== Gallery ==
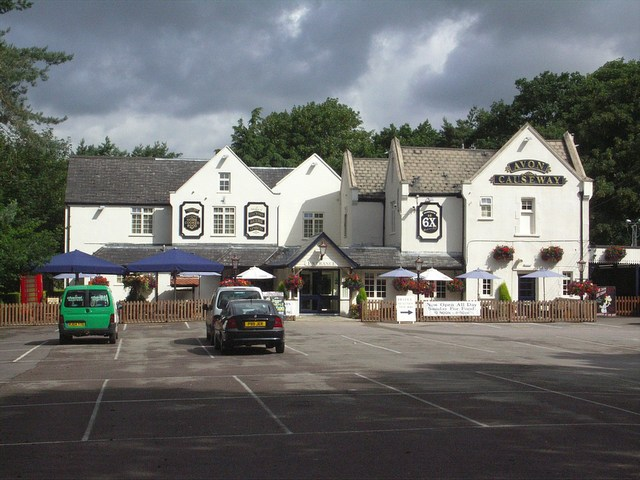
The Avon Causeway Hotel

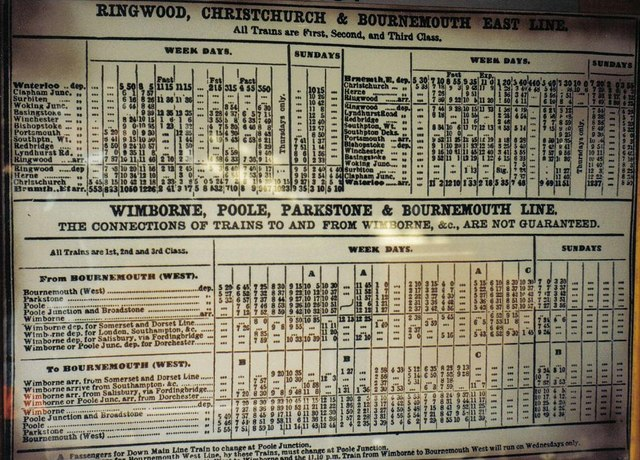
1881 timetable displayed on platform
