= Avon Lodge railway station =

Disused railway station in St Ives, Dorset

Coordinates: 50.83177°N 1.80684°W

Avon Lodge

General information
- Location: St Ives, Dorset; England
- Grid reference: SU137036
- Platforms: 1

Other information
- Status: Disused

History
- Original company: Ringwood, Christchurch and Bournemouth Railway
- Pre-grouping: London and South Western Railway
- Post-grouping: Southern Railway

Key dates
- 13 November 1862: Opened
- 30 September 1935: Closed
Location

Avon Lodge was a private untimetabled railway station in the county of Hampshire (now Dorset), opened on 13 November 1862 by the Ringwood, Christchurch and Bournemouth Railway. Becoming part of the London and South Western Railway, it was taken into the Southern Railway in the grouping of 1923 and closed on 30 September 1935.

== History ==
=== Construction ===
The route adopted by the Ringwood, Christchurch and Bournemouth Railway passed through several miles of land owned by Lord Malmesbury who, as a condition of the sale of his land to the railway, required that two private halts be provided: the first to serve his Heron Court residence in Hurn and the second for his tenants and staff at Avon Cottage (which later became "Avon Castle"). The requirement for Avon Lodge Halt was written into the Ringwood, Christchurch and Bournemouth Railway Act 1859 (22 & 23 Vict. c. xcv) which authorised the line. Section 27 of the act provided as follows:-

That the company shall erect and for ever maintain a lodge at the point where the railway will cross the occupation road numbered 29 on the plans deposited for the purposes of this Act in the parish of Ringwood, being the northern entrance to Avon Cottage, and the owner or occupier for the time being of Avon Cottage shall at all times have the right of exhibiting at that lodge a road signal, being a red flag by day and a red lamp at night, for the purpose of stopping any “ordinary” train to set down or take up passengers; and whenever such signal shall be visible in reasonable time for the purpose, the company shall cause any such ordinary trains to stop at such point, and shall take up and set down passengers accordingly.

Section 40 of the act further provided that the tolls charged upon the line should not exceed per mile 2½d. for each first-class passenger, 1¾d. for each second-class, and 1d. for each third-class passenger.

=== Dispute ===
Avon Castle and its private halt were sold to the Turner-Turner family on 25 June 1863 for £14,300, and the new owner exercised his right to travel on services running both ways on the line. In March 1872 a dispute arose between the owner and the London and South Western Railway (LSWR) which had introduced a new through-service to Bournemouth from London. The LSWR argued that these new services were not "ordinary services" within the meaning of the 1859 act. The owner began an action for a declaration that he was entitled to stop the through-services, as well as an injunction restraining the LSWR from refusing to stop the trains. The railway company argued in its defence that to have to stop the fast services at Avon Lodge Halt would render it practically impossible to run express trains on the line, and that passengers travelling on such services were paying the maximum fares.

Giving judgment on 20 January 1874, Sir Charles Hall V-C rejected the owner's arguments, stating that, in his opinion, the new fast services were not "trains for the ordinary traffic and purposes of the branch line, and are not what are commonly or properly understood to be ordinary trains, particularly considering that they are substantially faster than the other trains; that they only stop at one of the two stations; that they have been put on to meet and be in connection with fast trains on the main line, and that they materially shorten the through journeys."

=== Decline ===
Closure of the Ringwood, Christchurch and Bournemouth line was first considered in 1920 due to dwindling passenger numbers. The opening in 1888 of a more direct route to London via New Milton left the Ringwood line as somewhat of a backwater. At the time Avon Lodge was generating some £50 in annual revenue, and neighbouring Hurn was doing little better.

Avon Castle became the seat of the Earl of Egmont from 1912 to 1938, although after 1932 the family saw little use for their private halt as the 11th Earl preferred to spend his time in Canada. This paved the way to the eventually closing of the station in 1935. When the Egmonts disposed of their estate in 1938, it was acquired by a developer who converted Avon Castle first into offices and then to multiple residences, as they remain today.

== The site today ==
The site of the station has been redeveloped into the Avon Castle Drive road serving the private estate of the same name which has been constructed in the area.

Preceding station	Disused railways	Following station
Ringwood; Line and station closed	Southern Railway; Ringwood, Christchurch and Bournemouth Railway	Hurn; Line and station closed
