= Christchurch railway station (1862–1886) =

Disused railway station in Dorset, England

Coordinates: 50.7393°N 1.7820°W

Christchurch

General information
- Location: Christchurch, Dorset; England
- Grid reference: SZ154934
- Platforms: 1

Other information
- Status: Disused

History
- Original company: Ringwood, Christchurch and Bournemouth Railway
- Pre-grouping: London and South Western Railway

Key dates
- 13 November 1862: Opened
- 30 May 1886: Closed
Location

Christchurch was a railway station in Christchurch in Dorset, England. It was opened on 13 November 1862 by the Ringwood, Christchurch and Bournemouth Railway. Becoming part of the London and South Western Railway, it was closed on 30 May 1886, and replaced by the current Christchurch railway station located to the west of the newly created junction with the rail route to Hinton Admiral, New Milton, Sway and Brockenhurst. In 1935 the line from Christchurch to Ringwood was closed.

== The site today ==
Having closed to passengers the buildings remained open as a freight depot and sidings were used for the storage of wagons until about 1960. The site is now an industrial estate.

Preceding station	Disused railways	Following station
Hurn; Line and station closed	London and South Western Railway; Ringwood, Christchurch and Bournemouth Railway	Bournemouth East
