= South West Main Line =

British railway route linking London and Weymouth

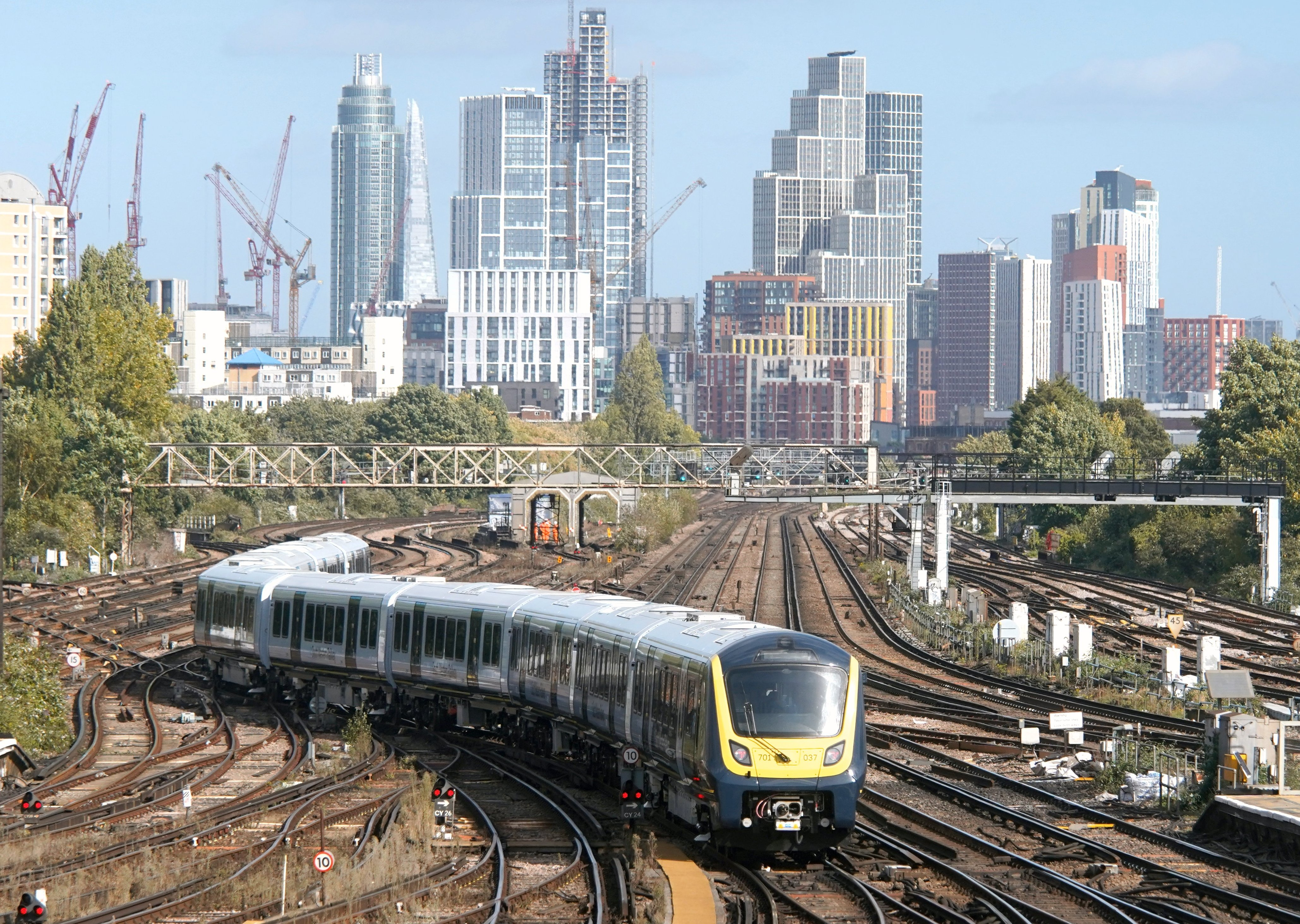
- A South Western Railway Class 701 approaching Clapham Junction

Overview
- Status: Operational
- Owner: Network Rail
- Locale: Greater London; South East England; South West England
- Termini: London Waterloo; Weymouth

Service
- Type: Main line
- System: National Rail
- Operator(s): South Western Railway; CrossCountry
- Depot(s): Clapham Junction; Wimbledon; Northam; Bournemouth
- Rolling stock: Class 158 "Express Sprinter"; Class 159 "South Western Turbo"; Class 220 "Voyager"; Class 221 "Super Voyager"; Class 444 "Desiro"; Class 450 "Desiro"; Class 458 "Juniper"; Class 701 "Arterio"

History
- Opened: 1838–1840

Technical
- Line length: 142 miles 64 chains (229.8 km)
- Number of tracks: 4 (Waterloo–Basingstoke); 2 (Basingstoke–Moreton); 1 (Moreton–Dorchester South); 2 (Dorchester South–Weymouth)
- Track gauge: 1,435 mm (4 ft 8 1/2 in) standard gauge
- Electrification: Third rail, 750 V DC
- Operating speed: 100 mph (160 km/h)
Route map
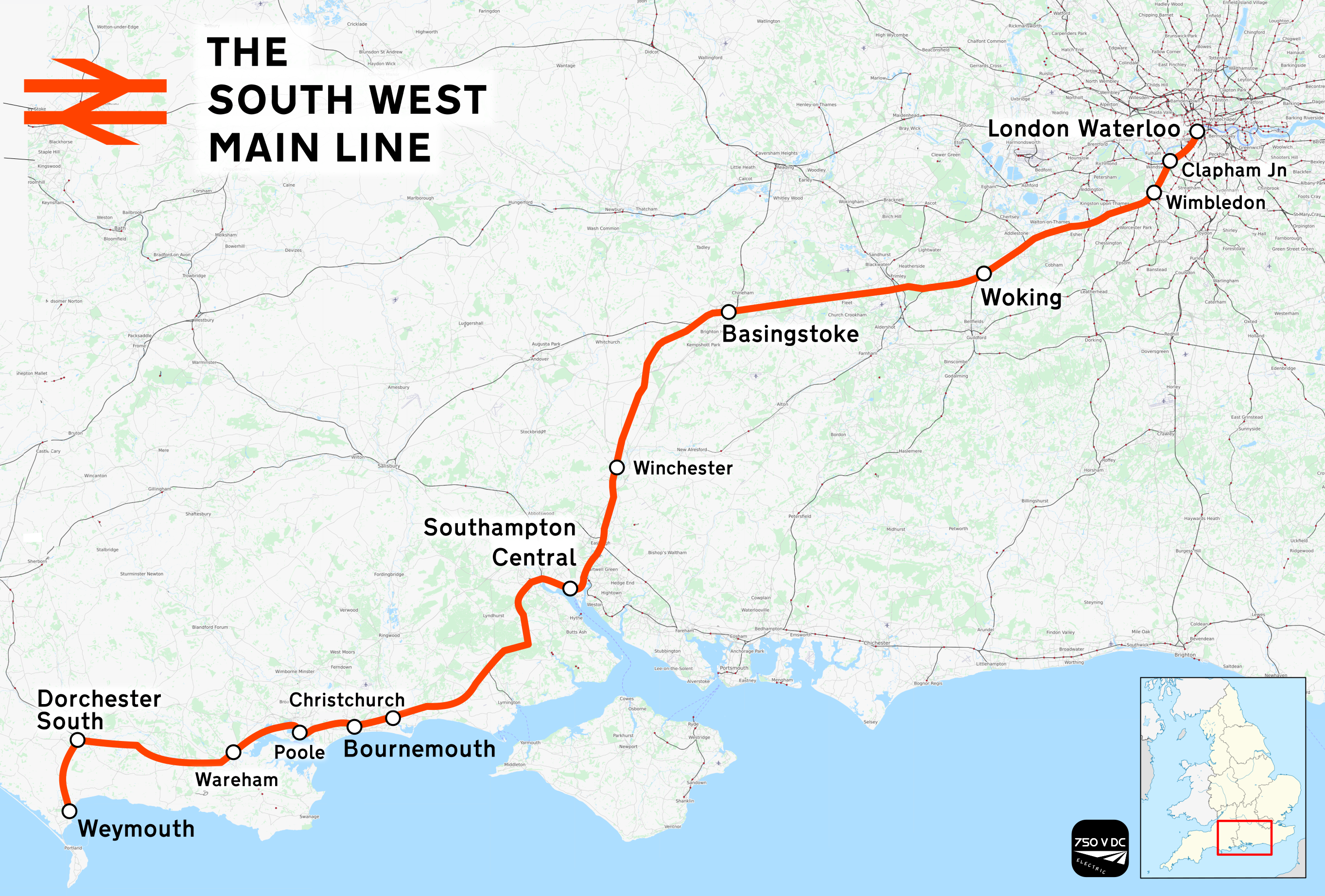
- Miles measured from London Waterloo, except Upwey and Weymouth which are from London Paddington
- † Northam Short Mile - mileage jump from 77 miles 68 chains to 78 miles 0 chains

The South West Main Line (SWML) is a 143-mile (230 km) major railway line between Waterloo station in central London and Weymouth on the south coast of England. A predominantly passenger line, it serves many commuter areas including south western suburbs of London and the conurbations based on Southampton and Bournemouth. It runs through the counties of Surrey, Hampshire and Dorset. It forms the core of the network built by the London and South Western Railway, today mostly operated by South Western Railway.

Operating speeds on much of the line are relatively high, with long stretches cleared for up to 100 mph (160 km/h) running. The line has four tracks for most of its length between Waterloo and Worting Junction, south west of Basingstoke; most of the rest is double track. A couple of miles from the Waterloo terminus, the line runs briefly alongside the Brighton Main Line west branch out of London Victoria, including through Clapham Junction.

== History ==
=== London–Southampton (1830–1848) ===
The first written proposal for a railway line linking London and Southampton was published on 23 October 1830 by a group chaired by the Southampton MP Abel Rous Dottin. The following February, Francis Giles was commissioned to survey the route and a formal scheme, which also included the construction of new docks on the Solent, was presented at a public meeting on 6 April 1831. Giles, who was familiar with the west Surrey and north Hampshire area, having worked as an engineer for the Basingstoke Canal, examined potential routes via Guildford and Farnham. However, his favoured alignment, via Basingstoke, was chosen to facilitate a future western branch to Bath and Bristol. His detailed survey was published on 5 December 1833 and the construction of the line from London to Southampton was approved in the London and South Western Railway Act 1834 (4 & 5 Will. 4. c. lxxxviii) on 25 July the following year. (Note: The London and South Western Railway Act 1834 approved the construction of the London–Southampton main line only and did not authorise new docks on the Solent, which would be the responsibility of a separate company.)

Under the terms of the 1834 act, the London and Southampton Railway company was authorised to issue shares to the value of £1 million (equivalent to £110 million in 2025) and to borrow a further £330,000. Around half of the money was raised from businessmen from Lancashire, with much of the remainder provided by landowners from south Hampshire. Giles had estimated that his route would take three years to build at a cost of £800,000–£900,000. A formal ceremony to mark the start of construction took place at Shapley Heath, near Winchfield, on 6 October 1834, and the contracts for the earthworks and bridges had been let by the end of that month. Giles's strategy was to use numerous small-scale, local contractors, with work taking place simultaneously on multiple sites along the route. By February 1836, just under 10 mi (16 km) had been finished, with a further 12 mi (19 km) completed by the end of August 1836. Shareholder dissatisfaction with progress led to Giles's resignation on 13 January 1837 and his replacement by Joseph Locke.

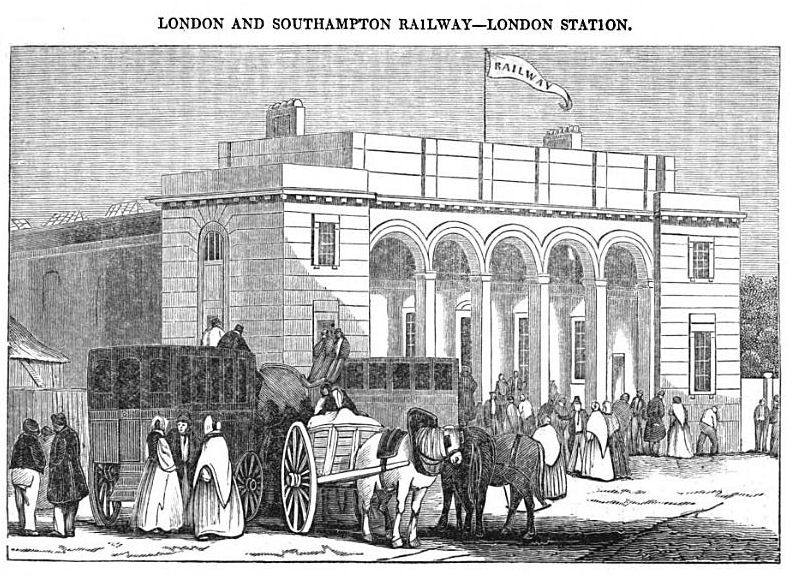
Nine Elms station opened as the temporary London terminus in 1838.

Locke assessed the progress of the construction works and estimated that around £1.7 million (£160 million in 2025) would be required to complete the line. He dismissed many of the smaller contractors, awarding much of the remaining work to Thomas Brassey. He also instituted a more rigorous supervision system by his assistant engineers. On 30 June 1837, the London and South Western Railway Deviations Act 1837 (7 Will. 4 & 1 Vict. c. lxxi) was passed, enabling the company to raise further capital and authorising deviations to the route. (Note: Five deviations from the planned route of the London–Southampton line were authorised by the London and South Western Railway Deviations Act 1837: the longest, of 8 mi (13 km) at Popham, reduced the amount of tunnelling required. The deviation between Walton-on-Thames and Byfleet allowed the line to pass to the north of St George's Hill and to reduce the depth of the cutting at Weybridge. Three minor route changes, at Brookwood, Northam and Southampton, were also authorised.) On 21 May 1838, the first section of the South West Main Line, between Nine Elms and Woking Common, opened with intermediate stations at Wandsworth (later replaced by Clapham Junction), Wimbledon, Kingston (now Surbiton), Ditton Marsh (now Esher), Walton and Weybridge. The extension westwards to Shapley Heath (now Winchfield), with a station at Farnborough, opened on 24 September 1838.

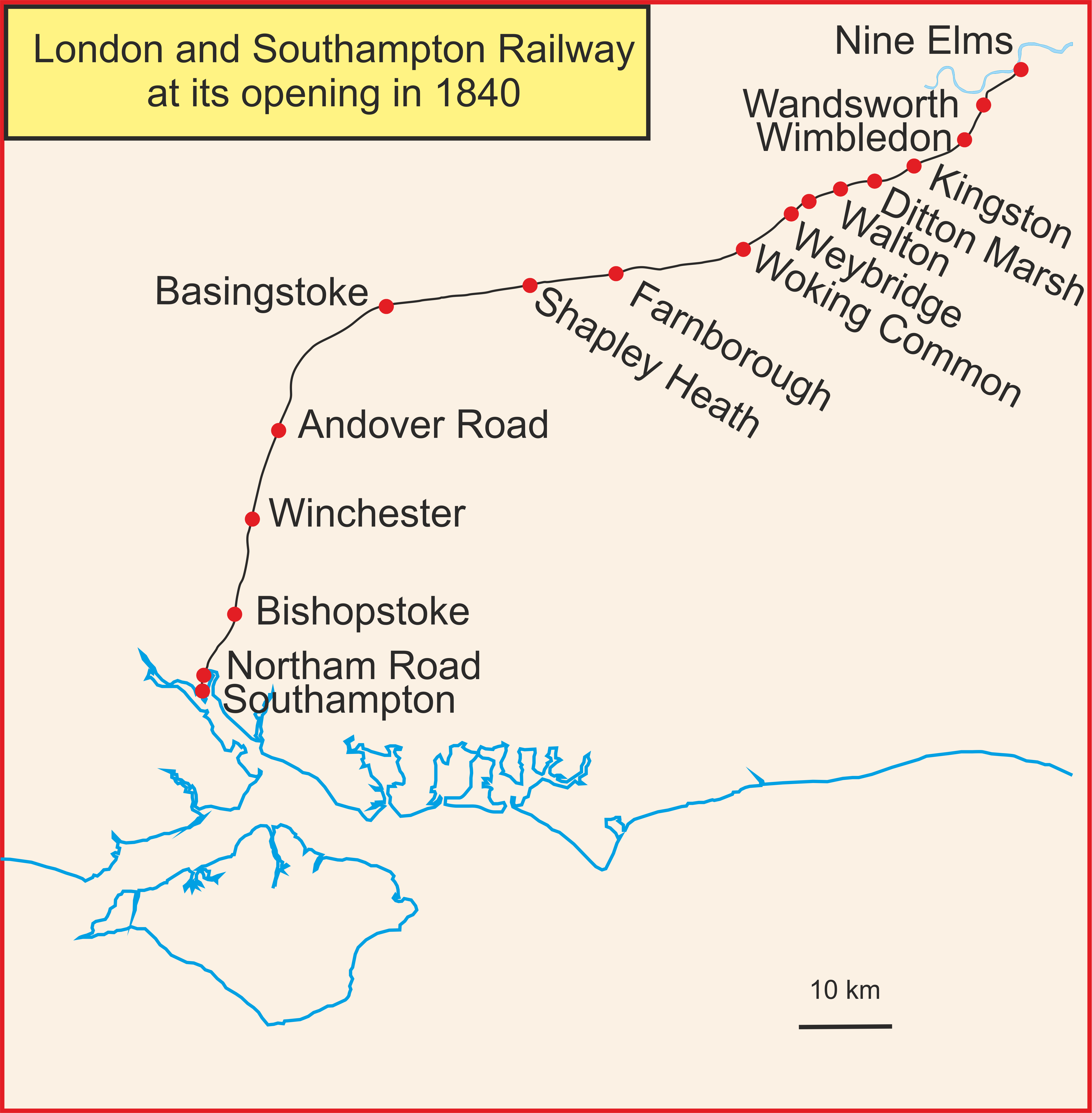
The Nine Elms–Southampton Terminus line on completion in 1840

On 14 June 1839, the London and Southampton Railway adopted the new name of the London and South Western Railway (LSWR). Four days earlier, the first trains had run from Winchester to a temporary terminus north of Southampton at Northern Road (now Northam). The extension from Shapley Heath to Basingstoke also opened on 10 June 1839, and the section between Basingstoke and Winchester, which required three tunnels, was finished in May the following year. The opening ceremony for the completed line from Nine Elms to Southampton took place on 11 May 1840, with a directors' train leaving London at 8 am and arriving at the permanent terminus, designed by William Tite, around three hours later.

Waterloo station on opening in 1848

The LSWR did not intend Nine Elms to be its permanent northern terminus, and in 1844 an extension of 1 3/4 mi (2.8 km) to a new station at Waterloo Bridge was authorised. Three years later, the company acquired the Richmond and West End Railway, which had been authorised to build its own tracks alongside the London–Southampton line between Clapham Junction and Waterloo. Construction of the line north of Nine Elms, known initially as the "Metropolitan extension", began on 11 July 1848. The four-track line was carried on a viaduct of 290 arches, which followed a sinuous path to avoid encroaching on Vauxhall Gardens, the local gas works, and Lambeth Palace. The new terminus, designed by Tite and with four platforms, was initially known by a variety of names including York Road, Waterloo Bridge and Waterloo. On the day that Waterloo was opened, the Nine Elms terminus closed to passengers and was replaced by Vauxhall station.

=== Southampton–Brockenhurst and Hamworthy–Weymouth (1844–1857) ===
In February 1844, a group of Dorset businessmen, led by Charles Castleman, a solicitor from Wimbourne, proposed a railway line linking Southampton to Dorchester. Surveyed by William Moorsom, the Southampton and Dorchester Railway (S&DR) was to take an indirect route to serve as many towns as possible, and its sinuous nature gave rise to the nickname "Castleman's Corkscrew". In particular the line would run via Ringwood, bypassing Bournemouth, which was a small village at the time. Poole, with a population of only 6,000, would be served by a branch from a station at Hamworthy. Castleman hoped to persuade the LSWR to operate the route, but the company refused, fearing that it would not be able to build any further lines west of Salisbury if it accepted. Instead, the Great Western Railway (GWR) agreed to run services using broad-gauge trains. Concerned at this development, the LSWR proposed a rival scheme, the Salisbury & Dorsetshire Railway, which would have paralleled much of Castleman's line. Both proposals were considered by the Board of Trade, which favoured the S&DR, but which also indicated that the route should be standard gauge. The LSWR agreed to lease Castleman's line for an annual sum of £20,000 (equivalent to £2.1 million in 2025).

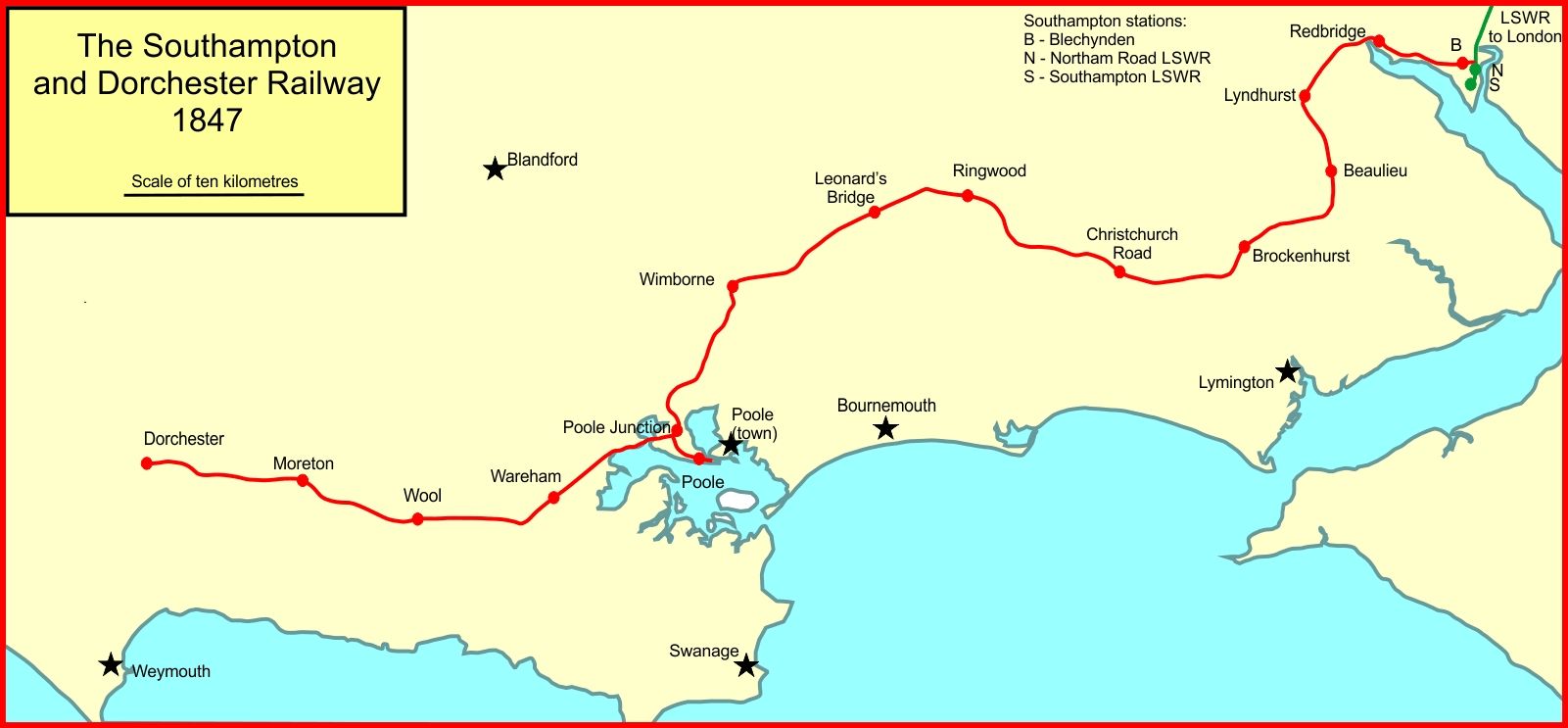
The Southampton and Dorchester Railway (S&DR) on opening in June 1847: Bournemouth and Weymouth were not connected to the railway at this point and Poole was served by a branch line.

The Southampton and Dorchester Railway Act 1845 (8 & 9 Vict. c. xciii) was granted royal assent on 21 July 1845 and, the following month, Samuel Morton Peto was contracted to build the line. Materials were shipped by sea to Poole and the first part to be completed was the section between Ringwood and Dorchester. Wet weather during the winter of 1846–1847 delayed the completion of the eastern half of the line. Difficulties encountered during the construction of Southampton Tunnel meant that the first public trains between Blechynden (close to the site of the present Southampton Central station) and Dorchester ran on 1 June 1847. The link to the LSWR opened on 29 July that year, allowing through running of trains between London and Dorset, albeit with a reversal at the Southampton terminus station. The initial timetable was five trains per day in each direction between Nine Elms and Dorchester, with the fastest services taking 5 3/4 hours. The LSWR was authorised to acquire the S&DR in the London and South Western and Southampton and Dorchester Railways Amalgamation Act, passed on 22 July 1848.

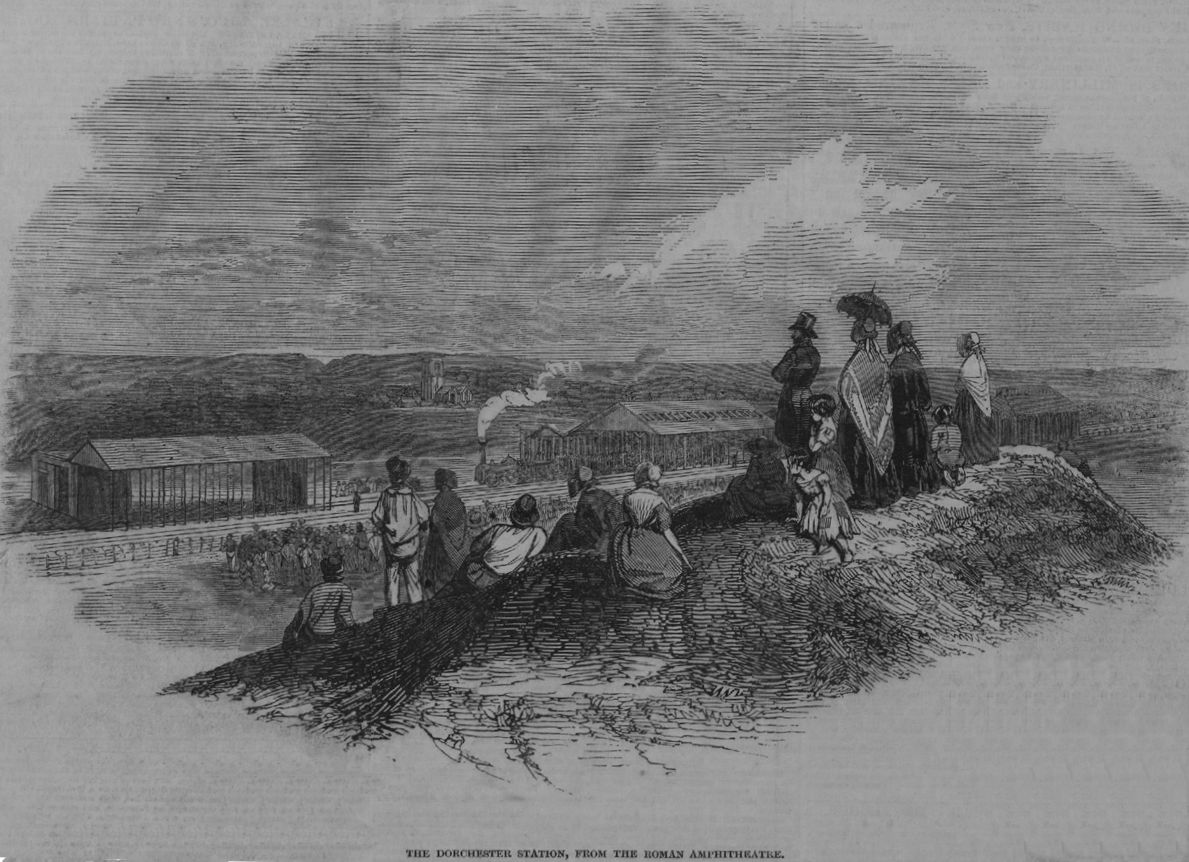
The S&DR Dorchester station on opening in 1847

The Southampton and Dorchester Railway Act 1845 gave the LSWR running rights over the southern section of the Wilts, Somerset and Weymouth Railway. The line, which was taken over by the GWR in 1850, was laid with dual-gauge track between Dorchester and Weymouth to allow both companies' trains to operate. The first trains ran over the new line on 20 January 1857, although trains to and from Weymouth could not call at the LSWR's Dorchester station without reversal.

=== Brockenhurst–Hamworthy (1863–1893) ===
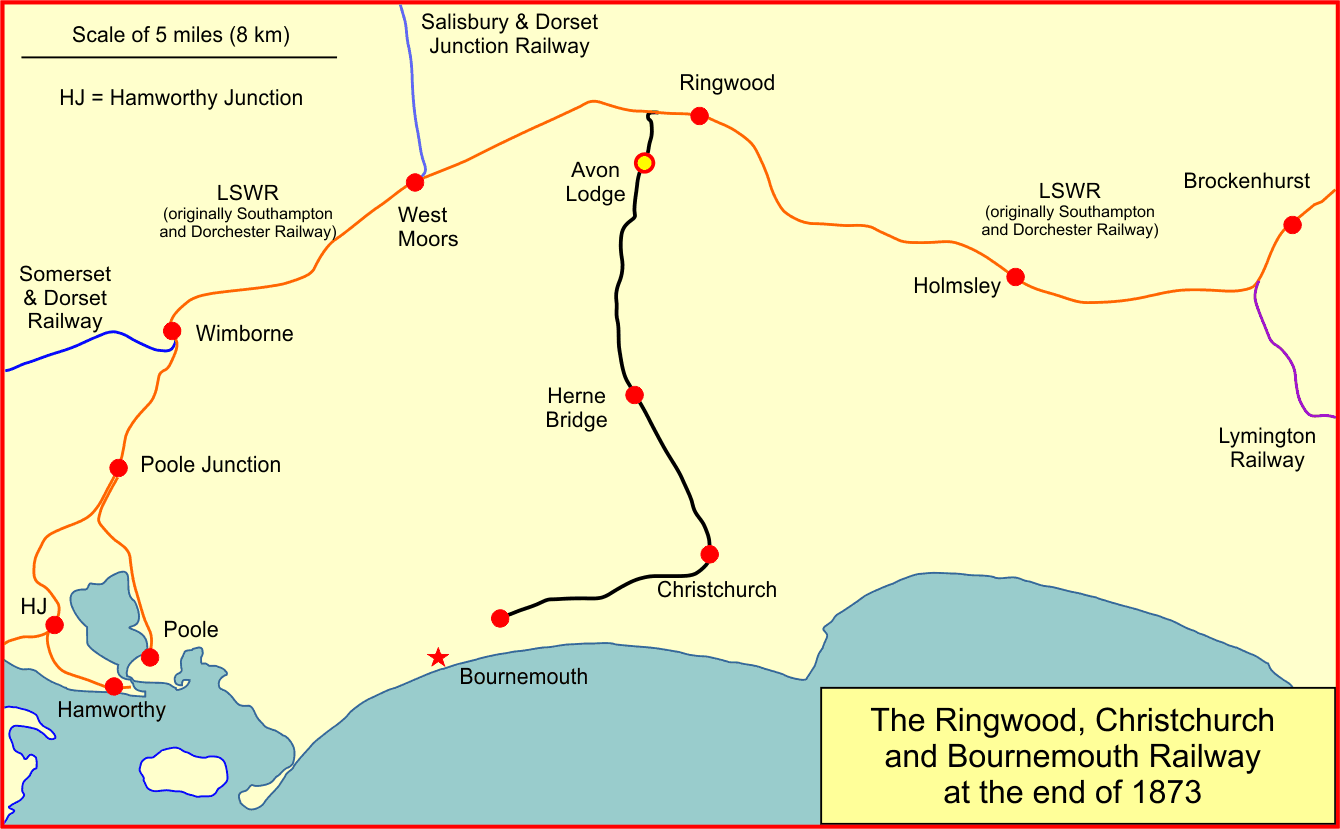
The Ringwood, Christchurch and Bournemouth Railway (black) following the opening of its station in Bournemouth

The section of the South West Main Line between Christchurch and Bournemouth was built as part of the Ringwood, Christchurch and Bournemouth Railway. The company had opened the first part of its line, between Ringwood and Christchurch, on 13 November 1862, but passenger numbers were low. The proposal to continue the line to the growing seaside resort of Bournemouth was authorised by the Ringwood, Christchurch and Bournemouth Railway Act 1863 (26 & 27 Vict. c. cxxxiv). Work on the 3 mi 52 ch (5.9 km) extension began in late 1865, and the single line opened 14 March 1870.

Poole and Bournemouth Railway Act 1865
- Act of Parliament
- Parliament of the United Kingdom
- Long title: An Act to authorize the Construction of a Railway from Poole to Bournemouth.
- Citation: 28 & 29 Vict. c. xix

Dates
- Royal assent: 26 May 1865

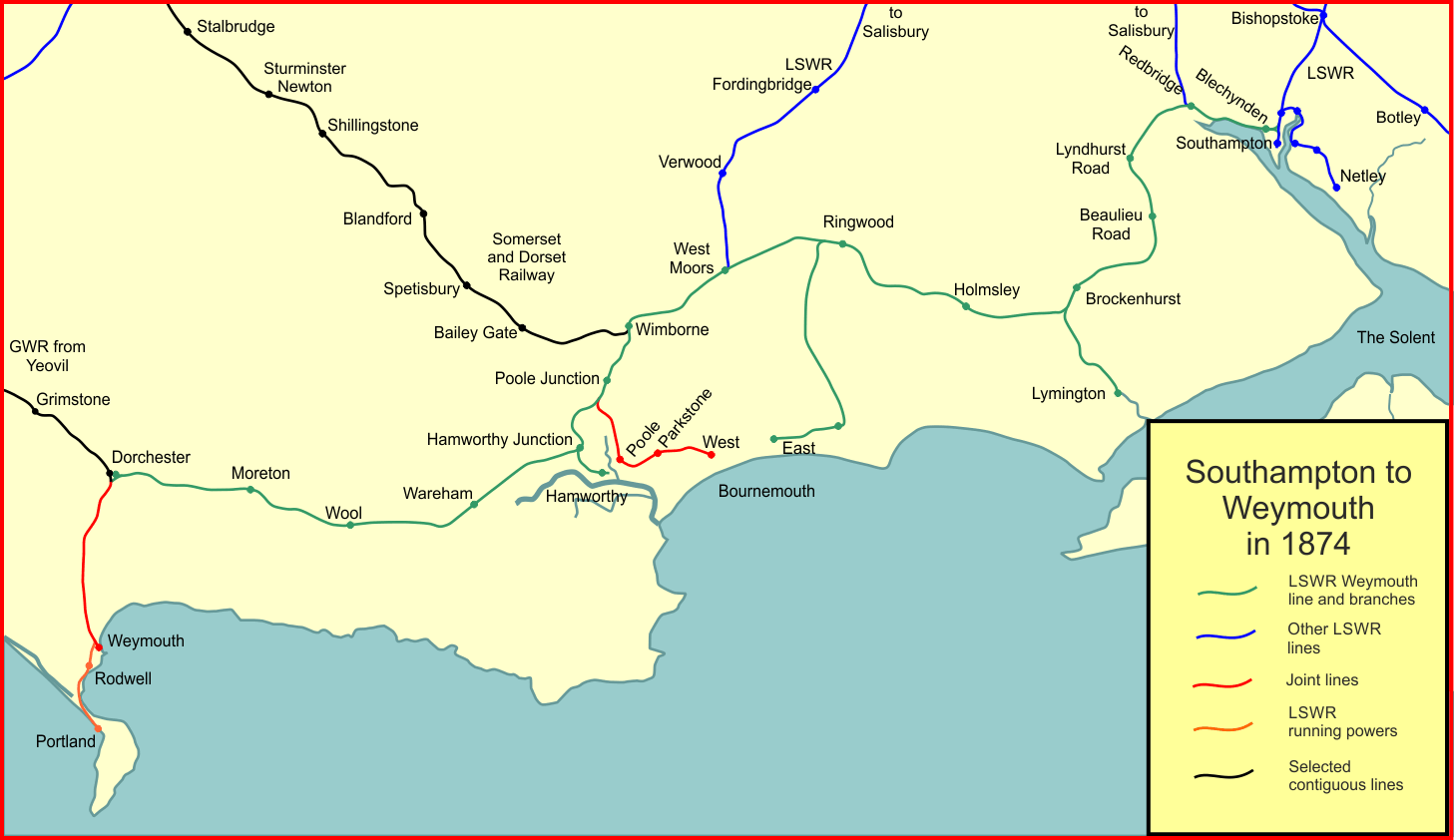
Railway lines in the west Hampshire and east Dorset area in 1874

Until December 1872, Poole was served by a station on the western side of the Harbour Bridge. Through carriages to London had been introduced by the LSWR in May 1860, and the branch line had been doubled in 1863–1864. The second station to serve Poole opened on 2 December 1872 and was served at first only by Somerset and Dorset Joint Railway trains. It was constructed as part of the Poole and Bournemouth Railway, initially an independent company authorised by the Poole and Bournemouth Railway Act 1865 (28 & 29 Vict. c. xix), but taken over by the LSWR in July 1871 under the South-western Railway General Act 1871 (34 & 35 Vict. c. clxvii). The extension to Bournemouth West, including an intermediate station at Parkstone, opened on 15 June 1874.

By 1881, the population of Bournemouth had reached 17,000. The town was served by two stations, neither of which was in the town centre. The LSWR proposed a new station, adjacent to the town hall, on a new railway between the two existing facilities. Local opposition to the proposed link resulted in its route being moved northwards, and plans for the central station were abandoned. Instead, a new Bournemouth East station, designed by William Jacomb with a 350 ft × 100 ft (107 m × 30 m) roof, was constructed. It opened on 20 July 1885 and the new link line was commissioned on 28 September 1886. Pokesdown station, between Christchurch and Bournemouth East, opened on 1 July 1886.

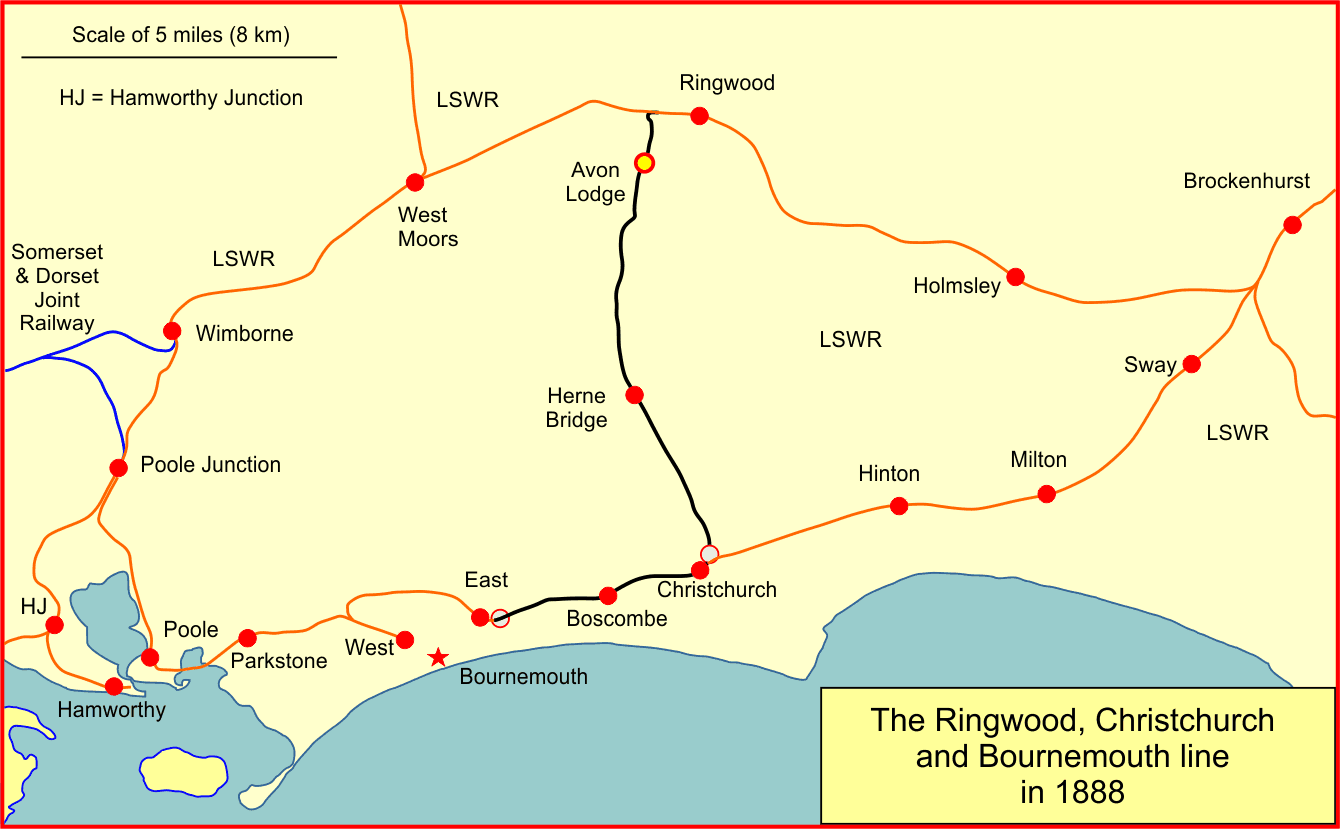
Railway lines in the Bournemouth and Poole area in 1888 after the opening of the link line between Bournemouth East and West stations, and the cut-off line from Brockenhurst to Christchurch

The South-western (Bournemouth, &c.) Act 1883 (46 & 47 Vict. c. clxxxviii), passed on 20 August 1883, authorised the construction of a cut-off line between Brockenhurst and Christchurch, which would reduce the distance between the two by around 7 3/4 mi (12.5 km) compared to the existing route via Ringwood. The works included a new Christchurch station and the doubling of the single line between Christchurch and Bournemouth East, both completed on 30 May 1886. Progress on the 10 mi 38 ch (16.9 km) cut-off line was hindered by poor weather in spring 1887, which flooded cuttings and damaged embankments. The direct Brockenhurst–Christchurch line opened about a year later than planned, on 5 March 1888, with intermediate stations at Sway, New Milton and Hinton. The initial timetable was nine services per day from London to Bournemouth East, with eight in the opposite direction. The fastest trains took around three hours to cover the 108 mi (174 km) between the capital and Bournemouth. Portion working was instituted, allowing trains to split at Brockenhurst, with the front sections running as express services to Weymouth and the rear sections operating as local stopping trains to Bournemouth.

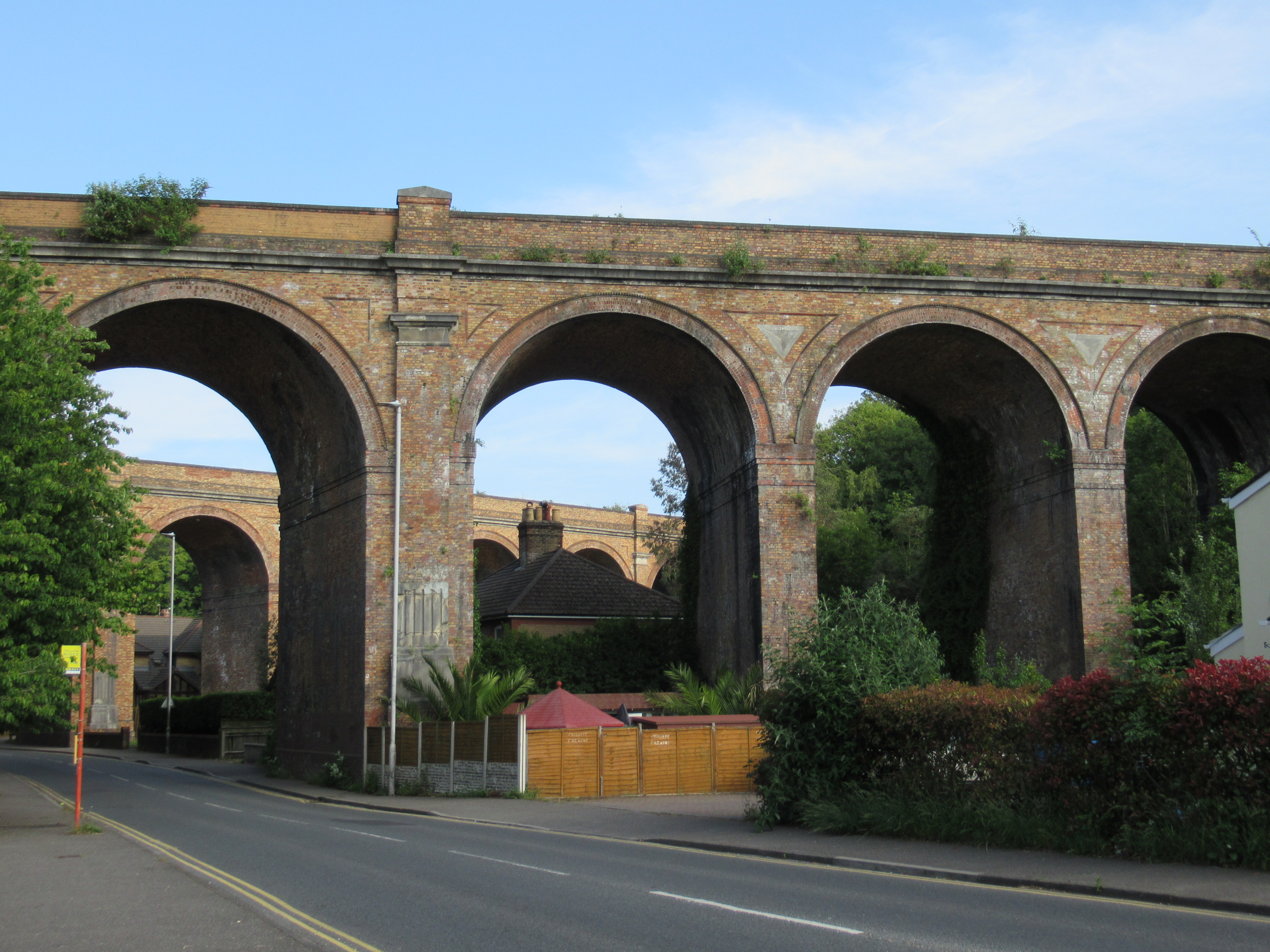
The Bourne Valley Viaducts east of Branksome station: the near structure was built in 1888 and formerly carried the line to the now closed Bournemouth West station; the far viaduct carries the South West Main Line and opened in 1893.

The Holes Bay Curve, authorised by the South Western Railway Act 1890 (53 & 54 Vict. c. liii), was constructed by Lucas and Aird and opened on 1 June 1893. The new link allowed London–Weymouth trains to bypass Ringwood, taking the shorter route via Bournemouth and Poole. Opening on the same day was the avoiding line at Branksome, which allowed trains to bypass Bournemouth West, eliminating the need for reversal.

=== Branch lines ===
The first line to branch from the London–Southampton route was the Eastleigh–Gosport line, opened on 29 November 1841. (Note: Although the Eastleigh–Gosport line had opened on 29 November 1841, it closed three days later as a result of a partial collapse of the Fareham No 2 Tunnel. The line reopened on 7 February 1842.) The line was intended to serve Portsmouth, which could be reached via a floating bridge from Gosport. The station at Eastleigh, originally known as "Bishopstoke", was designed by William Tite, and had opened on 10 June 1839 with the section of line between Basingstoke and Northern Road. A further junction at the station was added with the completion of the Eastleigh–Salisbury line, which opened to freight on 27 January 1847 and to passenger trains on 1 March of the same year.

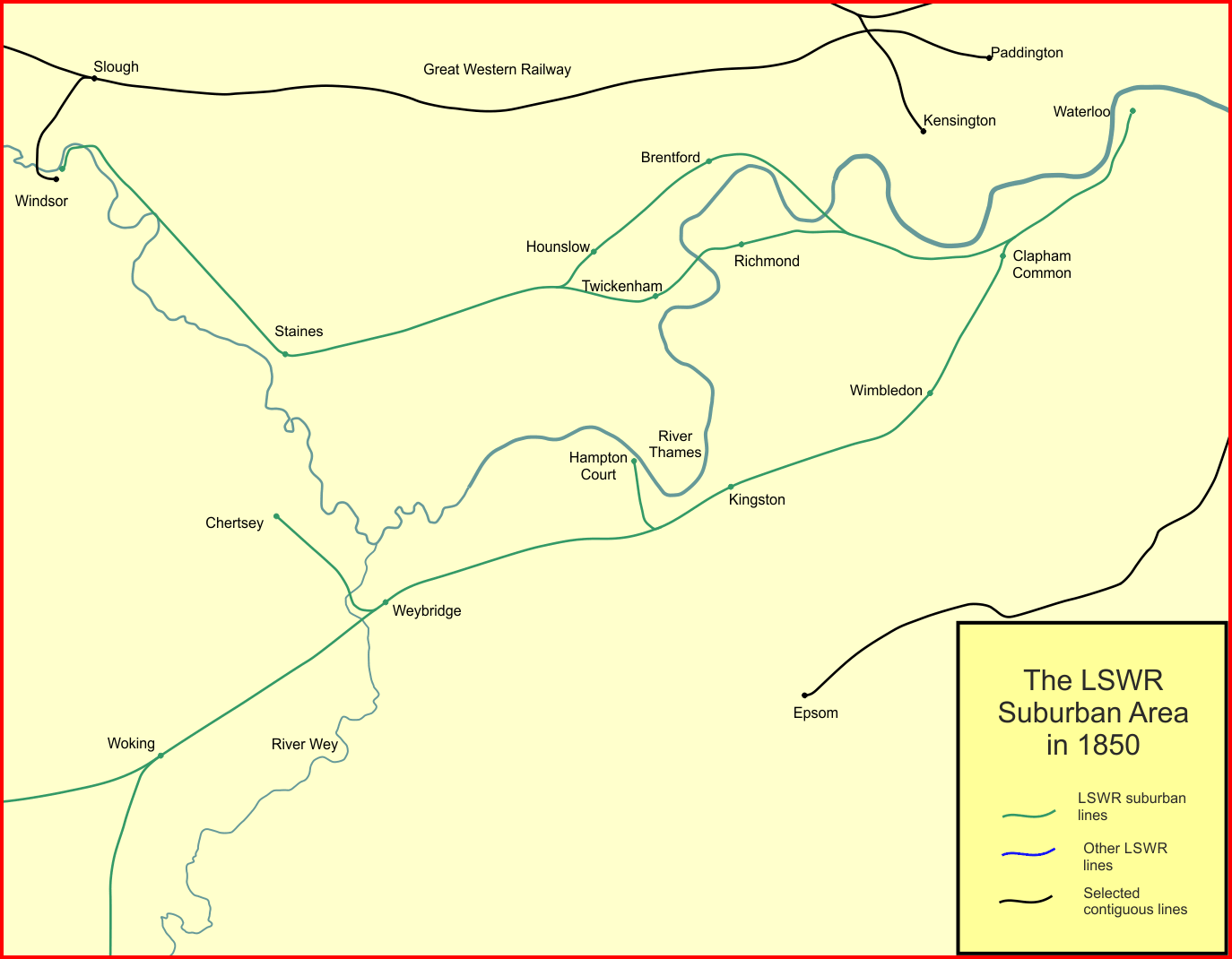
The north-eastern end of the South West Main Line in 1850, showing branches to Windsor (via Richmond and Brentford), Godalming (via Guildford), to Chertsey and to Hampton Court

By 1850, four lines branching from the South West Main Line had opened to serve locations in west Surrey and east Berkshire. The Guildford Junction Railway, which diverged from the South West Main Line at Woking, opened on 5 May 1845 and was extended to Godalming on 15 October 1849. The line to Richmond was opened on 27 July 1846 and was extended to Windsor on 1 December 1849. The branch to Chertsey opened in February 1848 and the branch to Hampton Court opened in February 1849. On 13 November 1854, the London Necropolis Company opened a short branch west of Woking, allowing funeral trains from its London terminus to reach Brookwood Cemetery. (Note: The London Necropolis Company later funded the construction of Brookwood station, which opened on 1 June 1864.) Further branches serving Surrey were opened over the next few decades including to Epsom (4 April 1859), to Farnham via Aldershot (2 May 1870). and to Guildford via Cobham & Stoke d'Abernon (2 February 1885).

New lines were also added in central Hampshire. When proposing its line in the 1830s, the London and Southampton Railway had intended to construct a branch from Basingstoke to the west. Although Parliament had withheld permission for a line to Bath and Bristol in 1835, a branch to Salisbury, authorised in the London and South-western Railway Company's Basingstoke and Salisbury Extension Act 1846 (9 & 10 Vict. c. ccclxx), opened between Basingstoke and Andover on 3 July 1854. The GWR completed its branch from Reading to Basingstoke in November 1848, but there was no direct connection with the South West Main Line until mixed-gauge tracks were brought into use on 22 December 1856. A junction to the north of Winchester was created in October 1865 with the opening of the Mid-Hants Railway from Alton. Two decades later, the city gained a second station, Winchester (Chesil), opened by the Didcot, Newbury and Southampton Railway (DN&SR) in May 1885, although the junction of the DN&SR with the South West Main Line was not completed until 1 January 1891.

West of Southampton, the Lymington Railway Company opened the first part of its line from Brockenhurst to Lymington Town to paying passengers on 12 July 1858, and services on a second branch serving Romsey, the so-called Sprat and Winkle Line between Redbridge and Andover, began on 6 March 1865. The branch from Wareham to Swanage opened on 20 May 1885.

=== Four tracking and grade separation ===
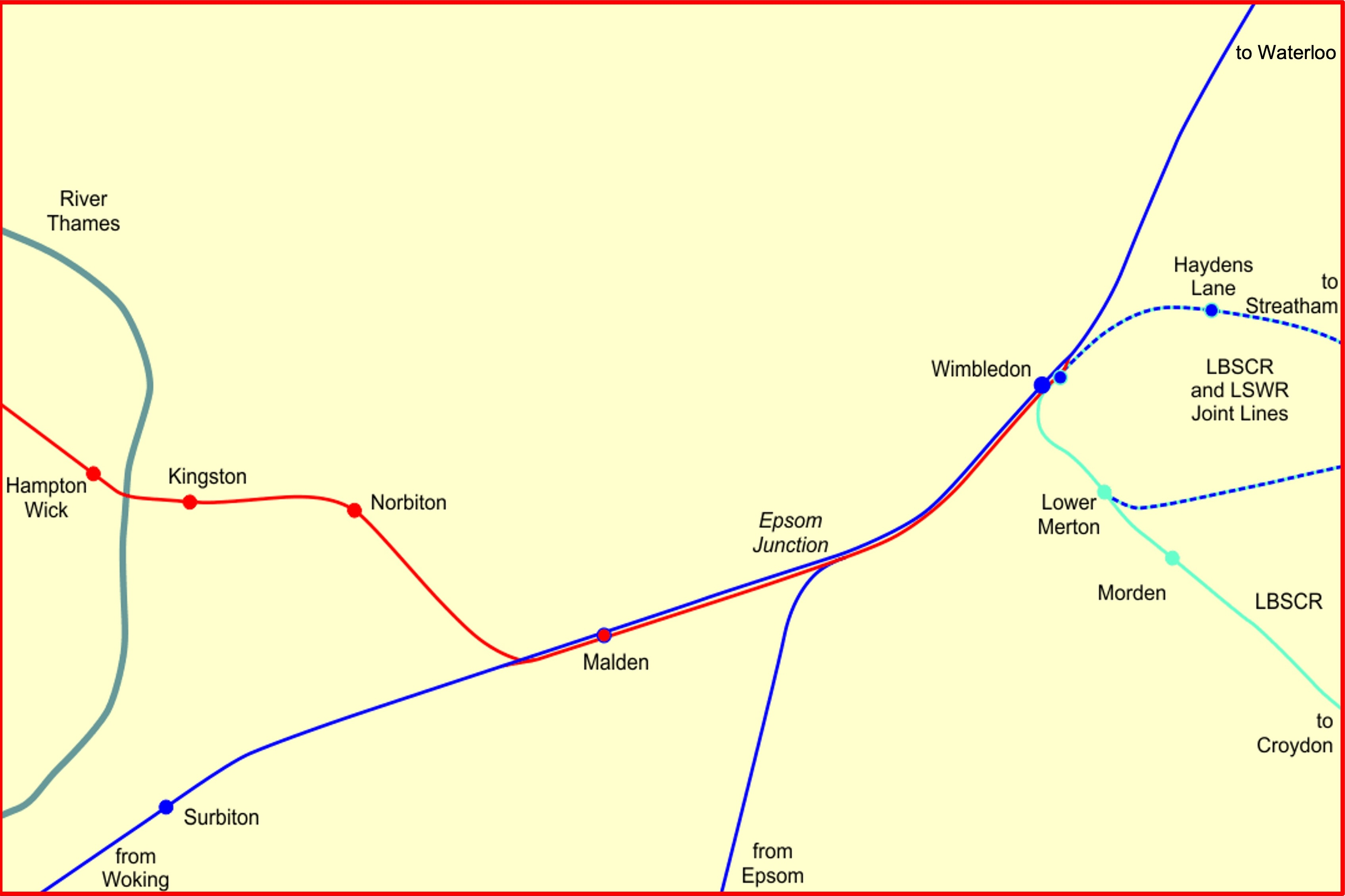
Railways in the Kingston and Wimbledon area in 1869, showing how the tracks of the Kingston Further Extension were laid on the south side of the South West Main Line between Wimbledon and New Malden

Following the opening of Waterloo station and Nine Elms Viaduct, the next part of the South West Main Line to be four-tracked was the section from Wimbledon to New Malden Junction. Opened on 1 January 1869, the Kingston Further Extension (KFE) enabled trains from Kingston-upon-Thames to reach Ludgate Hill via Streatham. The new tracks ran from Kingston via a new station at Norbiton, passing beneath the South West Main Line before turning to run parallel with it for around 2 3/4 mi (4.4 km). The junction at Raynes Park was altered so that the line to Epsom, which had previously been directly connected to the main line, joined the KFE instead. A junction at Wimbledon was installed to allow the existing Waterloo–Epsom trains and a new Waterloo–Waterloo "roundabout" service via the Kingston loop to run. For the next decade, the KFE operated as a two-track railway, but on 24 April 1880 it was more closely integrated with the South West Main Line, when a new junction was created at the west end of Malden station. In Spring 1884, the lines were redesignated from a paired-by-use to a paired-by-direction system, meaning that the original South West Main Line tracks carried trains towards Waterloo and the KFE tracks only carried trains for Surrey, Hampshire and the south coast. Grade-separated junctions at Raynes Park (for the Epsom line) and at Malden (for the Kingston loop line) were opened on 16 March 1884.

The four-track section was extended at both ends in the 1880s. Quadrupling was completed between Malden and Surbiton in 1882, and a second up line was opened between Clapham Junction and Wimbledon the following year, with an additional down line commissioned on the same section in March 1884. The stretch from Surbiton to Hampton Court Junction was widened to four tracks on 29 July 1883, in part to accommodate traffic using the New Guildford line, which opened in February 1885. The approaches to Waterloo were widened in 1891, requiring Vauxhall station to be rebuilt with seven tracks, served by three island platforms. Shortly before the end of the century, the section of the South West Main Line from Basingstoke to Worting Junction, where the line to Salisbury diverges, was expanded to four tracks. Grade separation at Worting was achieved with the construction of Battledown Flyover, which opened on 30 May 1897.

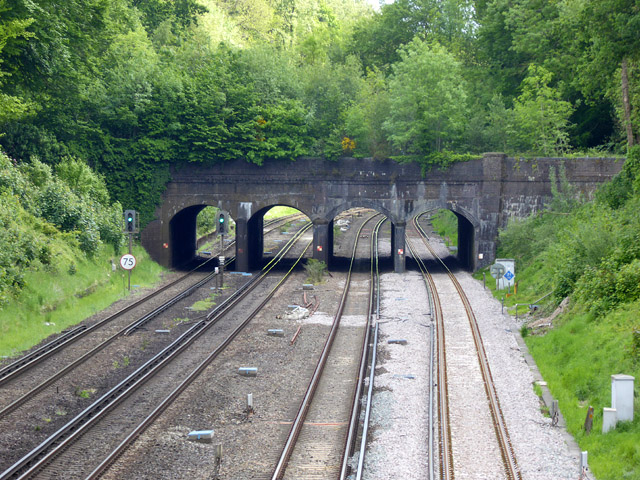
The Frimley Aqueduct, which carries the Basingstoke Canal over the line, was rebuilt for four tracks in 1902.

Four-tracking of the South West Main Line between Woking and Basingstoke began at the end of the 19th century. The section between the Sturt Lane Junctions and the eastern approach to Farnborough was completed on 4 June 1899. As part of the widening works, Pirbright Junction, where the Alton line diverges, was grade separated and the new flyover for Aldershot to London trains opened on 30 June 1901. The project also required the lengthening of Frimley Aqueduct, blocking the Basingstoke Canal for a five-month period, and the relocation of Fleet station around 250 yd (230 m) to the west. Rebuilding Basingstoke station, a major bottleneck on the line, was finished on 18 December 1904 and the quadrupling of the Woking–Basingstoke section was completed on 5 March 1905.

Four-tracking of the South West Main Line between Hampton Court Junction and Woking took place around the same time. First to be quadrupled was the section from Byfleet to Woking, completed on 15 Sept 1901. Two additional tracks had been commissioned at Esher station on 1 April 1888, and the stretch from there to Hampton Court Junction was widened to four tracks on 27 April 1902. A week later, on 4 May, the widening of the section from St Denys to Northam was also completed. Quadrupling between Esher and Byfleet was undertaken in stages and was finally completed on 5 June 1904. The work included the creation of a grade-separated junction at Byfleet.

Further widening between Waterloo and Clapham Junction was undertaken, including the expansion of Vauxhall station to eight platforms and eight tracks. A new down line had been commissioned from there to Wandsworth Road on 5 July 1903, and a new up main relief line was opened between Waterloo and Vauxhall on 24 January 1909. Further grade-separation projects were undertaken between Surbiton and Esher. A diveunder, taking the up New Guildford line under the South West Main Line, was commissioned on 21 October 1908 for the use of trains from Cobham to Waterloo. In order to accommodate the increased frequency of trains post-electrification, a flyover for trains heading to Hampton Court was constructed, opening on 4 July 1915.

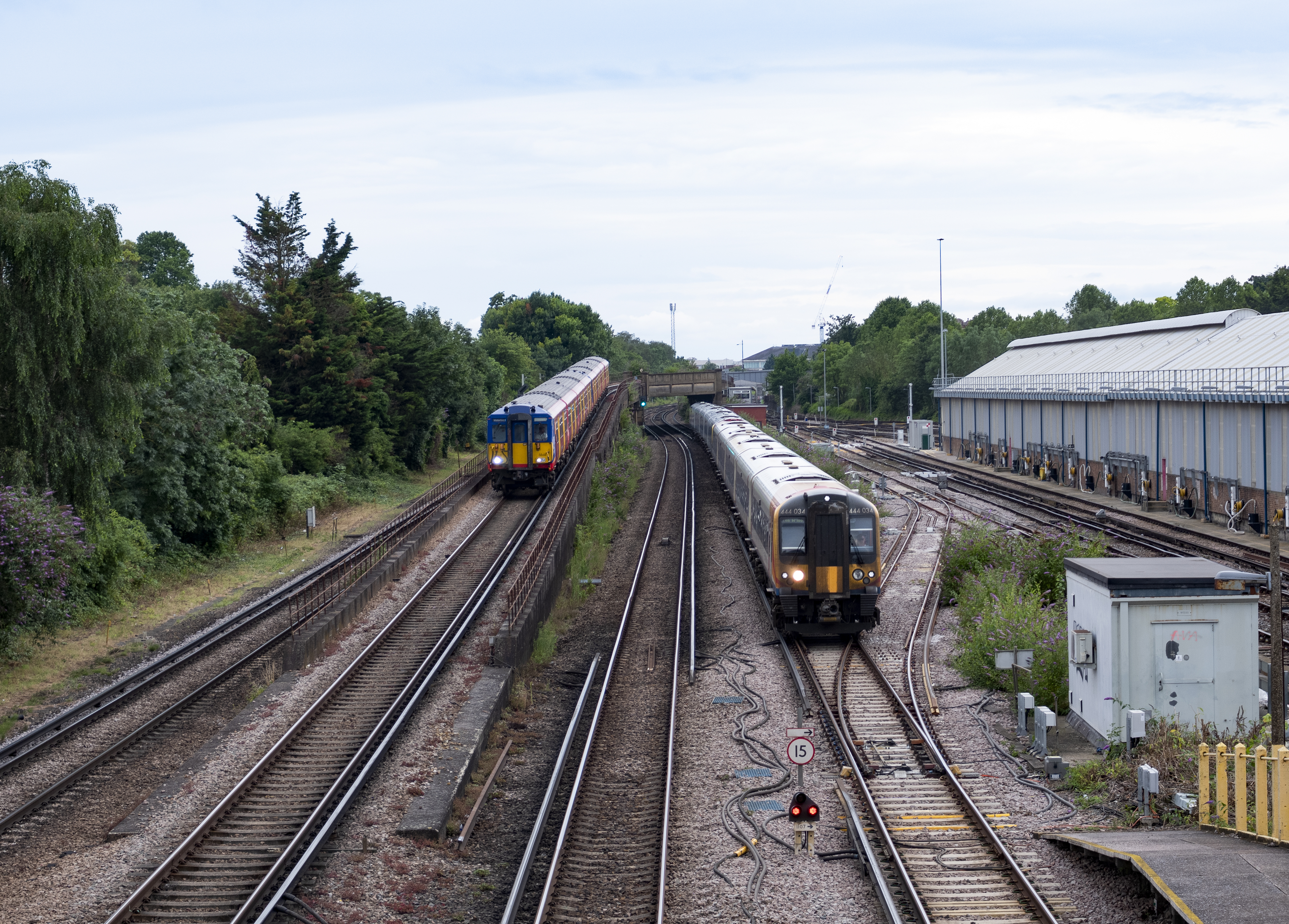
The Class 455 unit (left), operating a suburban service to Waterloo, is descending Wimbledon Flyover, having passed over the fast tracks

The requirement for terminating suburban trains to cross the station throat at Waterloo to access the slow line platforms had been a source of congestion ever since the tracks on the quadrupled sections of the line had been paired by direction. In 1914, to resolve these operating constraints, the LSWR proposed constructing a flyover in the Vauxhall area, but the outbreak of the First World War meant that the project did not progress. Two decades later, the Southern Railway proposed a similar scheme to the north of Wimbledon station. The flyover, which carries stopping trains for London over the fast tracks, has a total length of 700 yd (640 m) and was completed in 1936.

=== Eurostar (1994–2007) ===
The Nine Elms Viaduct and Linford Street Curve, which link the South West Main Line to the Chatham Main Line, were used by Eurostar trains to access Waterloo International between 1994 and 2007. The connection was used again in 2017 to allow Southeastern services from Ashford International via Sevenoaks to run into Waterloo, when London Bridge was closed for works on the Thameslink Programme.

=== Signalling ===
The first signals were introduced to the South West Main Line in 1840. Taking the form of pole-mounted discs, they could be rotated to indicate whether the line ahead was clear or blocked. When presented edge-on to an approaching train, the driver was allowed to proceed, whereas if the face of the face of the disc was visible, the driver was required to stop. By the end of 1847, an electrical telegraph system had been installed along the entire length of the line, giving railway staff the ability to communicate the positions of trains. "Distance signals" were introduced at Weybridge and Farnborough stations in 1848. Installed around 600 yd (550 m) from the platforms, they were used to stop approaching trains, if the line beyond was occupied.

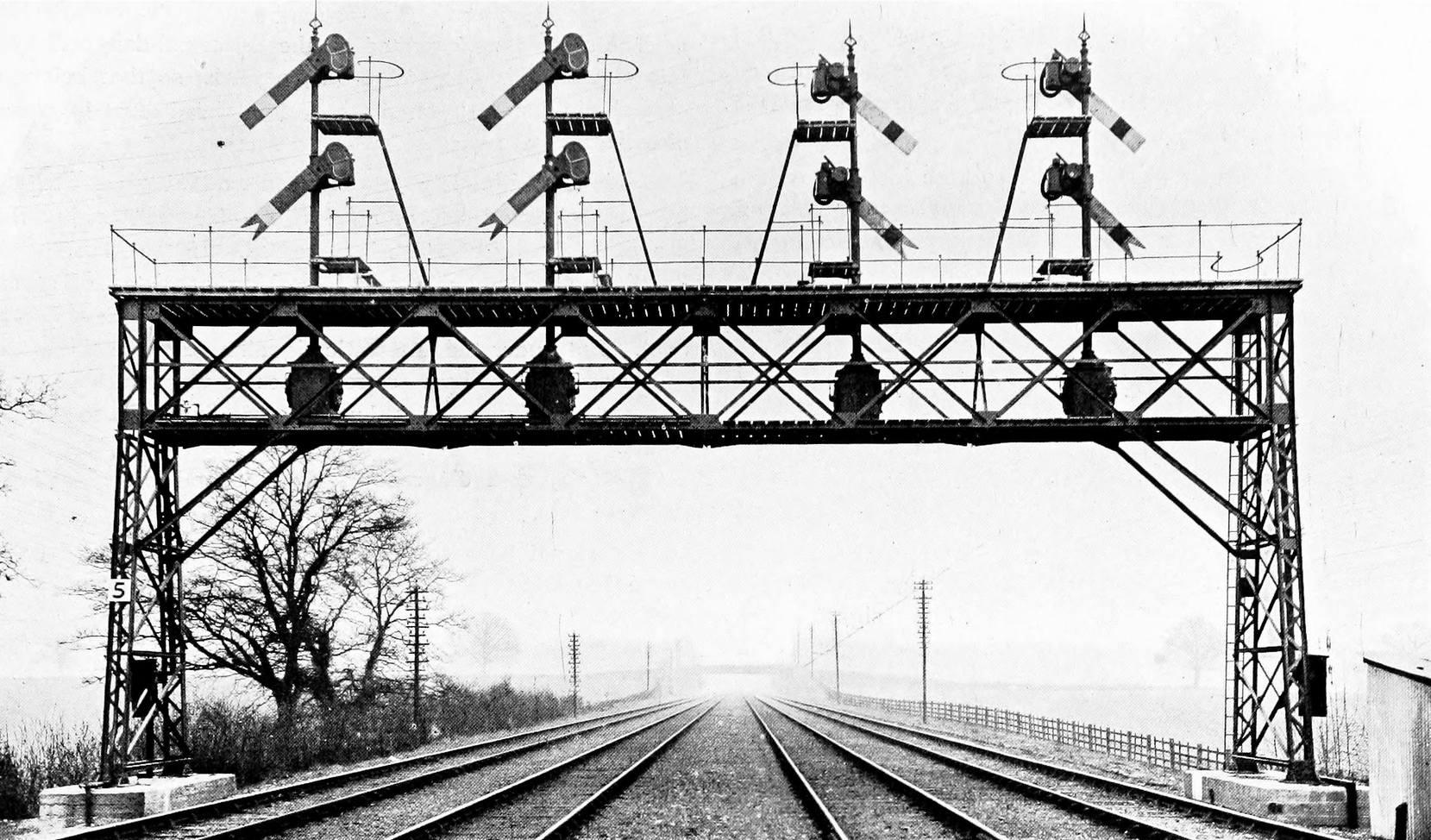
Pneumatic semaphore signals between Woking and Basingstoke in the 1900s

Following a serious accident at Egham in 1864, the block system of working was introduced between London and Woking, and between Eastleigh and Southampton. The final disc signals were replaced with semaphore signals in 1866. In March 1895, the LSWR board agreed to install William Robert Sykes's system of interlocking mechanical block signals between Earlsfield and Hampton Court Junction at a cost of £1,975 (equivalent to £225000 in 2025). Between 1904 and 1907, automatic pneumatically operated signals were installed between Woking and Basingstoke.

Colour-light signals were introduced to the South West Main Line between London and Hampton Court Junction in 1936. Between Waterloo and Nine Elms, three-aspect signals were installed, with four-aspect signals on the rest of the section. The project included a reduction in the number of signal boxes from 23 to 13 and, where necessary, the new signals were equipped with junction route indicators.

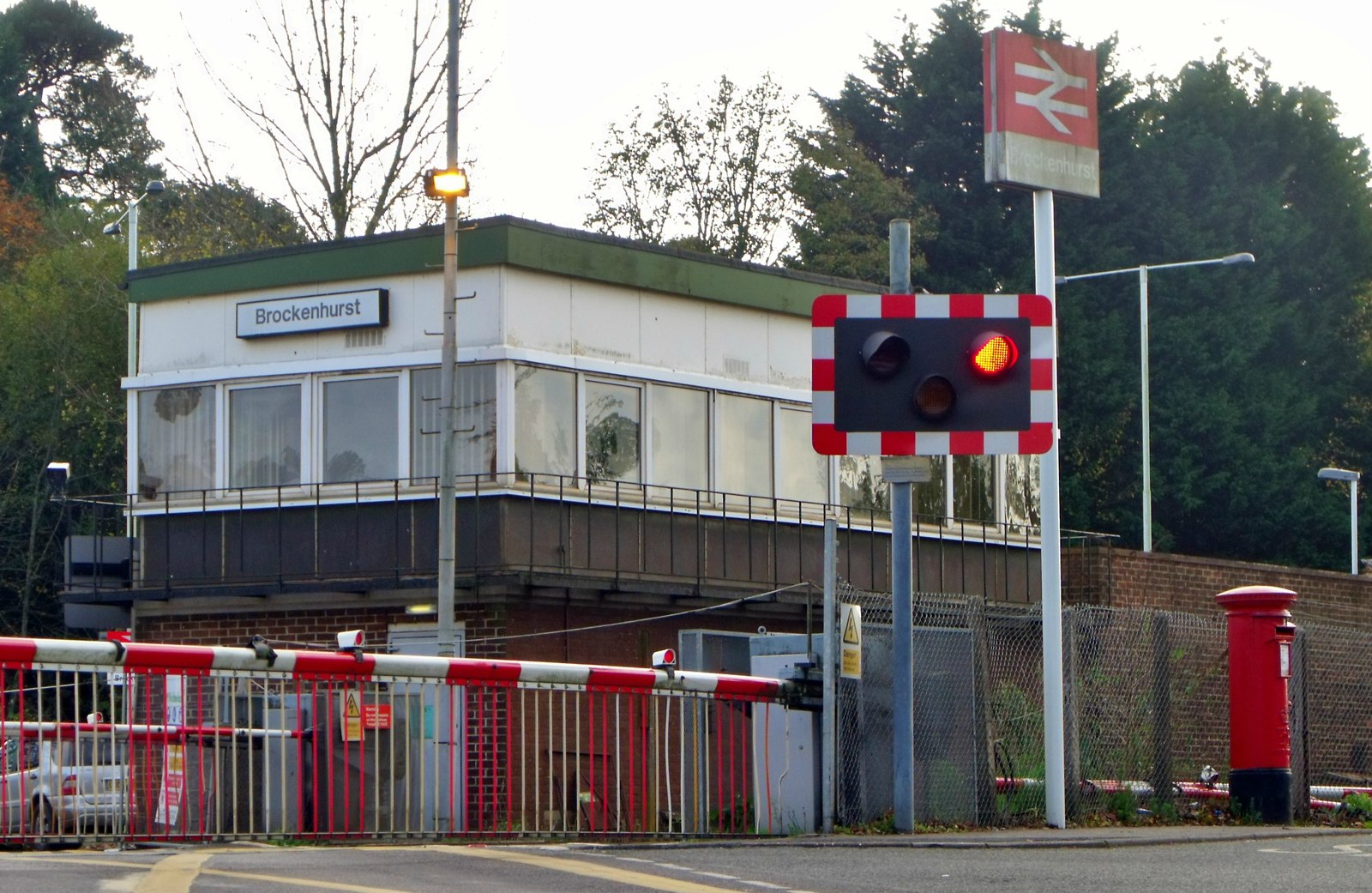
Brockenhurst signal box

Work at the western end of the route transferred the control of the line from Dorchester to Weymouth to a new panel signal box at Dorchester in 1959. A new panel box was also opened at Brockenhurst in 1964. Resignalling in the Southampton area at the start of the 1980s transferred control of the station to Eastleigh Panel Box. The project included the installation of colour-light signals, and the closure of Southampton signal box, which had opened in June 1935.

Two projects in the early 21st century eliminated the final semaphore signals on the line. The 60-lever Bournemouth Central signal box, which had opened in 1928, was closed in 2003 with control transferred to the new Bournemouth Area Signalling Centre. The Poole-Wool resignalling project was completed in May 2014 and resulted in the closure of mechanical signal boxes at Poole, Hamworthy, Wareham and Wool.

== Infrastructure ==
=== Track ===
Between London Waterloo and Clapham Junction, the line has eight tracks. It runs over the Nine Elms to Waterloo Viaduct for much of its length. It crosses beneath the Chatham Main Line where the Brighton Main Line runs alongside it on the southern side. At Clapham Junction, some of these tracks leave on the Waterloo to Reading Line and the remaining tracks are reduced to four. The Brighton Line, which also has four tracks, separates from it shortly afterwards.

The four tracks initially have a pair of "slow" tracks to the east with the two "fast" tracks on the western side. This arrangement continues to north of Wimbledon where a flyover transfers the northbound slow line across the fast lines, leaving the inner tracks being used for the fast services and the stopping services using the outer tracks. This arrangement continues to Worting Junction, just after Basingstoke. Many stations on this section had island platforms which have since been removed - this is evident with wide gaps between station platforms at stations such as Winchfield. The island platforms survive at New Malden, Esher and Walton-on-Thames, although mothballed and out of use.

The line continues as double-track to Winchester but expands to three tracks through Shawford station with one up platform and fast and slow down platforms. There are four tracks from Shawford to Eastleigh. The line from Romsey via Chandler's Ford trails in just north of Eastleigh which is also the junction for the Fareham line. The line returns to double track until St Denys where the West Coastway Line trails in. At Northam the original route to Southampton Terminus carries on south towards Eastern Docks and the main route curves west to enter a tunnel through to Southampton Central station.

The line remains double-tracked most of the way to Weymouth, but there is a single-track section between Moreton and Dorchester South which constrains capacity.

=== Electrification ===
The first part of the LSWR to be electrified was the Waterloo and City Railway, now the Waterloo & City Line, which operated electric trains from the outset when it opened in mid-1898. Over the next five years, the company investigated electrifying some of its surface routes and, in 1903, the resident engineer, J. Jacomb-Hood, told the board that running an intensive electric service over the slow lines between Waterloo and Hampton Court Junction would be no more expensive than the existing steam operation. On 4 December that year, the LSWR signed an agreement with the District Railway to electrify the Hammersmith–Richmond and East Putney–Wimbledon lines. The District Railway's electric trains began running to Richmond and Wimbledon in August 1905.

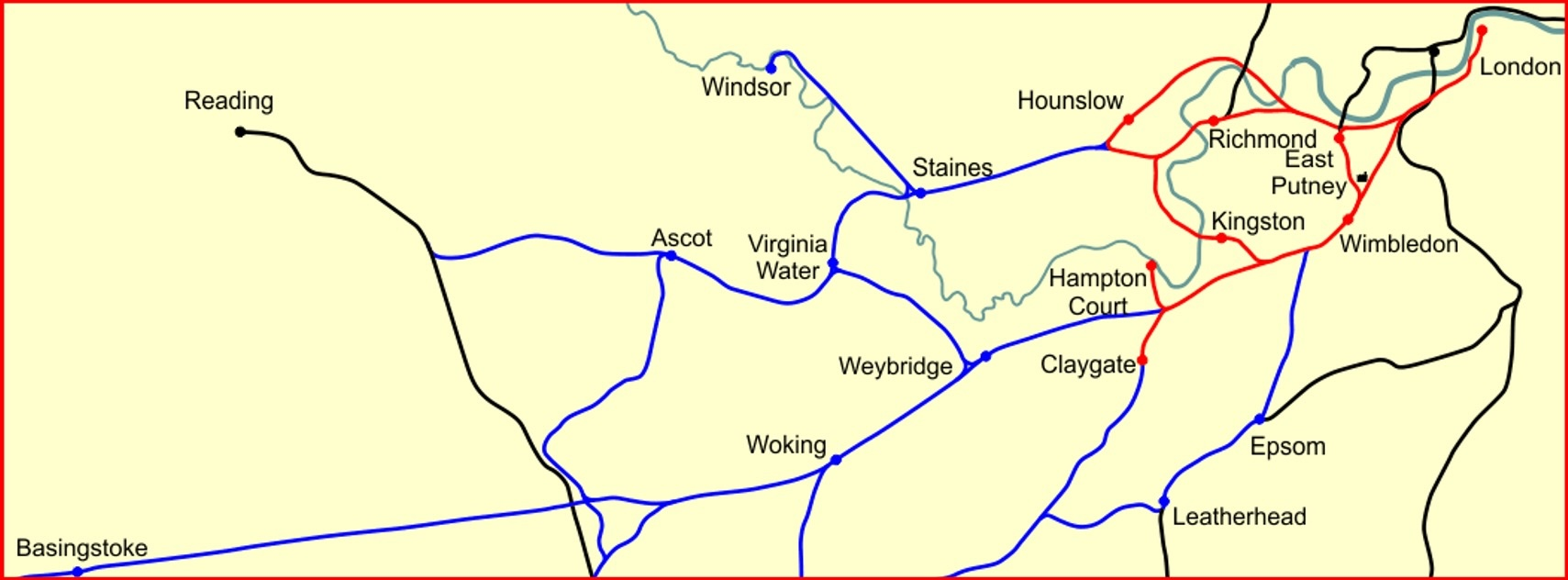
The electrified (red) and unelectrified (blue) lines of the LSWR at the end of 1916

Over the course of the next six years, passenger numbers on the LSWR declined by 1 1/4 million and, in 1912, the company estimated that its annual income would have been around £100,000 higher, had its suburban lines been electrified. That year, the company authorised the laying of the third rail along 47 route miles (76 km), and the first electric trains operated in public service to Shepperton on 30 January 1916, running along the South West Main Line between Waterloo and New Malden Junction. Electricity was supplied from a 25 MW railway power station at Durnsford Road, Wimbledon, completed in 1915.

The third rail was extended to Hampton Court Junction, where a flyover was constructed, and electric trains began running to Hampton Court and to Claygate on 18 June and 20 November 1916 respectively. As part of the works, platforms 1–6 and 16 were electrified at Waterloo, and substations were installed at Waterloo, Clapham Junction and Raynes Park. The total cost of the first phase of LSWR suburban electrification, including both infrastructure and rolling stock, was £1.37 million (equivalent to £102.66 million in 2025). As a result of the project, passenger numbers on the LSWR grew from 23.3 million in 1915 to 29 million in 1916, and to 33 million in 1917.

The Surrey section, about half of which has become Greater London, was electrified as far west as Pirbright Junction (for Alton) before World War II. It was completed, using the 750 V DC third-rail system, by the London & South Western Railway or the Southern Railway, its successor.

Electrification of the South West Main Line between Sturt Lane (near Frimley) and Bournemouth was authorised in September 1964. Installation of overhead lines was considered, but British Rail instead decided to use the third-rail system which was considered to have a lower upfront cost. An electrical feed from the National Grid was installed at Basingstoke, with power distributed via a network of 19 substations. The project included the replacement of jointed track with continuous welded rail. Regular electric trains from London began operating in public service to Basingstoke on 2 January 1967 and to Bournemouth on 10 July 1967. The final steam-hauled public service between Waterloo and Southampton ran on 8 July 1967. In the same month, the locomotive shed at Nine Elms – the last main-line steam shed in England – was closed.

Rolling stock constructed or modified and rebuilt under the 1967 electrification project consisted of:

- 11 4-Rep 4-car powered tractor electric multiple unit (EMU)
- 28 4-TC 4-car unpowered multiple units
- 3 3-TC 3-car unpowered trailer multiple units
- 4 spare trailer coaches
- 20 4-Vep EMUs
- 10 HB Class 74 electro-diesel locomotives
- 19 KB Class 33/1 diesel-electric locomotives
- 4 Class 12 diesel shunters
- 3 three-car de-icing EMUs

The 4-Rep tractor units' 3001–3011 motor coaches were newly built, as were the complete 4-Vep units 7701–7720, but the 4-Rep trailer coaches and all cars in the 4-TC and 3-TC sets 401–428 and 301–303 were conversions from locomotive-hauled stock; the four spare trailer coaches were two RU, one BFK and one DTSO. It was planned originally that a 3-car single-ended push-pull trailer set formed DTC+BFK+RU would work with a Class 74 to cover 4-Rep heavy maintenance, but this formation never operated and was replaced by the 8-Vab unit 8001; the three cars remained as spares. The other RU was deployed on special trains with TC units when needed.

Class 74 were heavy rebuilds of Class 71 electric locomotives; Class 33/1 were a push-pull modification of 33/0. The Class 12 shunters were air brake fitted and intended as depot shunters and station pilots. The de-icing units were formed of three pairs of 2-Hal and 4-Lav EMU motor coaches coupled back to back and adapted for electro-pneumatic brakes. In later days, there were several changes to allocations and formations.

From then until 1988, trains on the Bournemouth to Weymouth section operated a push-pull system. One or two 4-TC units would be propelled from London to Bournemouth by a 4-REP unit, controlled from the leading cab of the former. At Bournemouth, one or both of the 4-TCs would continue over the non-electric line to Weymouth, hauled by a Class 33/1 diesel locomotive. Trains from Weymouth would follow the same procedure in reverse.

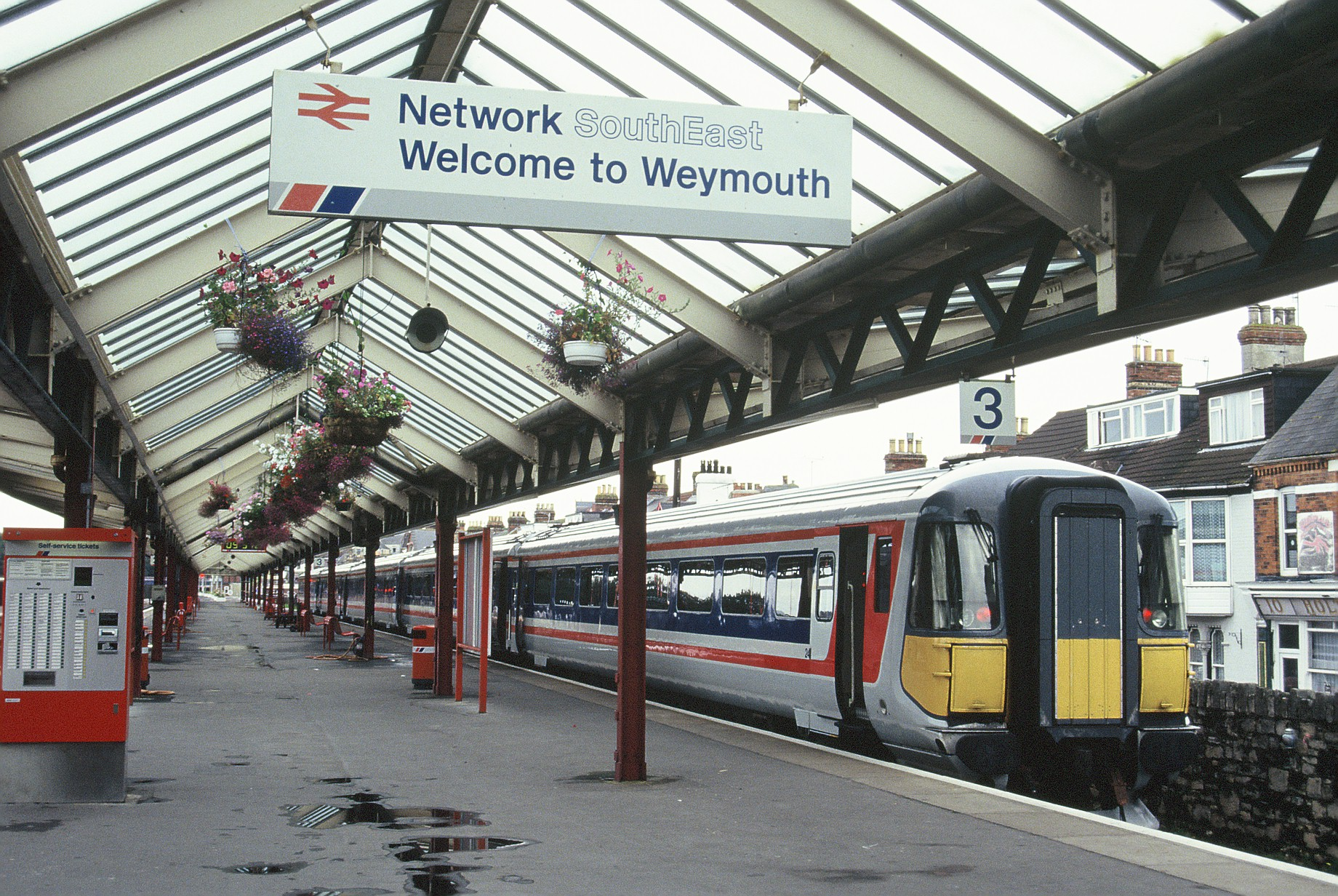
A Class 442 unit in Network SouthEast livery at Weymouth station

Electrification of the South West Main Line between Bournemouth and Weymouth was authorised in January 1986, and work on the £53 million project (£158 million in 2025) began in October that year. To reduce costs, a 5 mi (8.0 km) stretch of line was singled between Moreton and Dorchester South, and the capacity of the 11 kV supply from the National Grid limited train lengths to a maximum of five coaches. (Note: An 11 kV electrical feeder from the National Grid was installed at Poole, instead of the more usual 33 kV.) The third rail was energised on 11 January 1988, and public electric services began on 16 May that year. The Class 442 units, ordered as part of the project, reduced the journey time between Waterloo and Weymouth by 25 minutes.

Class 444 and Class 450 trains were introduced between 2004 and 2006.

== Services ==
The majority of passenger services are currently operated by South Western Railway. CrossCountry operates the Bournemouth – Manchester services travelling on the line between Bournemouth and Basingstoke.

In addition, Great Western Railway and Southern operate services at Southampton Central, which use a section of South West Main Line to access Southampton.

In more detail, London Waterloo – Weymouth services run twice an hour on the whole length of the line, and other intercity services which run on a significant portion of the line include:

- London Waterloo – Portsmouth Harbour (via Eastleigh) services, branching off at Eastleigh as an indirect service
- London Waterloo – Salisbury and Exeter St Davids services, branching off at Basingstoke
- London Waterloo – Portsmouth services, branching off at Woking
- Bournemouth – Manchester CrossCountry services, branching off at Basingstoke for the Reading to Basingstoke Line to Reading

Many other services from London Waterloo also run on a section of the line, except those using the Waterloo–Reading line in the direction of Richmond.

== Future development ==
In July 2011, Network Rail in its London & South East Route Utilisation Strategy (RUS) recommended adding a fifth track to the four-track stretch of line between Clapham Junction and Surbiton. This was found to be feasible within the existing land (rail corridor), and was seen as the most practicable way of providing more capacity on the route. It would permit up to eight additional trains to run in the peak hour, for a maximum of 32 trains in this stretch. The scheme would also entail more flexible track use, modifying one Windsor Line track to permit use by mainline trains. Options rejected in the RUS as not viable included double-deck trains, building a flyover at Woking, and introducing 12- or 16-car trains.

== Major accidents and incidents ==
Memorial to those killed in the Clapham Junction rail crash

- 2 Apr 1842: Wallers Ash Tunnel, between Micheldever and Winchester, collapsed. Four maintenance workers, who had been attempting to shore up the tunnel roof, were killed.
- 11 September 1880: A locomotive waiting to access Nine Elms depot was struck by a passenger train south of Vauxhall station due to a signaller's error. Seven people were killed.
- 25 May 1933: A derailed passenger train at Raynes Park was struck by a passing train on the adjacent track. Five people were killed.
- 26 November 1947: A passenger train ran into the back of a second train that had stopped at a red signal at Cove near Farnborough. Two people were killed.
- 12 December 1988, Clapham Junction rail crash: A passenger train ran into the rear of a second train south of Clapham Junction, after faulty wiring caused a signal to display an incorrect proceed aspect. A third train collided with the wreckage. The accident occurred shortly after 8 am on a weekday morning and 35 people were killed.

== Listed buildings and structures ==
=== Stations ===
There are seven Grade II-listed stations on the South West Main Line:

Name	Location	Type	Completed (Note: The date given is the date used by Historic England as significant for the initial building or that of an important part in the structure's description.)	Date designated	Grid ref. (Note: The grid reference is based on the British national grid reference system, sometimes known as OSGB36, used by the Ordnance Survey.) Geo-coordinates	Entry number (Note: The "List Entry Number" is a unique number assigned to each listed building and scheduled monument by Historic England.)	Image
Waterloo station (Victory Arch)	London Borough of Lambeth	station (part)	1922	8 March 2002	TQ31018000	1063898	Waterloo station (Victory Arch) More images
Surbiton station	Royal Borough of Kingston upon Thames	station	1937	6 October 1983	TQ18086731	1185071	Surbiton station More images
Micheldever station	City of Winchester, Hampshire	station	c. 1840	16 November 1983	SU51774283	1303261	Micheldever station More images
Eastleigh station	Eastleigh, Hampshire	station	1840	14 February 1983	SU45731907	1281411	Eastleigh station More images
Swaythling station	Southampton	station	1883	8 October 1981	SU43921593	1179348	Swaythling station
Bournemouth station	Bournemouth	station	1885	1 August 1974	SZ09679199	1324706	Bournemouth station More images
Wareham station	Dorset	station	1886	8 April 1976	SY91968816	1119995	Wareham station More images

=== Other buildings and structures ===
Other listed buildings and structures associated with the South West Main Line include (all Grade II-listed):

Name	Location	Type	Completed	Date designated	Grid ref. Geo-coordinates	Entry number	Image
Woking signal box	Woking, Surrey	signal box	1930s	25 October 1990	TQ00575864	1236967	Woking signal box More images
Drummond House	St Denys, Southampton	former station building	1867	8 October 1981	SU43091378	1092028	Drummond House
Railway bridge over River Piddle	Wareham, Dorset	bridge	1847	8 April 1976	SY91288760	1153638	Railway bridge over River Piddle
Wareham Bridge	Dorchester, Dorset	bridge	c. 1847	8 May 1975	SY70159006	1324409	Wareham Bridge More images

== Bibliography ==
- Baker, Michael (1987). The Waterloo to Weymouth Line. Wellingborough: Stephens. ISBN 978-0-85-059835-3.
- Brown, David (2009). Development of the London Suburban Network and Its Trains. Southern Electric. Vol. 1. Crowthorne: Capital Transport. ISBN 978-1-85-414330-3.
- Brown, David; Jackson, Alan A. (1990). Network SouthEast Handbook. Harrow Weald: Capital Transport. ISBN 978-1-85-414129-3.
- Clarke, John M. (2006). The Brookwood Necropolis Railway. Locomotion Papers. Vol. 143 (4th ed.). Usk: The Oakwood Press. ISBN 978-0-85-361655-9.
- Cooper, B.K.; Antell, Robert (1988). A Tribute to the London & South Western Railway. London: Ian Allan. ISBN 978-0-71-101780-1.
- Faulkner, J.N.; Williams, R.A. (1988). The LSWR in the 20th Century. Newton Abbot: David & Charles. ISBN 978-0-71-538927-0.
- Glover, John (2001). Southern Electric. Hersham: Ian Allan Ltd. ISBN 978-0-71-102807-4.
- Green, Chris; Vincent, Mike (2014). The Network SouthEast story. Hersham: Ian Allan. ISBN 978-0-86-093653-4.
- Jackson, Alan A. (1999). The Railway in Surrey. Penryn: Atlantic Transport Publishers. ISBN 978-0-90-689990-8.
- Jackson, Allen (2017). Signalling and Signal Boxes along the LSWR Routes. Stroud: Amberley Publishing. ISBN 978-1-44-566938-0.
- Karau, Paul; Parsons, Mike; Robertson, Paul (1984). The Didcot, Newbury and Southampton Railway. Upper Bucklebury: Wild Swan. ISBN 978-0-90-686704-4.
- Maggs, Colin (2015) [2013]. A History of the Great Western Railway. Stroud: Amberley Publishing. ISBN 978-1-44-564428-8.
- Mitchell, Vic; Smith, Keith (1986). Waterloo to Woking. Midhurst: Middleton Press. ISBN 978-0-90-652038-3.
- Mitchell, Vic; Smith, Keith (1987). Southampton to Bournemouth. Midhurst: Middleton Press. ISBN 978-0-90-652042-0.
- Mitchell, Vic; Smith, Keith (1988a). Woking to Southampton. Midhurst: Middleton Press. ISBN 978-0-90-652055-0.
- Mitchell, Vic; Smith, Keith (1988b). Bournemouth to Weymouth. Midhurst: Middleton Press. ISBN 978-0-90-652057-4.
- Nock, O.S. (1971) [1966]. The London & South Western Railway. London: Ian Allan. ISBN 978-0-71-100267-8.
- Oppitz, Leslie (1989). Dorset Railways Remembered. Newbury: Countryside Books. ISBN 978-1-85-306042-7.
- Robertson, Kevin (2008). Southern Scene. Hersham: Ian Allan. ISBN 978-0-71-103339-9.
- Welch, Michael (2003). A Southern Electric Album. Crowthorne: Capital Transport. ISBN 978-1-85-414270-2.
- White, H.P. (1992). Southern England. A Regional History of the Railways of Great Britain. Vol. II (5th ed.). ISBN 978-0-94-653777-8.
- Williams, R. A. (1968). The London & South Western Railway. Vol. 1: The Formative Years. Newton Abbot: David & Charles. ISBN 0-7153-4188-X.
- Williams, R. A. (1973). The London & South Western Railway. Vol. 2: Growth and Consolidation. Newton Abbot: David & Charles. ISBN 0-7153-5940-1.
