= Bournemouth East railway station (1870–1885) =

Disused railway station in Dorset, England

Coordinates: 50.7269°N 1.8603°W

Bournemouth East

General information
- Location: Bournemouth, Dorset; England
- Platforms: 1

Other information
- Status: Disused

History
- Original company: Ringwood, Christchurch and Bournemouth Railway
- Pre-grouping: London and South Western Railway

Key dates
- 14 March 1870: Opened
- 20 July 1885: Closed
Location

Bournemouth East was the first railway station to be built in Bournemouth, Dorset, England. Completed in March 1870, it was sited at the south-east side of the Holdenhurst Road bridge, opposite the current station, at the end of an extension of an existing branch from Ringwood to Christchurch which had originally opened on 13 November 1862. The facilities offered by this station were very basic and not befitting a wealthy town which by 1871 had reached 5,900 inhabitants. The second station in the town, Bournemouth West, opened on 20 July 1874, and it was a far more substantial affair at the end of a new branch from Poole.

It was closed and replaced by the new Bournemouth East station, on the opposite (north-west) side of the Holdenhurst Road bridge, on 20 July 1885.

== The site today ==
The site is used for a warehouse store.

Preceding station	Disused railways	Following station
Christchurch; Line and station closed	London and South Western Railway; Ringwood, Christchurch and Bournemouth Railway	Terminus
