= Ringwood, Christchurch and Bournemouth Railway =

Former railway company in England

The Ringwood, Christchurch and Bournemouth Railway (RC&BR) was a railway company formed to link Christchurch and Bournemouth, England, to the London and South Western Railway's Southampton and Dorchester line at Ringwood. The RC&BR opened in 1862 from Christchurch to Ringwood, and was extended to Bournemouth in 1870, sharing in the growing popularity of the town. However the route was circuitous, and the London and South Western Railway opened a shorter route between Brockenhurst and Christchurch via Sway in 1888, making the Ringwood to Christchurch section a branch line.

A feature of the line was that a landowner had the right to stop any train at a private station, a fact that became an embarrassment when express trains started to operate.

The section from Ringwood to Christchurch closed in 1935, but the Christchurch to Bournemouth section remains as part of the South West Main Line.

== Origins ==
The London and South Western Railway (LSWR) reached Southampton in 1840, and independent interests promoted the Southampton and Dorchester Railway to connect Dorchester to London. The line was built, opening in 1847, but its route took it on a northerly alignment from Brockenhurst through Ringwood and Wimborne. The line was leased to, and worked by the LSWR, and later absorbed by it. Bournemouth was not an important settlement at the time, and was left some distance from the line; it had a population in 1851 of only 1,330. There was a branch serving Poole, but that was located on the south side of the Holes Bay inlet.

In the following decade, Bournemouth grew in importance and it became desirable to provide a railway connection. After a failed attempt, local interests promoted the Ringwood, Christchurch and Bournemouth Railway, a 7 3/4-mile (12.5 km) line from the northern margin of Christchurch to the Southampton and Dorchester line near Ringwood. As originally designed, the junction there would have faced west, towards Wimborne. The route followed the valley of the River Avon. The engineer was Captain William Moorsom.

Ringwood, Christchurch and Bournemouth Railway Act 1859
- Act of Parliament
- Parliament of the United Kingdom
- Long title: An Act for making a Railway from the London and South-western Railway in the Parish of Ringwood to Christchurch, and an Approach Road at Christchurch, all in the County of Southampton; and for other Purposes.
- Citation: 22 & 23 Vict. c. xcv

Dates
- Royal assent: 8 August 1859

Early LSWR opposition having been withdrawn, the railway obtained its authorising act of Parliament, the Ringwood, Christchurch and Bournemouth Railway Act 1859 (22 & 23 Vict. c. xcv), on 8 August 1859, with capital of £45,000. The contractor was Thomas Brassey and the line was quickly constructed; the west facing junction at Ringwood was changed to face towards Southampton, the new line running alongside the double track of the Southampton and Dorchester line for some distance, joining it at Ringwood station. It was a single line, with sharp curves and difficult gradients.

== First opening ==
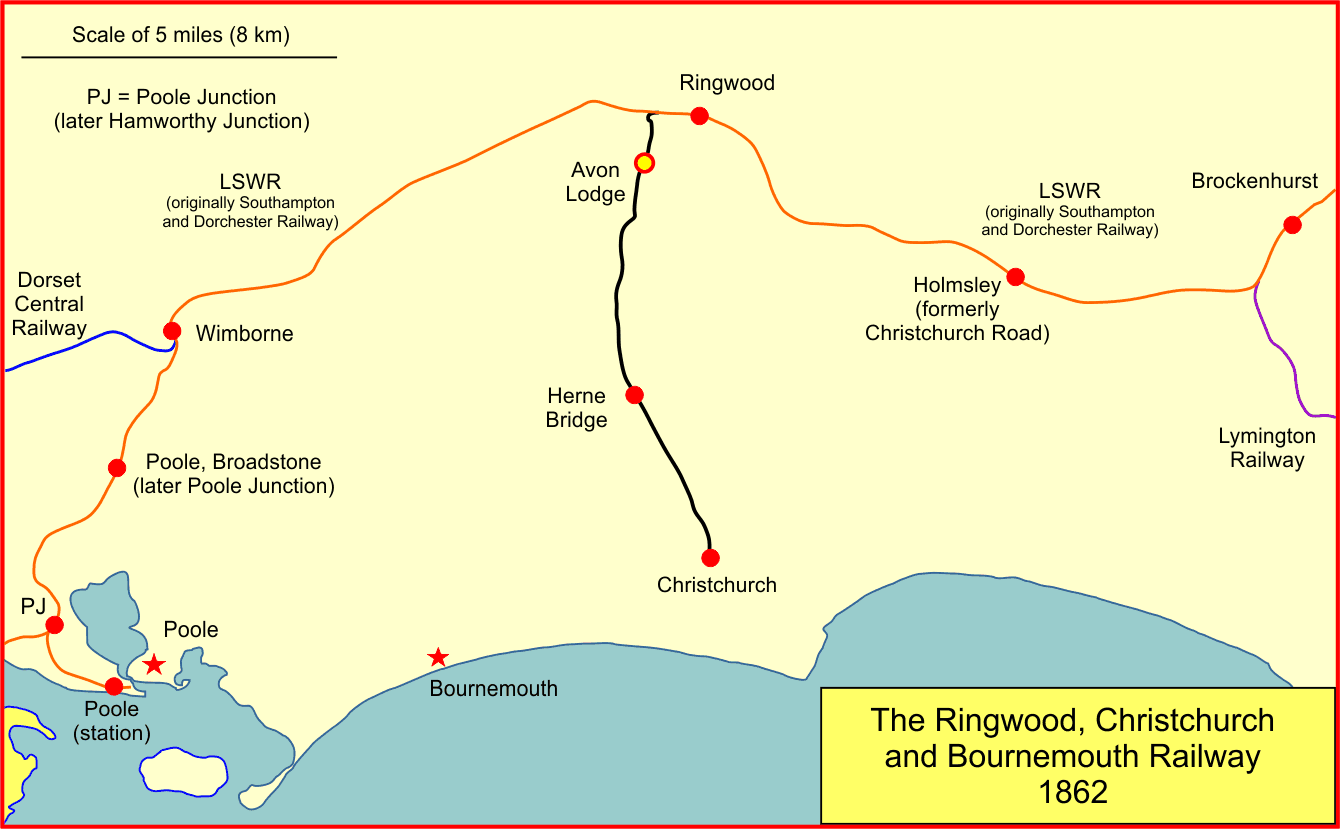
The Ringwood Christchurch and Bournemouth Railway in 1862

The line opened on 13 November 1862; it was worked by the LSWR.

There was one intermediate station at Hurn and a private halt at Avon Lodge. The latter was located on the private road to Avon Castle; the site is on Avon Castle Drive near the Junction with Windmill Lane. (Note: Butt gives the opening of Avon Lodge as 3 November 1862, but this must be a mistake for 13 November.)

== Extension to Bournemouth ==
Ringwood, Christchurch and Bournemouth Railway Act 1863
- Act of Parliament
- Parliament of the United Kingdom
- Long title: An Act to empower the Ringwood, Christchurch, and Bournemouth Railway Company to extend their Railway to Bournemouth; and for other Purposes.
- Citation: 26 & 27 Vict. c. cxxxiv

Dates
- Royal assent: 13 July 1863

Text of statute as originally enacted

Connecting Christchurch to the main line network was only a first step, and income from the line was very poor. Undaunted by the poor response to calls on shares, (Note: Subscribers to shares in new railway companies usually only paid a small proportion of the face value as a deposit, and subsequently there were "calls" for incremental payments as construction work proceeded. If a company was offered for subscription in optimistic times and money later became scarce, many subscribers were unwilling, or unable, to respond to the calls.) the company took powers by the Ringwood, Christchurch and Bournemouth Railway Act 1863 (26 & 27 Vict. c. cxxxiv) of 13 July 1863 to raise an additional £30,000 and extend the line 3 1/2-mile (5.6 km) to the east side of Holdenhurst Road in Bournemouth; the present-day Bournemouth station is on the west of that road. The location was criticised by a local newspaper as being too far from the town centre.

On 14 March 1870 the line opened throughout, with the LSWR working the entire line for half the gross receipts. There were five trains a day at first, taking about 35 minutes for the journey to and from Ringwood, making intermediate calls at Hurn and Christchurch. This immediately brought considerable passenger traffic to the line and revived its financial state; through carriages between Bournemouth and London were arranged from 1 March 1872, detached at Ringwood from Weymouth Trains, and the little company was able to pay dividends.

With its difficult gradients—there was a 1 in 99 (1%) gradient rising from Christchurch to Bournemouth — and curves, and a 25 miles per hour (40 km/h) speed limit, the line was now on the main route from London to Bournemouth.

=== Avon Lodge station ===
The private station at Avon Lodge was the result of a clause inserted into the company's authorising act; Williams says that the Ringwood, Christchurch and Bournemouth Railway Act 1859 (22 & 23 Vict. c. xcv) had required the company to keep a "lodge" where the line crossed the road at the entrance to Avon Cottage, and the owner or occupier had a perpetual right to exhibit a red flag by day and a red lamp by night against any 'ordinary train', which was required to stop. When express trains started operating on the line this became objectionable to the company, and a lawsuit followed; the judgment allowed the company to refuse to stop express trains.

Evidently Avon Cottage was a considerable property: the census of 1871 calls Avon Cottage an "estate". The third Earl of Malmesbury owned it at the time of the authorisation of the line, but he sold it in 1863 and it was the purchaser's grandson who pressed the issue.

The situation was described in The Railway Magazine:

On the London and South-Western Railway's line, between Ringwood and Christchurch, there is a private station worth notice. It is about a mile and a half from Ringwood, and is on the estate of Avon Castle, which place is now a private residence, tenanted and owned by Colonel Ralph Peacock.

When the line in question was constructed the property here was owned by the late Turner Turner, Esq., and by arrangement with him certain private rights and privileges were allowed to exist by the railway company, which have obtained until to-day, and still continue. The proprietor of Avon Lodge Station has the sole right of using it either for passenger traffic or goods. The "general staff" consists of one man all told—and this man is station-master, signalman, booking-clerk, porter, etc., combined. This station is absolutely a "private" one...

There is one small room on the platform which does duty as booking-hall, waiting-room, and station master's office, besides serving for a luggage bureau, etc. If any passenger, not being a guest or visitor to Avon Castle, however, wishes to alight at this interesting station, Col. Peacock does not usually raise any objection, and such passenger can generally have his wish gratified by informing the guard, who will specially stop the train at the platform.

== Sale to the London and South Western Railway ==
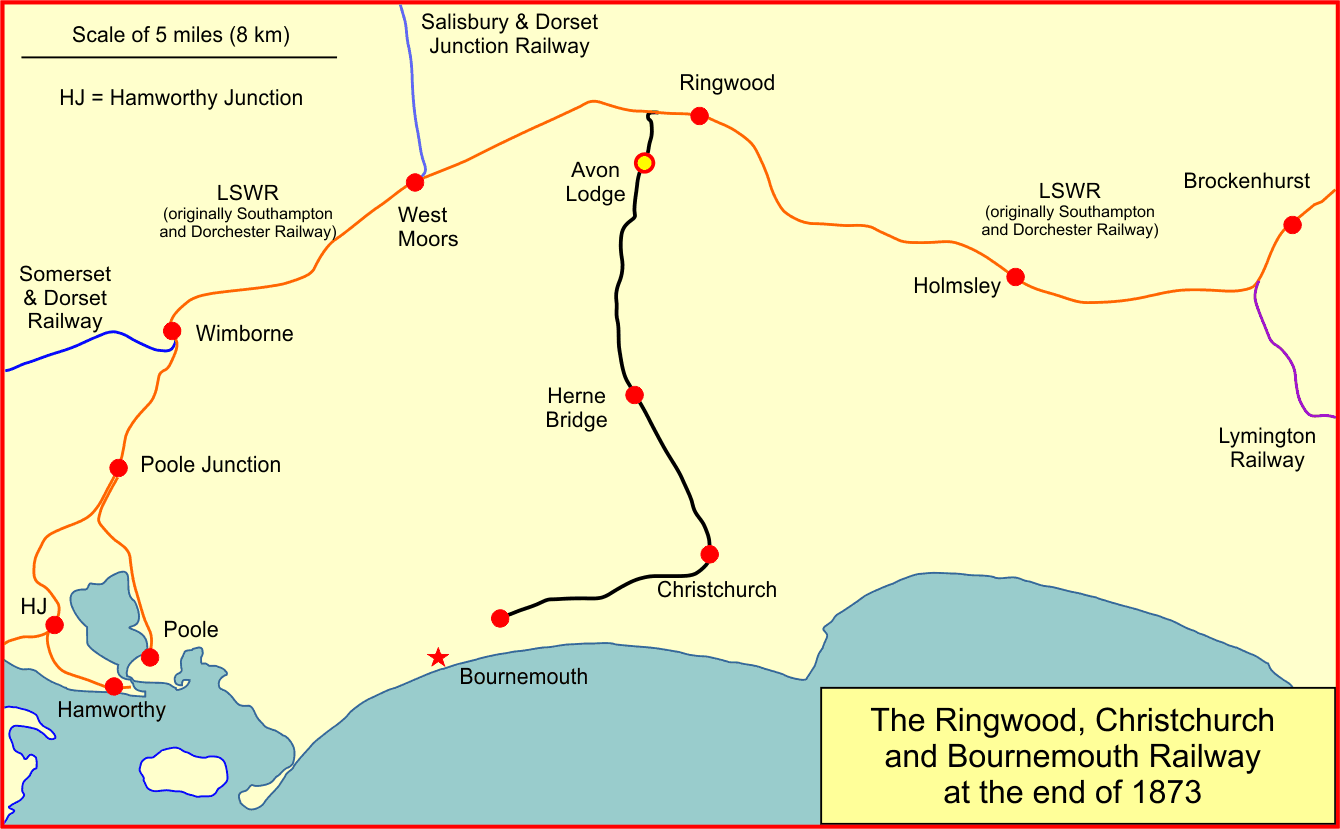
The Ringwood Christchurch and Bournemouth Railway immediately before purchase by the LSWR.

On 1 January 1874, the Ringwood, Christchurch and Bournemouth Railway was purchased by the LSWR.

== Improvements to the route to Bournemouth ==
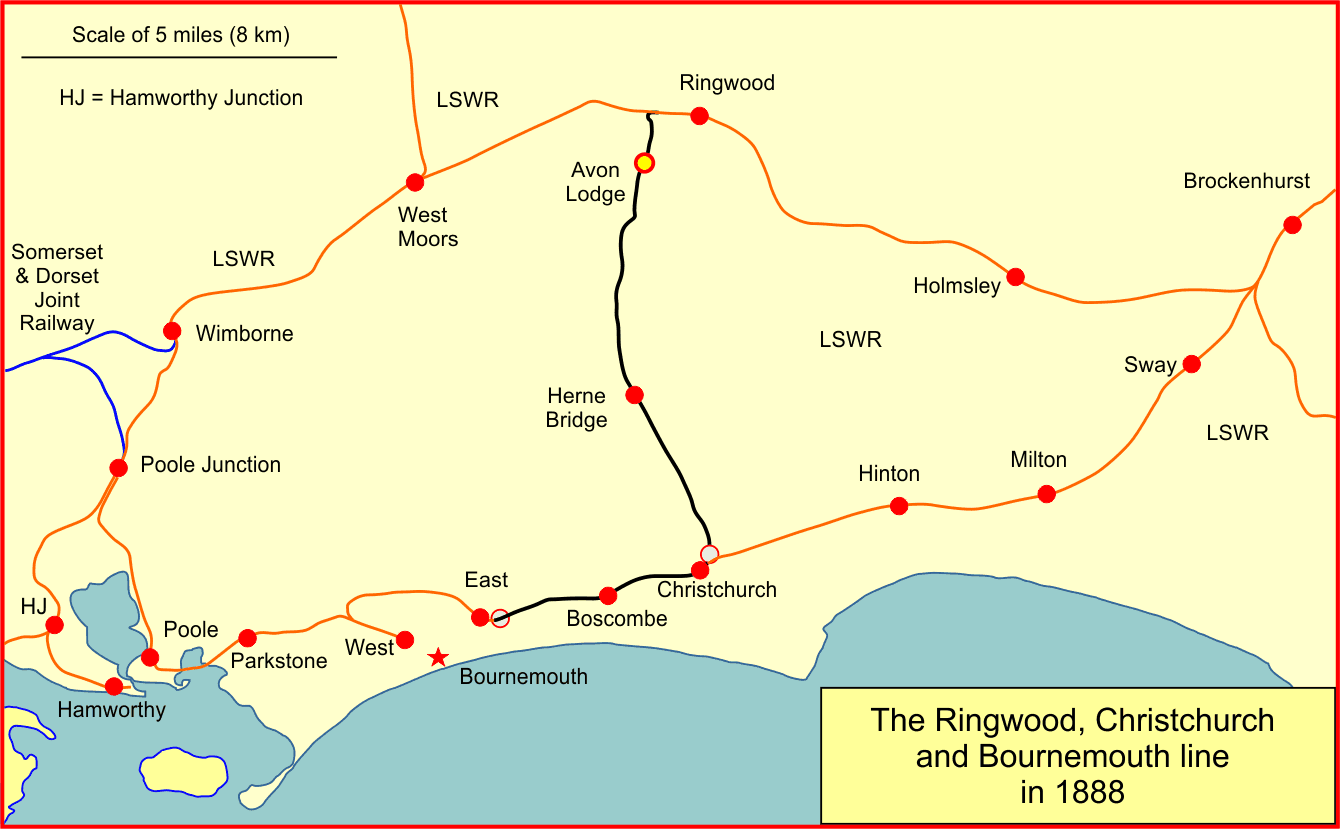
The Ringwood Christchurch and Bournemouth line in 1888

As Bournemouth grew in importance the frustration of the route deviating by way of Ringwood, and the slow progress on the route, became objectionable. Doubling the line was considered, but a new direct line from Brockenhurst to Christchurch, and doubling the line from there to Bournemouth, were obviously a better option. The Bournemouth station would be reconstructed west of Holdenhurst Road (actually the present location of Bournemouth station) and a new, spacious central station off Branksome Wood Road would be built. A Poole branch from Broadstone, entering from the west, had opened in 1872, and the new line was to connect with it. In fact the new construction was limited to the new line from Lymington Junction, a little west of Brockenhurst, to the Bournemouth station at Holdenhurst Road, which for the time being was a terminus.

The new Bournemouth station opened on 20 July 1885, and on 30 May 1886 the Christchurch to Bournemouth section was doubled, and a new station at Christchurch was opened, in preparation for the new route: the original station there was immediately east of Bargate and inconveniently aligned for the new route. On 1 July 1886 a Boscombe station was opened. A series of difficulties with the construction process meant that it was not until 5 March 1888 that the new line from Lymington Junction—usually referred to as the Sway line—opened, concurrently with the connecting line from the Bournemouth ("East") station to the West station.

== From 1888 until 1935 ==
From 1888 the London to Bournemouth route passed over the new Sway line to Christchurch and thence over the Ringwood, Christchurch and Bournemouth line to the site of the original Bournemouth station; from there the trains ran to the West station, which was a terminus. Weymouth and Bournemouth trains divided at Brockenhurst, the Weymouth portion continuing over the original Southampton and Dorchester route, and the Bournemouth portion over the new line. Trains from Bournemouth West towards Dorchester required to reverse direction at Poole Junction, later called Broadstone. It was not until 1893 that a direct route across Holes Bay was constructed. Meanwhile, the original section between Ringwood and Christchurch became a minor rural branch.

== Chronology of stations ==
- Ringwood station was on the Southampton and Dorchester line; it was provided with a covered bay platform for the Christchurch line.
- Avon Lodge has been referred to above, and was open throughout the life of the Ringwood to Christchurch section. A private siding was provided.
- Herne (renamed Hurn on 9 June 1897) (Note: Butt says that the station opened, with the line, as Herne Bridge, and was renamed Herne in 1888. Some writers spell this Hearne.) The station had a passing loop until 9 August 1929.
- Christchurch; the original station was relocated a little to the west to conform to the alignment of the new Sway line; this change took effect on 30 May 1886, although the Sway line did not open until later.
- Boscombe station opened on 1 July 1886. It was renamed Pokesdown (Boscombe) in 1891, and renamed again simply Pokesdown from 1 June 1897. In 1930 it was relocated a little to the west of the original, which then closed. The new station was provided with quadruple tracks, with platforms on the outer tracks only.
- Boscombe (second) station opened on 1 June 1897. It closed to passengers on 4 October 1967.
- Bournemouth station opened on 14 March 1870. This first Bournemouth station was a simple affair, with a single platform and run-round, and a goods shed and a second siding.

When the Bournemouth West station opened on 15 June 1874, the RC&BR station was renamed "Bournemouth East".

- Bournemouth East (second station). Opened by the LSWR on 20 July 1885, when the original RC&BR station was reduced to goods station status.

The Disused Stations website has photographs and further descriptive material for closed stations; see Avon Lodge at and Hurn at

== Closure north of Christchurch ==
The line between Ringwood and Christchurch declined in use, and the Southern Railway closed it on and from Monday 30 September 1935, the last service train running on the previous Saturday, 28 September. However according to the Southern Railway Magazine a special train of two camping coaches, with passengers, worked between Hurn and Christchurch on Saturday 5 October 1935.

== Since 1935 ==
The Christchurch to Bournemouth section remains open as part of the South West Main Line. British Railways electrified it with direct current third rail on 10 July 1967.
