= South East Dorset conurbation =

Population centre in Southern England

Coordinates: 50.72°N 1.87°W

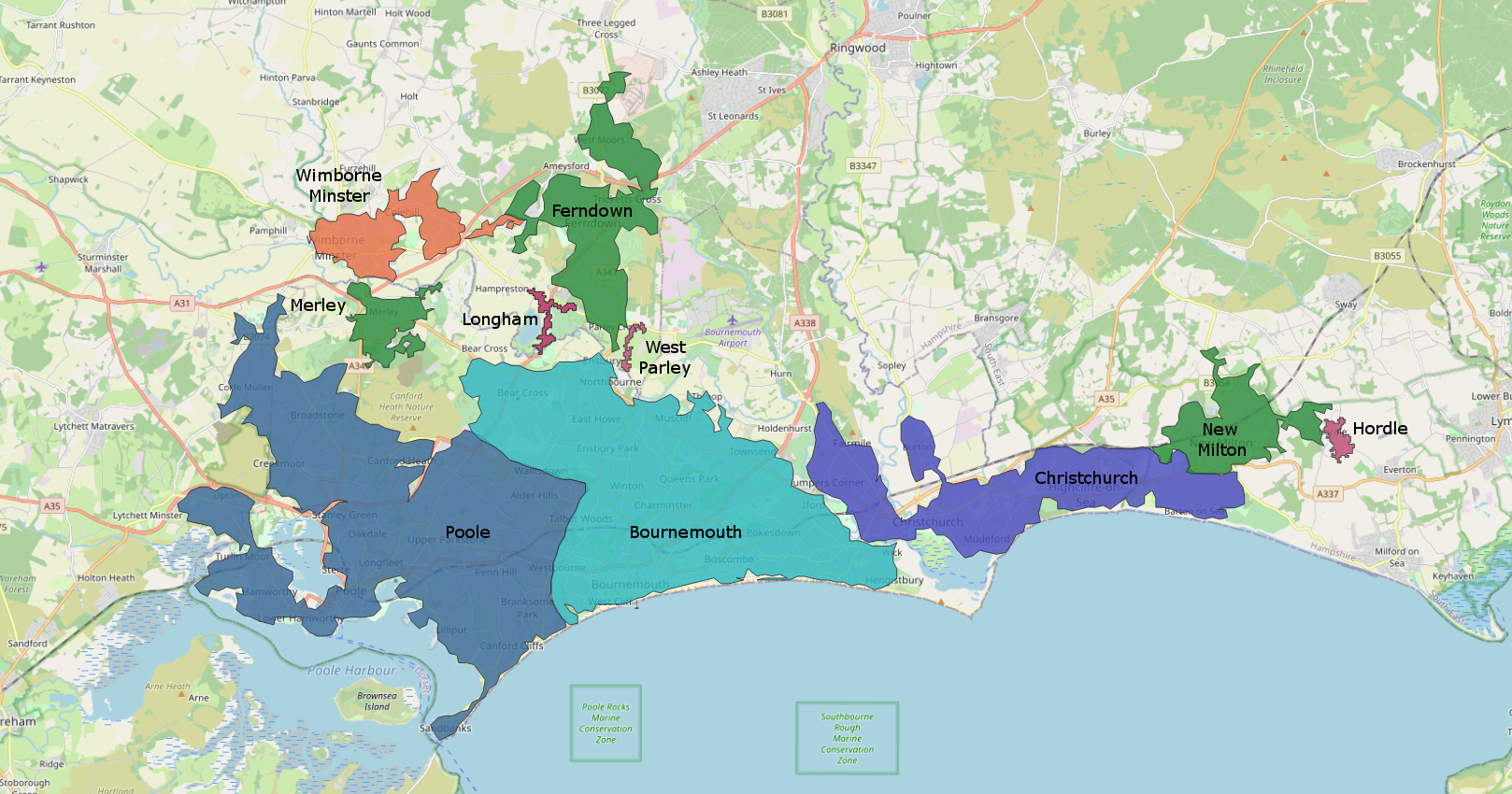
Map of the Bournemouth/Poole built-up area, showing subdivisions

The South East Dorset conurbation (also known as the South Dorset conurbation, Poole-Bournemouth urban area and Bournemouth urban area) is a multi-centred conurbation on the south coast of Dorset in England.

== Extent ==
The main population centres are Bournemouth, Christchurch, and Poole which are served by the single unitary authority of Bournemouth, Christchurch and Poole. However, the urbanised area spreads into the area of the Dorset unitary authority and into the New Forest District as far east as Barton on Sea. There are a number of satellite towns peripheral to the urban centres, including (listed clockwise) Wareham, Verwood, and Ringwood (Hampshire). The urban area is generally surrounded by a green belt.

In 2006, the South West England Regional Development Agency and the Highways Agency, which maintains England's trunk roads, defined a South East Dorset Conurbation with over 400,000 people. The term has also been applied to the Bournemouth, Christchurch and Poole boroughs, excluding the surrounding towns, for example, in their 2006 Joint Local Transport Plan. The conurbation is the largest urban area in Britain with no part having city status.

== Population ==
The 2011 census gave a population of 466,626 for the conurbation, defined by the Office for National Statistics as the Bournemouth/Poole Built-up Area, and divided it into six main parts: Bournemouth, Ferndown, Wimborne Minster, Christchurch, New Milton, and Poole.

The population of the conurbation increased significantly between the 2001 and 2011 censuses, mainly because the towns of Ferndown and Wimborne Minster became part of it. The population for the conurbation according to the 2001 and 1991 censuses was 383,713 and 358,321, respectively.

== Nearby places ==
There are a number of nearby towns and villages that are separated from the conurbation by narrow gaps. They include:

- Bransgore
- Lytchett Matravers
- Lymington
- Milford on Sea
- Ringwood
- St Ives
- St Leonards
- Verwood
- West Moors

== Transport ==
The conurbation is served by a number of main roads. The M27 motorway feeds the M3 to London and ends on the eastern edge of the New Forest near Southampton, but extends west as the A31 trunk road. The A31 serves as a bypass for the conurbation, north of Poole and Bournemouth but south of many of the satellite towns, and is dual carriageway for most of its length. To the west the A31 merges with the A35 at Bere Regis where they continue west to Dorchester and Exeter. The A35 runs through the centres of the main towns in the conurbation. The A338 is the main arterial route in Bournemouth, running as a dual carriageway from Bournemouth town centre to the A31, and as a single carriageway north to Salisbury. The A350 is Poole town centre's main artery, running north along Holes Bay to the A35, and as a single carriageway to Bath and Bristol. The A337 runs east to Lymington and the New Forest.

The conurbation is served by the South West Main Line which runs from London to Weymouth via Winchester, Southampton and Dorchester. There are stations at New Milton, Hinton Admiral, Christchurch, Pokesdown, Bournemouth, Branksome, Parkstone, Poole, Hamworthy and Holton Heath. The Somerset and Dorset Joint Railway to Bath had its southern terminus here, until its closure in 1966 under the Beeching Axe.

The conurbation's bus services are almost entirely provided by morebus.

The Port of Poole has regular roll-on/roll-off ferry connections to Cherbourg in France, and Gijon and Santander in Spain. High-speed car ferries operate to the Channel Islands, Cherbourg and St. Malo, and a regular all-freight service to the Channel Islands. Bournemouth Airport is about 4 miles (6 km) north of Bournemouth town centre; Ryanair, Jet2 and TUI Airways are the main operators.

== See also ==
- South Hampshire
