= Meyrick Park Halt railway station =

Former railway station in England

Coordinates: 50.7326°N 1.8789°W

Meyrick Park Halt
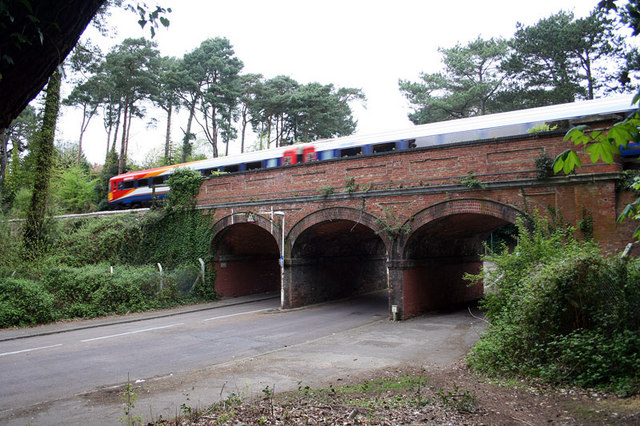
- Station site is to the left of the bridge

General information
- Location: Meyrick Park, Bournemouth, Dorset; England
- Grid reference: SZ086925
- Platforms: 2

Other information
- Status: Disused

History
- Original company: London and South Western Railway

Key dates
- 1 March 1906: Opened
- 1 November 1917: Closed
Location

Meyrick Park Halt was a railway halt located in the Meyrick Park area of Bournemouth, just west of Bournemouth Central railway station in the county of Hampshire (now Dorset) in England. It opened in 1906 as a response to competition from street-running tramways, and served a growing suburb of Bournemouth as well as leisure activities.

== History ==
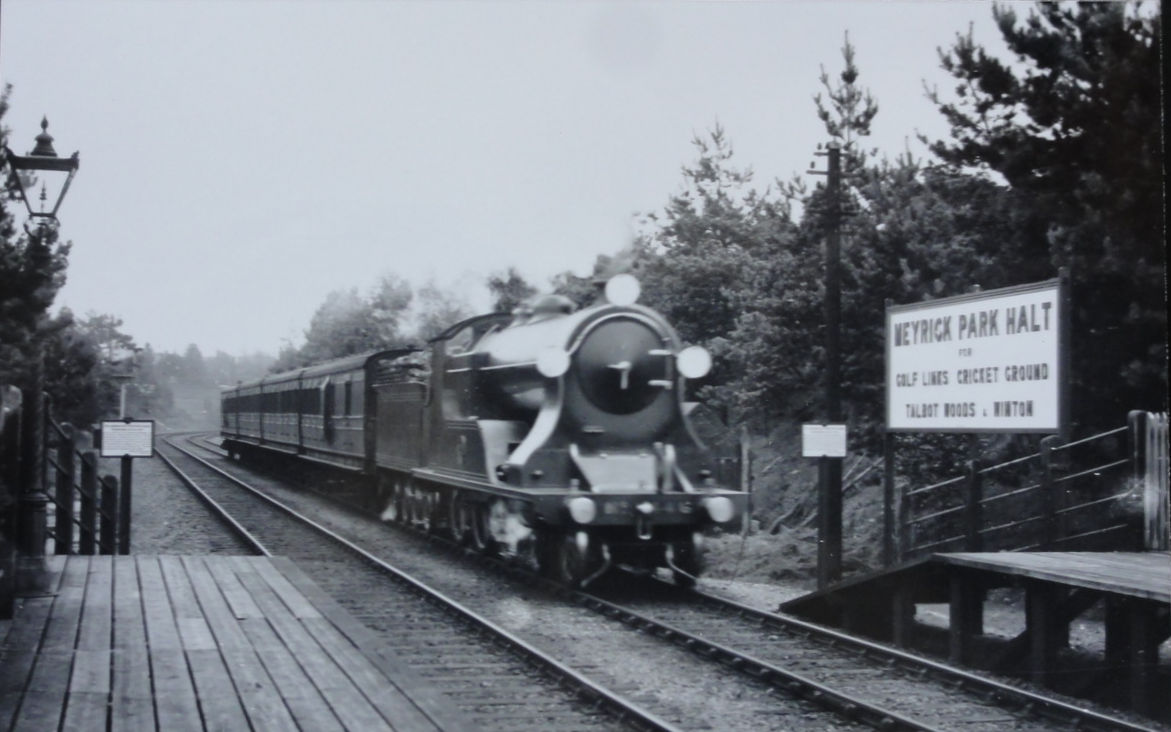
A down train at Meyrick Park Halt

In May 1905, the London and South Western Railway's (LSWR) board approved the expenditure of £167 on the construction of a halt comprising two short wooden platforms and huts in a cutting on the South West Main Line. Situated 55 chains (1.1 km) to the west of Bournemouth Central, the halt lay between the Central and West stations at a point halfway between Gasworks Junction and Central. It was connected to the lower end of Meyrick Park Crescent in Bournemouth by two flights of steps. The new station would serve the expanding suburb of Winton and Meyrick Park, an area of open space where an extensive golf links had been laid out. The decision to provide the halt followed the recommendation of the LSWR's General Manager, Sir Charles Owens, in February 1905 to meet competition by trams in the Bournemouth area by introducing two steam rail motors which would supplement the existing local service. Around ten irregular-interval journeys were to be made between Bournemouth West and Christchurch, with certain services extended to New Milton and Ringwood. The station's opening coincided with the introduction of the service on 1 March 1906.

Trams were already well established in the area which led the Bournemouth Guardian newspaper to comment that, although the new station would be useful to golfers, the residents of Winton would most likely continue using the trams which were perceived as more flexible. Local residents had in fact petitioned the LSWR for a station as early as 1894, but it is thought that even if one had been provided, its patronage would have been mostly lost to the trams in any case. On 17 June 1914, 280 members of the Boscombe Corps of the Salvation Army made the short 1-mile-72-chain (3.1 km) trip from Meyrick Park Halt to Boscombe on the 7:40pm service from Bournemouth West to Christchurch. This was probably the greatest number of people to ever board a train here; the railway company provided a conventional four coach train in place of the usual push-pull train, and a member of staff from Bournemouth Central was stationed at the halt to supervise boarding.

Bradshaw's Guide for 1910 does not show explicit times for train at the halt, but a note in the station bank states: "Halt at Meyrick Park between Bournemouth Central and Bournemouth West". Although many stopping trains in addition to the motor trains passed the location, it is not possible to infer how many made a call at the halt; nor whether trains from Bournemouth Central towards Poole (not Bournemouth West) made calls.

The halt closed on 1 November 1917 as a First World War austerity measure, but was never reopened. The halt was demolished in 1919.

Preceding station	Historical railways	Following station
Bournemouth West; Line partly open, station closed	London and South Western Railway; Southampton and Dorchester Railway	Bournemouth Central; Line and station open
