= PKS =

PKS may refer to:

- Pammal K. Sambandam, a 2002 Tamil language comedy film
- Przedsiębiorstwo Komunikacji Samochodowej, Polish transport organization
- Parkstone railway station, station code
- Phi Kappa Sigma, an international fraternity
- Parkes Catalogue of Radio Sources, an astronomical catalogue
- Polyketide synthases, a family of enzymes
- Prosperous Justice Party (Partai Keadilan Sejahtera), Indonesia
- Serbian Chamber of Commerce
- Pallister–Killian syndrome, a rare genetic disorder
