= Pokesdown railway station =

Railway station in Dorset, England

Coordinates: 50.731°N 1.825°W

Pokesdown
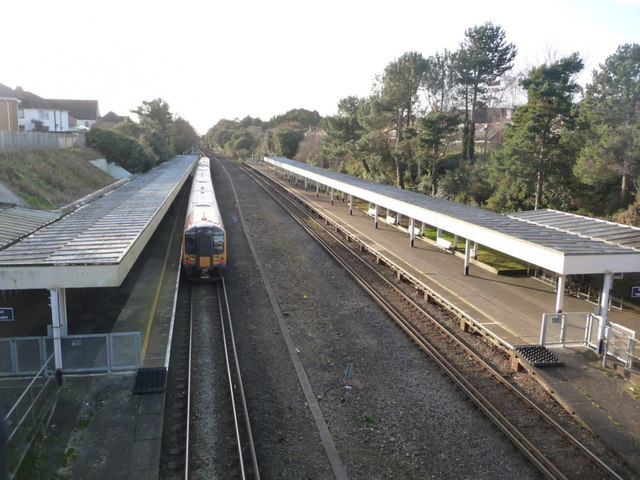
- Pokesdown station platforms looking southwards (towards Bournemouth), 22 February 2014

General information
- Location: Pokesdown, Borough of Bournemouth, Christchurch and Poole; England
- Grid reference: SZ124924
- Manager: South Western Railway
- Platforms: 2

Other information
- Station code: POK
- Classification: DfT category E

History
- Original company: London and South Western Railway
- Pre-grouping: London and South Western Railway
- Post-grouping: Southern Railway

Key dates
- 1 July 1886: Opened as Boscombe
- 1 October 1891: Renamed Pokesdown (Boscombe)
- 1 May 1897: Renamed Pokesdown
- 1930: Renamed Pokesdown for Eastern Bournemouth
- ?: Renamed Pokesdown

Passengers
- 2020/21: ▼96,824
- 2021/22: ▲0.242 million
- 2022/23: ▲0.310 million
- 2023/24: ▲0.338 million
- 2024/25: ▲0.377 million
Location
Notes
- Passenger statistics from the Office of Rail and Road

Pokesdown railway station serves the Pokesdown, Boscombe and Southbourne areas of the town of Bournemouth in Dorset, England. It is on the South West Main Line, 106 miles 24 chains (171.1 km) down the line from London Waterloo.

The station is served by South Western Railway, who operate semi-fast services from London Waterloo to Weymouth and stopping services from London to Poole.

== History ==
The station was opened on 1 July 1886 by the London and South Western Railway. It was originally named Boscombe, which was altered on 1 October 1891 to Pokesdown (Boscombe), since the station was closer to Pokesdown than Boscombe. On 1 May 1897, when Boscombe station was opened, the station was renamed again to just "Pokesdown".

In 1930, the station was again renamed, becoming Pokesdown for Eastern Bournemouth, although it reverted to Pokesdown under British Railways. In the 1930s the Southern Railway made the platform facilities considerably larger, allowing the station to accommodate longer trains. Although some facilities have since been removed, at the time they provided an asset for the non-stopping services because there were tracks to use as fast lines in the up and down direction.

During the 1970s two of the four tracks were removed, and the signal box was closed.

On 16 May 2009 the station signage was changed to Pokesdown for Boscombe with announcements at other stations and on trains changed later on but the station remains officially named Pokesdown. The station is a short bus journey or walk from Boscombe's main shopping area.

Some South Western Railway services operated by two four- or five-carriage electric multiple units coupled together cannot be accommodated fully by the platforms and only selected doors open on such trains. Slightly unusually, platform 2 is longer than platform 1. As such, a double Class 444 can fit 9 carriages on platform 2 but only 7 on platform 1.

== Facilities ==
Lifts are present at Pokesdown station but are now disused albeit with evidence of their former existence still in place. A campaign involving the local MP Tobias Ellwood which began calling for the restoration of lifts at the station appears to have been successful with the winning bidders for the South Western Franchise, South Western Railway, required to install new lifts by 31 December 2019. However, this date has been pushed back to at least September 2020 because of difficulties accessing the disused lift shafts safely. As of April 2023, the lifts still have not been installed. Until lift access is restored, the only means of access to Pokesdown's platforms is via stairs from the bridge. Work to make the station step-free will begin in October 2026. The work should take approximately 18 months.

== Services ==
All passenger trains serving this station are operated by South Western Railway.

As of February 2022, the following services call here in both directions:

- Monday - Friday
  - 1 train per hour on Weymouth - London Waterloo semi-fast service
  - 1 train per hour on Bournemouth - Winchester stopping service
    - these services are join / split at Southampton Central from the fast Weymouth service giving 2 trains per hour for London in peak hours
- Saturday
  - 1 train per hour on Weymouth - London Waterloo semi-fast service
  - 1 train per hour on Poole - Winchester stopping service
- Sunday
  - 1 train per hour on Poole - London Waterloo stopping service
    Preceding station	National Rail	Following station
    Christchurch	South Western Railway; South West Main Line	Bournemouth
    	Historical railways	
    Christchurch	London and South Western Railway; Ringwood, Christchurch and Bournemouth Railway	Boscombe line open, station closed
