= Parkstone railway station =

Railway station in Dorset, England

Coordinates: 50.723°N 1.949°W

Parkstone
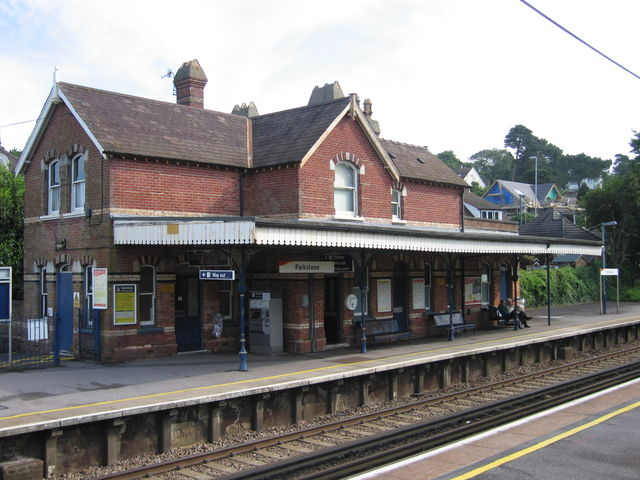

General information
- Location: Parkstone, Bournemouth, Christchurch and Poole; England
- Grid reference: SZ037915
- Managed by: South Western Railway
- Platforms: 2

Other information
- Station code: PKS
- Classification: DfT category E

History
- Pre-grouping: London and South Western Railway
- Post-grouping: Southern Railway

Key dates
- 15 June 1874: Opened
- 1923: Renamed Parkstone for Sandbanks
- 12 May 1980: Renamed Parkstone Dorset

Passengers
- 2020/21: ▼0.040 million
- 2021/22: ▲0.126 million
- 2022/23: ▲0.172 million
- 2023/24: ▲0.200 million
- 2024/25: ▲0.229 million
Location
Notes
- Passenger statistics from the Office of Rail and Road

Parkstone railway station serves the Parkstone area of Poole in Dorset, England.

== History ==
The station opened on 15 June 1874 by the London and South Western Railway (L&SWR). The station was renamed Parkstone for Sandbanks in 1923 and renamed again on 12 May 1980 to Parkstone Dorset. The station had L&SWR services to Waterloo, Weymouth, Salisbury and Bournemouth West.

Additionally it was served by the Somerset and Dorset Joint Railway line from Bath Green Park to Bournemouth West from 1874 until 1966, when the line was closed under the Beeching Axe.

Until 1967, a branch goods line ran from here to the George Jennings South Western Pottery. The line was extended sometime after 1902 from the Pottery to Salterns Pier, on the northern shores of Poole Harbour.

The line between Bournemouth and Weymouth was electrified in 1988, using the standard British Rail Southern Region system of a third rail with 750 volts direct current.

== Operations ==
The station is operated by South Western Railway and is served by both the Weymouth express and the Poole stopping services. It is sited 111 miles 76 chains (180.2 km) down the line from London Waterloo.

The station is able to accommodate trains of up to five coaches; longer trains only open the doors in the first four or five coaches, depending on the type of unit operating the service.

== Services ==
The station is served by South Western Railway.

The typical off-peak stopping pattern of this station, as of June 2021, is below:

- 1 train per hour on Monday-Friday on Poole-London Waterloo express service.
- 2 trains per hour on Saturday, 1 on Weymouth-London Waterloo express service, and 1 on Poole-Winchester stopping service.
- 1 train per hour on Sunday on Weymouth-London Waterloo express service.

Preceding station	National Rail	Following station
Branksome	South Western Railway; South West Main Line	Poole
	Disused railways	
Branksome	Somerset & Dorset Joint Railway; LSWR and Midland Railways	Poole

== Bibliography ==
- Bradshaw, George (1985) [July 1922]. Bradshaw's General Railway and Steam Navigation guide for Great Britain and Ireland: A reprint of the July 1922 issue. Newton Abbot: David & Charles. ISBN 978-0-7153-8708-5. OCLC 12500436.
- Moody, George Thomas (1968). Southern Electric. Allan. ISBN 0-7110-0017-4.
- Quick, Michael (2023) [2001]. Railway passenger stations in Great Britain: a chronology (PDF). version 5.05. Railway & Canal Historical Society.
