= Branksome railway station =

Railway station in Dorset, England

Coordinates: 50.728°N 1.919°W

Branksome
- The station in October 2026

General information
- Location: Poole Road, BH12 1DF; Branksome, Bournemouth, Christchurch and Poole; England
- Grid reference: SZ057919
- Manager: South Western Railway
- Platforms: 2

Other information
- Station code: BSM
- Classification: DfT category E

History
- Pre-grouping: London and South Western Railway
- Post-grouping: Southern Railway

Key dates
- 1 June 1893: Opened

Passengers
- 2020/21: ▼56,690
- 2021/22: ▲0.150 million
- 2022/23: ▲0.202 million
- 2023/24: ▲0.235 million
- 2024/25: ▲0.280 million
Location
Notes
- Passenger statistics from the Office of Rail and Road

Branksome railway station serves the Branksome and Branksome Park areas of Poole in Dorset, England. It is on the South West Main Line near milepost 110 3/4 from London. Opened by the London and South Western Railway in 1893, it is now operated by South Western Railway.

== History ==
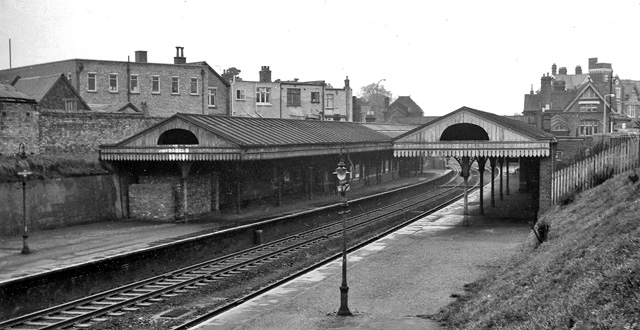
The station in 1963

The London and South Western Railway (LSWR) opened its line from Bournemouth West to Poole in 1874, but the station a Branksome was not opened until 1 June 1893, five years after a direct line had opened from Branksome into Bournemouth. The Somerset and Dorset Joint Railway (S&DJR) opened a locomotive depot at the station in 1895 which operated until closure of the line into Bournemouth West in 1965, after which the S&D trains ran, for the remaining few months of operation, into Bournemouth Central railway station, which had its own locomotive shed.

The line between Bournemouth Central to Branksome and Bournemouth Traction and Rolling Stock Maintenance Depot was electrified in 1967 with the standard British Rail Southern Region system of a third rail with 750 volts direct current to enable electric trains to access the depot (which requires them to reverse at Branksome). The electrification of the route west of Branksome to Weymouth was completed in 1988.

== Description ==
The station has two platforms which are able to accommodate trains of up to five coaches; longer trains only open the doors in the first four or five coaches depending on the type of unit operating the service.

Branksome is 110 miles 51 chains (178.1 km; 110.64 mi) from London Waterloo, just 2 miles 49 chains (4.2 km; 2.61 mi) from Bournemouth. At the east end of the platform is the junction for Bournemouth Traincare Depot which was built on the closed route to Bournemouth West.

== Services ==
The station is managed and served by South Western Railway. The typical off-peak service on Mondays to Saturdays is two trains in each direction every hour, one between Poole and London Waterloo and the other between Weymouth and London Waterloo. There is one train per hour in each direction between Weymouth and London Waterloo on Sundays.

| Preceding station | National Rail | Following station |
|---|---|---|
| Bournemouth | South Western Railway (South West Main Line) | Parkstone |
| | Disused railways | |
| Bournemouth West (Line and station closed) | Somerset & Dorset Joint Railway (LSWR and Midland Railways) | Parkstone |

== Bus connections ==
The station is served by several bus routes operated by Morebus from nearby Branksome Roundabout.
