= British Rail Class 442 =

British Electric passenger trains

British Rail Class 442 Wessex Electrics
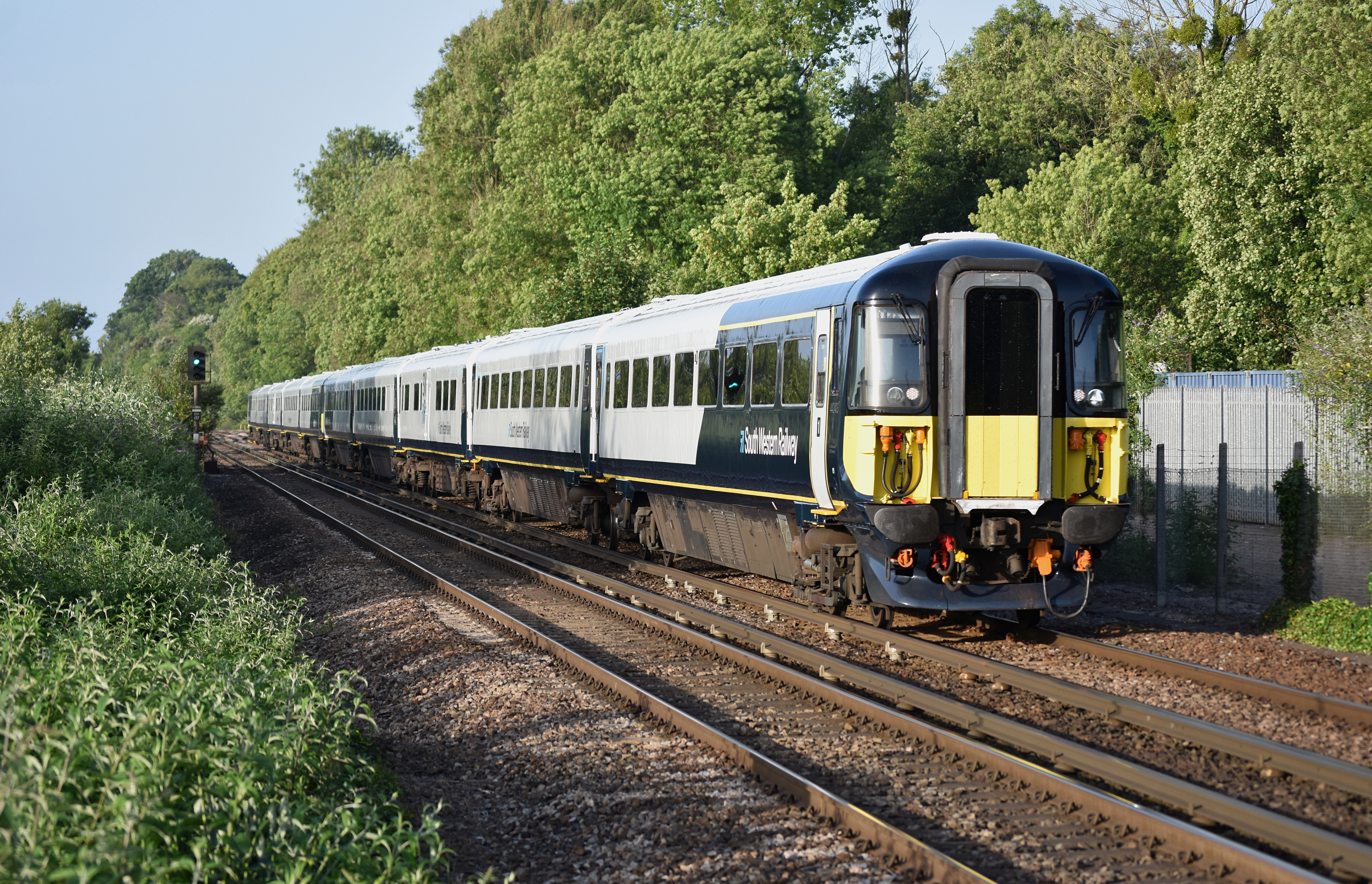
- South Western Railway Class 442 train near Shawford in 2019

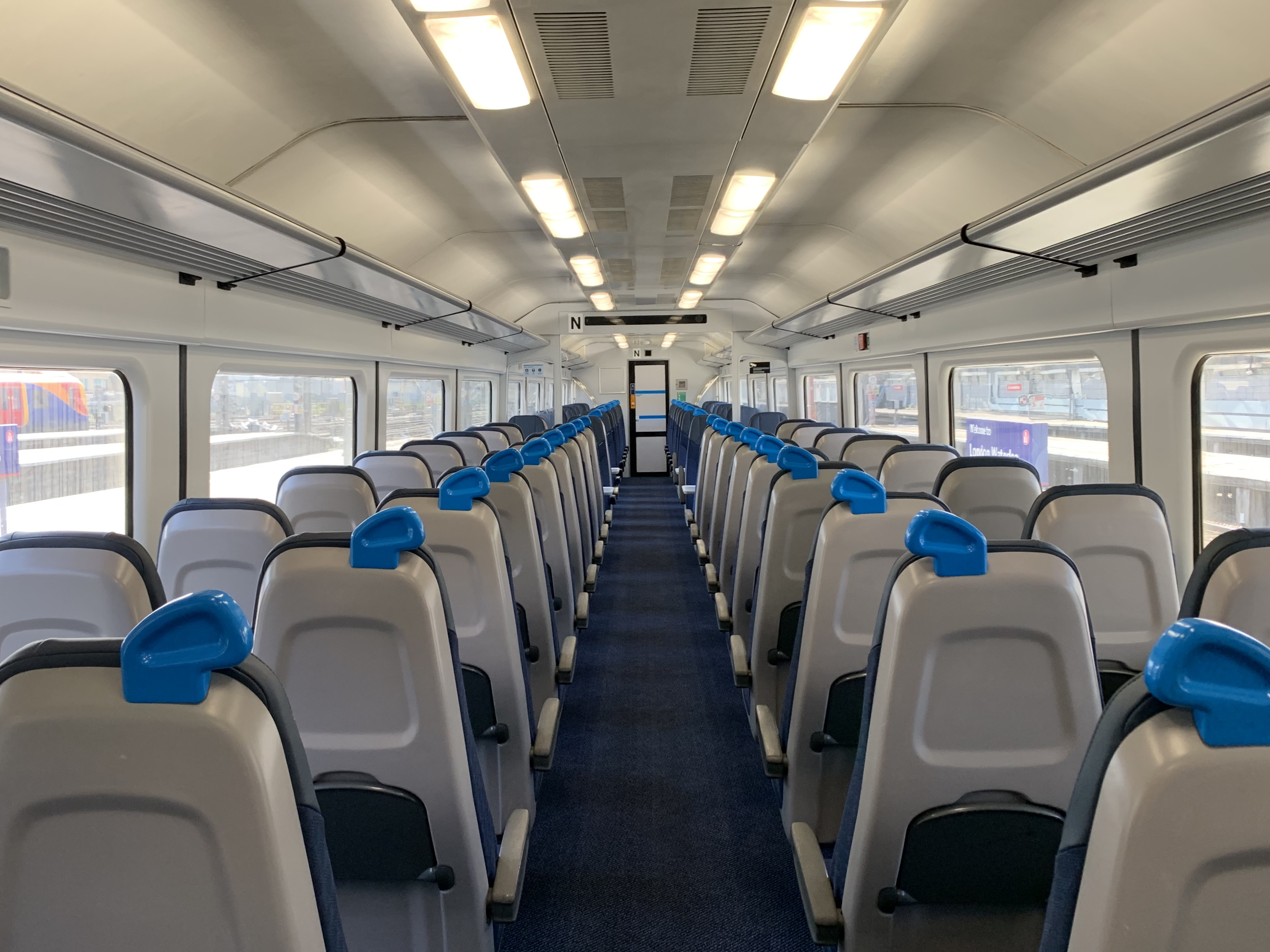
- Standard-class saloon of an SWR-refurbished unit
- In service: 1988 – March 2021
- Manufacturer: British Rail Engineering Limited
- Order nos.: 31030 (DTF vehicles); 31031 (DTS vehicles); 31032 (TS(A) vehicles); 31033 (TS(B) vehicles); 31034 (MBLS vehicles)
- Built at: Derby Litchurch Lane Works
- Family name: Mark 3
- Replaced: Class 432; Class 438; Class 460
- Constructed: 1987–1989
- Refurbished: 2008–2009 (Gatwick Express); 2017–2018 (SWR)
- Scrapped: 2020 – 2021
- Number built: 24
- Number scrapped: 24 (except 1 preserved DTS vehicle)
- Successor: Class 387 (Gatwick Express); Class 444 (SWR)
- Formation: 5 cars per unit; As built: DTF-TS(A)-MBLS-TS(B)-DTS; As refurbished by SWR: DTSO(A)-TSO-MBC-TSOW-DTSO(B)
- Diagram: DTF vehicles: EE160; TS(A) vehicles: EH288; MBLS vehicles: ED265; TS(B) vehicles: EH289; DTS vehicles: EE273
- Design code: 5-WES
- Fleet numbers: 442401–442424
- Capacity: As built: 300 seats (50 first class, 250 standard); SWT: 316 seats (50 first class, 266 standard); GX: 346 seats (24 first class, 322 standard); SWR: 336 seats (32 first class, 304 standard)
- Owner: Angel Trains
- Operators: Network SouthEast; South West Trains; Gatwick Express; South Western Railway
- Depots: Bournemouth; Stewarts Lane (London)
- Lines served: Brighton Main Line; Portsmouth Direct Line; South West Main Line

Specifications
- Car body construction: Steel
- Car length: 22.570 m (74 ft 0.6 in)
- Width: 2.740 m (8 ft 11.9 in)
- Height: 3.810 m (12 ft 6.0 in)
- Doors: Single-leaf sliding plug (2 per side per car)
- Wheelbase: Over bogie centres: 16.000 m (52 ft 5.9 in)
- Maximum speed: 100 mph (160 km/h)
- Weight: MBLS: 51 tonnes (50 long tons; 56 short tons); Trailers: 34 tonnes (33 long tons; 37 short tons)
- Traction motors: 4 × English Electric EE546, each of 300 kW (400 hp)
- Power output: 1,200 kW (1,610 hp)
- HVAC: Air conditioning
- Electric systems: 750 V DC third rail
- Current collection: Contact shoe
- UIC classification: 2′2′+2′2′+Bo′Bo′+2′2′+2′2′
- Bogies: Powered: BREL P7-3; Unpowered: BREL T3-7
- Minimum turning radius: 90 m (295 ft 3 in)
- Braking system: Electro-pneumatic
- Safety systems: AWS; TPWS
- Coupling system: Drop-head Buckeye
- Multiple working: Within class, and with locomotives of Classes 33/1 and 73/1
- Track gauge: 1,435 mm (4 ft 8 1/2 in) standard gauge

The British Rail Class 442 (5-WES) Wessex Electrics were electric multiple unit passenger trains introduced in 1988 by Network SouthEast on the South West Main Line from London Waterloo to Weymouth to coincide with the electrification of the line from Bournemouth. Twenty-four five-car units were built by British Rail Engineering Limited's Derby Litchurch Lane Works.

Following the privatisation of British Rail, the fleet was sold to Angel Trains and operated by South West Trains up until February 2007, when they were replaced by Class 444 and Class 450s. After a period in storage, they were leased to Southern for use on Gatwick Express services from London Victoria to Gatwick Airport and Brighton. The units were withdrawn from Gatwick Express services in 2016 and from Southern peak-hour London Bridge to Brighton and Eastbourne services in March 2017.

From 2019, eighteen were leased by South Western Railway and were refurbished for use on London Waterloo to Portsmouth Harbour services. However they were again withdrawn in March 2020 due to services being reduced as a result of the COVID-19 pandemic. In March 2021, South Western Railway purchased all 18 from Angel Trains, stripped the fleet of their recently refurbished equipment for parts and scrapped them.

The class holds the world speed record for a third-rail train, having attained 109 mph (175 km/h) on a test run prior to entering service.

== Description ==
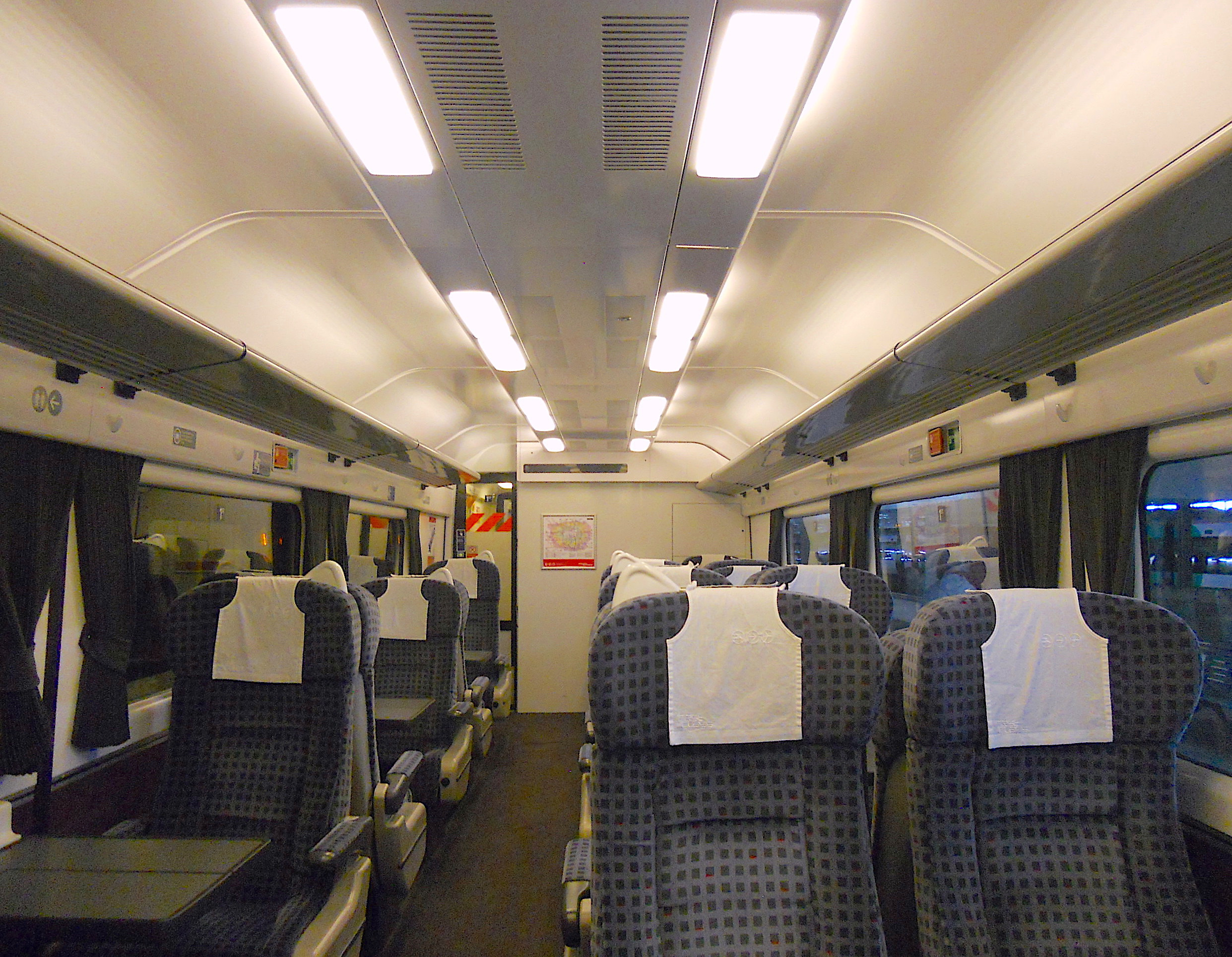
The interior of refurbished First Class section

The Class 442 is based on the British Rail Mark 3 carriage bodyshell, and has a number of features which distinguish it from the slam-door units it replaced:

- Vehicle length is 23 m (75 ft), as opposed to 20 m (66 ft).
- All vehicles are air-conditioned, and have powered internal doors and external plug doors.
- Units consist of five vehicles, and operate as 5 or 10-car trains, replacing 4-car units which operated as 4, 8 or 12-car trains.
- Maximum permitted speed is 100 mph (160 km/h).

As was common on the British Rail Southern Region, many electrical components – including traction motors and electrical control gear – were salvaged from the Class 432 units they replaced. For this reason, the older 4REP and 4TC units had to be withdrawn before their replacements were built.

The 442 units are unique among all of the various Mark 3-based multiple-unit classes in that they use the full-length 23-metre version of the Mark 3 bodyshell with sealed, non-opening windows - hence they bear a very close resemblance to the coaching stock used in both HST sets and loco-hauled expresses.

The Class 442 was one of the first types to make extensive use of plastics in construction hence the nickname "Plastic Pig".

Dot matrix destination signs were originally provided on the top of the nose end gangway. They were removed in the early 1990s, due to legibility issues, and reinstalled at a different position in 2008, in preparation for service on the Gatwick Express.

== Operations ==
=== Network SouthEast ===
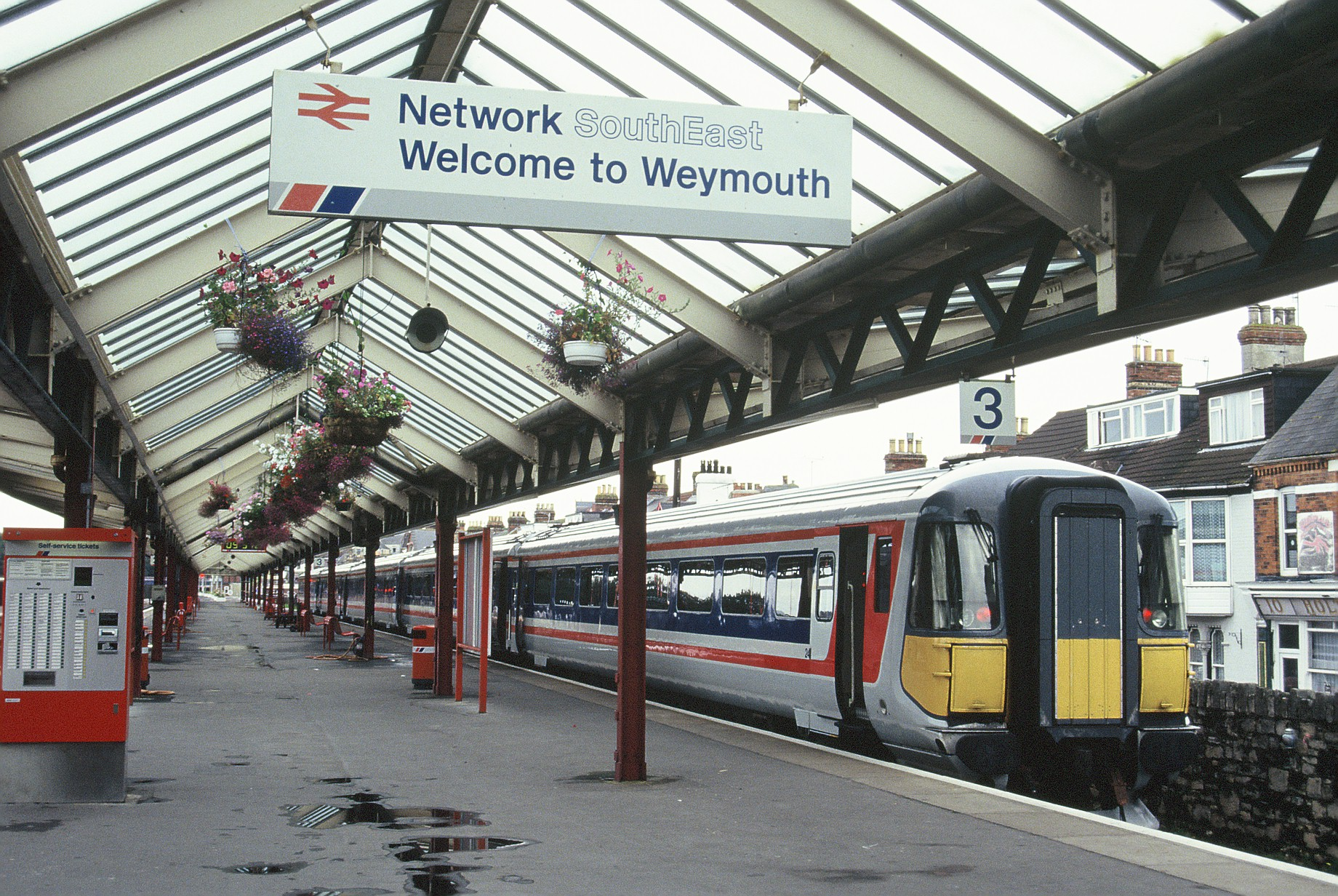
Network SouthEast Class 442 at Weymouth in 1992

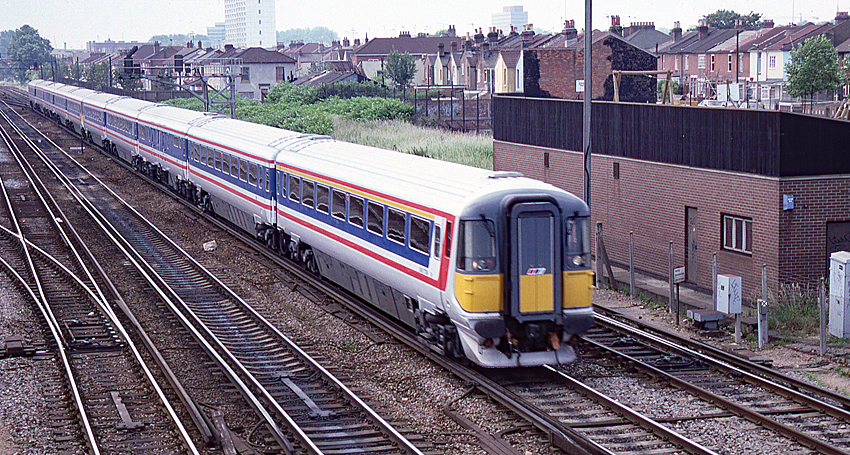
Network SouthEast Class 442 approaching Mount Pleasant crossing, 1988

The first unit was handed over to Network SouthEast on 18 December 1987. Prior to entering service, one set a world speed record for a third-rail train of 109 mph (175 km/h). The units were initially used solely on the Weymouth line, but through the 1990s began to be used on the London Waterloo to Portsmouth Direct Line. The increased top speed of the Class 442, combined with timetable changes, resulted in some minor journey time improvements, for example a non-stop service reaching Southampton Airport Parkway from London Waterloo in 58 minutes, over a journey of around 74 miles (119 km).

=== South West Trains ===
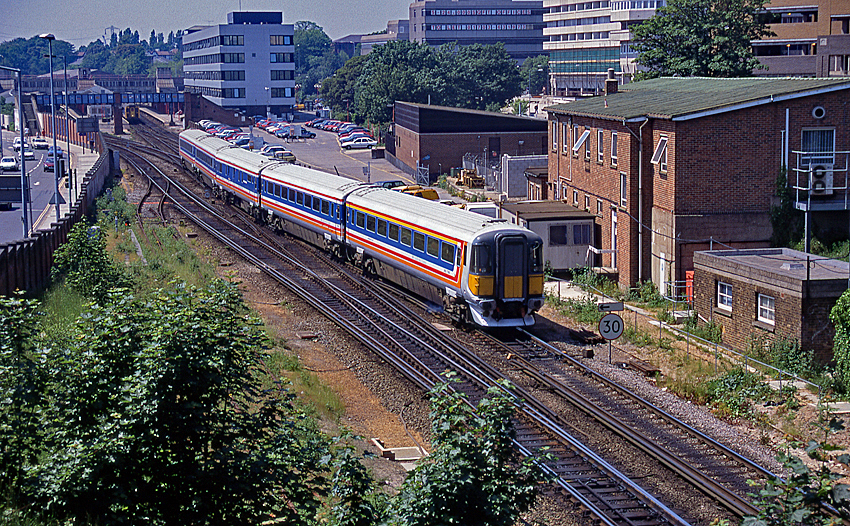
442402 in transitional SWT livery in 1996

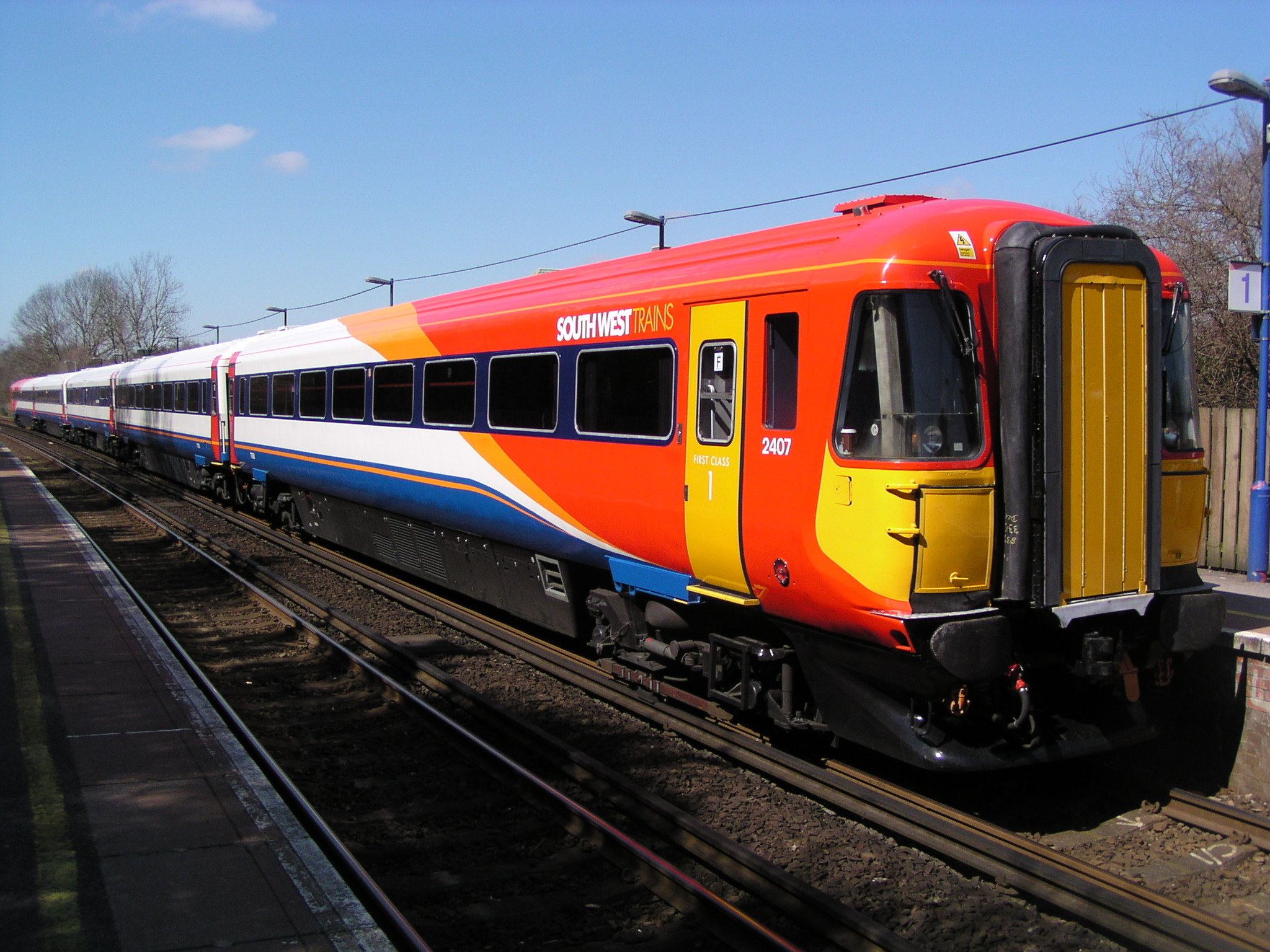
Class 442 at Moreton in April 2006

As part of the privatisation of British Rail, the Class 442s were sold to Angel Trains and leased to South West Trains. Unit 442402 soon had an orange stripe added to its Network SouthEast livery, which looked very similar to Stagecoach's corporate image. From 1998, the units began to receive the new South West Trains livery of white, red and blue as they underwent overhaul at Crewe Works. Unit 442404 was the first to be so treated.

During the late 1990s and early 2000s, the fleet continued to operate express services from London to both Weymouth and Portsmouth. However, in 2004, when the Class 444s entered service, the 442s were again used solely on the Weymouth line. In early 2006, the fleet began to receive overhauls, with units emerging in a slightly revised livery which conformed with the Disability Discrimination Act. By January 2007 14 of the 24 units had received overhauls.

Despite their recent overhauls, South West Trains withdrew the entire fleet in 2007. They were replaced by Class 444s, augmented by Class 450s, spare from the re-introduction of Class 458s.

The last Class 442 Weymouth to London Waterloo operation was on 24 January 2007 with the final service on 3 February 2007. The units were moved from Bournemouth Traincare Depot to Eastleigh Works for warm storage.

=== Southern/Gatwick Express ===
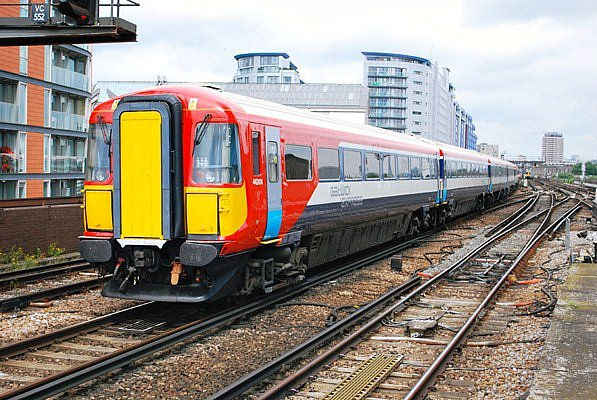
Class 442 in Gatwick Express livery at Battersea Park in 2009

Southern leased 17 to operate the extended Gatwick Express service which began in December 2008. Originally, some units were kept out of service for spare parts. In October 2008, unit 442414 became the first unit to be fully refurbished inside and out.

The new extended Gatwick Express service was introduced on 15 December 2008. The new service, operating Monday to Friday, comprised six services in the morning from Brighton and six services to Brighton in the evening with an additional service terminating at Haywards Heath.

In addition, some peak-hour services to/from London Bridge to Brighton and Eastbourne were operated by pairs of Class 442s. In April 2009. Southern took an extra two units from Eastleigh Works to make up for the shortfall in units caused by their use on other services.

When Govia retained the Southern franchise, it was announced that the remaining off-lease 442s would return to service after an overhaul to replace Class 460s. In 2012, the branding on the units was modified to read simply 'Express' rather than 'Gatwick Express' to avoid passenger confusion when used on fast Brighton Main Line services that do not call at Gatwick.

Govia ordered Class 387/2 EMUs for the Brighton and Gatwick Express routes. The 387s began to enter service on 29 February 2016, with the Class 442s phased out by the end of 2016, with the exception of the Brighton and Eastbourne peak-time commuter services that continued to be operated by a pair of 442s until March 2017.

The last passenger service was on 10 March 2017 which was the 17:57 London Bridge to Brighton formed of units 442410 and 442413. A railtour ran on 12 March 2017 by units 442402 and 442408 commemorated the final send off to the entire fleet from services on the Brighton Main Line. All were taken to Ely for storage.

=== South Western Railway ===
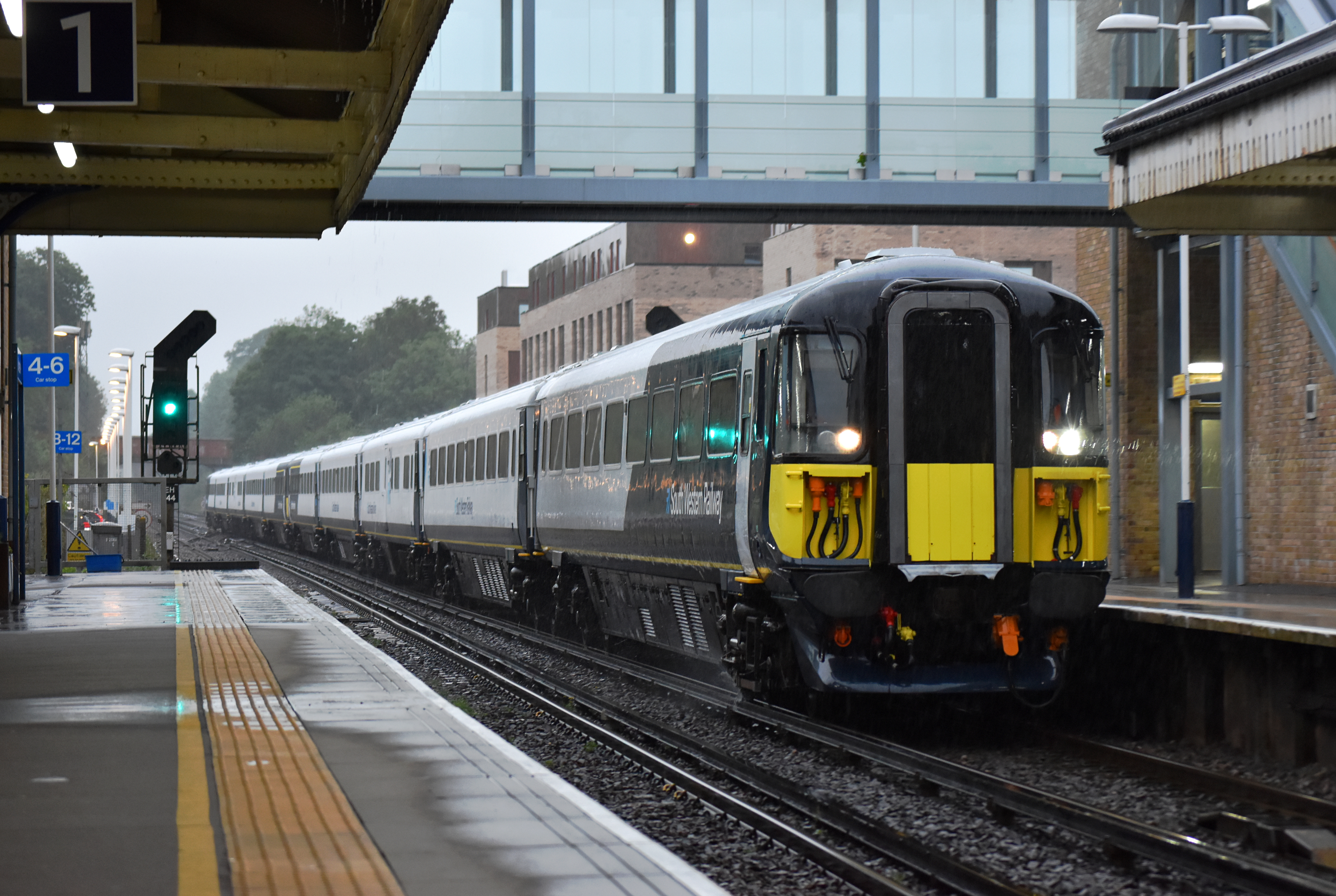
Class 442 in South Western Railway livery at Winchester in 2019

In March 2017, South Western Railway (SWR) was awarded the South Western franchise, announcing plans to refurbish 18 Class 442s for use on London Waterloo to Portsmouth services.

SWR awarded Kiepe Electric a contract to undertake the £45m refurbishment. Work was to include replacing the life-expired DC traction equipment (salvaged from older trains built during the 1960s) with an AC package incorporating IGBT technology from Kiepe Electric Düsseldorf. New brake controls from Knorr-Bremse Rail Vehicle Systems would have permitted regenerative braking.

Delays led to the first services of refurbished units due to begin in May 2019. However, problems with the door locks caused the trains to be temporarily removed from service again until June 2019 for the fault to be rectified.

The same limited service continued until 2 September 2019, when they were withdrawn from service due to fears that the units were wrongly turning signals to danger as the train approached them. It was thought to be around the Earlsfield area that they were doing this which caused delays on the busy section of track they operated on. The withdrawal of the trains continued until the issue was resolved and testing of the units was undertaken, allowing the class to re-enter service on 6 January 2020 beginning on the London Waterloo to Portsmouth route this time.

Due to the COVID-19 pandemic, on 18 March 2020, all were again taken out of service following the subsequent reduction of service levels. This became the last time that the units would see service as, in March 2021, South Western Railway purchased all 18 from Angel Trains to scrap them. SWR replaced them with rebuilt Class 458s. All had received new interiors and 14 of the 18 had been fitted with new traction equipment. All were taken to Wolverton Works for component recovery before being sent by road to Sims Metal, Newport for scrapping.

=== Other proposals ===
The Department for Transport gave bidders for the TransPennine Express franchise the option of using Class 442s. However, the winning bidder did not take up the option.

In November 2016, Alliance Rail Holdings announced plans to use the 442s on a new intercity express service which would operate on the South West Main Line between London Waterloo and Southampton Central under the Grand Southern brand. The proposal was rejected by the Office of Rail & Road on 1 August 2018, because it was concluded that the 442s were no longer available for lease, and Alliance Rail had no alternative rolling stock plans. The services would have operated as intercity services with each 5-car train offering around 300 seats.

In February 2020 the first two sets (442405 and 442424) were scrapped at Eastleigh.

=== Preservation ===
In 2016 a driving car from 442401 was nominated for the National Collection. After the National Railway Museum declined to take the nominated carriage, 77382, it was placed in the custody of Northumbria Rail, Bedlington.

A cab from 442405 has also been preserved at The Cab Yard at Cynhiedre, Wales.

== Accidents and incidents ==
- On 3 September 1989, unit 442407 ran away at Bournemouth Depot and overran buffers.
- On 7 August 2016, a passenger travelling on unit 442411 was fatally injured when his head struck a signal gantry near Balham, south London. He had been leaning out of the window opposite the guard's compartment in the central carriage. This window could not be locked and there was no bar in place to prevent passengers from leaning out of it.
- On 21 January 2020, a locked brake caused smoke to fill one of the carriages on unit 442413. Unlike modern stock, the 442s have no driver indication of such a fault. When the problem was discovered, the train was halted at Petersfield and passengers were evacuated. The passengers praised the actions of the staff and train crew at the scene.

== Fleet details ==
Units were numbered 442401–442424 and were formed of two driving trailers, two intermediate trailers, and an intermediate motor vehicle. In accordance with Southern Region practice, the units only carried the last four digits of their unit numbers when in service with Network SouthEast and South West Trains. Once refurbished for Southern, and subsequently South Western Railway, the units carried the full six digits.

The motor buffet vehicles were all modernised in a works programme at Crewe Works in 1997/98. At the same time units were repainted from their original Network SouthEast livery into South West Trains white livery. During 2006 Angel Trains sent some units to Bombardier at Ilford, where the livery was modified to make it DDA compliant; however, not all trains were modified as it was later announced that the trains were to be withdrawn from service. In 2008, units started to go to Wolverton Works for refurbishment. The refurbishment included the removal of the buffet from the motor coach, all new seats, and the relocation of first class from the front of the train to the motor coach.

Vehicle details:
Number range	BR/NSE code	Description	SWR designation	Description
77382–77405	DTF	Driver's cab, Trailer car, First class	DTSO(A)	Driver's cab, Trailer car, Standard class, Open saloon, variant A
71818–71841	TS(A)	Trailer car, Standard class, variant A	TSO	Trailer car, Standard class, Open saloon
62937–62960	MBLS	Motor car, Buffet, Luggage compartment, Standard class	MBC	Motor car, Buffet, Composite (first- and standard-class sections)
71842–71865	TS(B)	Trailer car, Standard class, variant B	TSOW	Trailer car, Standard class, Open saloon, Wheelchair accommodation
77406–77429	DTS	Driver's cab, Trailer car, Standard class	DTSO(B)	Driver's cab, Trailer car, Standard class, Open saloon, variant B

=== List ===
During the years of Network SouthEast and South West Trains, various units have received names. Most of these were towns or places along the routes that they worked, but a few were for publicity purposes. When the South West Trains lease expired all nameplates were removed.

Unit	Former name	Vehicle numbers					Date withdrawn (SWT)	Date withdrawn (GX)	Date withdrawn (SWR)	Date back in service (SWR)	Notes
Unit	Former name	DTF	TS(A)	MBLS	TS(B)	DTS	Date withdrawn (SWT)	Date withdrawn (GX)	Date withdrawn (SWR)	Date back in service (SWR)	Notes
442401	Beaulieu	77382	71818	62937	71842	77406	22 January 2007	7 May 2016		Stored	Stripped for spares at Eastleigh Works, Jul 2020. 77382 preserved by Northumbrian Rail.
442402	County of Hampshire	77383	71819	62938	71843	77407	16 February 2007	13 March 2017		Stored	Stripped for spares at Wolverton Works, May 2021.
442403	The New Forest	77384	71820	62941	71844	77408	17 January 2007		2 September 2019	24 June 2019	Stripped for spares at Wolverton Works, June 2021.
442404	Borough of Woking	77385	71821	62939	71845	77409	15 January 2007	24 May 2016	2 September 2019	–	Stripped for spares at Wolverton Works, June 2021.
442405	City of Portsmouth	77386	71822	62944	71846	77410	15 February 2007			–	62944 scrapped at Raxstar Eastleigh, May 2020.
442406	Victory	77389	71823	62942	71847	77411	15 January 2007		2 September 2019	29 July 2019	Stripped for spares at Wolverton Works, Feb 2021. Scrapped at Sims Metals Newport in 2021.
442407	Thomas Hardy	77388	71824	62943	71848	77412	22 January 2007			–	Scrapped
442408	County of Dorset	77387	71825	62945	71849	77413	17 January 2007	13 March 2017	2 September 2019	24 June 2019	Stripped for spares at Wolverton Works, June 2021.
442409	Bournemouth Orchestras	77390	71826	62946	71850	77414	12 January 2007	7 May 2016		–	Stripped for spares at Wolverton Works, June 2021.
442410	Meridian Tonight	77391	71827	62948	71851	77415	24 January 2007	11 March 2017	2 September 2019	10 June 2019	Stripped for spares at Wolverton Works, May 2021
442411	Railway Children	77392	71828	62940	71858	77422	29 January 2007		2 September 2019	–	Stripped for spares at Wolverton Works, June 2021.
442412	Special Olympics	77393	71829	62947	71853	77417	12 February 2007			–	Placed in storage at Eastleigh Works in March 2020
442413	–	77394	71830	62949	71854	77418 (Note: For a short while the DTS vehicles from units 442413 and 442418 were swapped following problems with these units. The DTS from 442413 had a broken windscreen, and the motor coach in 442418 had suffered a failure. A complete working unit, numbered 442413, was thus created. The four coaches from the original 442413 carried the new livery, having just undergone overhaul, while the DTS (still numbered 2418) carried the old livery.)	2 February 2007	11 March 2017	2 September 2019	19 August 2019	Stripped for spares at Eastleigh works, June 2021.
442414	–	77395	71831	62950	71855	77419	24 January 2007		2 September 2019	–	Stripped for spares at Eastleigh Works, June 2021.
442415	Mary Rose	77396	71832	62951	71856	77420	10 November 2006	5 July 2016		–	Stripped for spares at Wolverton Works, July 2021.
442416	Mum in a Million 1997 Doreen Scanlon	77397	71833	62952	71857	77421	31 December 2006			June 2021	Stripped for spares at Wolverton Works in Jan 2021, scrapped June 2021.
442417	Woking Homes	77398	71834	62953	71852	77416	19 January 2007		2 September 2019	19 August 2019	Stripped for spares at Wolverton Works, February 2021.
442418	Wessex Cancer Trust	77399	71835	62954	71859	77423	24 January 2007	20 May 2016			Stripped for spares at Wolverton Works, July 2021.
442419	BBC South Today	77400	71836	62955	71860	77424	12 February 2007		2 September 2019		Stripped for spares at Wolverton Works, May 2021.
442420	City of Southampton	77401	71837	62956	71861	77425	12 January 2007		2 September 2019	10 June 2019	Stripped for spares at Wolverton Works, May 2021.
442421	–	77402	71838	62957	71862	77426	26 January 2007			–	Stripped for spares at Eastleigh Works, July 2020.
442422	Operation Overlord	77403	71839	62958	71863	77427	11 January 2007	8 April 2016	2 September 2019	–	Stripped for spares at Wolverton Works, Jul 2021.
442423	County of Surrey	77404	71840	62959	71864	77428	18 April 2007	7 July 2016	2 September 2019	–	Stripped for spares at Wolverton Works, June 2021.
442424	Gerry Newson	77405	71841	62960	71865	77429	22 January 2007	20 May 2016		–	62960 scrapped at Raxstar Eastleigh, May 2020.
