= Bournemouth West railway station =

Former railway station in Dorset, England

Coordinates: 50.72218°N 1.89370°W

Bournemouth West
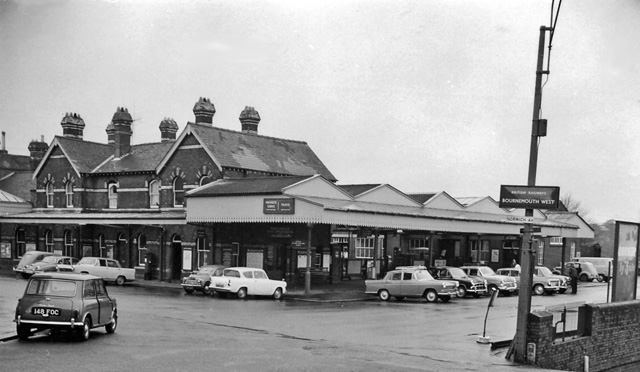
- The station approach in 1963

General information
- Location: Bournemouth, Dorset; England
- Grid reference: SZ076914
- Platforms: 6

Other information
- Status: Disused

History
- Pre-grouping: LSWR
- Post-grouping: SR

Key dates
- 15 June 1874: Opened
- 6 September 1965: Closed to passengers
- 4 October 1965: Closed completely
Location

Bournemouth West was a railway station in Bournemouth, Dorset, England which closed in 1965.

== History ==
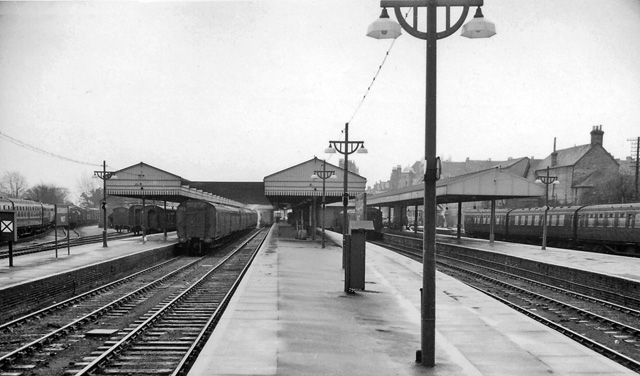
View eastward, to buffer-stops; the terminus of ex-LSWR main line from London in 1963

The station opened on 15 June 1874. It was the southern terminus for many services off the Somerset and Dorset Joint Railway, as well as being the terminus for trains from London Waterloo and local services.

The station was closed during the electrification of the London Waterloo to Bournemouth line. Originally, the closure was meant to be temporary, pending completion of the project, as it was thought that Bournemouth Central did not have the capacity to handle all of Bournemouth's trains. Experience during the temporary closure showed that the newly electrified Central station could handle all the trains in the town, so the closure became permanent.

Passenger trains were withdrawn from 6 September 1965. A substitute bus service was provided until its official closure on 4 October 1965; the station was later demolished.

Preceding station	Disused railways	Following station
Terminus	Somerset and Dorset Joint Railway; Dorset Central Railway	Branksome; Line closed, station open
Terminus	London and South Western Railway; Southampton and Dorchester Railway	Meyrick Park Halt; Line and station closed

== Accidents and incidents ==
On 17 August 1956 a rake of carriages ran away colliding with another rake of carriages and a parcels van. The van was pushed into the parcels office bringing down its roof crushing two cars.

== The site today ==
The former station site is now occupied by a car park and the A338 Wessex Way. Bournemouth Traincare Depot occupies the approach to the station.

== External sources ==
- Bournemouth West
- SEMG online
- The station on navigable 1946 O. S. map
