= Bournemouth railway station =

Railway station in Dorset, England

Coordinates: 50.728°N 1.864°W

Bournemouth
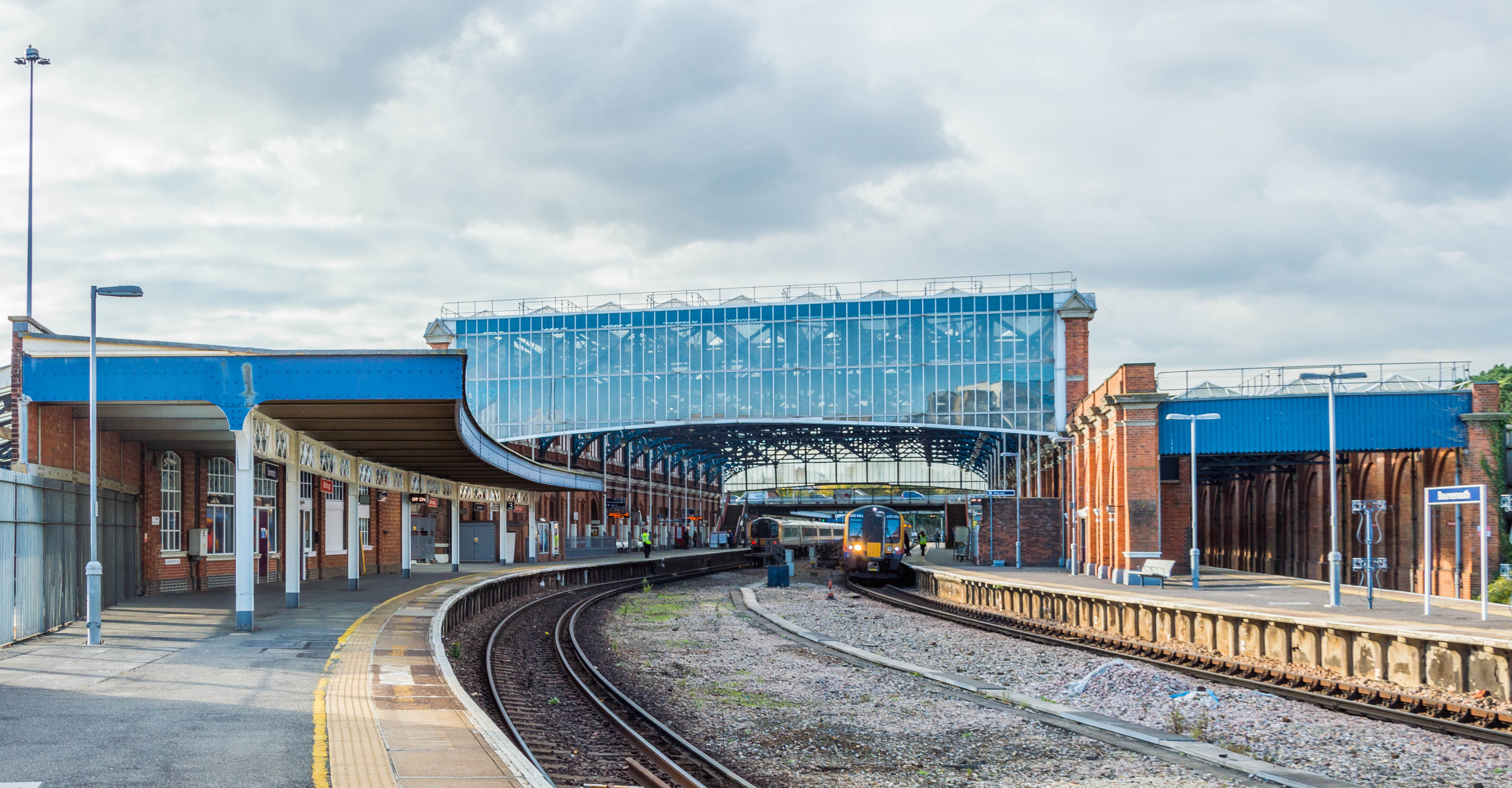
- The station seen from the London end in 2015

General information
- Location: Bournemouth, Dorset, England
- Grid reference: SZ096919
- Manager: South Western Railway
- Platforms: 4

Other information
- Station code: BMH
- Classification: DfT category C1

History
- Pre-grouping: London and South Western Railway
- Post-grouping: Southern Railway

Key dates
- 20 July 1885: Opened as Bournemouth East
- 1 July 1893: Renamed Bournemouth Central
- 10 July 1967: Renamed Bournemouth

Passengers
- 2020/21: ▼0.698 million
- Interchange: ▼13,233
- 2021/22: ▲2.010 million
- Interchange: ▲39,650
- 2022/23: ▲2.430 million
- Interchange: ▲48,487
- 2023/24: ▲2.521 million
- Interchange: ▲62,051
- 2024/25: ▲2.664 million
- Interchange: ▲71,883
Location
Notes
- Passenger statistics from the Office of Rail and Road

Bournemouth railway station serves the seaside town of Bournemouth, in Dorset, England. It was opened by the London and South Western Railway in 1885 as Bournemouth East but was known as Bournemouth Central from 1893 until 1967 when it became just 'Bournemouth'.

It is managed by South Western Railway, and is one of the principal stops on the South West Main Line at milepost 108 from London Waterloo, between Pokesdown and Branksome stations. The station also is served by CrossCountry services via Reading and Birmingham New Street to Manchester Piccadilly.

== History ==
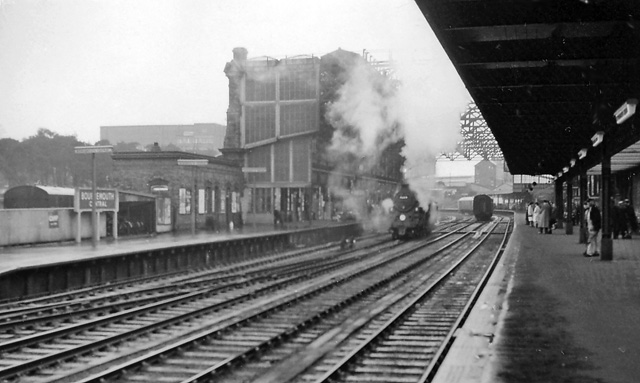
View of the station from the Weymouth end in 1963

The first Bournemouth station opened on the east side of Holdenhurst Road in 1870. This was renamed 'Bournemouth East' in 1874 but was replaced after 15 years by the present station on the west side of Holdenhurst Road. This new station was designed by William Jacob, chief engineer of the London and South Western Railway, and opened on 20 July 1885 as 'Bournemouth East'; it replaced the original station of the same name on the other side of Holdenhurst Road from 1870 to 1885.

Bournemouth railway station was served by services and goods deliveries across five railways, the South West Main Line, Southampton and Dorchester Railway, Ringwood, Christchurch and Bournemouth Railway, Salisbury and Dorset Junction Railway and Somerset and Dorset Joint Railway.

It was renamed 'Bournemouth Central' on 1 July 1893 and became 'Bournemouth' on 10 July 1967, following the closure of Bournemouth West. By 1967, third rail electrification had reached Bournemouth and continued beyond to Branksome so that electric trains could reach Bournemouth Train & Rolling Stock Maintenance Depot but no further. From the end of the steam era, most trains were formed of 4-REP EMUs coupled up with one or more unpowered 4-TC units. The 4-REP unit would be uncoupled at Bournemouth and a Class 33/1 diesel locomotive attached to the 4-TCs for the onward journey to Weymouth. This continued until the electrification of the line from Branksome to Weymouth and the introduction of Class 442 units in 1988.

The station roof was severely damaged by the Great Storm of 1987 that hit the South of England. It was extensively refurbished in 2000 by Railtrack after many years of disrepair and being surrounded by scaffolding to protect people from falling debris.

=== Motive power depot ===
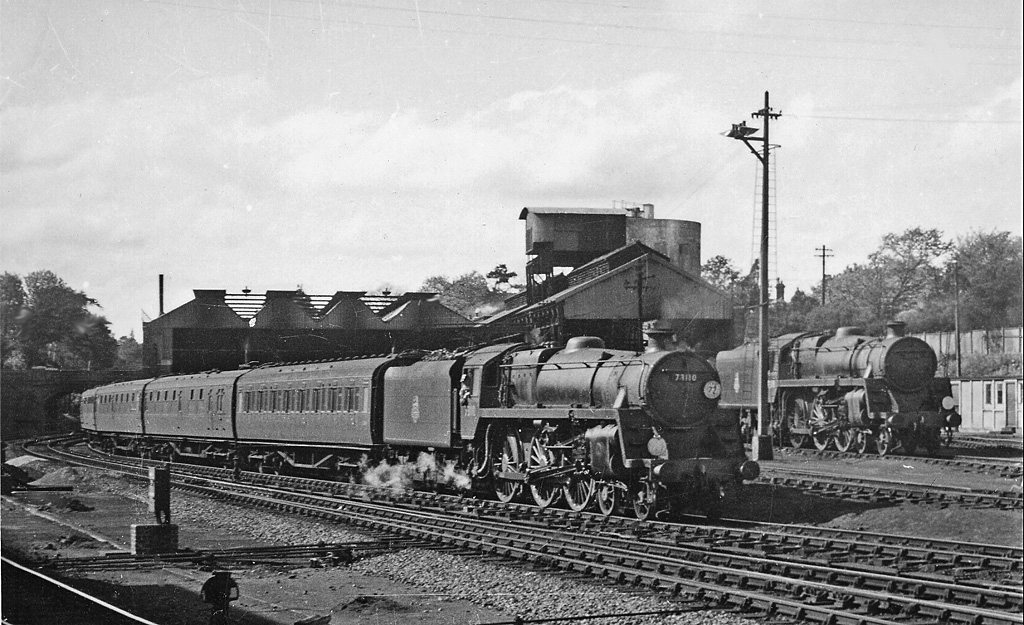
BR Standard 5MT 4-6-0 No. 73110 approaching the station 10 May 1958. The depot is visible behind the locomotive

A small locomotive depot was opened at Bournemouth East in 1870, but closed in 1883. This was replaced by a larger shed, adjacent to Bournemouth Central station, in 1883. This, in turn, was supplemented by another shed nearby in 1888.

In 1921, the 1883 shed was closed and the 1888 one was extended to increase capacity; between 1936 and 1938 this was rebuilt and enlarged. The new shed included a 65 ft (20 m) turntable and a 50 LT (51 t) hoist. However the facilities remained cramped and awkwardly sited; there were proposals to move the depot to Branksome which were never implemented. This site therefore remained in use until June 1967 when the site was cleared.

=== Accidents and incidents ===
A train hauled by SR West Country Class 4-6-2 No. 34045 Ottery St. Mary was derailed by trap points at the west end of the down platform on 2 September 1961.

== Description ==
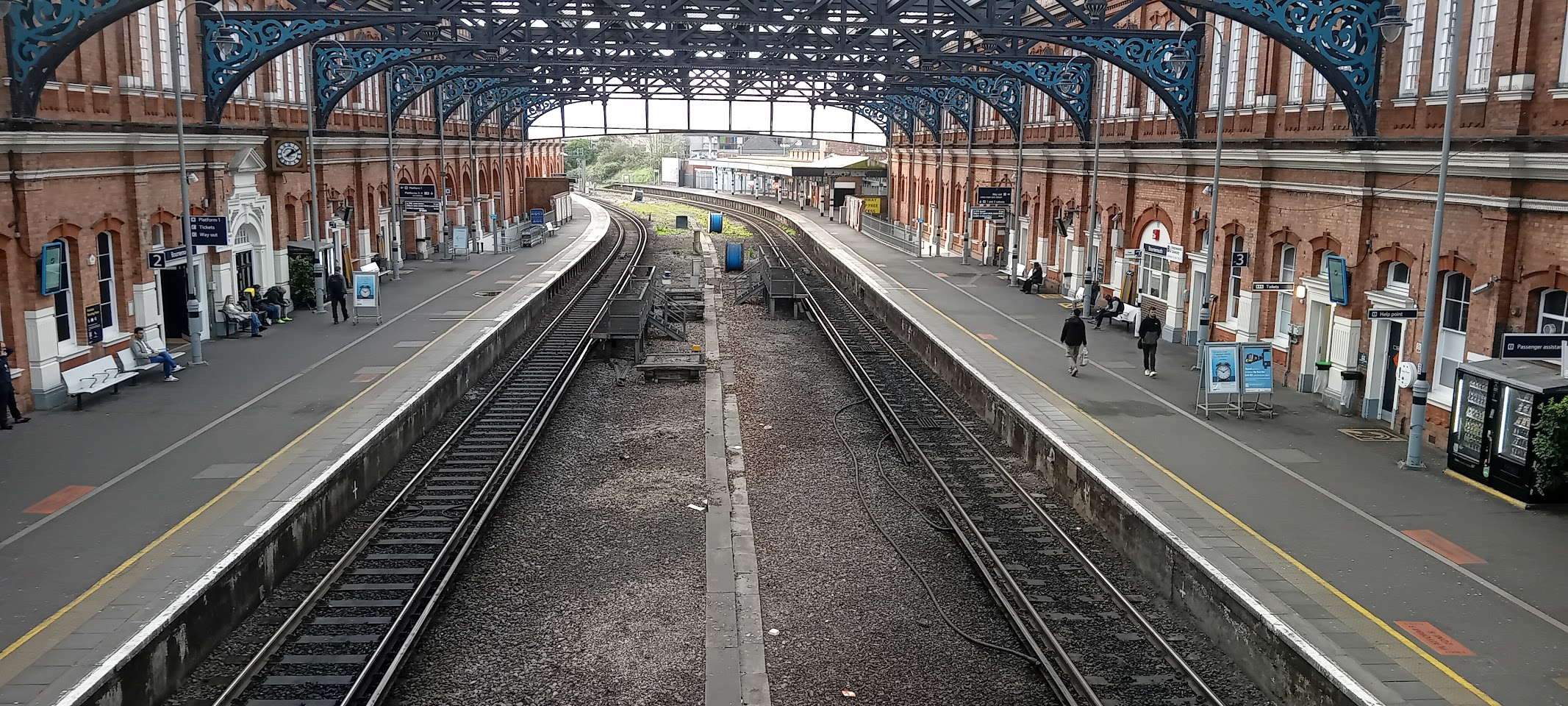
View from the footbridge, looking in the direction of London

It is 108 miles 2 chains (173.8 km; 108.03 mi) from London Waterloo. The station has four platforms:

- Platform 1: east facing bay platform capable of accommodating trains of up to four 20-metre coaches.
- Platform 2: for through services to the east towards Southampton and London Waterloo of up to 12 coaches.
- Platform 3: for terminating services from London Waterloo and Manchester Piccadilly, and through services to Weymouth of up to 13 coaches
- Platform 4: a further 11 coach length at the west end of platform 3.

The two-storey buildings are in red brick, divided into panels with three slim windows. The panels supported and separated by buttresses and pilasters with triangular pediments. A spacious train shed spans the two main platforms.

The station is fully accessible, with an underpass connecting platforms 2 and 3. British Transport Police have an office at Bournemouth station which acts as a regional hub.

== Services ==
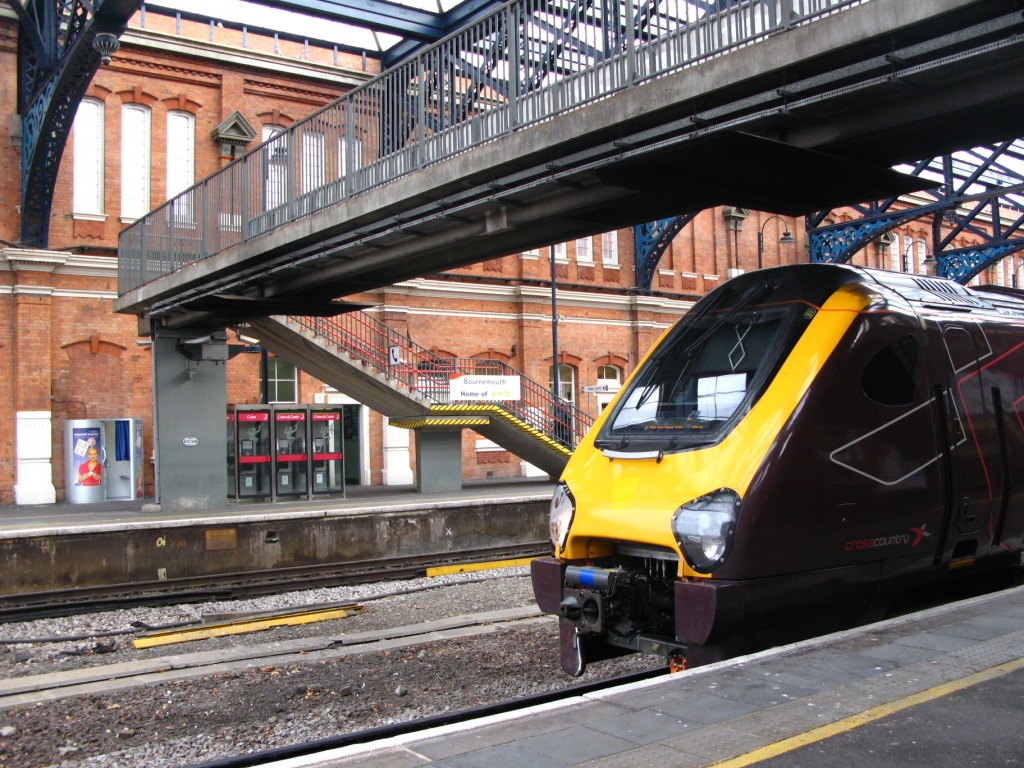
A CrossCountry service

Services at Bournemouth are operated by South Western Railway and CrossCountry. As of 2025, the typical off-peak service at the station is as follows:

- Monday to Saturday:
  - 2 tph to London Waterloo (1 fast, 1 semi-fast)
  - 2 tph to Weymouth
  - 1 tph to Poole
  - 1 tph to Winchester (stopping)
  - 1 tph to Manchester Piccadilly via Reading and Birmingham New Street
- Sunday:
  - 2 tph to London Waterloo (1 fast, 1 semi-fast)
  - 1 tph to Weymouth (calling at all stations except Holton Heath)
  - 1 tph to Poole (non-stop)
  - 1 tph to Manchester Piccadilly via Reading and Birmingham New Street

Additional peak-time services also operate, serving the intermediate stations between Bournemouth and Southampton Central, giving these stations 2 tph direct to (in the morning peak) and from (in the evening peak) London Waterloo.

Due to infrastructure restrictions, services west of Poole cannot normally operate with more than 5 carriages. Therefore, SWR services from London split at Bournemouth with only 5 carriages continuing to Weymouth. Towards London, services attach to an additional 5 carriages before continuing as a 10 carriage service.

Preceding station	National Rail	Following station
Brockenhurst or Southampton Central	CrossCountry (Manchester–Bournemouth)	Terminus
Pokesdown or New Milton or Brockenhurst	South Western Railway (South West Main Line)	Branksome or Poole
	Historical railways	
Boscombe (Line open, station closed)	London and South Western Railway (Southampton and Dorchester Railway)	Meyrick Park Halt (Line open, station closed)

=== Recent service history ===
In May 1994, Network SouthEast extended its service London Victoria to Southampton Central service to terminate at Bournemouth. It was truncated back to Southampton Central in the 2000s by Southern. The service was one of the few regular services to use platform 1.

Before the CrossCountry service was standardised in 2007, there were services to many other destinations than today; these included the Dorset Scot, Pines Express, Wessex Scot and other trains to Scotland via both the West Coast Main Line and East Coast Main Line, along with trains to Leeds and to Liverpool Lime Street.

== Bus connections ==
Bournemouth railway station also serves as a hub for local bus services. The down side of the station is Bournemouth Travel Interchange is served by Morebus, which operates frequent buses to the town centre, to Poole Bus Station and to Bournemouth Airport. It is also a stop on National Express coach routes which serve the town.
