= Bournemouth Traincare Depot =

Railway maintenance depot in Bournemouth, England

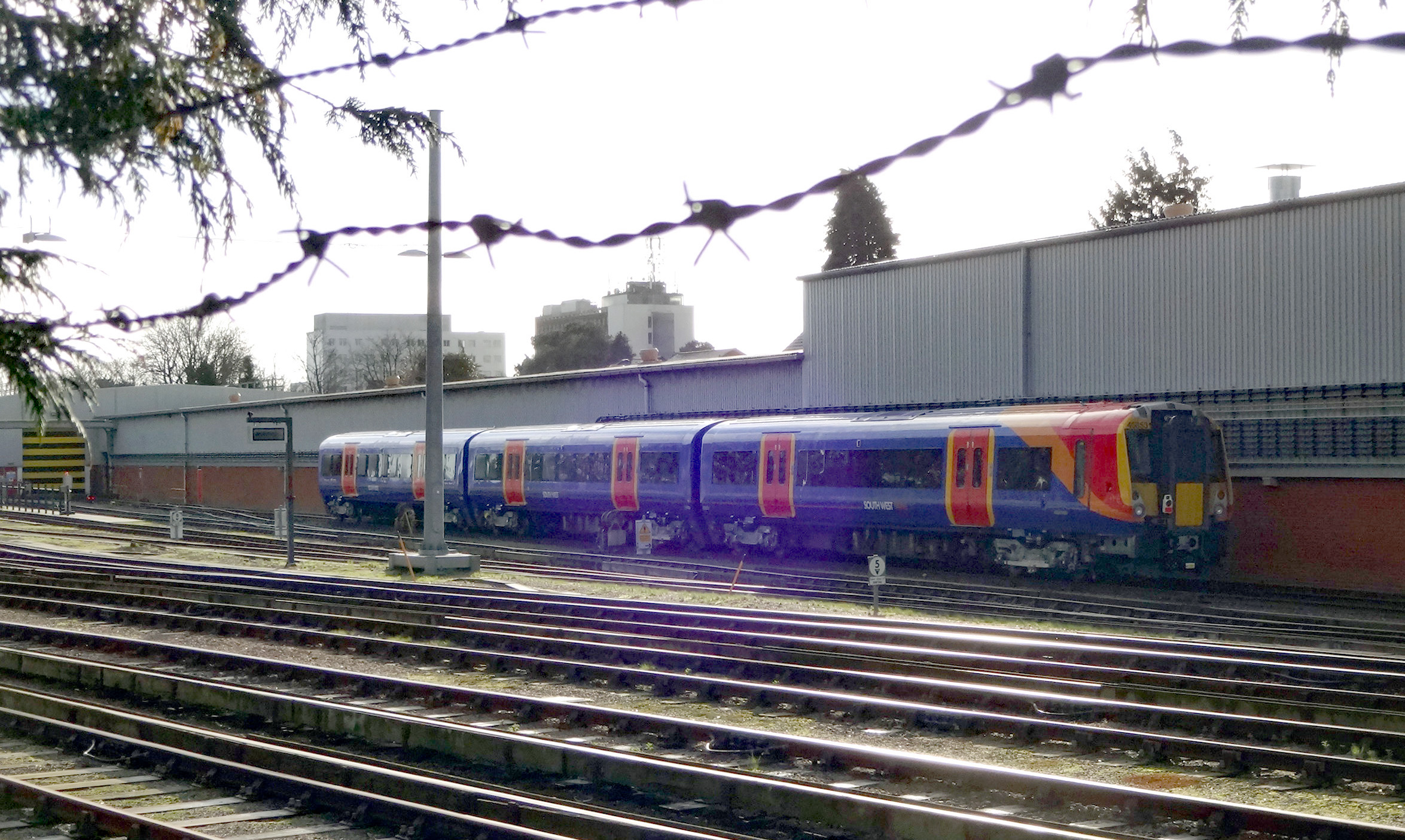
- A Class 458 unit outside the depot in 2016

- Location within Dorset

Location
- Location: Branksome, Dorset and Bournemouth, South West England
- Coordinates: 50°43′33″N 1°54′31″W
- OS grid: SZ065918

Characteristics
- Operator: South Western Railway
- Depot code: BM (1973 -)
- Type: EMU
- Routes served: South West Main Line

History
- Opened: 1967
- BR region: Southern Region
- Former depot code: 70F (1967 - May 1973)
- Former rolling stock: Class 432 (ex 430/4-REP); Class 438 (ex 491/4-TC)

Bournemouth Traincare Depot is a traction maintenance depot located in Bournemouth, South West England. The depot is situated on a spur off the South West Main Line and is to the east of Branksome station.

The depot code is BM.

== History ==
The site was originally the carriage sidings on the north side of the line between Bournemouth West Junction (the southern leg of the Branksome triangle) and Bournemouth West. The carriage sidings had 11 roads before World War II (no. 1 road being closest to the main line); six more (12–16) were added during the war, with no. 17 road being added in 1956. The Southern Railway had provided a four-road carriage shed that straddled roads 7–10.

Bournemouth West was closed as part of the 1966/67 electrification scheme. The line between Bournemouth West Junction and Gas Works Junction (the eastern leg of the Branksome triangle) was closed and lifted, and the carriage sidings were converted into a depot for the new electric multiple units.

Roads 5 and 6 were lifted for the conversion, and roads 2 and 3 were truncated. A new four-track inspection shed was erected, covering the old no. 1 road, the two old main lines and a new road laid to the south of the old main lines. The carriage washing plant that had been installed in 1956 was retained, along with a long headshunt to the west for access. Bournemouth West Junction Signal Box was retained, but downgraded to the status of a groundframe.

In 1986 the inspection shed was modified with a two-track extension to accommodate the upcoming Class 442 units.

== Allocation ==
The original allocation was the entire fleet of 4-REP (Class 430, later Class 432) and 4-TC (Class 491, later Class 438) units. The spare 4-TC driving trailer could often be seen out in the open from the A338 Wessex Way.

In 1987, the depot had an allocation of Classes 423, 432, and 438 EMUs. Around the same time, locomotive classes stabled there included Classes 09, 33, 47 and 73.

The depot's current allocation consists of South Western Railway's Class 159 Express Sprinter DMUs, Class 444 Desiros, Class 450 Desiros, Class 455, and Class 458 Coradia Juniper EMUs, with a Class 73 still being used as a shunter.
