= Boscombe railway station =

Disused railway station in Dorset, England

Coordinates: 50.73082°N 1.83961°W

Boscombe
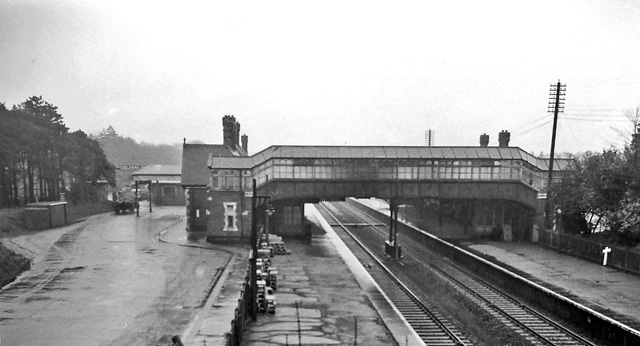
- View eastward towards Southampton, in 1963

General information
- Location: Boscombe, Borough of Bournemouth; England
- Platforms: 2

Other information
- Status: Disused

History
- Pre-grouping: London and South Western Railway
- Post-grouping: Southern Railway; Southern Region of British Railways

Key dates
- 1 June 1897: Station opened
- 4 October 1965: Station closed
Location

Boscombe railway station served the Royal Victoria Hospital and the centre of Boscombe, in Bournemouth, now in the county of Dorset, England; the station was located in Hampshire for the entirety of its existence. It was also the closest station to Dean Court, the home of the town's football club known during the station's life as Bournemouth and Boscombe Athletic FC. It was a stop on the South West Main Line.

== History ==
The station was opened in 1897, at which time the previous station with the name was renamed Pokesdown.

It had a goods yard, which received traffic from a large area of Bournemouth, and a large coal depot with sidings. It also had substantial brick buildings which were demolished a few years after closure.

Closure took place just before the electrification of the line through it, on 4 October 1965.

== The site today ==
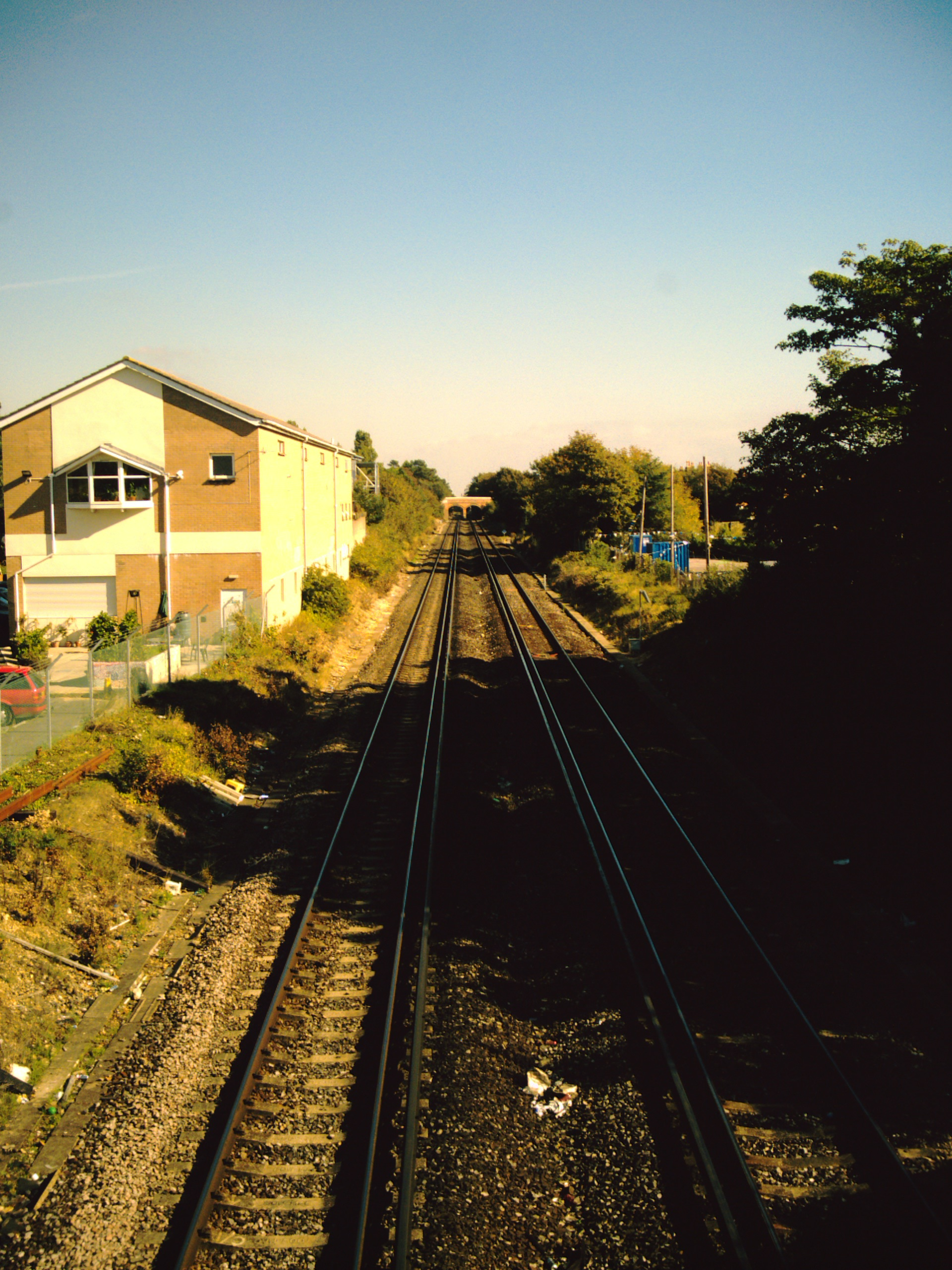
The site of the former station, October 2007

The area of the station yard is now occupied by a small industrial estate and the old coal yard awaits redevelopment. Trains on the South West Main Line pass the piles of gravel that are all that remain of the platforms. These can still be seen alongside the line from the bridge that carries the Ashley Road over the line just to the west of the site.

There have been calls for the re-opening of the station by the Dorset Area Rail Transport System, as well as by the Bournemouth Liberal Democrats. A major reported stumbling block to reopening is the substantial cost of installing lifts to the tracks and extending the platforms to accommodate 10-car trains.

Preceding station	Disused railways	Following station
Pokesdown	British Rail; Southern Region; South West Main Line	Bournemouth
