= Poole railway station =

Railway station in Dorset, England

Coordinates: 50.719°N 1.983°W

Poole
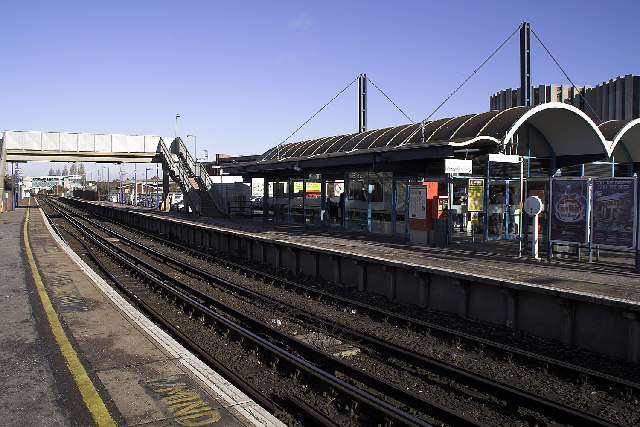

General information
- Location: Poole, Bournemouth, Christchurch and Poole; England
- Grid reference: SZ012911
- Managed by: South Western Railway
- Platforms: 2

Other information
- Station code: POO
- Classification: DfT category C1

History
- Opened: 2 December 1872
- Pre-grouping: London and South Western Railway
- Post-grouping: Southern Railway

Passengers
- 2020/21: ▼0.207 million
- Interchange: ▼1,692
- 2021/22: ▲0.673 million
- Interchange: ▲3,899
- 2022/23: ▲0.825 million
- Interchange: ▲4,049
- 2023/24: ▲0.857 million
- Interchange: ▲4,925
- 2024/25: ▲0.965 million
- Interchange: ▲6,630
Location
Notes
- Passenger statistics from the Office of Rail and Road

Poole railway station is a stop on the South West Main Line in England, serving the town of Poole in Dorset. It is situated near the town centre, next to Holes Bay. It is one of four stations in the Borough of Poole and is 113 miles 62 chains (183.1 km) down the main line from London Waterloo. (Note: Railways in the United Kingdom historically are measured in miles and chains. There are 80 chains to one mile.)

The station is operated by South Western Railway, which provides express and semi-fast services between London Waterloo and Weymouth. It is also the terminus for the London to Poole stopping service. Virgin CrossCountry used to operate services from Poole to the North West and Scotland but, since 2007, these now start/terminate at Bournemouth.

== History ==
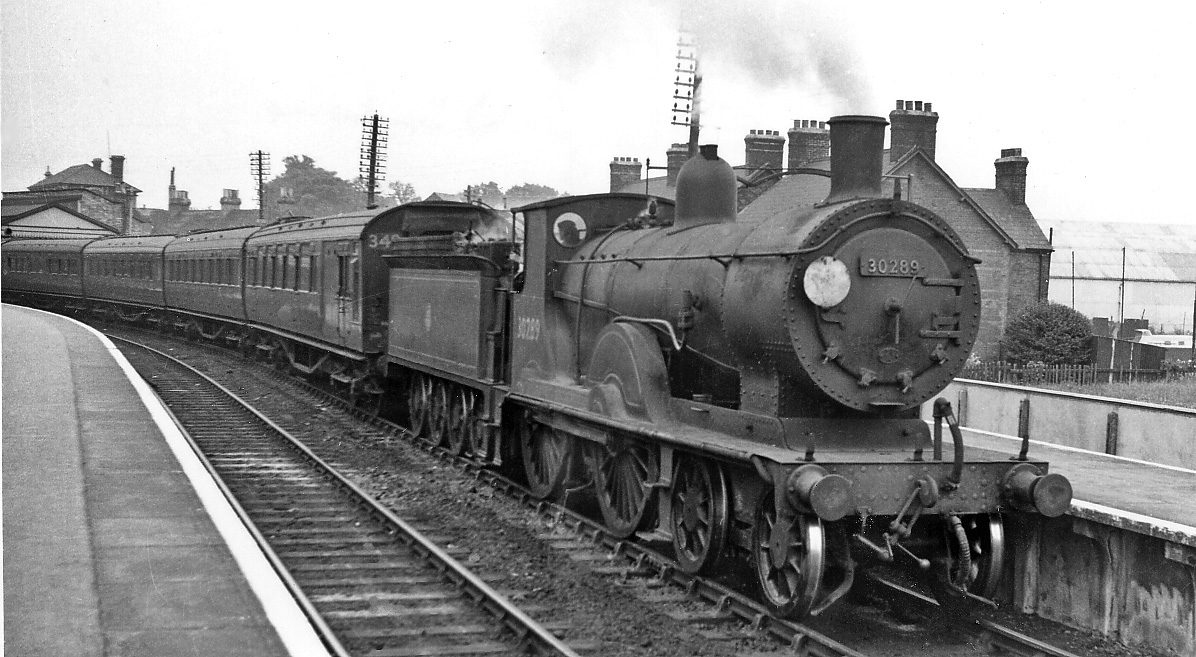
Down stopping train in 1958

The first Poole station was sited on the western side of Holes Bay, at the location that ultimately became Hamworthy Goods. There was a branch to the west of Holes Bay from Poole Junction (now Hamworthy) to the station called Poole, situated to the west of the bridge over the inlet. This was the Poole station that Somerset & Dorset trains reached originally over London and South Western Railway (L&SWR) tracks, after reversing at Wimborne.

This was inconvenient for access to the town centre and so the L&SWR interest built a railway to reach Poole itself from a new junction at what is now Broadstone, opening on 2 December 1872.

The new station was called New Poole and the junction station at what is now Broadstone was called New Poole Junction. When this caused confusion, the New Poole Junction station was renamed Broadstone, naming it after the nearby Broadstone Farm.

The original New Poole station buildings were built on the London-bound platform, close to the site of Towngate Bridge which replaced a level crossing in 1971. Following the opening of the Bournemouth Direct Railway line via Sway in 1888, the platforms' direction of travel was reversed. The Victorian buildings were replaced by a British Rail prefabricated structure on the other side of the line in the 1970s. This was later replaced by the current station building built in the late 1980s. In 2019, a proposal was made to relocate the station as part of plans to revive the town centre.

Until 1967, trains through Poole were normally steam hauled. Between 1967 and 1988, passenger services on the London Waterloo-Weymouth line were normally provided by Class 33/1 diesel locomotives with Class 438 coaching stock (also known as 4-TC units). The line through Poole was electrified in 1988, using the standard British Rail Southern Region direct current third rail at 750 volts. Class 442 electric multiple units (EMUs) were used initially following electrification, until they were displaced by new Class 444 in 2007. Nowadays, a mix of Classes 444 and 450 EMUs are used.

== Description ==
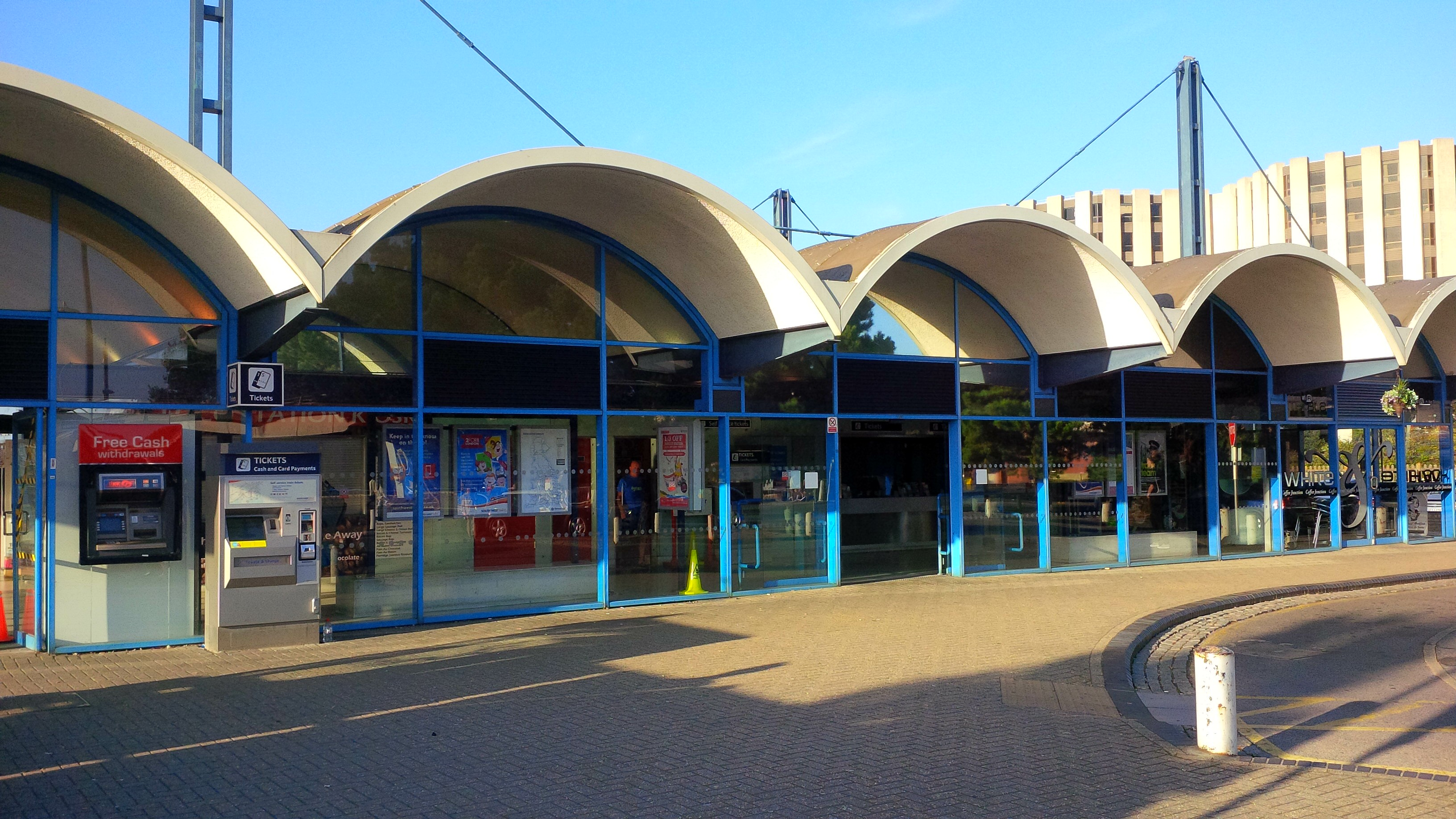
Exterior of Poole station

The station has two platforms, capable of handling trains of 12 coaches; platform 1 is bi-directional. Trains from London terminating at the station regularly use platform 1 before moving to the empty stock sidings further west and reversing for the return service. There was a goods line to Poole Quay, which joined the main line at the Hamworthy end of the station. It ran along part of what is now the Holes Bay relief road and West Quay Road. It closed in May 1960 and was removed in 1961.

Poole station is 113 miles 62 chains (183.1 km) from London Waterloo. The Engineers line reference code for the line is BML2.

Under the station name signs on the platforms are additional boards informing passengers that Poole is the home of Bournemouth University, the main campus of which is located in the Talbot Village area of the borough. The signs replaced most of the ones displaying the Condor Ferries logo with information on alighting at the station for services to the Channel Islands, though some remain on the station building. The Condor signs, the original version of which were installed in 1997, were in place due to the Condor Ferries Rail/Sea through ticketing scheme which includes a taxi to the Harbour ferry port from Poole station.

There is no passenger service along the railway line linking Poole station with Poole Harbour ferry terminal; however, it is only a 15-minute walk and there is a regular bus service provided by Morebus to a stop close to the port (Routes 8/9).

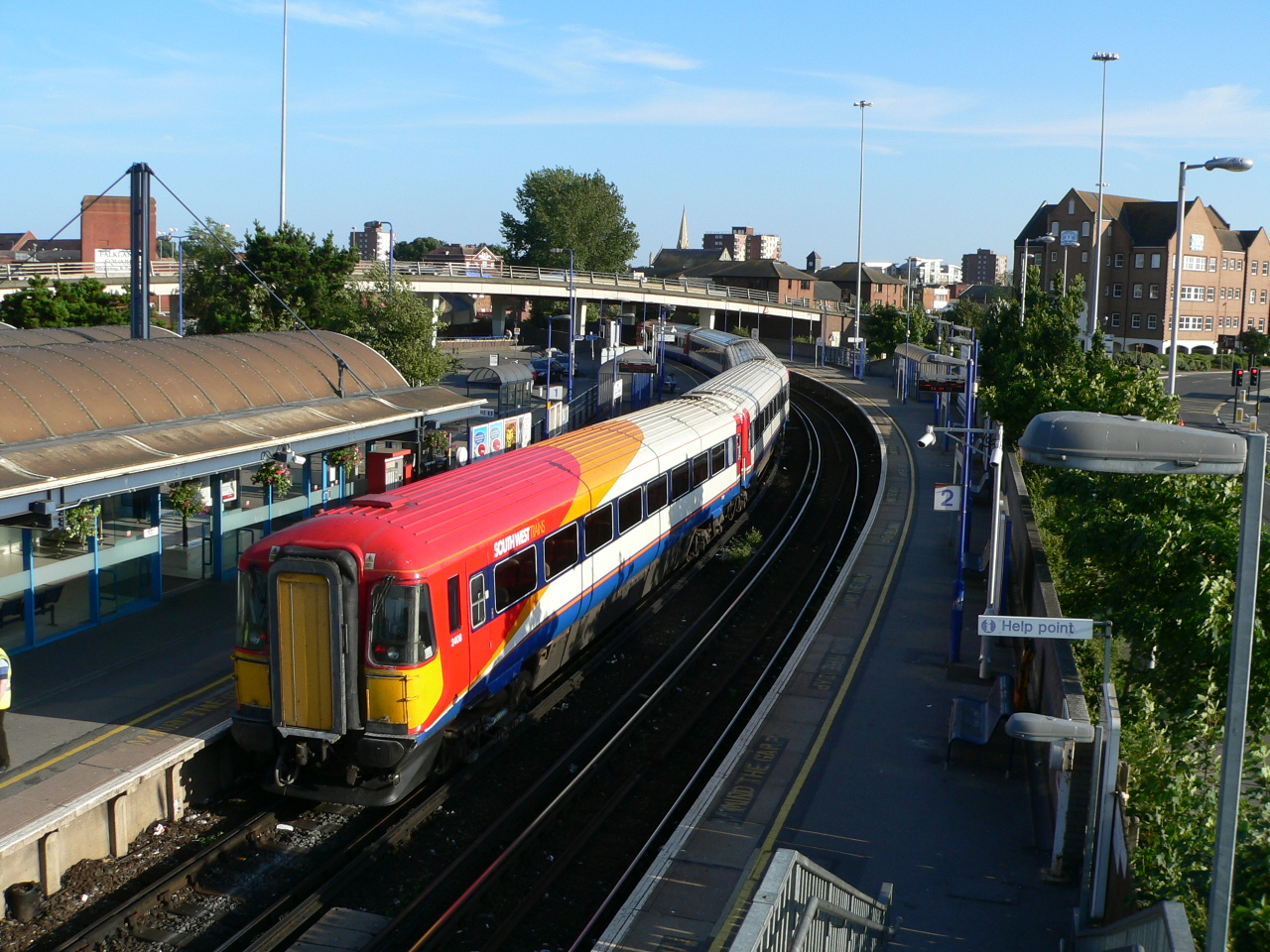
Looking eastwards from the footbridge

== Facilities ==
The station's facilities include:

- Ticket office (staffed seven days per week)
- Quick Ticket machines (self-service)
- Newsagent
- Photo booth
- Luggage trolleys
- Toilets
- Bicycle storage
- Taxi rank
- Bus stop
- Car park

Train running information is provided via digital information displays, timetable poster boards, customer help points and automated announcements. Step-free access is available to both platforms via a ramped underpass.

== Service ==
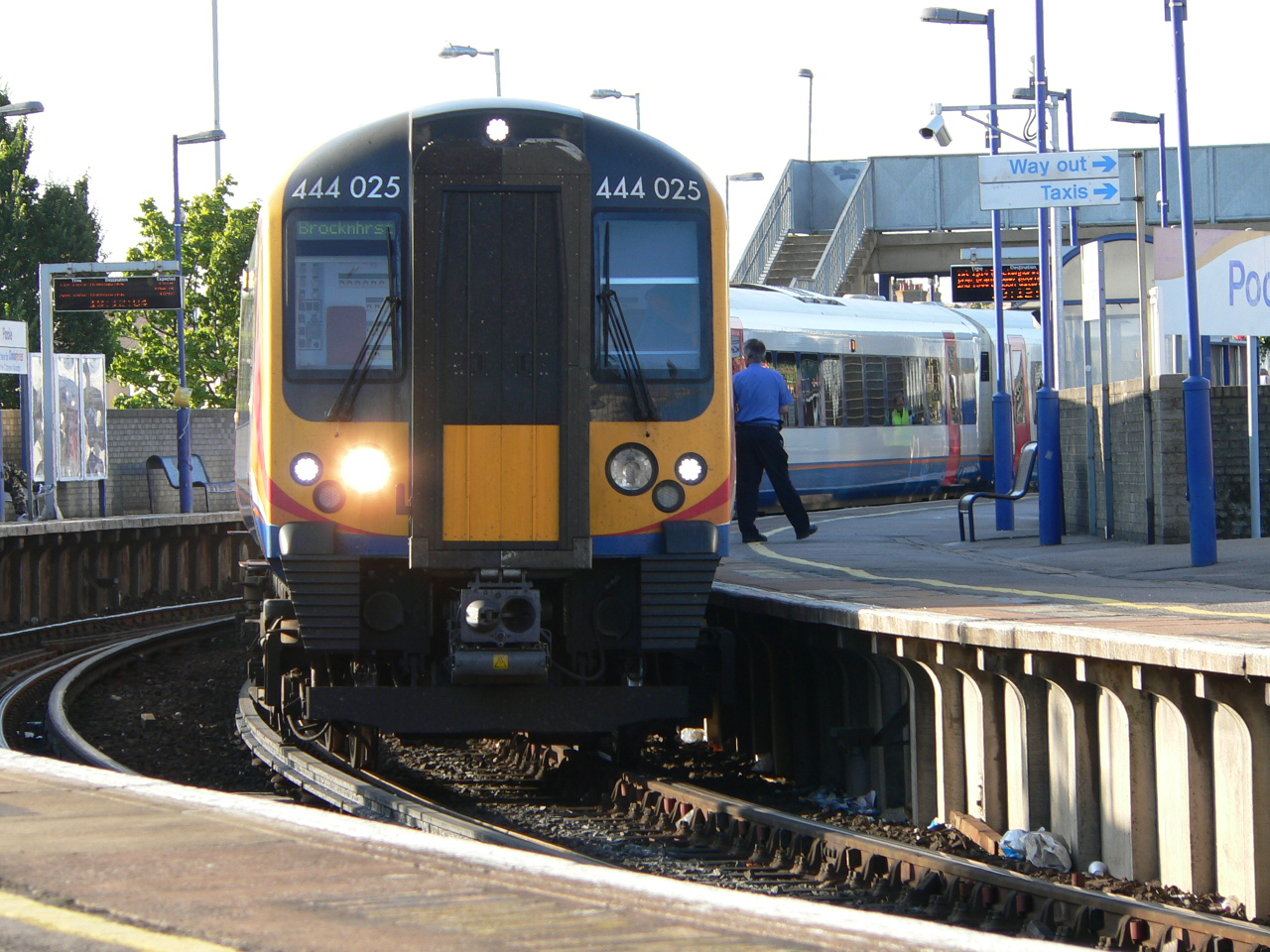
A South West Trains Class 444 forming a London service

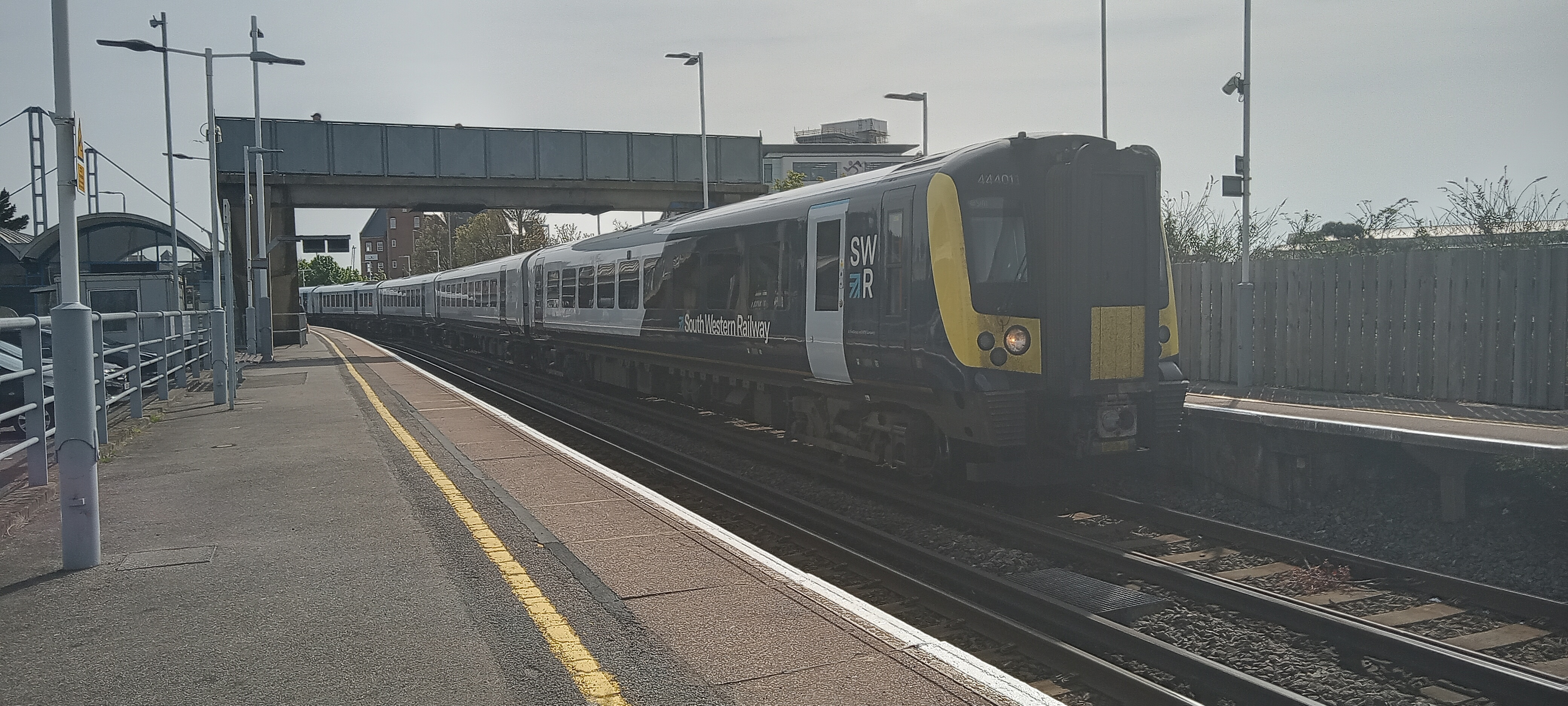
A South Western Railway Class 444 at Poole station on platform 2, operating a service to Weymouth

The station is served by South Western Railway, which provides the following typical off-peak stopping pattern, in trains per hour:

- 2 tph to Weymouth
- 3 tph to London Waterloo (two of these call at all stations to Bournemouth and one runs non-stop to Bournemouth and attaches to one of the stopping services there).

On Sundays, the service to London Waterloo is reduced to 2 tph and the service to Weymouth is reduced to hourly.

Preceding station	National Rail	Following station
Parkstone or Bournemouth	South Western Railway; South West Main Line	Hamworthy
	Disused railways	
Parkstone	Somerset & Dorset Joint Railway; LSWR and Midland Railways	Creekmoor Halt
	Ferry services	
Terminus (Poole Harbour)	Brittany Ferries; Ferry	Cherbourg; Maritime
Terminus (Poole Harbour)	Brittany Ferries high-speed catamaran	St Peter Port
Terminus (Poole Harbour)	Brittany Ferries high-speed catamaran	Saint-Malo
Terminus (Poole Harbour)	DFDS Seaways high-speed catamaran	St Helier

This station offers access to the South West Coast Path
Distance to path	4 miles (plus ferry)
Next station clockwise	Swanage 12 miles total
