= Burnham-on-Sea =

Town in Somerset, England

Coordinates: 51°14′16″N 2°59′56″W

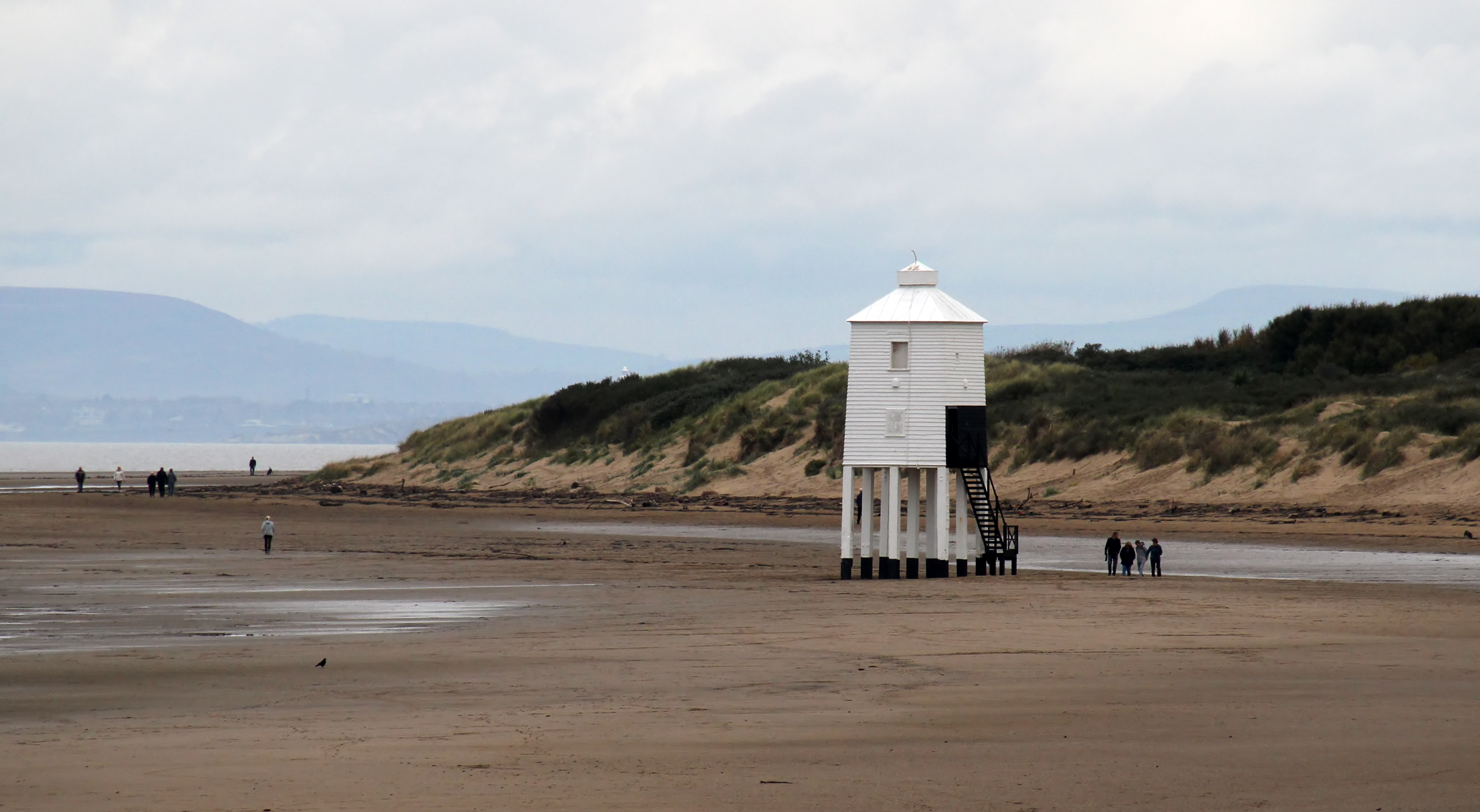
- The beaches and low wooden pile lighthouse

- Location within Somerset
- Population: 16,320 (2021 census)
- OS grid reference: ST306492
- Civil parish: Burnham-on-Sea and Highbridge
- Unitary authority: Somerset Council
- Ceremonial county: Somerset
- Region: South West
- Country: England
- Sovereign state: United Kingdom
- Post town: Burnham-on-Sea
- Postcode district: TA8
- Dialling code: 01278
- Police: Avon and Somerset
- Fire: Devon and Somerset
- Ambulance: South Western
- UK Parliament: Bridgwater

Burnham-on-Sea is a seaside town in Somerset, England, at the mouth of the River Parrett, on Bridgwater Bay. Burnham was a small fishing village until the late 18th century when it began to grow because of its popularity as a seaside resort.

Burnham-on-Sea forms part of the parish of Burnham-on-Sea and Highbridge and shares a town council with the neighbouring small market town of Highbridge, with which it has become a contiguous built-up area. At the 2021 census the population of Burnham-on-Sea (which the Office for National Statistics defines as that part of the built-up area west of Pepperall Road and Newtown Lake) was 16,320.

Burnham-on-Sea is famous for its low lighthouse. The lighthouse was built in 1832 and is a grade II listed building with a red and white striped facade.

The position of the town on the edge of the Somerset Levels and moors where they meet the Bristol Channel, has resulted in a history dominated by land reclamation and sea defences since Roman times. Burnham was seriously affected by the Bristol Channel floods of 1607, with the present curved concrete wall being completed in 1988. There have been many shipwrecks on the Gore Sands, which lie just offshore and can be exposed at low tides. Lighthouses are hence prominent landmarks in the town, with the original lighthouse known as the Round Tower built to replace the light on the top of the 14th-century tower of St Andrew's Church. The 110-foot (34-metre) pillar or High Lighthouse and the low wooden pile lighthouse or lighthouse on legs on the beach were built to replace it. The town's first lifeboat was provided in 1836 by the Corporation of Bridgwater.

== History ==
The name Burnham is derived from Burnhamm, as it was called in the will of King Alfred, made up from the Old English words burna meaning stream and hamm for enclosure. On-Sea was added later as there are several other towns of the same name in England.

The history of Burnham-on-Sea is the history of the reclamation of the Somerset Levels from the River Severn and the Bristol Channel. The Romans were the first peoples to try to reclaim the Somerset levels, and it was their people who were probably the first settlers in the high sand dunes behind the River Parrett. This could have been in part to maintain navigational systems, to aid ships entering the River Parrett and what is now Highbridge. When the Romans left, the system of drainage they installed was not maintained, and the areas reverted to become a tidal salt flat during the Anglo Saxon period.

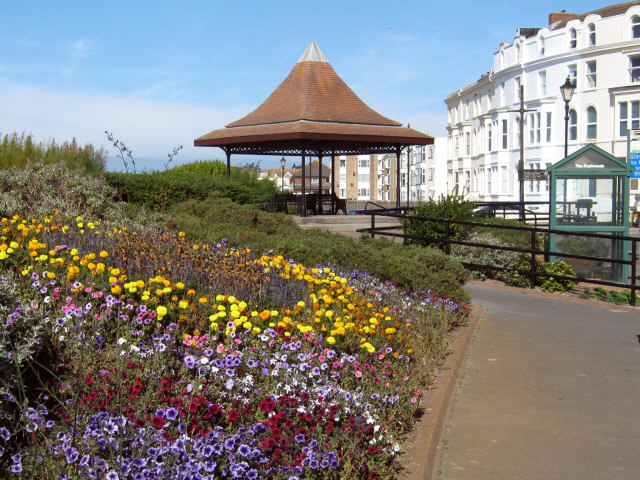
Bandstand on the Esplanade, 2009

It is likely that at the time of the Norman Domesday book, settlements existed at Burnham and Huntspill, their common boundary running along what is now the Westhill Rhyne. The church at Burnham and its lands were given to Gloucester Abbey in the 12th century, later transferred to Wells Cathedral along with up to 50 houses surrounding the church.

One of the earliest recorded incidents to affect the town was the Bristol Channel floods of 1607, since when various flood defences have been installed. In 1911 a concrete wall was built. After the Second World War, further additions to the defences against the sea were added by bringing part of the remains of a Mulberry harbour used for the Normandy Landings, and burying them in the sand. Today the town is defended from flooding by a large curved concrete wall, completed in 1988 following serious flooding in 1981. The wall runs along the Esplanade, and serves as the canvas for a wide variety of graffiti and street art.

USS Aulick was a Clemson-class destroyer in the United States Navy built in 1918 to 1919. In 1940 she was transferred to the British under the agreement with the United Kingdom exchanging American destroyers for bases in the Atlantic. She transferred to the Royal Navy where she served as HMS Burnham (H82) during the Second World War. In 1942, Burnham was formally adopted by Burnham-on-Sea. In 1944, she was used on aircraft training duties in the Western Approaches Command, which allowed a contingent from the ship to visit the town and march through its streets. Burnham was reduced to reserve at Milford Haven, Wales, in November 1944. She was ultimately scrapped at Pembroke Dock, in December 1948.

== Geography ==
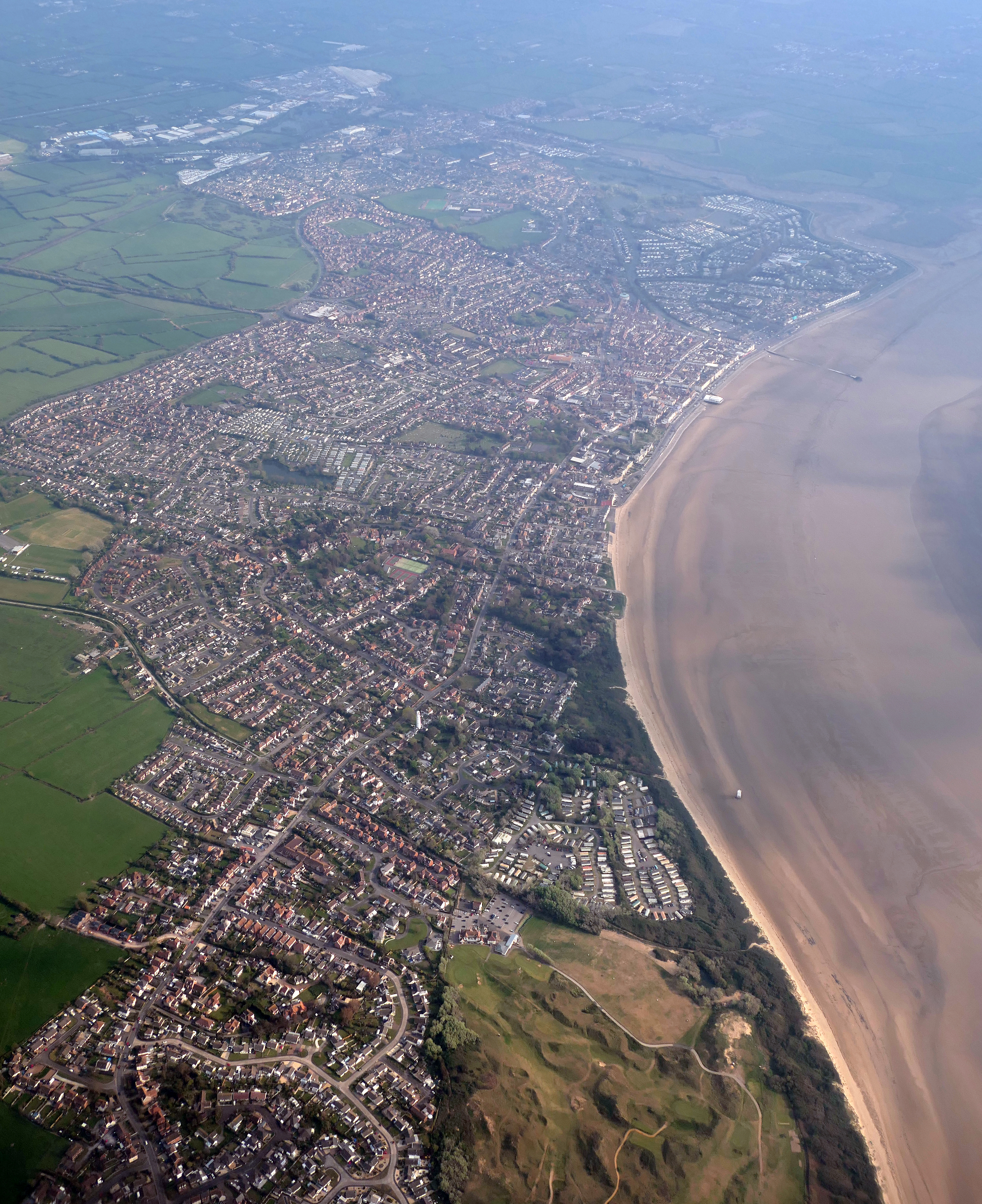
Aerial view of Burnham-on-Sea

Burnham-on-Sea is notable for its beach and mudflats, the danger they pose to individuals and shipping, and the efforts to which locals have gone in defending their town and preventing loss of life. Burnham is close to the estuary of the River Parrett where it flows into the Bristol Channel, which has the second highest tidal range in the world. At 11 m (36 ft), it is second only to the Bay of Fundy in Eastern Canada. Burnham's extensive mud flats are characteristic of Bridgwater Bay and the rest of the Bristol Channel, where the tide can recede for over 1.5 miles (2.4 kilometres). Bridgwater Bay consists of large areas of mudflats, saltmarsh, sandflats and shingle ridges, some of which are vegetated. It has been designated as a Site of Special Scientific Interest since 1989, and is designated as a wetland of international importance under the Ramsar Convention.

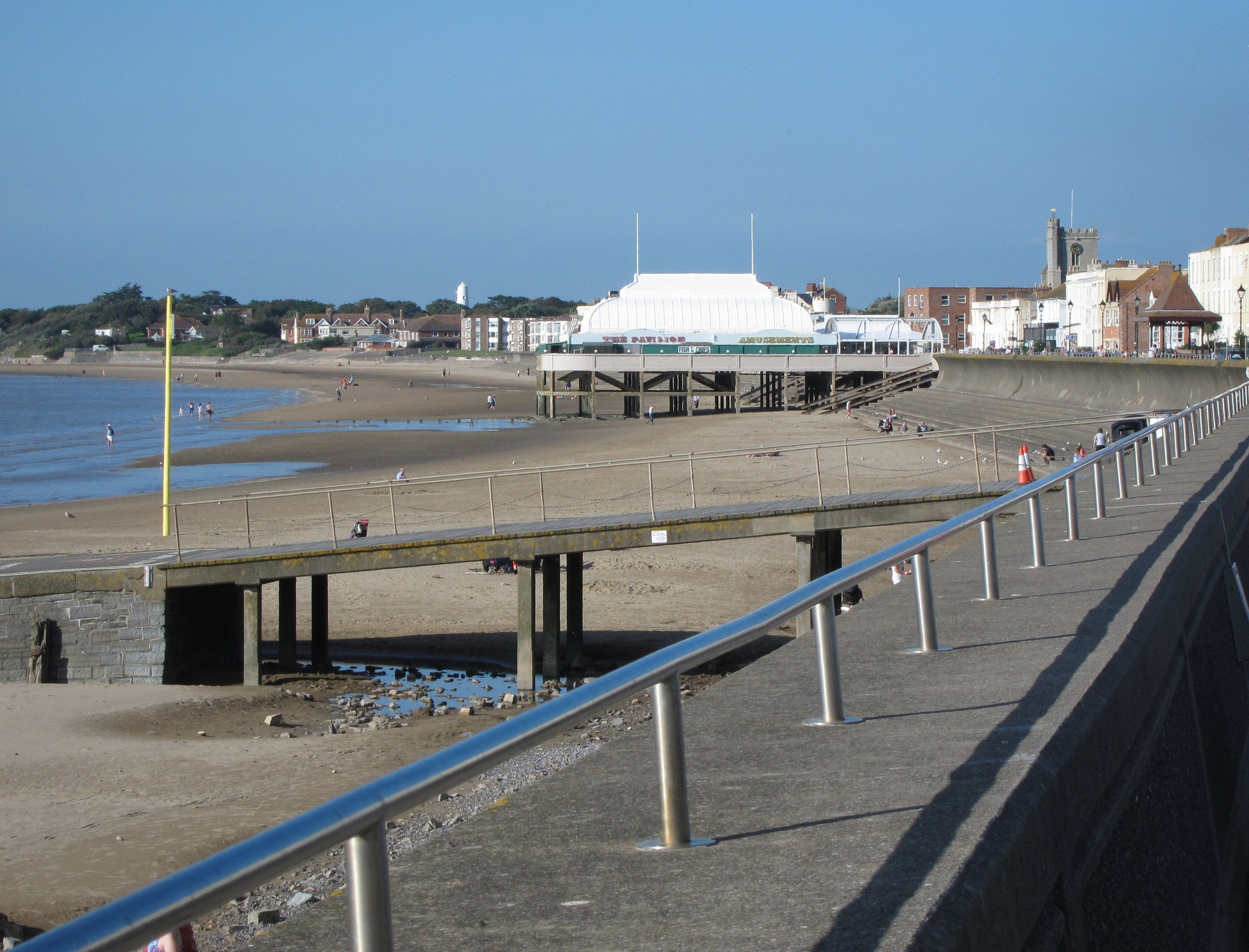
The beach and pier, 2016

Apex Leisure and Wildlife Park, in the south-west corner of Burnham-on-Sea, north of the River Brue, occupies an area of more than 42 acres (17 hectares). The park was created from excavated clay pits, which were flooded, and the lakes are now home to many types of wildlife and leisure activities.

Hinkley Point is a headland extending into Bridgwater Bay 5 miles (8 km) west of Burnham-on-Sea, one the opposite side the mouth of the River Parrett. The landscape of Hinkley Point is dominated by two closed nuclear power stations: Hinkley Point A and Hinkley Point B, and Hinkley Point C, which is under construction.

=== Climate ===
Along with the rest of South West England, Burnham has a temperate climate which is generally wetter and milder than the rest of the country. The annual mean temperature is approximately 10 °C (50 °F). Seasonal temperature variation is less extreme than most of the United Kingdom because of the adjacent sea temperatures. The summer months of July and August are the warmest with mean daily maxima of approximately 21 °C (70 °F). In winter, mean minimum temperatures of 1 or 2 °C (34 or 36 °F) are common. In the summer the Azores high pressure affects the south-west of England, however convective cloud sometimes forms inland, reducing the number of hours of sunshine. Annual sunshine rates are slightly less than the regional average of 1,600 hours. Most of the rainfall in the south-west is caused by Atlantic depressions or by convection. Most of the rainfall in autumn and winter is caused by the Atlantic depressions, which is when they are most active. In summer, a large proportion of the rainfall is caused by sun heating the ground leading to convection and to showers and thunderstorms. Average rainfall is around 700 mm (28 in). About 8–15 days of snowfall is typical. November to March have the highest mean wind speeds, and June to August have the lightest winds. The predominant wind direction is from the south-west.

=== Sea defences ===
Burnham was seriously affected by the Bristol Channel floods of 1607, and various flood defences have been installed since then. In 1911, a concrete sea wall was built, and after World War II further additions to the defences were made using the remains of a Mulberry harbour.

On 13 December 1981, a large storm hit the North Somerset coast. Meteorological conditions resulted in a very intense secondary low-pressure area moving rapidly at 40 knots (74 km/h; 46 mph) into the Bristol Channel, with pressure dropping from 1,012 to 962 hectopascals (29.9 to 28.4 inches of mercury) between 00:00 and 18:00. This caused a large rising surge in sea level, with the maximum surge at Hinkley Point measured at 1.3 m (4 ft 3 in) above the 7.4 m (24 ft 3 in) tidal level Ordnance Datum (OD) at 20:25, and 1.3 m (4 ft 3 in) measured at Avonmouth. The wind was measured at 40 knots (74 km/h; 46 mph) from the west. Over topping of the sea defences along a 7 mi (11 km) stretch of the Somerset coast at 22 locations from Clevedon to Porlock began after 19:30, and continued until about 21:30 when the wind speed had reached 50 knots (93 km/h; 58 mph) from the west. Although there was no loss of life, the resultant flooding covered 12,500 acres (5,100 ha) of land, affecting 1,072 houses and commercial properties, with £150,000 worth of livestock killed and £50,000 of feed and grain destroyed. Wessex Water Authority estimated the total cost of the damage caused at £6 million. This resulted in a three-year programme of sea defence assessment, repair and improvement.

Burnham, being the largest occupied town within the 1981 surge affected area, also bore the brunt of the resultant damage. 400 properties were affected, with pavements, stone and concrete from the sea wall ripped up and the Esplande destroyed; total damage within the parish was estimated at £1.5 million. Although emergency repairs were undertaken, Wessex Water Authority began planning new sea defences for the town. Construction work started in 1983 on a £7 million scheme, creating what was then Britain's biggest wave return wall. The scheme raised the level of the sea wall and the promenade by 1 m (3 ft 3 in), by creating a 1.6 km (0.99 mi) long and 3.2 m (10 ft 6 in) high sea wall, and a new wider Esplanade. Taking five years to complete and coming into operation in 1988, beach access is now via a series of raised steps for visitors, with three vehicle access points which can be closed during storms using sealed gates.

=== Lifeboats and BARB ===
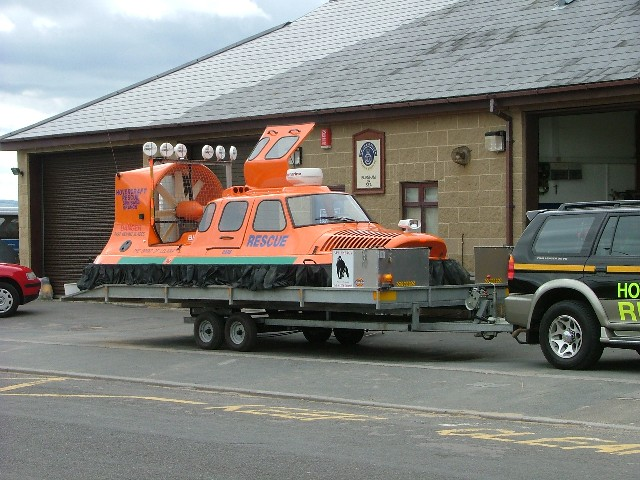
BARB rescue hovercraft Spirit of Lelaina

There have been many shipwrecks on the Gore Sands. The first lifeboat was sent to Burnham by Bridgwater Corporation in 1836, and a replacement boat in 1847.

The first Royal National Lifeboat was funded by the town of Cheltenham, and arrived in 1866. The lifeboat was removed in 1930 because of the difficulty in getting a full crew, and because the launching arrangements were not suitable for a powered boat. The current Burnham-on-Sea Lifeboat Station is the base for Royal National Lifeboat Institution (RNLI) search and rescue operations. The present station was opened in 2003. It operates two inshore lifeboats (ILBs), a B Class rigid-hulled boat and an inflatable D Class.

The Burnham-on-Sea Area Rescue Boat now known as BARB Search & Rescue was set up in 1992 to fund and operate rescue craft in the Bridgwater Bay area. BARB's boat house on the sea front was built in 1994 by the Challenge Anneka TV show. In 2002, Lelaina Hall, a five-year-old girl from Worcester, died on the mud flats before help could reach her. The outcry over her death prompted a Western Daily Press campaign to fund an inshore hovercraft. BARB currently operates the Spirit of Lelaina alongside her sister hovercraft the Light of Elizabeth, which is named after Lelaina's sister.

== Governance ==
There are two tiers of local government covering Burnham-on-Sea, at parish (town) and unitary authority level: Burnham-on-Sea and Highbridge Town Council and Somerset Council. The town council is based at the Old Courthouse on Jaycroft Road in Burnham-on-Sea.

For national elections, Burnham-on-Sea forms part of the Bridgwater constituency.

=== Administrative history ===
Burnham was an ancient parish in the Bempstone hundred of Somerset. As well as Burnham itself, the parish included the parts of Highbridge north of the River Brue and rural areas to the east of Burnham, including the hamlet of Edithmead.

A local board district covering the western part of Burnham parish around Burnham itself was established in 1850, administered by an elected local board. Under the Local Government Act 1894, such districts were reconstituted as urban districts, and civil parishes were no longer allowed to straddle district boundaries. The part of the old Burnham parish outside the urban district therefore became a separate parish, which was named Highbridge. The Highbridge parish was short-lived; in 1896 a new Highbridge Urban District was created covering the built-up area of Highbridge, and the more rural part of the Highbridge parish became a separate parish called Burnham Without, having been part of Burnham parish prior to 1894.

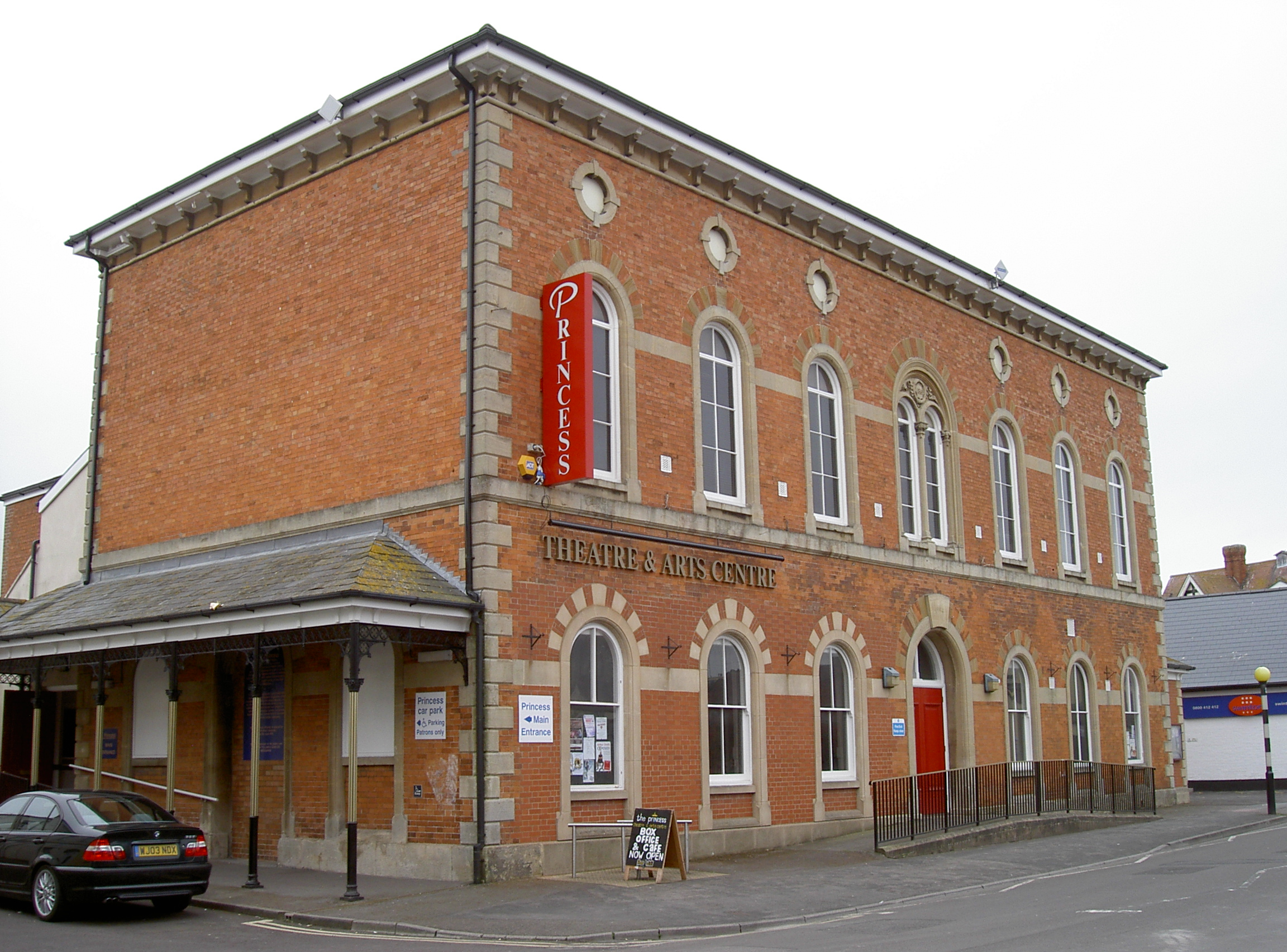
Princess Theatre and Arts Centre, formerly Town Hall

Burnham Urban District Council acquired the Town Hall on Princess Street to serve as its meeting place and offices. It had been built by a private company in 1869 as the 'Town Hall and Market House'. After the urban district council's abolition in 1974, the Town Hall was converted into the Princess Theatre and Arts Centre.

Burnham Urban District was formally renamed Burnham-on-Sea Urban District in 1917, although the name of the civil parish it covered remained just Burnham at that point. The neighbouring Highbridge Urban District was abolished in 1933 and its area absorbed into the Burnham-on-Sea Urban District. As part of the 1933 reforms, the civil parishes within the enlarged urban district were merged into a single Burnham-on-Sea parish.

Burnham-on-Sea Urban District was abolished in 1974 under the Local Government Act 1972, with its area becoming part of the new Sedgemoor district. A successor parish called 'Burnham-on-Sea and Highbridge' was created covering the former urban district as part of the 1974 reforms, with its parish council taking the name Burnham-on-Sea and Highbridge Town Council.

Sedgemoor was abolished in 2023. Somerset County Council then took over district-level functions across its area, making it a unitary authority, and was renamed Somerset Council.

== Landmarks ==
=== Lighthouses ===
Because of its position near the mouth of the River Parrett, and the constantly shifting sands of the Bristol Channel, there has always been a significant risk to shipping in the area. As a result, several lighthouses, have been built.

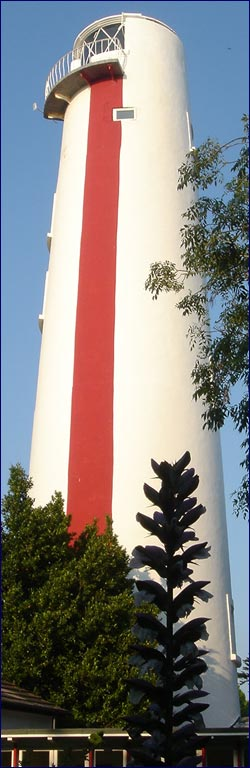
High Lighthouse

The original lighthouse, known as the Round Tower, was built after the local vicar, either John Goulden in 1764 or Walter Harris in 1799, raised a subscription amongst the local population to replace the light on the top of St Andrew's Church tower. The four-storey Round Tower was built next to the church. It was taken over and improved by Trinity House in 1815, and operated until 1832, following which the top two storeys were removed. The 110 ft (34 m) pillar or High Lighthouse was designed and built by Joseph Nelson for Trinity House in 1830, and equipped with a paraffin lamp. The ground floor was 5 m (16 ft 5 in) in diameter and the top room 3 m (9 ft 10 in). It was automated in 1920. In 1992, it was sold to a member of the Rothschild family, who owned it until 1996, when it was bought at auction by Patrick O'Hagan. Conversion for residential use included the removal of the 6th floor and the construction of stairs where there had previously only been ladders. It is a grade II listed building.

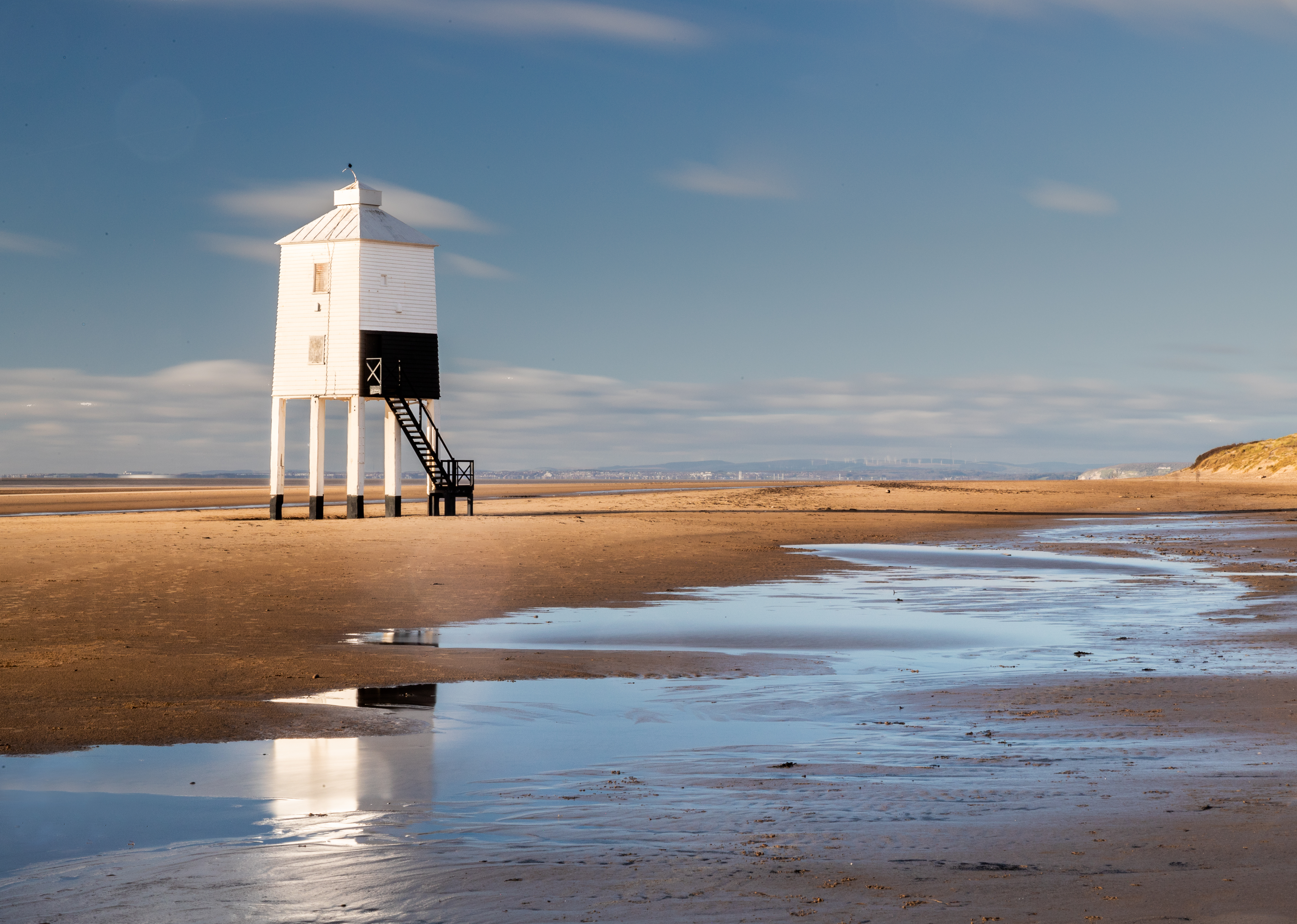
Low Lighthouse

The low wooden pile lighthouse or "lighthouse on legs", or "Nine Pins", was built two years later, also by Joseph Nelson, to complement the High Lighthouse. It is a total of 36 ft (11 m) high, with the light being at 23 ft (7.0 m) above the sand. It stands on nine wooden piers, some with plate metal reinforcement. The structure is whitewashed with a vertical red stripe on the sea side. The lights were inactive between 1969 and 1993, but were recommissioned when the High Lighthouse lights were permanently deactivated. They have a focal plane of 7 m (23 ft 0 in) and provide a white flash every 7.5 seconds, plus a directional light (white, red, or green depending on direction) at a focal plane of 4 m (13 ft 1 in).

=== Pier ===
Pier and Harbour Order Confirmation (No. 3) Act 1906
- Act of Parliament
- Parliament of the United Kingdom
- Long title: An Act to confirm a Provisional Order made by the Board of Trade under the General Pier and Harbour Act 1861 relating to Burnham in the county of Somerset.
- Citation: 6 Edw. 7. c. cxv

Dates
- Royal assent: 20 July 1906
Other legislation
Relates to	General Pier and Harbour Act 1861

Text of statute as originally enacted

Burnham (Somerset) Pier Act 1907
- Act of Parliament
- Parliament of the United Kingdom
- Long title: An Act to incorporate the Burnham (Somerset) Pier Company and to transfer to the Company the powers of the Burnham (Somerset) Pier Order 1906 to authorise the Barry Railway Company to subscribe to the capital of the Company and for other purposes.
- Citation: 7 Edw. 7. c. lxvi

Dates
- Royal assent: 26 July 1907

Text of statute as originally enacted

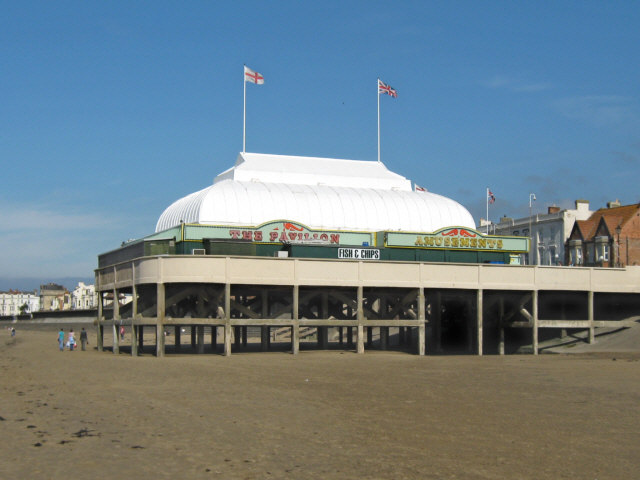
The UK's claimed shortest pier

A 900 ft (270 m) stone pier was erected in 1858 by the Somerset Central Railway, having been authorised by the Somerset Central Railway Act 1855 (18 & 19 Vict. c. clxxxii), with rails connecting to the nearby Burnham-on-Sea station. Soon afterwards, in 1860, a steamer service to Wales was inaugurated, but it was never a commercial success, and ended in 1888. The Somerset Central Railway had by now become the Somerset and Dorset Joint Railway, jointly owned by the London and South Western Railway and the Midland Railway, who decided to sell the pier. Transfer to the Burnham Investment Syndicate was authorised by the Burnham (Somerset) Pier Order 1906 confirmed by the Pier and Harbour Order Confirmation (No. 3) Act 1906 (6 Edw. 7. c. cxv), and a year later a further transfer to the Burnham (Somerset) Pier Company was authorised by Burnham (Somerset) Pier Act 1907 (7 Edw. 7. c. lxvi). The Barry Railway was an investor in this company, and became to operate a steam-ship service from Burnham to Barry Island, but it was also unsuccessful and ceased by 1910.

The pier retains its railway lines under a surface coating of concrete. It is now owned by the local council.

The concrete pier, built in 1911–1914, is claimed to be the shortest pier in Britain. However it is merely a beach pavilion, and is thus discounted by many pier experts. In 2008, it was rated amongst the top five piers in Britain by the Daily Express.

=== The Royal Clarence Hotel ===
The hotel was built in 1796 and incorporated the first bar in Burnham-on-Sea.

=== Listed buildings ===
The Esplanade along the sea front contains several listed buildings from the early 19th century, including number 44, which is also known as Steart House, and numbers 46 and 47.

On Berrow Road, near the High Lighthouse, numbers 4, 6 and 8 were part of a terrace built between 1838 and 1841. Number 31 was previously a lodge. On the corner of Berrow Road and Sea View is a drinking fountain from 1897 with a single dressed stone pier and moulded plinth, topped by a cast iron urn. Each side has the lions head design with those on the north and south sides giving water into a Purbeck Marble bowl.

== Education ==
Primary schools in the town providing education for children up to the age of 11 include: Berrow Church of England Primary School, Burnham-on-Sea Community Infants School, St Andrew's Church of England Junior School, St Joseph's Catholic Primary School and Nursery.

The nearest secondary school is The King Alfred School, a coeducational comprehensive school located in Highbridge. The school is a specialist sports college. In 2007, the school celebrated its 50th anniversary. The facilities of the dual-use King Alfred Sports Centre, which is next to the school site, are shared between the school and town.

== Religious sites ==
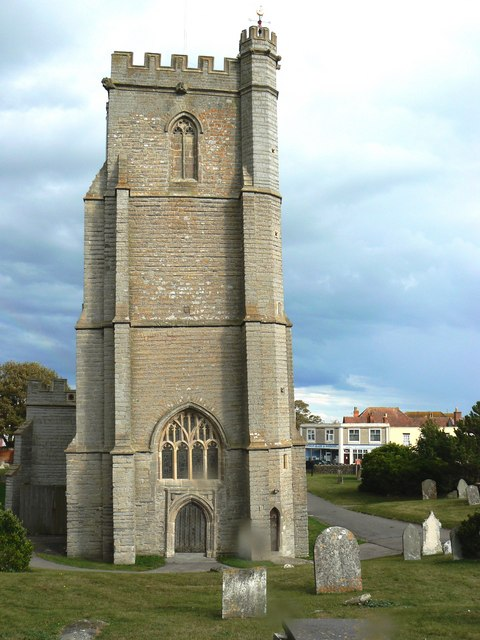
St Andrew's Church

The parish church, St. Andrew's, is a grade I listed building dating from the 14th century. It has a 78 ft (24 m) high tower, which leans significantly from the vertical, caused by its poor foundations. During the 18th century, a light was placed on the tower to guide fishing boats into the harbour. The church contains a number of marble carvings designed by Sir Christopher Wren for the private chapel in the Palace of Westminster.

There are also places of worship for Baptists, Methodists, Roman Catholics and Jehovah's Witnesses in the town. There is also an unofficial mosque in the community centre to hold prayer during Jummah and festivals like Eid-ul-Adha, otherwise the nearest official mosque would be in Weston-super-Mare.

== Transport ==
Burnham-on-Sea railway station was the terminus of the Burnham branch of the Somerset and Dorset Joint Railway, but the tracks continued onto the jetty, where ferry services to South Wales could be boarded. The station opened in 1858 as Burnham, and was renamed Burnham-on-Sea in 1920. It closed to scheduled passenger traffic in 1951 and stopped being used for excursions in 1962. It finally closed to goods traffic in 1963.

The former Great Western Railway station is now known as Highbridge and Burnham. The station was opened as "Highbridge" on 14 June 1841, when the Bristol and Exeter Railway opened its broad gauge line as far as Bridgwater. A road crossed the line at the north end of the platforms, and a goods shed was provided beyond this on the west side of the line. The Bristol and Exeter Railway amalgamated with the Great Western Railway on 1 January 1876.

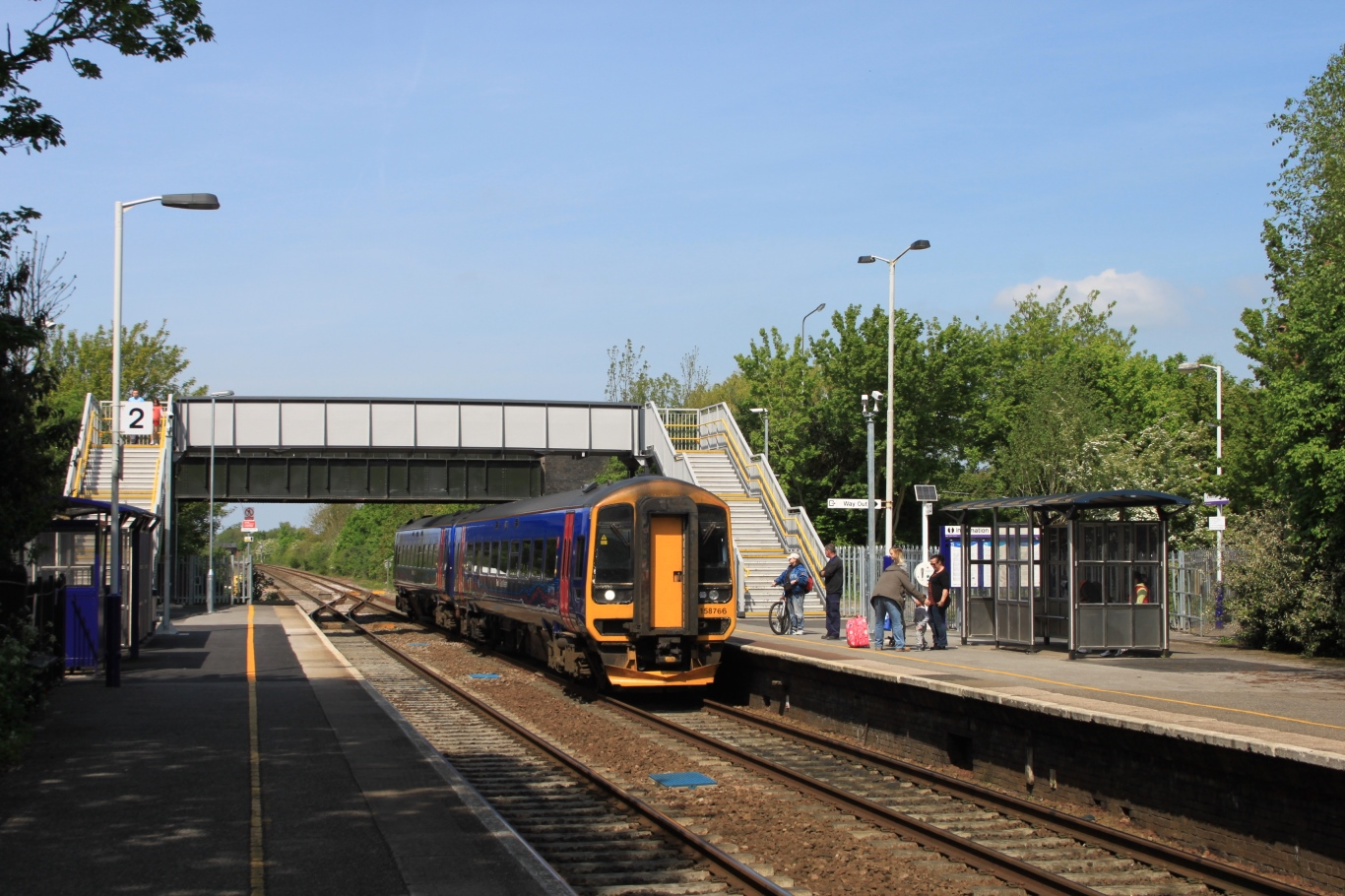
Highbridge & Burnham station on the Bristol to Exeter line

The town is approximately 3 mi (5 km) from the M5 motorway and the A38 road.

There are two main bus routes serving Burnham-on-Sea. These are service 21A from Taunton operated by The Buses of Somerset and service 20 from Weston-super-Mare operated by First West of England.

== Culture and sport ==
The town is part of the West Country Carnival circuit.

Burnham and Berrow Golf Course lies at the North of the town and is a 36-hole championship.

Burnham-on-Sea is a noted venue for kitesurfing, as well as other water sports, and has its own sailing club.

Land side many activities cater for either the dominant resident elderly population or the seasonal tourists, including bowls, and there is also a swimming pool and sports academy.

The Burnham-on-Sea rugby union club was formed in 1887. It was wound up after World War 2 and subsequently reformed. After winning the Tribute Somerset Premier in the 2008–09 they were promoted to the Western Counties North rugby union league.

The Burnham-on-Sea cricket club was established in 1861 and has played continuously since then. They currently play in the Somerset Cricket League Premier Div. The ground is in Stoddens Road and boasts fine facilities. The best-known player in the club's history is Sammy Woods, who played Test cricket for England and Australia during the 1890s. The club has also provided a number of players for Somerset in the County Championship competition.

In 2016 the town held the Burnham Spray Jam which decorated the streets with artwork from John D'Oh, Andrew Burns Colwill, SPZERO, Irony, Cheba, Diff, Angus, The Agent, Miss Wah, 23 Magpies, Korp and many others. This year the Spray Jam has been incorporated into BOSfest which will also include music, poetry and street entertainment.

The town is home to multi-award-winning eat:Festivals, who organise three food and drink festivals in this town and in 9 other Somerset towns.

== Notable residents ==
- Fanny Trevor (c.1818–1904), educator, the first college principal of Bishop Otter College.
- Charles Brooke, Rajah of Sarawak (1829–1917), the head of state of Sarawak, 1868 until his death.
- Thomas Alan Stephenson (1898–1961), a marine biologist, he specialised in sea anemones.
- Isobel English (1920–1994), a novelist who wrote Every Eye, attended La Retraite, a Burnham-on-Sea convent school, in 1928.
- John Pople (1925–2004), theoretical chemist who won the Nobel Prize in Chemistry in 1925.
- George Shelley (born 1993) of X Factor boy band Union J lived locally and attended The King Alfred School, Highbridge.

=== Sport ===
- Ernest Whitcombe (1890–1971), Charles Whitcombe (1895–1978) & Reg Whitcombe (1898–1957) were golfing brothers, all three played together for Great Britain in the 1935 Ryder Cup.
- Arthur Gilbert (1921–2015), the world's oldest competing triathlete in 2011, lived and competed in the town.
- Gary Anderson (born 1970), has been world champion Scottish darts player, he lives locally.
- Sara Jane Cox-Conklin (born 1964) is a former British modern pentathlete and professional triathlete, Triathlon World Amateur Age Group Champion (1994), and winner of the British Championships in Modern Pentathlon (1990).

== Twin towns ==
Burnham-on-Sea is twinned with Cassis in France, and Fritzlar in Germany.
