= Apex Leisure and Wildlife Park =

Park and wildlife centre in Somerset, England

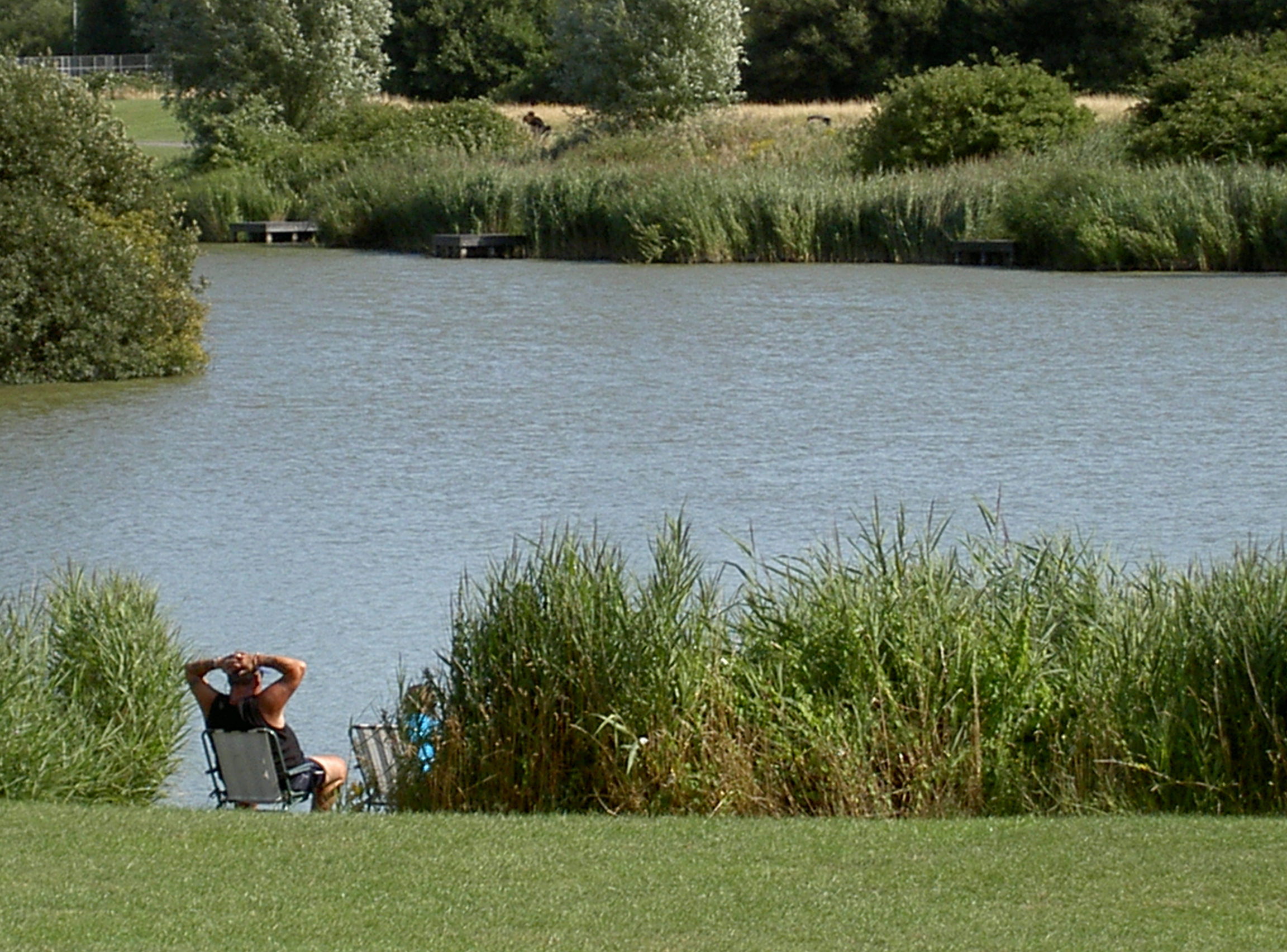
- Interactive map of Apex Leisure and Wildlife Park
- Type: Urban Park
- Location: Highbridge, Somerset, England
- Coordinates: 51.2242°N 2.9959°W
- Area: 42 acres (17 ha)
- Operator: Somerset Council
- Open: All year

Apex Leisure and Wildlife Park is an urban park and wildlife centre in Highbridge, Somerset, England. The park was created on the site of a former clay pit and brickwork manufacturing site and provides a link between Highbridge and Burnham-on-Sea. There are various facilities including an outdoor gym, a lake and birdlife.

== History ==
In the 19th and early 20th centuries clay was extracted for brick and tile making on the site. A railway line to Burnham-on-Sea ran along the current north-eastern part of the park. A brickworks manufacturing bricks, roof tiles and pipes operated on the site with four kilns. Manufacturing ceased in 1966 ending the brick and tile trade in the Highbridge area. In 1969 Burnham-on-Sea Urban District Council bought the land holding of "Colthurst Symonds & Co", including flooded clay pits, Apex being the name of the previous brick and tile company bought out by Colthurst Symonds. The clay pits were required for storm water drainage for the council's drainage scheme and this involved creating a link between the two towns via a public park. The clay pits were sculpted into one lake, during excavation an ordance dump of bombs, mines and grenades left by the Ministry of Defence during 1939 - 1945 was discovered and removed by the Explosive Ordance Royal Engineers. In 1972 drainage work began connecting an outfall pipe to the River Brue allowing a wider choice of recreation for the public.

== Location ==
The park straddles both Highbridge and adjacent Burnham-on-Sea, it is listed as Apex Wildlife and Leisure Park, Highbridge on the Somerset Council website. The park runs along the River Brue.

== Facilities ==
There is a children's play area, a cafe, a lake, toilets, picnicking, a skate park, an outdoor gym with a cross trainer, arm pull down, chest press, seated rower, shoulder press, spinning bike and leg press. There are model boating facilities and a BMX track. Burnham and Highbridge Parkrun takes place every Saturday morning at 9am. The area covered is 42 acres (17 ha).

== Nature ==
There are semi-natural habitats with lake, reed bed, scrub, woods, wildflower and grassland used by a wide range of plants and birds. Water birds spotted include mute swans, cormorants, pochard ducks and tufted ducks, coots, Canada geese and moorhens.
