= Burnham Pier =

Pleasure pier in Somerset, England

- Burnham Pier in 2026
- Type: Pleasure pier
- Coordinates: 51°14′13.7″N 2°59′57.8″W
- Owner: J. Holland and Sons

Characteristics
- Total length: 37 metres (121 ft)

History
- Opening date: 1914

Burnham Pier is a pleasure pier in Burnham-on-Sea in Somerset, England. Built in 1914, it measures 37 metres (121 ft) in length and has been described as the shortest pier in the United Kingdom. At low tide the pier is up to 1.5 miles (2.4 km) from the sea.

== Description ==
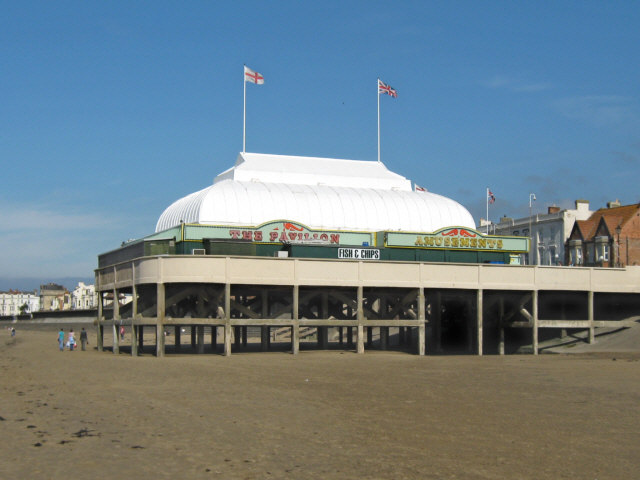
Burnham Pier in 2009

The pier was built in 1914, being finished shortly before the outbreak of the First World War in July. It is said to have been inspired by the works of Victorian engineer Isambard Kingdom Brunel and has been described as the first pier to be built of reinforced concrete rather than the steel and cast iron used previously. The pier measures 37 metres (121 ft) in length and has been described as the shortest pier in the United Kingdom, though some authorities do not classify it as a pier. The Bristol Channel has the second-highest tidal range in the world which means that at low tide the sea can be as far as 1.5 miles (2.4 km) from the pier. The pier is occupied by a building, known as the pavilion, which houses a 100-seat café, a bingo hall and an amusements arcade.

The Parkin family purchased the pier in 1968. In 2013 Sedgemoor District Council asked English Heritage to consider classifying the pier as a listed building but this was refused. In 2014 the Parkin family proposed a £100,000 refurbishment to mark the centenary of the pier. This consisted of a new seating area covered by a retractable 14-by-10-metre (46 ft × 33 ft) roof. The local planning officer recommended that permission not be granted for the new structure but district councillors decided to grant permission. The roof was completed in 2015.

In 2017 the pier was sold to J. Holland and Sons. In 2019 the building, formerly branded as "The Pavilion", was rebranded to "Burnham Pier" . A significant programme of repairs was completed in summer 2020.

The pier should not be confused with the 266-metre (873 ft) long Burnham-on-Sea railway pier, located a short distance to the south (51°14′04.8″N 3°00′09.7″W). This was built in 1858 by the Somerset Central Railway. It allowed railway carriages from the nearby Burnham-on-Sea railway station to access steamer services to Cardiff and Paris. It remains in use to launch the Burnham-on-Sea lifeboat.

== 2021 fire ==
On 5 August 2021, the pier suffered from a severe fire that began in a wood and refuse storage area at the seaward end of the pavilion. The fire was first reported at 12.30pm and eight fire crews from Avon Fire and Rescue Service and Devon and Somerset Fire and Rescue Service attended the blaze. It was extinguished by 2.30pm but left severe fire, smoke and water damage to around half of the building. The cause of the fire was not determined but it was not thought to be arson. The pier reopened to business on 8 August, though part of the structure was initially cordoned off for safety reasons.
