= Arthur Gilbert =

Arthur Gilbert may refer to:

- Arthur Gilbert (painter) (1819–1895), English landscape painter
- Arthur Hill Gilbert (1894–1970), American Impressionist painter
- Arthur Gilbert (politician) (1879–1932), Canadian member of Parliament
- Sir Arthur Gilbert (real estate developer) (1913–2001), British-born American real estate developer and philanthropist
- Arthur Gilbert (triathlete) (1921–2015), English triathlon competitor
- Stuart Gilbert (Arthur Stuart Ahluwalia Stronge Gilbert, 1883–1969). English literary scholar and translator
