= Sara Jane Cox-Conklin =

British athlete

Sara-Jane Cox-Conklin
- Amami Ladies International Triathlon, Japan
- Born: 23 April 1964 (age 62); Bridgwater, Somerset
- Citizenship: British
- Education: MA in clinical and experimental psychology
- Occupations: Pentathlete and professional triathlete

Sara Jane Cox-Conklin (born 23 April 1964) is a former British modern pentathlete and professional triathlete. She is known for her achievements across a wide variety of sports including Triathlon World Amateur Age Group Champion (1994), and winner of the British Championships in Modern Pentathlon (1990).

== Early life and education ==
Cox-Conklin was born on 23 April 1964, in Bridgwater, Somerset, England to Ann & David Cox. She grew up in the adjacent town of Burnham-on-Sea and swam for Burnham Swimming Club, winning her first medal in 1976. She attended Rossholme School King Alfred School 6th Form & Bridgwater College, pursuing her education in various fields. She completed O Levels in multiple subjects (1982) and obtained A levels in Law (Grade A) & Economics (1984) and an Advanced Secretarial Diploma (First Class). In 1992, she received Higher National Diploma in Business & Finance with Distinction at North East Worcester College, followed by an MA in General Psychology specialising in Clinical & Experimental Psychology . Later in 1998, he graduated with honour from the California Institute for Human Science.

== Corporate career and business ==
During the start of 2000s, Cox-Conklin worked at Microsoft Inc. as an associate program manager and executive assistant. In 2008, Cox-Conklin founded the Burnham-on-Sea Swim & Sports Academy.

== Career in sports ==
Cox-Conklin has participated in several competitions, including World Championships in locations such as Bensheim (1987), Warsaw (1988), Vienna (1989), Linköping (1990), Sydney (1991), Budapest (1992), Cancun (1995), Hawaii (1999), McCall (2008), Monaco (2009), and Falun (2010).

=== Modern pentathlon ===
Cox-Conklin was a member of the National Squad for eight years (1986–1993), representing Great Britain in European World Championship World Cup Events. She was the British champion and international champion in 1990 (Wantage) and was the runner-up in the British Championships in 1986. In addition, she won the Portuguese Open in 1987 and placed third in the Vienna International. In the same year and was a member of the 1st-place team. As a member of Team GB, she placed fifth in the San Antonio International Cup in Texas and sixth in the 1987 Royal Nordic Cup. At the 1988 World Championships her team placed 6th. In the 1992 World Team Championships the team placed 5th. In 1987, she won the 2,000 m cross-Country run in a Women’s International Modern Pentathlon Competition in Italy.

=== Triathlon ===
In 1995, Cox-Conklin became the ITU Triathlon World Amateur Age Group Champion. In the same year, she became the Southwest USA Regional Champion at Malibu Triathlon and won first place in the Carlsbad Triathlon and Do the Tri in Camp Pendleton California. In the following year, she won the European Triathlon Union Prestige Cup in Aegina Island, Greece, and Ardennes, France, as well as the FTF Select Race in Tours France. In addition, she was also the USA National Champion at the Pacific Grove Triathlon.

She secured several other international placements, including third in the Amami International in Japan, third in the International Women's Triathlon in Zurich, third in the Florida St. Augustine's Lighthouse International third in the SETRIC Cup Belgrade International and third in the Tahiti International. She placed seventh in the International Triathlon Union (ITU) New Zealand World Cup in 1996.

Later in 1999, Cox-Conklin ranked seventh in Professional Lake Placid Ironman, ninth in Austria, and twenty-eighth in the Hawaii World Championships. In 2005, she took first place at the Pacific Northwest Regional championships in Vashon Island, USA and placed 4th at Xterra Switzerland (2014), qualifying for the Xterra World Championships in Maui.

In 2010, she was the ITU Winter Triathlon World Cup & Pan American Champion by securing first place at Soldier Hollow. As of 2010, she has had over 28 wins around the world in her career as a professional triathlete.

=== Cross-country skiing ===
Cox-Conklin placed third at the USA Masters Nationals in Skiathlon and competed for the GB Masters team in three World Cups. She placed seventh in the Masters World Cup (30k Classic) in 2008 in McCall and tenth in the 30K Classic in Falun in 2010.

=== Biathle ===
In 2009, she placed third in the World Biathle Championships in Monaco, first in the Europa Cup in Italy, and was the GB National Series Champion, securing first place at Millfield, Weymouth, Portland, and Poole in the age group 45-49.

=== Modern biathlon (Run/Swim) ===
Cox-Conklin was the British Champion in 1985 and 2010. She became the first International Biathlon Champion in Corby in 1990.

=== Modern triathlon (Run/Swim/Shoot) ===
Cox-Conklin won the Team National Triathlon Championships at Crystal Palace in (1984) and won the Ladies Open Individual event at Southampton in 1986. She was the Southern Regional Individual Champion in 1989.

=== Tetrathlon (Run/Swim/Shoot/Fence) ===
Cox-Conklin achieved second place in the British Championships in 1988 (Yeovil). and 3rd Place in 1986. She was a member of the winning team at the British Championships in 1985 at Bracknell. She won the Ladies event at the Open Army Invitational in 1987.

=== Swimming ===
Cox-Conklin competed in the British Masters Championships in Swansea in 2014 at the age of 50-54, winning three bronze medals in the 100 and 200 Butterfly events & 200 Freestyle. In 2014, she placed first in the Chamonix Masters 50 Butterfly, second in the 100 Butterfly, and third in the 200 Individual Medley.

=== Open-water swimming ===
Cox-Conklin achieved first place at the inaugural Steart Island Swim (2000) & was third at the Traversee du Lac d’Annecy (2014).

=== Fencing ===
Cox-Conklin placed third in the National Epee Championships & Birmingham International Competition in 1993. She was part of the National Epee Squad from 1988 to 1989. She won the 1989 Aldershot Open Epee Championship and the 1985 Somerset & Dorset County Championships. She placed 2nd at the Slough Open (1989) and 2nd at the Clara Rayner Championships (1993). In 1985 she represented MPAGB against Hongkong & the Royal Navy where she placed 3rd.

=== Cross country running ===
Cox-Conklin was the South-West Cross Country Champion in 1983, winning first place in the Senior Ladies category in St Austell. In 1981, Cox-Conklin represented Somerset Senior Girls in the English Schools Cross Country Championships in Exeter.

=== Athletics - Track ===
Cox-Conklin won the South-West Inter Counties Athletics Championships in 1983 in the Senior Girls 1500 Meters Event. She also won the 1500 & 3000 M County Championships and in 1986 the 800 M County Championships. In 1984 she was selected to represent the South West Amateur Athletic Association in an inter-regional match in Wiltshire.

=== Road running ===
She won Age-group championships in England & the United States. Notably, The Ironman California 5K (2000) The Nisene Marks Marathon (2001), and the Run for Britain 6-mile event in Burnham-on-Sea (1984).

=== Duathlon (Bike/Run) ===
Cox-Conklin took first place at Lake Padden, Washington in 2005. In 1995 she achieved 4th place in the San Diego International Duathlon.

=== Tennis ===
She was the U18 County Doubles Somerset Champion (1981) and the Veterans Ladies Somerset Champion in 2008.

=== Golf ===
Cox-Conklin represented Somerset in the south west Seniors Inter-County Gross Team Championships (2023 & 2024). She has achieved three “hole-in ones” (2021, 2022 2024) & won the Somerset County Fowler Brooches Foursomes Stableford (2018 & 2019) & County Bowmaker (2023).

=== Superstars ===
Cox-Conklin won the King Alfred Sports Center Superstar championships three years in a row between 1983 – 1985).

== Recognition(s) ==
Cox-Conklin has received several awards throughout her career, including the California Distinguished Research Award for her master’s Thesis on the "Personality Profiles of Elite Endurance Athletes." the Microsoft Trustworthy Computing Outstanding Achievement Award, ASA Swim School of the Year (2012), Burnham & Highbridge Civic Award 2014.
