= Highbridge and Burnham railway station =

Railway station in Somerset, England

Highbridge & Burnham
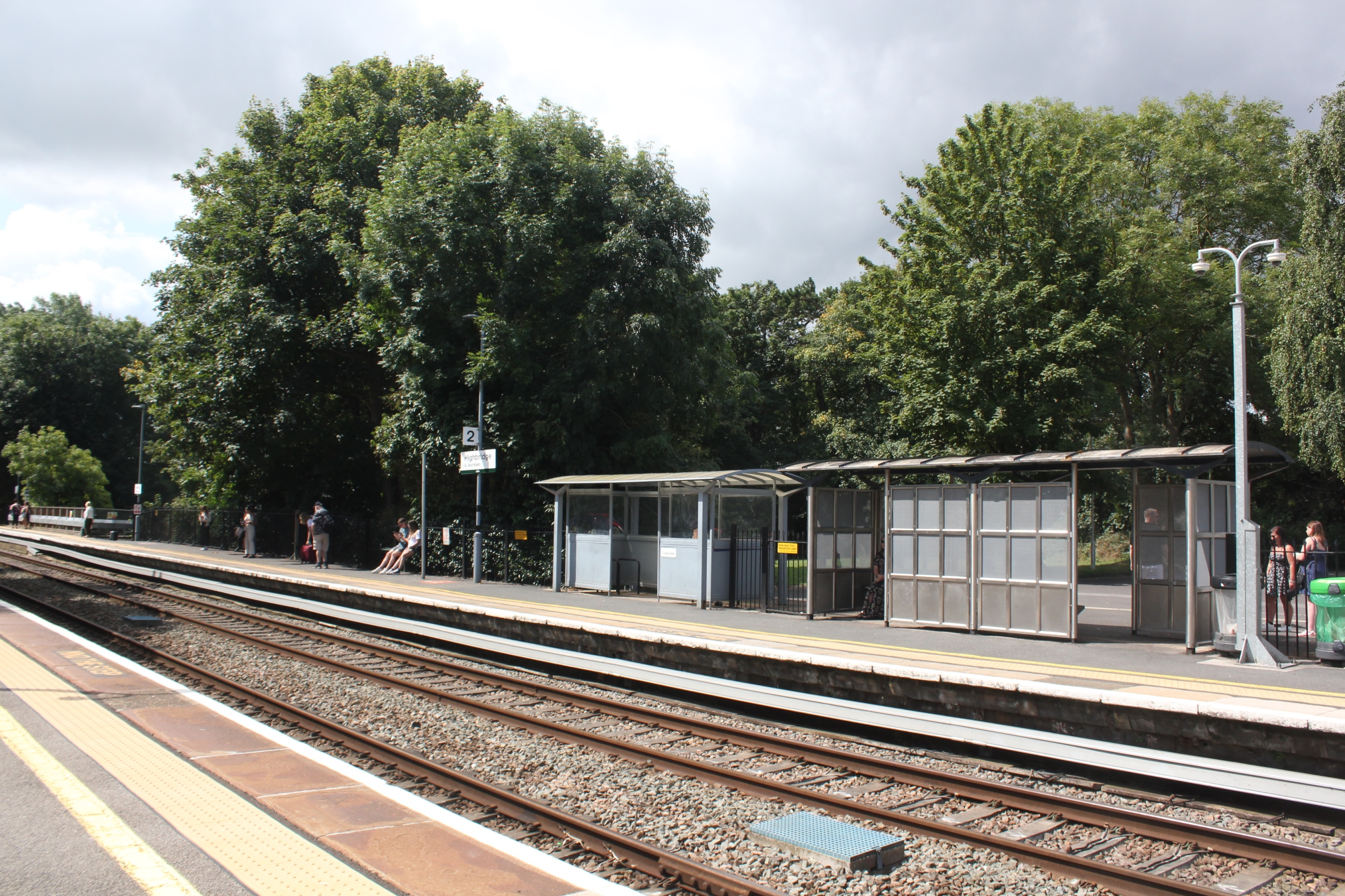

General information
- Location: Highbridge, Somerset; England
- Coordinates: 51.2184°N 2.9719°W
- Grid reference: ST322470
- Manager: Great Western Railway
- Platforms: 2

Other information
- Station code: HIG
- Classification: DfT category F1

History
- Original company: Bristol and Exeter Railway
- Pre-grouping: Great Western Railway
- Post-grouping: Great Western Railway

Key dates
- 1841: Main line opened
- 1854: Branch opened
- 1962: Renamed 'Highbridge & Burnham-on-Sea'
- 1966: S&DJR platforms closed
- 1974: Renamed 'Highbridge'
- 1991: Renamed 'Highbridge & Burnham'

Passengers
- 2021/22: ▲0.195 million
- 2022/23: ▲0.232 million
- 2023/24: ▼0.230 million
- 2024/25: ▲0.249 million
- 2025/26: ▲0.275 million
Location
Notes
- Passenger statistics from the Office of Rail and Road

Highbridge and Burnham railway station is situated on the Bristol to Exeter line in the town of Highbridge, Somerset and also serves the neighbouring town of Burnham-on-Sea. It is 145 miles 25 chains (145.31 mi; 233.9 km) from the zero point at London Paddington via Box. It is unstaffed but managed by Great Western Railway who operate all the regular services.

Until 1966 the station also had platforms on the Somerset and Dorset Joint Railway (S&DJR) line which crossed the main line on the level at the north end of the station.

== History ==
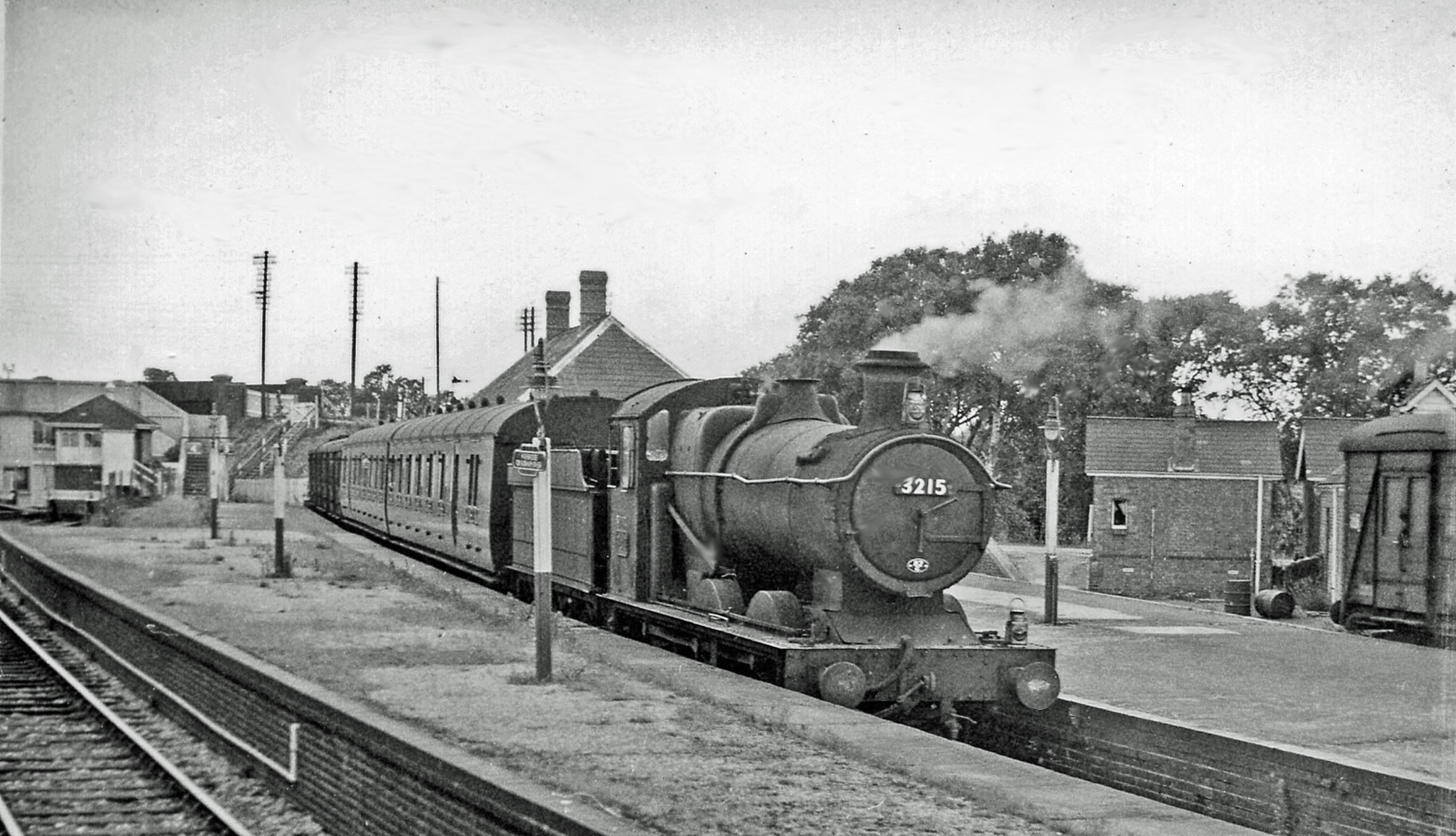
Somerset & Dorset platform in 1962

The station was opened as 'Highbridge' on 14 June 1841, when the Bristol and Exeter Railway (B&ER) engineered by Isambard Kingdom Brunel, opened its broad gauge line as far as Bridgwater. A road crossed the line at the north end of the platforms, and a goods shed was provided beyond this on the west side of the line.Cooke, RA (1979). Track Layout Diagrams of the GWR and BR WR, Section 16: West Somerset. Harwell: RA Cooke. The B&ER was amalgamated with the Great Western Railway (GWR) on 1 January 1876.

=== Somerset & Dorset Joint Railway ===
On 28 August 1854 the Somerset Central Railway was opened from Highbridge to Glastonbury. This later became the Somerset and Dorset Joint Railway (S&DJR), but it was worked by the Bristol and Exeter Railway (B&ER) company for the first few years and was broad gauge like the B&ER. A connection was provided between the two railways in the goods yard. Separate platforms were provided for the S&DJR line to the east of the B&ER platforms. These eventually consisted of two terminal platforms and two through platforms to service an extension line that continued via Highbridge Wharf (where most of the S&DJR goods traffic was also handled) and onwards to Burnham-on-Sea. To reach the extension, the S&DJR line crossed the B&ER main line on the level just north of the road bridge.

Highbridge was also the site of the S&DJR's locomotive works, which closed in 1930 after the motive power of the line was taken over by the London Midland and Scottish Railway (LMS), whilst its joint-venture owning partner the Southern Railway (SR) took over civil engineering and line operations. The associated small engine shed remained open until the line and station finally shut in 1966.

=== British Railways ===
Following the nationalisation of the railways, the former S&DJR line platforms were shown in timetables from 26 September 1949 as 'Highbridge East', and the B&ER/GWR line platforms were known as 'Highbridge West' from 5 May 1950. To allow access to all platforms at the station, the companies had jointly created a splayed-out footbridge design to span both the B&ER/GWR platforms, as well as the S&DJR platforms. BR civil engineers replaced this with a concrete footbridge in the 1950s.

Regular through trains to Burnham ceased on 29 October 1951, though the former extension line remained open for occasional summer special trains until 8 September 1962. Following this closure the station became 'Highbridge and Burnham-on-Sea' on 30 June 1962.

With the former S&DJR lines consolidated into the operations of the Western Region of British Rail, they were resultantly run down by the now controlling former-GWR staff. The remaining S&DJR line passenger services to Evercreech Junction were withdrawn on 7 March 1966, with only milk trains continuing to run on the former S&DJR line as far as Bason Bridge. A new connection from the southbound B&ER/GWR main line was installed 4 April 1971, to allow fly ash carrying trains to access the M5 motorway construction works across the Somerset levels, and thereby raise the motorway above the flooding point of the local water course. All trains were withdrawn and the stub of the former S&DJR line closed on 2 October 1972; goods traffic at Highbridge itself had ceased on 2 November 1964.

The 'and Burnham-on-Sea' was dropped from the station name from 6 May 1974 when the station reverted to its original name of 'Highbridge'. It then adopted its current name 'Highbridge and Burnham' on 13 May 1991.

Preceding station	Historical railways	Following station
Brent Knoll	Great Western Railway (Bristol to Exeter)	Dunball
Bason Bridge	Somerset & Dorset Joint Railway (Burnham-on-Sea to Evercreech Junction)	Burnham-on-Sea

== Description ==
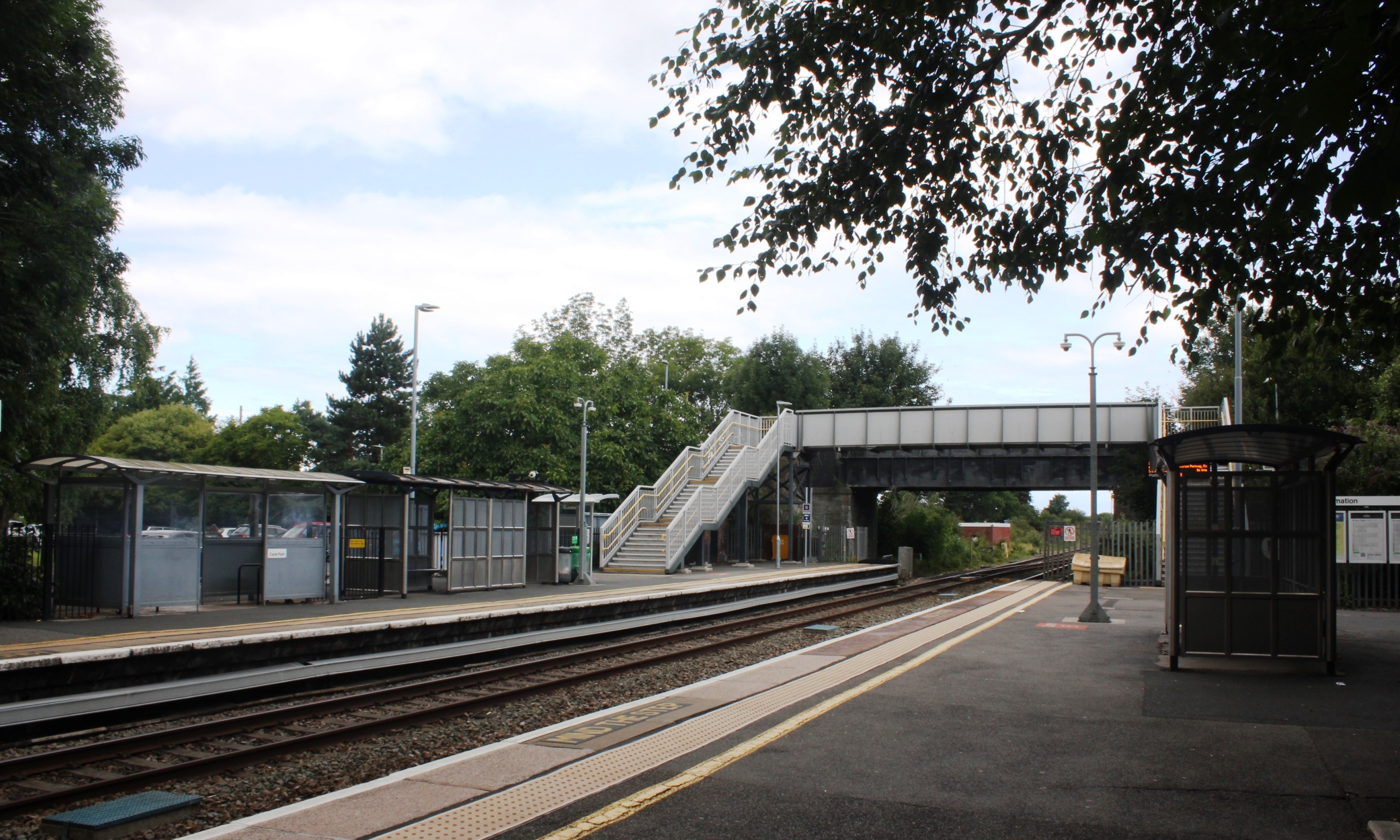
Looking northwards

All of the original B&ER/GWR and S&DJR buildings have all been demolished, replaced on both platforms by metal and glass bus shelters. The track of the former S&DJR lines is now hard to trace, being obliterated under new construction, both westwards to Burnham and eastwards to Glastonbury. There is no trace of the former S&DJR platforms, engine shed or works, all of which are now beneath new housing to the east of platform No.1. A couple of old wagon wheels sit on a short length of track on a plinth within the Highbridge industrial estate, as a reminder of Highbridge's railway past. Part of the site of the former B&ER/GWR goods yard to the north of the station/road bridge remains, although the goods shed was demolished in the 1980s, and now lies in part beneath a newly developed Asda supermarket.

The last remaining piece of historic infrastructure was the 1950s BR replacement footbridge, which had been truncated in the 1960s following the closure of the S&DJR platforms, giving it a splayed-out access route from the eastern platform No.1. It remained in place until 1 December 2013, when due to concrete cancer it was replaced by a new metal structure by Network Rail contractors.

The main entrance to the station is on the town (western) side of the line and this gives access to the northern-bound, towards Weston-super-Mare and Bristol Temple Meads platform No.2. The southern-bound, towards Bridgwater and Taunton platform No.1, can be reached by the footbridge or through the housing estate that occupies the site of the former S&DJR platforms. Both main line platforms extend south across the tidal River Brue, and are sited slightly below sea level.

A loop on the west side of the line south of the station can be used by goods trains in either direction, southbound trains crossing over to run wrong line through the northbound No.2 platform to do so. This crossing also allows terminating passenger trains from the north to reverse here if required.

== Services ==
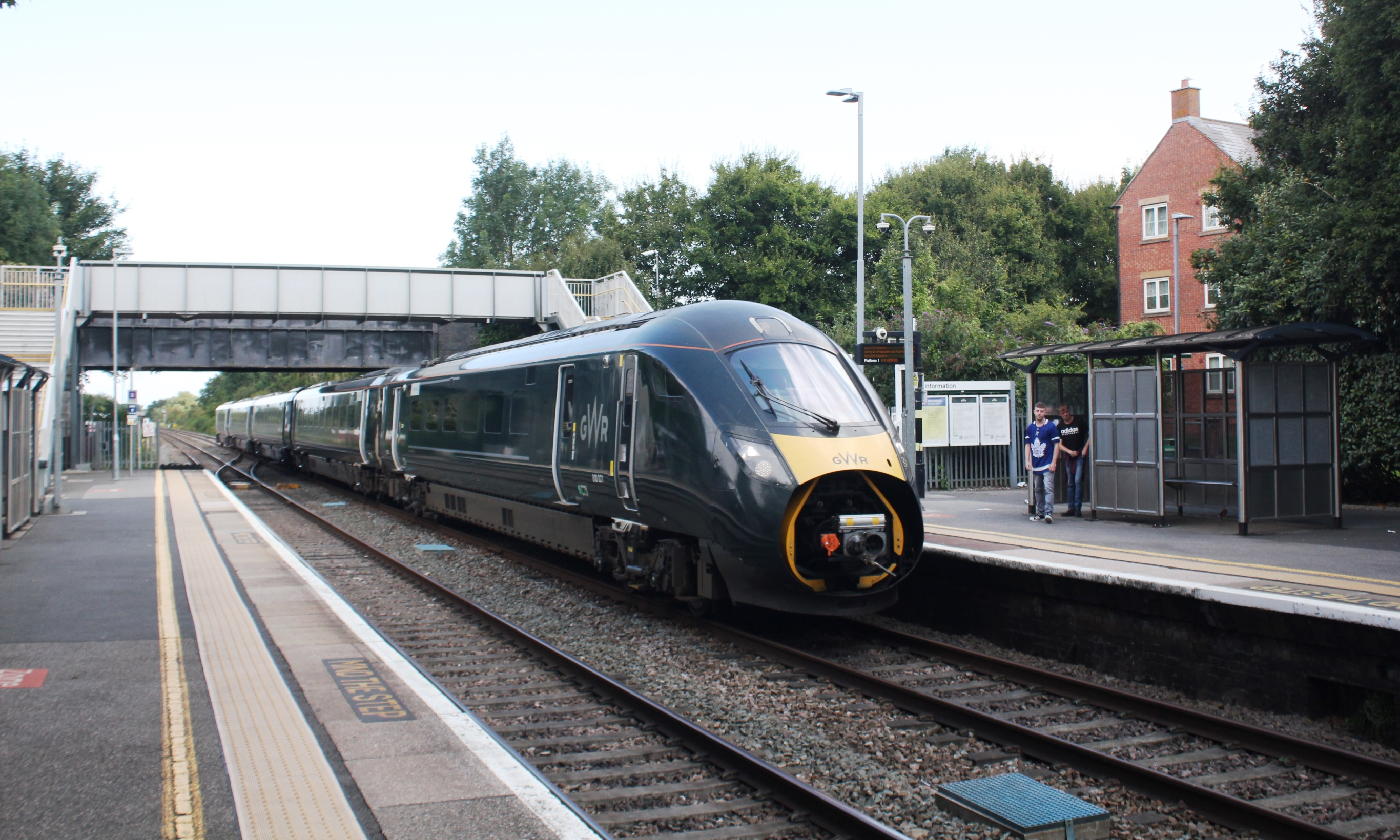
A Class 800 with a train to Taunton.

The station and all train services are operated by Great Western Railway. The basic weekday service pattern comprises one train in each direction each hour, most of which operate to and from Cardiff Central and Taunton, but with fewer services operating on Sundays.

Preceding station	National Rail	Following station
Weston-super-Mare	Great Western Railway (Bristol–Exeter line)	Bridgwater

== Location ==
The station is located on the eastern side of Highbridge town centre, 0.25 miles (0.40 km) along the B3139 Market Street. Burnham-on-Sea is a further 2 miles (3.2 km) to the west. A walking and cycle route can be followed, mainly alongside the River Brue and on the approximate path way of the former S&DJR extension route. Daily bus services run from the town centre to/from Burnham-on-Sea while less frequent services operate to Wells.
