= Burnham-on-Sea and Highbridge =

Civil parish in Somerset, England

Coordinates: 51.2376°N 2.9935°W

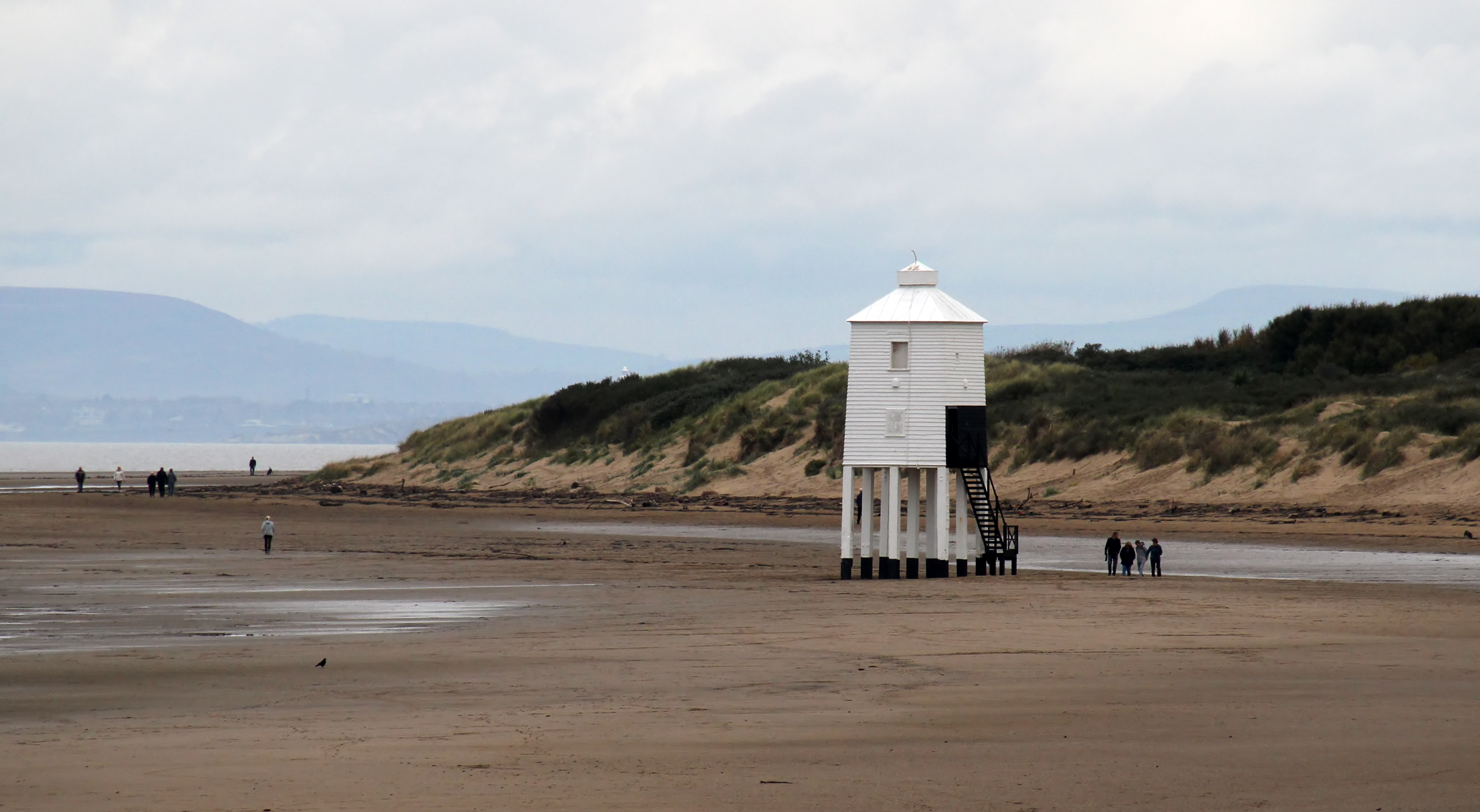
- Burnham-on-Sea Wooden Lighthouse

- Location within Somerset
- Population: 19,846 (Parish, 2021)
- Civil parish: Burnham-on-Sea and Highbridge
- Unitary authority: Somerset
- Ceremonial county: Somerset
- Region: South West
- Country: England
- Sovereign state: United Kingdom
- Police: Avon and Somerset
- Fire: Devon and Somerset
- Ambulance: South Western

Burnham-on-Sea and Highbridge is a civil parish in Somerset, England. The parish contains the towns of Burnham-on-Sea and Highbridge. At the 2021 census, the parish had a population of 19,846.

== History ==
The parish was created under its current name in 1974 as part of wider local government reforms under the Local Government Act 1972. It was a successor parish, covering the area of the abolished Burnham-on-Sea Urban District.

The Burnham-on-Sea Urban District had its origins in a local board district called Burnham which had been created in 1850 and reconstituted as an urban district in 1894. The urban district was formally renamed from Burnham to Burnham-on-Sea in 1917.

Neighbouring Highbridge was made an urban district in 1896. The Highbridge Urban District was abolished in 1933 and its area absorbed into Burnham-on-Sea Urban District.

== Governance ==
There are two tiers of local government covering the parish, at parish (town) and unitary authority level: Burnham-on-Sea and Highbridge Town Council and Somerset Council. The town council is based at the Old Courthouse on Jaycroft Road in Burnham-on-Sea.

For national elections, the parish of Burnham-on-Sea and Highbridge forms part of the Bridgwater constituency.
