= Bason Bridge railway station =

Disused railway station in England

Coordinates: 51.2077°N 2.9377°W

Bason Bridge
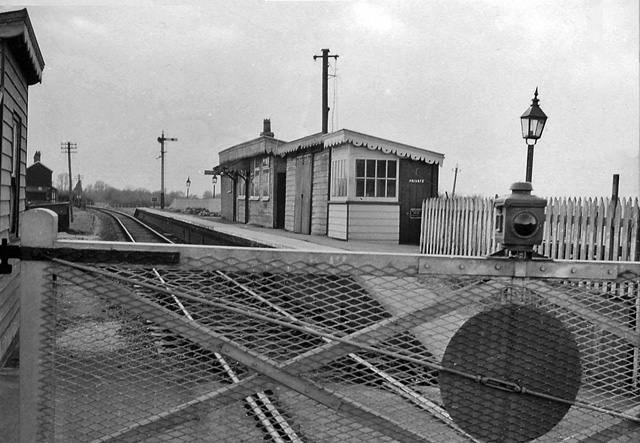
- Bason Bridge railway station in 1963

General information
- Location: near East Huntspill, Somerset; England
- Grid reference: ST345458
- Platforms: 1

Other information
- Status: Disused

History
- Pre-grouping: Somerset Central Railway
- Post-grouping: SR and LMS; Western Region of British Railways

Key dates
- July 1856: Opened
- 10 June 1963: Closed to goods traffic
- 7 March 1966: Closed to passengers
- 2 October 1972: Closed to milk traffic
Location

Bason Bridge railway station was a station on the Highbridge branch of the Somerset and Dorset Joint Railway, serving the village of East Huntspill.

Opened by the Somerset Central Railway in 1856, the station consisted of a wooden platform and buildings. A level crossing, goods yard and dedicated siding for milk train to the Wiltshire United Co-operative Society's creamery, were operated from two lever frames, one at each end of the station.

The station closed with the SDJR on 7 March 1966, although access to the dairy was maintained via a spur from Highbridge. In the months before closure, goods trains loaded with fly ash tipped at the construction site of the M5 motorway to enable it to progress across the Somerset Levels. Progress on construction of the motorway finally closed the spur line on 3 October 1972. The station site was later cleared, but the station house survived as a private house.

The roof of the station house caught fire on 10 April 2020 and the property was subsequently demolished.

Preceding station	Disused railways	Following station
Edington; Line and station closed	Somerset & Dorset Joint Railway; LSWR and Midland Railways	Highbridge and Burnham; Station open
