= Bridgwater railway station =

Railway station in Somerset, England

Bridgwater
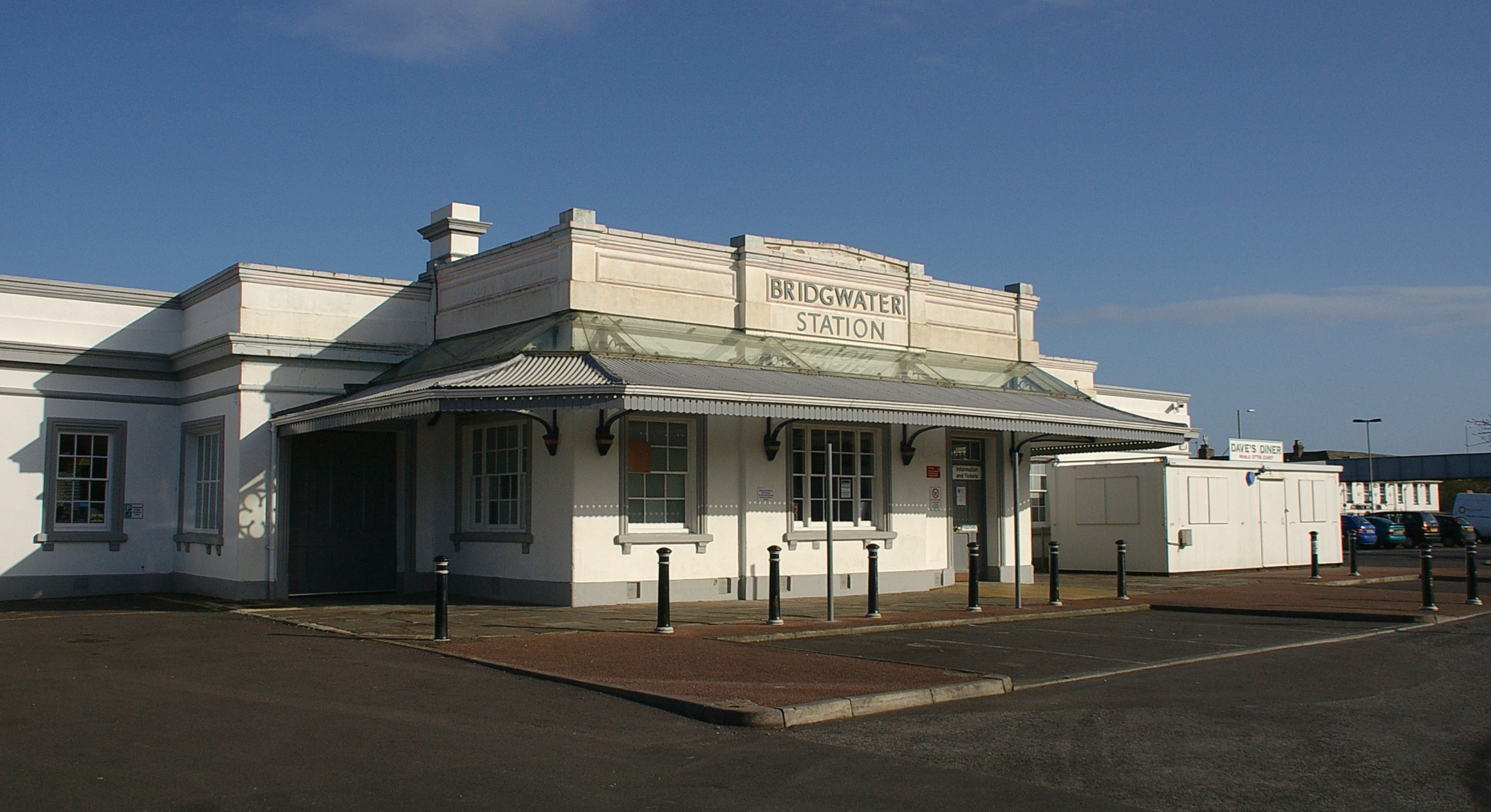
- The main station building

General information
- Location: Bridgwater, Somerset; England
- Coordinates: 51.1272°N 2.9917°W
- Grid reference: ST307369
- Manager: Great Western Railway
- Platforms: 2

Other information
- Station code: BWT
- Classification: DfT category E

History
- Original company: Bristol and Exeter Railway
- Pre-grouping: Great Western Railway
- Post-grouping: Great Western Railway

Key dates
- 1841: Opened

Passengers
- 2021/22: ▲0.352 million
- 2022/23: ▲0.429 million
- 2023/24: ▲0.442 million
- 2024/25: ▲0.487 million
- 2025/26: ▲0.531 million

Listed Building – Grade II*
- Feature: Bridgwater railway station
- Designated: 16 December 1974
- Reference no.: 1187364
Location
Notes
- Passenger statistics from the Office of Rail and Road

Bridgwater railway station serves the town of Bridgwater in Somerset, England. It is on the Bristol to Taunton Line between the stations of Highbridge and Burnham and Taunton, 53 miles 16 chains (53.20 mi; 85.6 km) from Bristol Temple Meads. It is operated by Great Western Railway.

The station opened in 1841 to the designs of Isambard Kingdom Brunel. It is now a Grade II* listed building.

== History ==
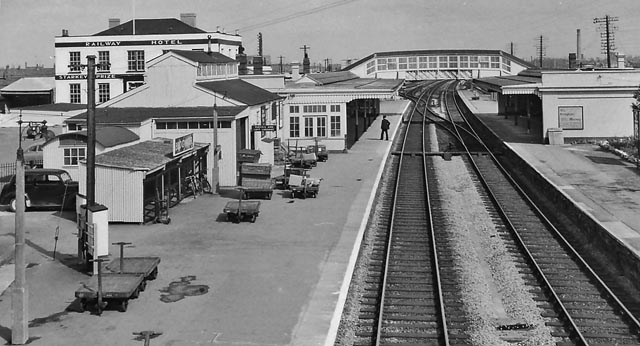
The station in 1963

The railway arrived at Bridgwater on 14 June 1841 when the Bristol and Exeter Railway opened the first section of its line from Bristol. Bridgwater was the terminus of the line for a year while the Somerset Bridge was constructed over the River Parrett on the outskirts of the town; the line was extended to Taunton on 1 June 1842.

During the period that the station was a terminus it became a focus for horse-drawn coaches that met the trains and carried their passengers onwards. An accident happened when one of these was overturned on the level crossing that was situated at the south end of the platforms, although the only serious injury was a bystander who broke an ankle – the coach driver and passengers were largely unscathed. A hotel was built just outside the station entrance which has since been demolished, but the houses provided for the company's staff can still be seen opposite the station.

The Bristol and Exeter Railway was initially operated by the Great Western Railway (GWR) but from 1 May 1849 the company operated its own trains. Coke ovens, to provide fuel for the locomotives, and workshops to build and maintain the carriages and wagons, were built to the west of the line between Bridgwater station and the river – this is the nearest station to the halfway point on the line. They closed following a fire on 25 August 1947, although by this time they were only repairing wagon sheets (that is, canvas covers for wagons).

Bridgwater Corporation opened a branch line from the station goods yard to the town's East Quay in 1845. It was later sold to the railway company and in 1871 was extended across the river. As well as serving the quays, industries along the branch included a pottery and a brewery. The extension served Sully's coal yard which brought coal into the town by ship and distributed it by canal and railway. Bridgwater was also the home of George Hennet's iron works (later Bridgwater Engineering Company) which made track, signals and wagons for several different companies including atmospheric railway pipes for the South Devon Railway Company.

The station was improved in 1882 when the platforms were extended, new roofs and a footbridge were provided. The platforms were lengthened again in 1904. A temporary engine shed was provided while the station was a terminus in 1841 and 1842, but this was moved to Taunton when that place became the terminus. An engine shed was provided in the carriage works at Bridgwater in 1893.

A new connection was provided to the west of the line half a mile north of the station on 16 June 1935 to allow access to the private siding of the British Cellophane Company siding. It was shunted by a 0-4-0ST Peckett steam locomotive from 1936 which was joined by an Andrew Barclay 0-4-0ST in 1950. The siding was shunted by British Railways locomotives from 1960 but in July 1969 former British Rail Class 03 diesel locomotive D2133 became the works shunter. This moved to the West Somerset Railway in July 1996 for preservation. The works closed in 2005.

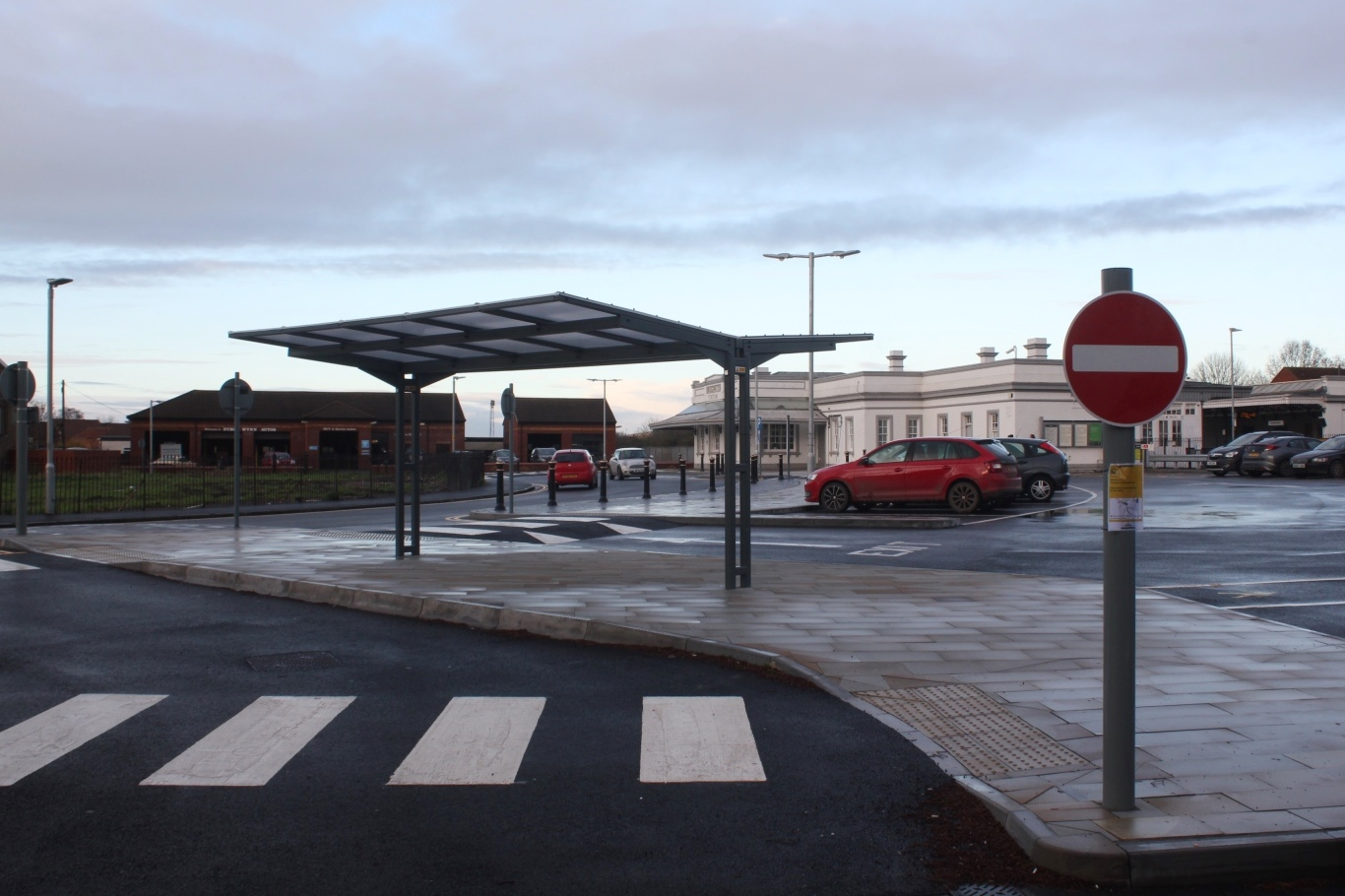
Bus stop installed in 2019

Stations in many towns were renamed after the nationalisation of the railways in 1948 to avoid confusion. This one, the former GWR station, became Bridgwater Central on 26 September 1949 to distinguish it from "Bridgwater North", the former Somerset and Dorset Joint Railway terminus until that station was closed to passengers in 1952.

The carriage works closed after a fire on 25 August 1947 and the engine shed closed in July 1960. Public goods traffic at Bridgwater station ended in November 1965 and the docks branch closed in April 1967. The goods yard remains to the north of the station to handle traffic for the nuclear power station at Hinkley Point.

The station was given listed building status in December 1974, as was the bridge on the docks branch in 1994.

The station forecourt was refurbished in 2019 at a cost of £1.2m. This work included a new bus stop but bus operators and rail replacement services cannot use it as it is only suitable for vehicles up to 8.7 metres (29 ft).

== Description and facilities ==
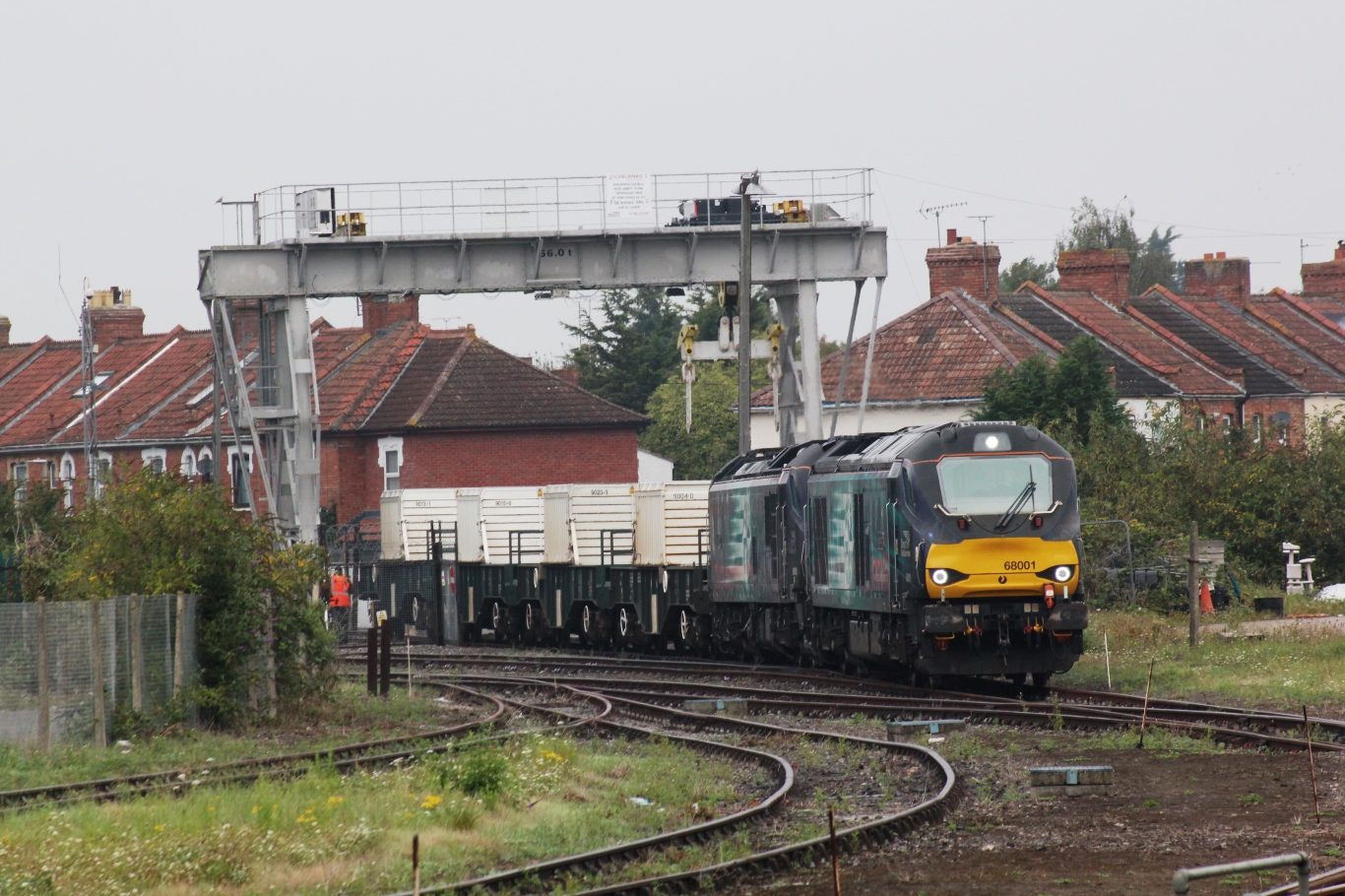
Two Class 68 locomotives of Direct Rail Services in the goods yard

Bridgwater is at 151 miles 47 chains (151.59 mi; 244.0 km) from the zero point at London Paddington via Box, which is 53 miles 16 chains (53.20 mi; 85.6 km) from Bristol Temple Meads.

It is on St John Street with small car park. The ticket office and toilets are open during the morning and early afternoon but not on Sundays. The platforms have step-free access. The main entrance is on the town side of the station and the platform served by trains towards Bristol.

The single-storey station buildings are in a classical style, the walls covered in stucco and the roofs slated. Canopies above the platforms are supported by hexagonal cast iron columns and lattice girders. There is a covered footbridge between the platforms.

To the north of the platforms and on the west side of the line is a goods yard. The only goods traffic is the Direct Rail Services trains that collect nuclear waste from the nuclear power station at Hinkley Point.

== Services ==
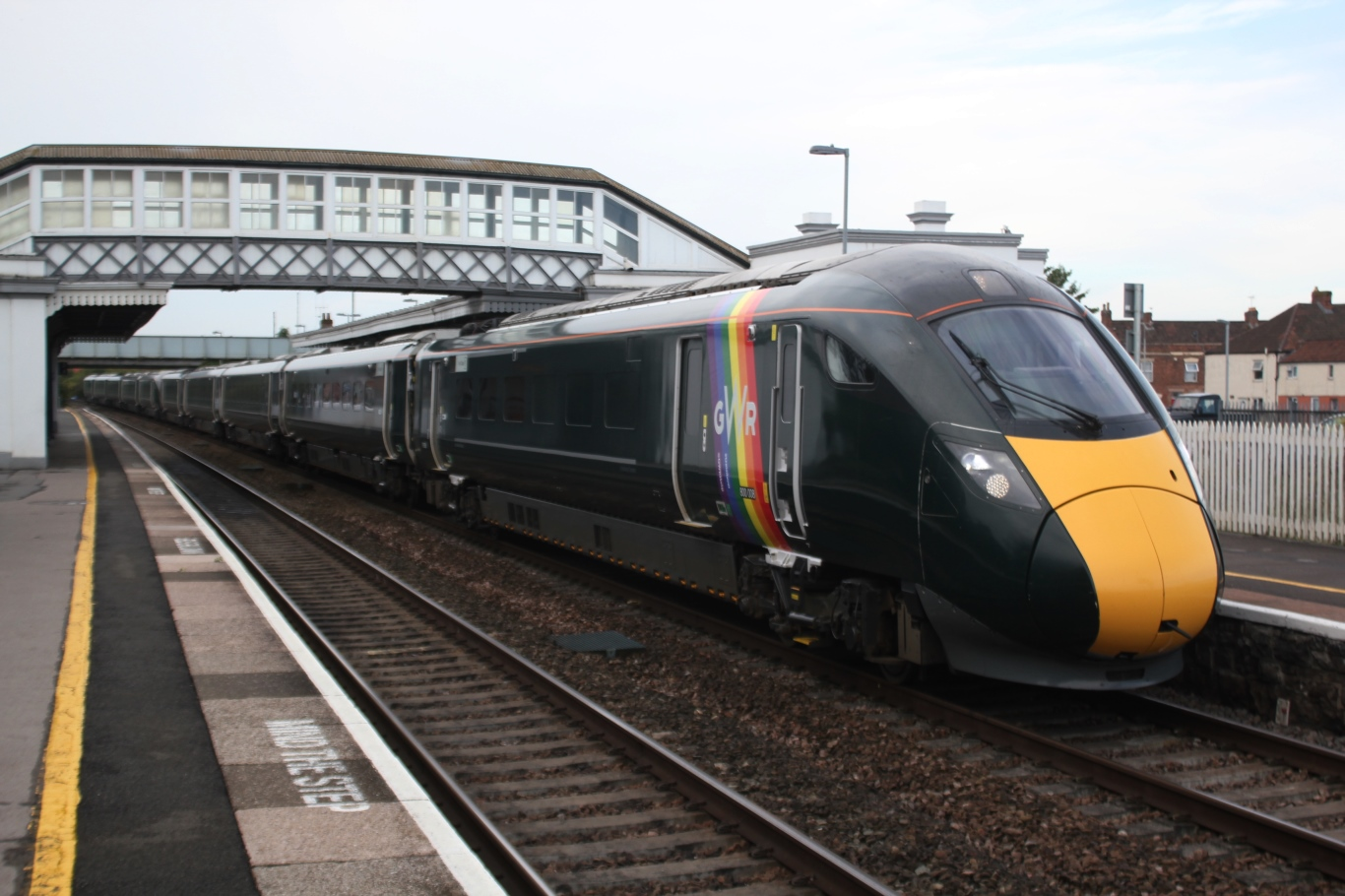
A GWR Class 800 at Bridgwater

The station and all passenger services are operated by Great Western Railway (GWR). The general service has one train in each direction each hour to and from Cardiff Central via Bristol Temple Meads and Taunton, many of which continue beyond Taunton to Exeter St Davids or Penzance. There are fewer services on Sundays. Some additional services call to give a direct service via Bristol Temple Meads to London Paddington on weekday mornings, with return services in the evening.

Preceding station	National Rail	Following station
Highbridge and Burnham	Great Western Railway (Bristol–Exeter line)	Taunton

== Docks branch ==
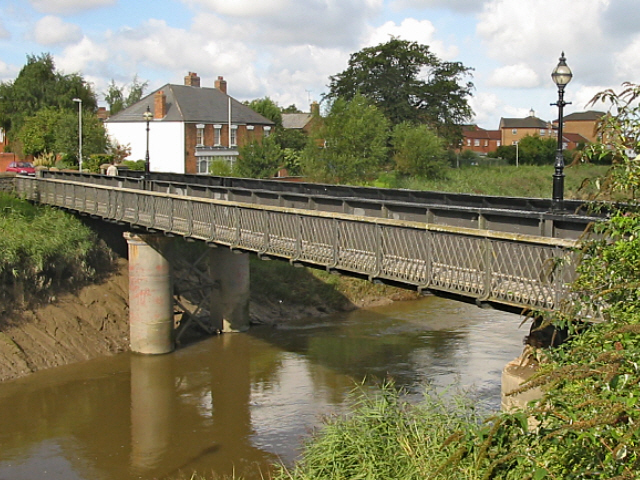
The Telescopic River Parrett Bridge, now a foot bridge

The Bristol and Exeter Railway Act 1836 had allowed for a branch to the river at Bridgwater but this was never constructed. Instead, the Corporation of Bridgwater built a tramway from the station to wharves (later known as Clink Yard) on the north side of the River Parrett; this was opened in 1845 and worked by horses. It crossed both the busy Bristol Road and Church Street on level crossings. The railway took over the tramway in 1859 and rebuilt it for locomotive operation in 1867. In March 1871 it was extended across the river to Bridgwater Docks, which formed the entrance to the Bridgwater and Taunton Canal and was owned by the railway company. The telescopic bridge was designed by Francis Fox, the railway's engineer. An 80-foot (24 m) section of railway track to the east of the bridge could be moved sideways, so that the main 127-foot (39 m) girders could be retracted.

On 27 June 1954 a new connection was made from Clink Yard to the former Somerset and Dorset Joint Railway station to allow goods traffic to reach that station following the closure of that line's Bridgwater branch.

The branch was closed in April 1967. The telescopic bridge is still in position but no longer moves; it was converted to a footbridge in 1982. One of the last steam locomotives from the branch, ex-Cardiff Railway 0-4-0ST 1338 was taken to Bleadon and Uphill railway station for preservation but, following the closure of the museum there, has now been moved to the Didcot Railway Centre.

== Somerset Bridge ==
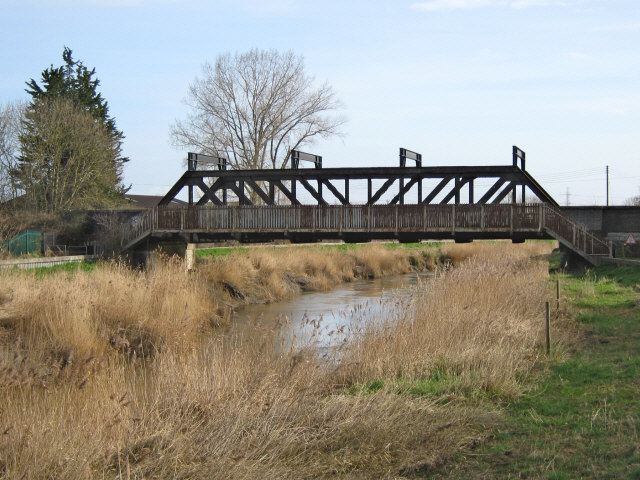
The Somerset Bridge in 2009

On the southern edge of Bridgwater the railway had to cross the River Parrett, which was still a navigable river in those days. Isambard Kingdom Brunel designed a brick bridge with a 100 feet (30 m) span but a rise of just 12 feet (3.7 m), this was flatter than his famous Maidenhead Railway Bridge across the River Thames. Work started in 1838 and was completed in 1841. Brunel left the centering scaffold in place as the foundations were still settling but was forced to remove it in 1843 to reopen the river for navigation. He demolished the brick arch and had it replaced with a timber arch within six months, without interrupting the traffic on the railway. This was in turn replaced in 1904 by a steel girder bridge.
