= Arthur Gilbert (triathlete) =

English triathlete

Arthur Gilbert MBE (1921 – 23 October 2015) was an English triathlon competitor who came to notice in 2012 as the world's oldest triathlete.

== Early life ==
Gilbert was born in Portsmouth, Hampshire in 1921.

He was a veteran of World War II. He became a helicopter engineer at Westland Helicopters in Somerset and used to cycle the 20-mile journey to work.

== Triathlon ==
Gilbert began running competitively in the 1970s and first competed in a triathlon when he was 64 years old. He subsequently competed in over 40 multi-event races. His training regime included 50 lengths of his local swimming pool every day, 3 visits to the gym each week and 25 km on a bicycle on Sundays.

He was awarded the MBE, presented by Prince Charles in 2008, for his charity fundraising.

Gilbert became Britain's oldest triathlete aged 90, when he completed the Burnham-on-Sea Triathlon in April 2011. His time was 1 hour 20 minutes and nine seconds. In December 2011 the World Record Academy confirmed the 90-year-old was also the oldest triathlete in the world.

In May 2012 he was an Olympic torchbearer and jogged the 300-metre stretch through Minehead, Somerset. As a local celebrity, in July he opened a new care home, Kingfisher Lodge, in nearby Saltford.

Gilbert competed in his 41st triathlon, the Burnham Sprint Triathlon, in early June 2012. It involved a 500-metre swim, 20 km bike ride and a 5 km run. The swim took 31 minutes and 54 seconds, one hour 11 minutes and 8 seconds for the cycling phase and 59 minutes and 20 seconds for the run. "It was really tough. As the years go by it gets harder and harder, you do go backwards as you get older," he commented.

He was fortunate with injuries, his only major problem being a ruptured ankle tendon which he incurred in the mid-1990s.

After completing another Burnham Triathlon in April 2013, Gilbert suggested it would be his last, preferring to help marshal the Burnham event in 2014.

== Personal life ==
Gilbert lived in Burnham-on-Sea, Somerset. His wife died in 2009 and his son died in the same year, aged only 55. Gilbert said his sports activities helped him through these losses. He attributed his abilities to a stress-free life, eating bananas and regularly giving blood.

He died on 23 October 2015 aged 94.
