= Highbridge, Somerset =

Market town in Somerset, England

Coordinates: 51.2189°N 2.9730°W

Highbridge
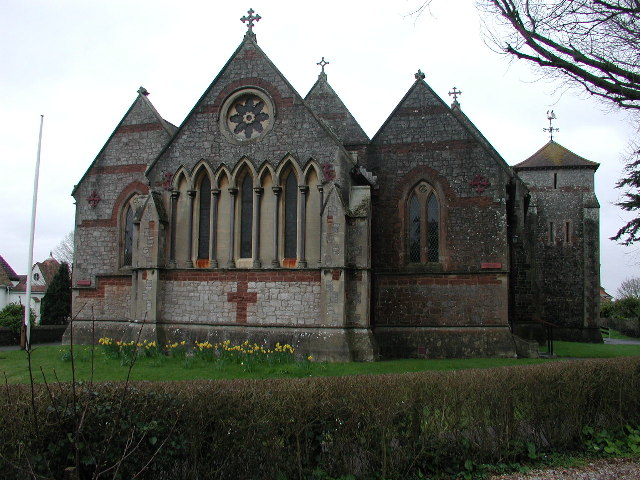
- St John's parish church

- Location within Somerset
- Population: 5,986 (Census 2001)
- OS grid reference: ST3247
- Civil parish: Burnham-on-Sea and Highbridge
- Unitary authority: Somerset Council
- Ceremonial county: Somerset
- Region: South West
- Country: England
- Sovereign state: United Kingdom
- Post town: Highbridge
- Postcode district: TA9
- Dialling code: 01278
- Police: Avon and Somerset
- Fire: Devon and Somerset
- Ambulance: South Western
- UK Parliament: Bridgwater

Highbridge is a historic market town on the edge of the Somerset Levels near the mouth of the River Brue in the county of Somerset, England. It is 20 miles (32 km) northeast of Taunton and 7 miles (11 km) north of Bridgwater. Highbridge closely neighbours Burnham-on-Sea, forming part of the combined parish of Burnham-on-Sea and Highbridge and shares a town council with the resort town. The 2001 Census recorded Highbridge's population as 5,986. In the 2011 Census the population of the town was included in the ward of Highbridge and Burnham Marine, which totalled 7,555.

== History ==
There is archaeological evidence of occupation around the Highbridge area at least as far back as the Roman period. There has been a bridge over the River Brue here since the 14th century and it has always been an important crossing on the route from Bristol to the South West. The town that sprung up around this crossing takes its name from the bridge. An older name for the local manor was "Huish" a contraction of the phrase "Huish jaxta altum pontem" (next to a high bridge). There are historical references to a wharf at this site and to usage of the river as part of the drainage plan for the Somerset Levels by the Monks of Glastonbury.

Highbridge grew in importance as a regional market and industrial town during the latter half of the 19th century and the early part of the 20th century. Important employers included the livestock and cheese market, Highbridge Wharf, Buncombe's Steamrollers, and the Somerset & Dorset Joint Railway railway works, which closed in 1930 with the loss of 400 jobs. Heavy industry and transport declined in Highbridge after the Second World War as the Wharf proved too small for the newer generation of ships, with the last cargo of timber arriving in 1948 and the wharf was closed to shipping the following year, and commercial freight moved away from the railways. Since the 1970s close proximity to the M5 motorway has driven a growth in light industry and in the town's commuter population.

In 2004 a community group, the Highbridge History Project, commemorated the 150th anniversary of opening of the town's station by publishing the results of their own five-year-long study into the town's history (Weston Mercury "A Glimpse into the past").

== Governance ==
There are two tiers of local government covering Highbridge, at parish (town) and unitary authority level: Burnham-on-Sea and Highbridge Town Council and Somerset Council. The town council is based at the Old Courthouse in Burnham-on-Sea.

For national elections, Highbridge forms part of the Bridgwater constituency.

=== Administrative history ===
Highbridge historically straddled the ancient parishes of Burnham and Huntspill. The parish boundary followed the old course of the River Brue through the middle of Highbridge.

A local board district covering the western part of Burnham parish around Burnham itself was established in 1850, but Highbridge was excluded from that district, being in the then more rural eastern part of the parish. Under the Local Government Act 1894, such local board districts were reconstituted as urban districts, and civil parishes were no longer allowed to straddle district boundaries. The part of the old Burnham parish outside the urban district therefore became a separate parish, which was named Highbridge.

Early in 1895, the newly formed parish council applied for Highbridge parish to also be made an urban district, and to have its boundaries extended to take in the part of the Highbridge built-up area which lay south of the old course of the Brue in Huntspill parish. It was subsequently decided to create an urban district called Highbridge, but just covering the built-up area. The new Highbridge Urban District came into effect in 1896, and comprised two civil parishes: Highbridge North covering the parts north of the old course of the Brue, and Highbridge South covering the parts ceded from Huntspill parish south of the old course of the Brue. The more rural part of Highbridge parish became a separate parish, which was named Burnham Without, having been part of Burnham parish until 1894.

Highbridge Urban District was abolished in 1933, when its area was absorbed into the Burnham-on-Sea Urban District (as the Burnham Urban District had been formally renamed in 1917). As part of the 1933 reforms, the civil parishes within the enlarged urban district were merged into a single Burnham-on-Sea parish.

Burnham-on-Sea Urban District was abolished in 1974 under the Local Government Act 1972, with its area becoming part of the new Sedgemoor district. A successor parish called 'Burnham-on-Sea and Highbridge' was created covering the former urban district as part of the 1974 reforms, with its parish council taking the name Burnham-on-Sea and Highbridge Town Council.

A 2001 referendum on administratively separating Highbridge from Burnham-on-Sea was unsuccessful, but there remains strong feeling among some sections of the community that they should be separated, as evidenced by a number of incidents of vandalism involving signs on the approach to the town.

Sedgemoor was abolished in 2023. Somerset County Council then took over district-level functions across its area, making it a unitary authority, and was renamed Somerset Council.

== Transport ==
Highbridge was originally the seaward terminus of the Glastonbury Canal and the Somerset Central Railway. The Canal was established first and was designed to improve drainage along the River Brue. It was also designed to create a trade link between Glastonbury and the sea. A new straight channel, with a clyce (the local name for a sluice), which runs from the present day tidal gates to the location of the current station, was cut in 1801 and the original course of the river was as the site for of Highbridge Wharf. The Canal opened in 1833 and while initially successful it later suffered from financial and engineering problems. Only the 1801 clyce remains of the Glastonbury Canal at Highbridge.

In 1844, the Bristol & Exeter Railway (a future component of the Great Western Railway) opened Highbridge station on what is now the Bristol–Exeter line. Ten years later the railway companies realised the potential of the route of the failing Glastonbury Canal and it was bought out by the Somerset Central Railway (a component of the Somerset & Dorset Railway).

This allowed them to build a railway line along the route of the old canal. Shortly afterwards local branch lines to Burnham-on-Sea and to the Wharf were added. These lines crossed the Great Western lines at grade, and crossed Church Street (the A38, and at that time the main road route to Devon and Cornwall) at a notorious level crossing which led to long tailbacks in the summer months. No traces of the crossing or associated signal box remain. At its height Highbridge Station had five platforms and a carriage works. The decline of the British railway network hit the Highbridge station hard and today there remain only two unstaffed platforms, following the closure of two branch lines in the 1960s. The official name of the station is now Highbridge & Burnham.

The old Highbridge station, which was an Isambard Kingdom Brunel original, was demolished in the 1980s. The Victorian former Station Master's house was also demolished. A housing estate now stands on much of the old railway lands.

== Geography ==
Highbridge town centre clusters around the crossroads formed by Church Street and Market Street. At their meeting point is a roundabout which marks the location of the town's original three-faced town clock. A modern concrete replacement clock, also with three faces and topped with the town's coat of arms stood in nearby Jubilee Gardens until its replacement with a more traditional four-faced clock in 2012. The town centre has faced a steady decline in recent years, with numerous small independent shops and major banks closing. NatWest, the last remaining bank in the town, finally closed its doors for the last time on 25 July 2014. The former wharf area is occupied by recently built new housing, which stretches alongside the river from the town centre to the railway.

=== Climate ===
Along with the rest of South West England, Highbridge has a temperate climate which is generally wetter and milder than the rest of the country. The annual mean temperature is approximately 10 °C (50.0 °F). Seasonal temperature variation is less extreme than most of the United Kingdom because of the adjacent sea temperatures. The summer months of July and August are the warmest with mean daily maxima of approximately 21 °C (69.8 °F). In winter mean minimum temperatures of 1 °C (33.8 °F) or 2 °C (35.6 °F) are common. In the summer the Azores high pressure affects the south-west of England, however convective cloud sometimes forms inland, reducing the number of hours of sunshine. Annual sunshine rates are slightly less than the regional average of 1,600 hours. In December 1998 there were 20 days without sun recorded at Yeovilton. Most of the rainfall in the south-west is caused by Atlantic depressions or by convection. Most of the rainfall in autumn and winter is caused by the Atlantic depressions, which is when they are most active. In summer, a large proportion of the rainfall is caused by sun heating the ground leading to convection and to showers and thunderstorms. Average rainfall is around 700 mm (28 in). About 8–15 days of snowfall is typical. November to March have the highest mean wind speeds, and June to August have the lightest winds. The predominant wind direction is from the south-west.

== Economy ==
Following the closure of many small family shops and businesses and the development of some industrial estates (which take advantage of the proximity of the M5 motorway) much local employment is now in transport and light industry on the outskirts of the town, including food storage and distribution for Yeo Valley Organic and road hauliers RT Keedwell. Other established local employers on these out-of-town sites have closed in recent years, with the loss of furniture manufacture at Woodberry Brothers & Haines and food logistics at Brake Brothers. In 2017, plans were approved to construct an Aldi supermarket, a Travelodge budget hotel, with initial plans for a drive-through takeaway also being considered on the Isleport Industrial Estate.

The town had an independent livestock market on the same site from 1851 until 2007. It was previously run by J.H. Palmer and Sons and met weekly on Monday. The market closed briefly during the 2001 UK foot and mouth crisis, and in 2007 moved to a purpose built site at Huntworth near Bridgwater which also replaced the livestock market at Taunton. The former market site is now earmarked for redevelopment; houses now built there) the adjoining Highbridge Hotel was damaged in a catastrophic fire on 22 April 2008. Parts of the hotel are Georgian in origin and are Grade II listed (grade two listing now been removed and the hotel demolished). Following considerable local pressure to remove or redevelop the hotel site, a plan was approved in November 2013 to build housing on the former cattle market area, with the hotel being protected for future development.

In February 2010, American computing giant IBM announced that it would be creating dozens of jobs in a new service centre in Highbridge as part of the Into Somerset inward investment programme for Somerset.

== Landmarks ==
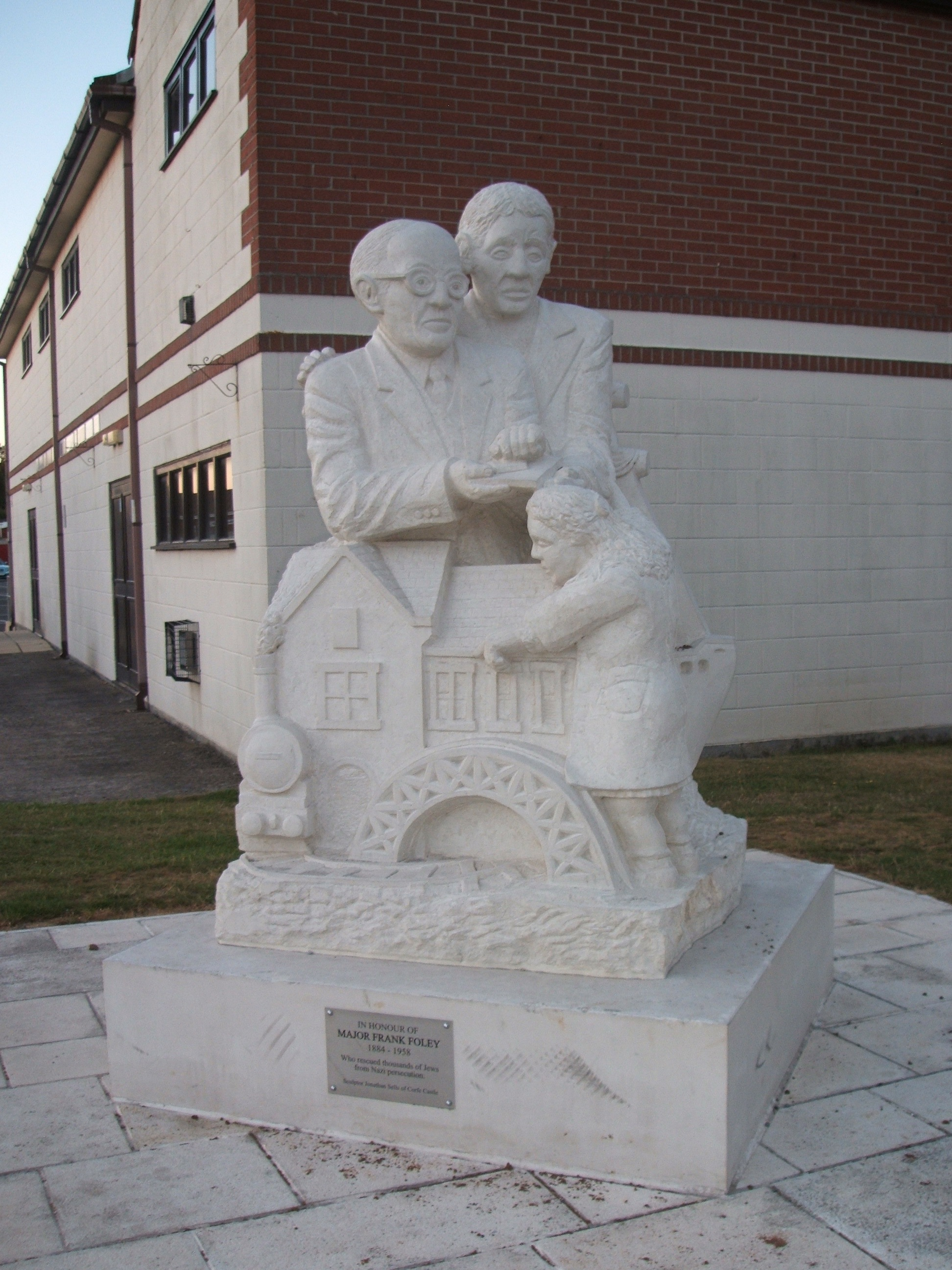
Statue of Frank Foley in Highbridge

The Community Hall (opened in 1994) stands on the site of the former Town Hall (built in 1885, demolished in 1984) and Railway Hotel, and incorporates a large function room and associated meeting rooms, a small volunteer-operated public library and offices for Homes in Sedgemoor, the local housing authority. However, since cuts by Sedgemoor District Council in 2007/08, these offices have not been open to the public.

Like most British towns Highbridge has had its ample share of alehouses and inns. Many of these depended on trade from the wharf and livestock market and numerous public houses existed close to these facilities along Newtown Road. Now only The Globe remains in this area. The Cooper's Arms, once recognised by the Campaign for Real Ale (CAMRA) as one of the best pubs in the region has declined in popularity in recent times. Since the freehold was sold it has had various tenants, none of which have been successful. The town is also served by The Bristol Bridge Inn and a thriving social club. This decline in the number of public houses has also affected local skittles leagues who are facing a reduction in the number of venues in which this locally very popular pub game can be played.

== Media ==
Local news and television programmes are BBC West and ITV West Country. Television signals are received from the Mendip TV transmitter. Local radio stations are BBC Radio Somerset on 95.5 FM, Heart West on 102.6 FM, and Greatest Hits Radio South West on 102.4 FM. The town is served by the local newspapers, Burnham & Highbridge Weekly News and Somerset County Gazette.

== Education ==
The town is served by Churchfield Church School - a primary academy managed by the Diocese of Bath and Wells, and amalgamated from the former Beechfield Infant School and St John's Church of England Junior Schools which shared the same site. The local coeducational comprehensive school is The King Alfred School, which sits in Highbridge near the border with Burnham-on-Sea, which it also serves. It was founded in 1957 and is now a specialist Sports College. The majority of students continuing study travel to Bridgwater College.

== Religious sites ==
Highbridge is served by the Church of England parish church of St John the Evangelist and Hope Baptist Church, both in Church Street.

Mary Ann Ruscombe Poole gave money to build St John's and laid the foundation stone in 1856. It was opened in 1859. The South Aisle was included in the original plans but not completed until 1882 by Frederick Bligh Bond. Structural damage was identified during a survey in 1987.

== Notable people ==
- Edward Higgins (1864–1947), (General of the Salvation Army in the early 1930s) was born in Church Street, and lends his name to a development of elderly persons dwellings near the town centre.
- Frank Foley (1884–1958), the notes spy and "British Schindler", was born in Highbridge. He saved thousands of Jews in the Second World War, and is honoured by a statue near the Community Hall in the town centre.
