= Burnham-on-Sea railway station =

Disused railway station in England

Burnham-on-Sea
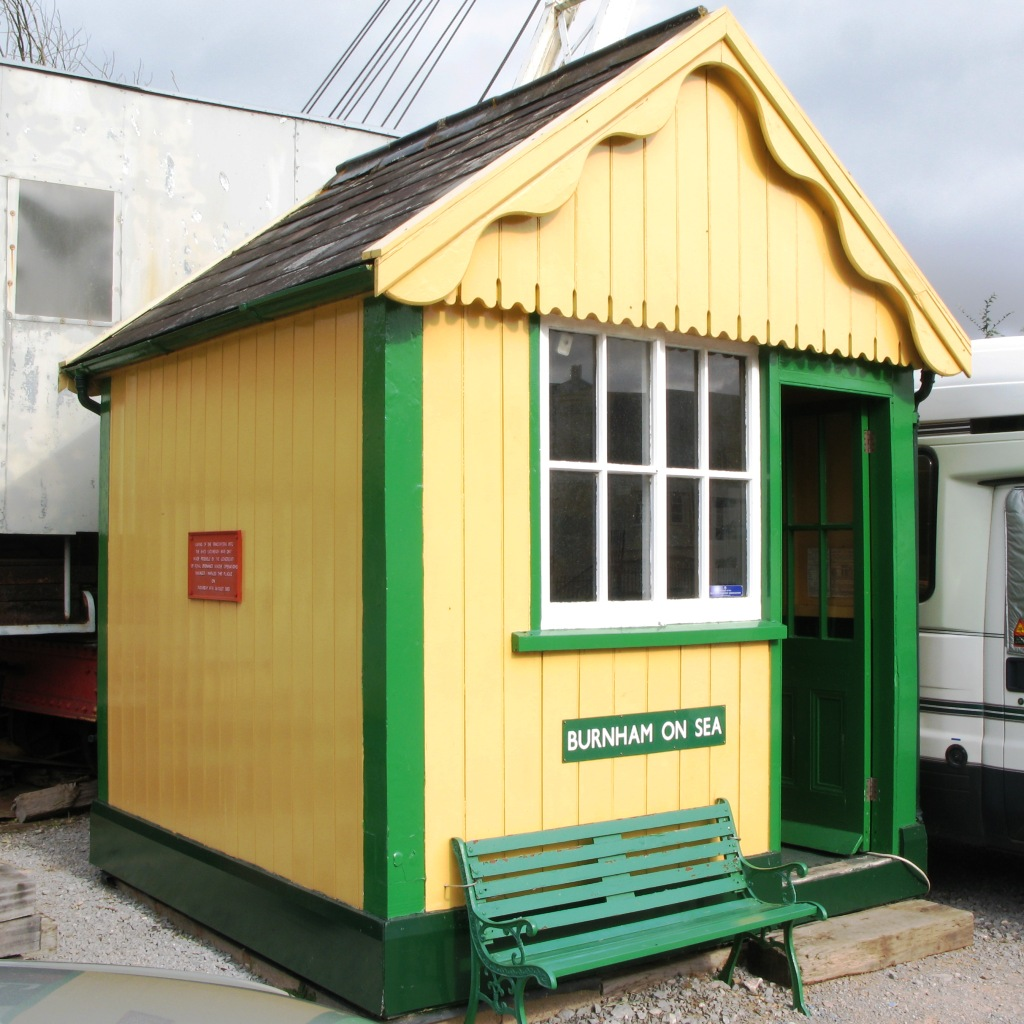
- The old signal box, now restored at Washford

General information
- Location: Burnham-on-Sea, Somerset; England
- Coordinates: 51.234049°N 2.997219°W
- Platforms: 2

Other information
- Status: Disused

History
- Pre-grouping: Somerset Central Railway
- Post-grouping: SR and LMS; Southern Region of British Railways

Key dates
- 3 May 1858: Opened (Burnham)
- 12 July 1920: Renamed (Burnham-on-Sea)
- 29 October 1951: Closed to passenger traffic
- 8 September 1962: Closed to excursion traffic
- 20 May 1963: Closed to goods traffic
Location

Burnham-on-Sea railway station was located within the town of Burnham-on-Sea, Somerset, and was the terminus of the Burnham branch of the Somerset and Dorset Joint Railway. Opened as Burnham by the Somerset Central Railway (SCR) on 3 May 1858, it was renamed in 1920.

== History ==
The station, situated behind Abingdon Street, was a terminus although a through platform allowed services to travel on to a 900 feet (270 m) SCR built stone pier on the River Severn/River Parrett estuary. For a few years the railway operated steamers across the Bristol Channel to Wales. Railway operations onto the pier ceased in 1888 although the pier continued in use for vessels until the 1950s.

Perhaps the strangest use of the railway along the pier was by the local area lifeboat, which was pushed on rails from the old lifeboat station (located behind the former Morrisons supermarket) and onto the "main line", across the esplanade, and down the pier where the lifeboat could be launched if the tide was right.

Burnham-on-Sea closed when regular passenger services were curtailed at Highbridge on 28 October 1951. Excursion traffic continued until 1962, and the goods depot remained open until 1963.

The nearest station to Burnham is now the former joint-GWR junction station known as Highbridge and Burnham.

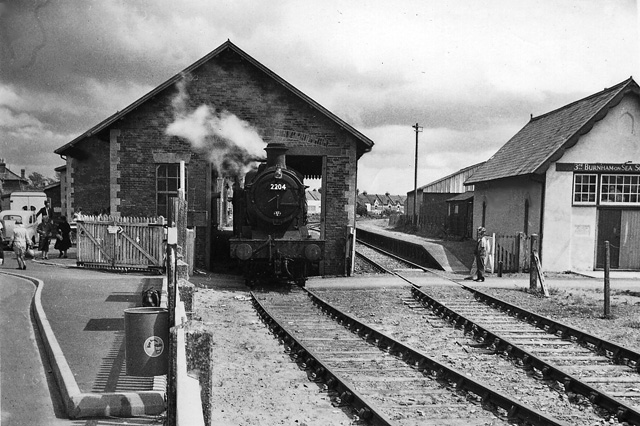
The station in 1962

Preceding station	Disused railways	Following station
Highbridge & Burnham; Line closed station open	Somerset and Dorset Joint Railway; LSWR and Midland Railways	Terminus

== Today ==
After the station's closure, the station building, main platform and goods shed were demolished. The excursion platform remained on the derelict site for over a decade, until the former trackbed eastwards was developed into Marine Drive, a road which has helped ease traffic flow into the town. The location of the station itself is on the junction of Old Station Approach and Abingdon Street, and the former goods yard is now a small car park. An adjacent pub on the High Street was subsequently renamed the Somerset & Dorset. The new RNLI station and yard occupy land to the south and east of the former main station building, adjacent to the site of the former excursion platform. The first ever specifically designed Somerfield supermarket was built to the seaward-west side, which was then sold to Morrisons. The site is now a B&M store.

== Sources ==
- Butt, R. V. J. (1995). The Directory of Railway Stations. Patrick Stephens Ltd. ISBN 1-85260-508-1.
