= The King Alfred School, Highbridge =

The King Alfred School – An Academy – part of The Priory Learning Trust

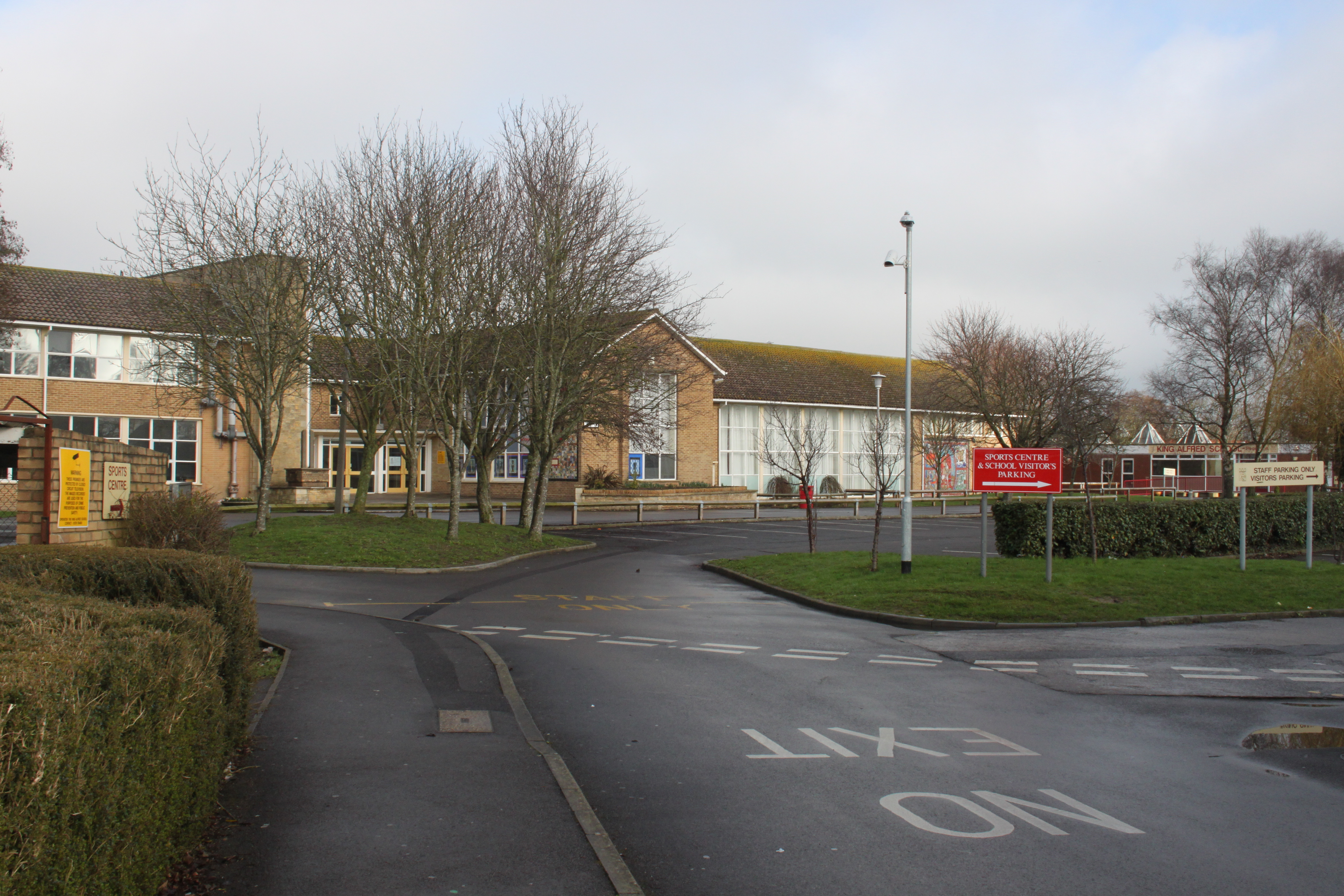

Location
- Burnham Road; Highbridge, Somerset, TA9 3EE; England; 51°13′41″N 2°59′02″W

Information
- Type: Academy
- Motto: Belong. Believe. Be Proud
- Established: November 1950; 75 years ago
- Local authority: Somerset County Council
- Department for Education URN: 146439 Tables
- Ofsted: Reports
- Principal: Dan Milford
- Gender: Coeducational
- Age: 11 to 18
- Enrolment: 1,420
- Website: www.tkasa.org.uk

The King Alfred School is a coeducational secondary school and sixth form located in Highbridge, Somerset, England. It is an academy and part of The Priory Learning Trust. It serves Brent Knoll, Highbridge, Burnham-on-Sea and the surrounding villages. In 2007, the school celebrated its 50th anniversary. In 2017 it had 1375 pupils.

The school is associated with the King Alfred Sports Centre which is next to the school site. There is some evidence of Roman remains under the school playing field.

== Academic performance ==
The Ofsted report in April 2017 rated the school as Inadequate overall with Requires improvement for 16-19 study programs Due to no overall improvement on GCSE results in English and Maths since 2013. The exam results were described as 'poor for several years'.

== Notable alumni ==
- Liam Phillips, BMX racing cyclist
- George Shelley, singer, actor and presenter, and a member of the boy band Union J
- Anthony Stephens, swimmer and Paralympian
