= Church of St Mary, Abbas and Templecombe =

Church in Somerset, England

Church of St Mary
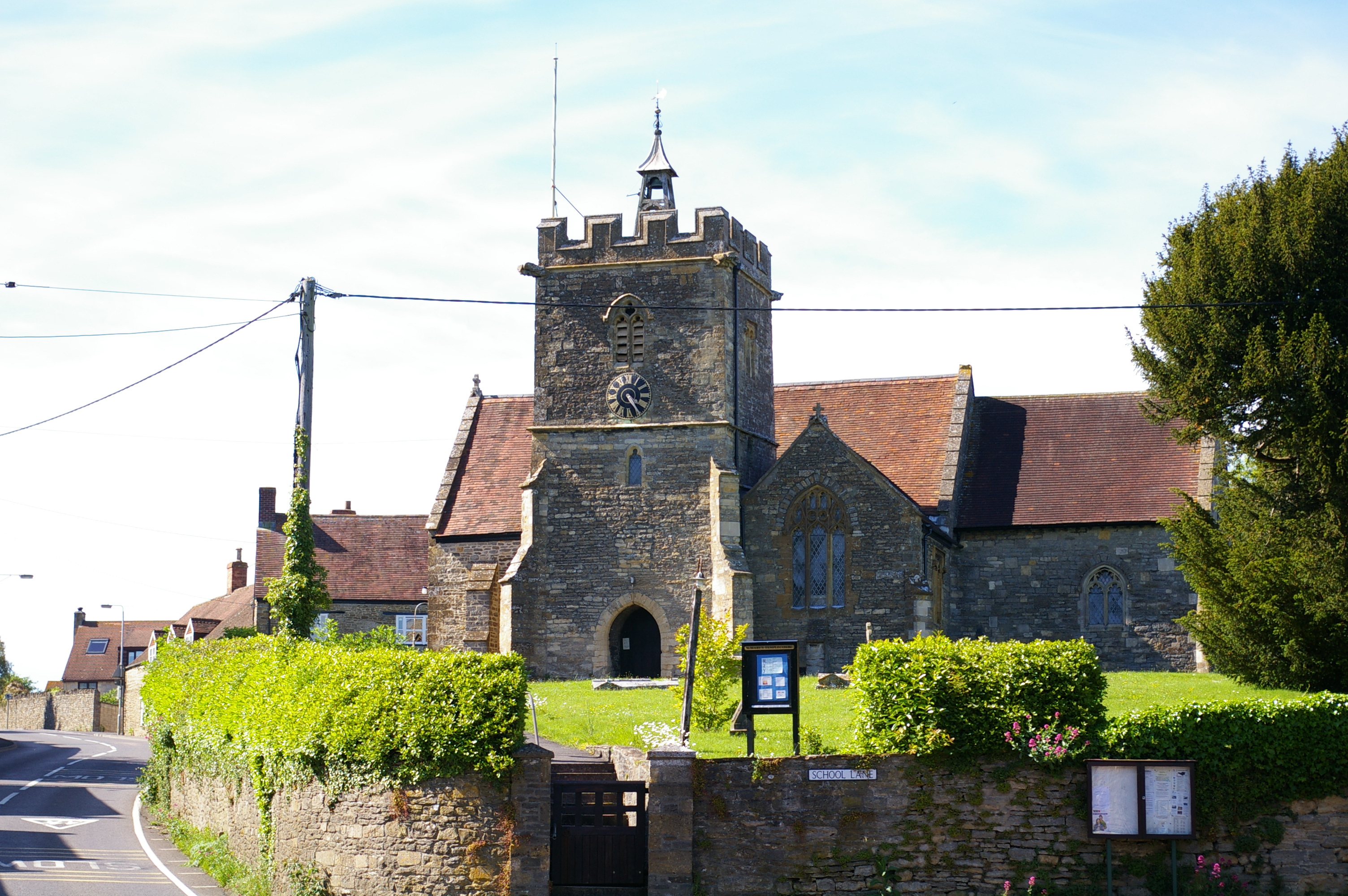

- Location within Somerset
- 51°00′10″N 2°25′00″W
- Location: Templecombe, Somerset, England

History
- Built: 12th century

Listed Building – Grade II*
- Official name: Church of St. Mary
- Designated: 24 March 1961
- Reference no.: 1366329

The Anglican Church of St Mary at Templecombe, within the English county of Somerset, was built in the 12th century and is a Grade II* listed building.

The parish is part of the benefice of Abbas and Templecombe, Henstridge and Horsington within the archdeaconry of Wells.

== History ==
One of the manors within the parish was held by Earl Leofwine who gave it to Bishop Odo of Bayeux after the Norman Conquest. The church was probably established during the period when the manor was held by Shaftesbury Abbey, but granted to the Knights Templar while it was held by his descendant Serlo FitzOdo, who established a preceptory in the village in 1185. The preceptory served as an administrative centre for the lands held by the Templars in the south west of England and Cornwall. It may also have been used to train men and horses for the Crusades. After the Knights Templar were suppressed following the 1307 order by Pope Clement IV, it was granted to the Knights of St John, who held it until the dissolution of the monasteries.

Parts of the original 12th-century church remain; however it underwent a major Victorian restoration in the 19th century, which included complete rebuilding of the chancel and the addition of the vestry. The foundations of the tower are probably Saxon.

The church was damaged by bombing in World War II. Four bombs falling near the church on its southern side damaged some of the arches in the nave along with the roof and tower, breaking some of the windows and damaging the organ.

== Architecture ==
The stone church is dressed with Hamstone with clay tile roofs. It has a two-bay chancel, four-bay nave and a south transept. The entrance porch is at the southern end of the church at the base of the two-stage tower. The buttresses were added after the tower was built. The oldest bell in the tower was cast at the Salisbury foundry around 1420. Two bells of 1656 were cast by Robert Purdue with two from 1736 by Thomas Bilbie of the Bilbie family. The most recent bell is from 1891.

In the churchyard is a 15 feet (4.6 m) high stone cross which serves as the war memorial for the village. The churchyard also contains four Commonwealth war graves, of two British Army soldiers of World War I and an airman and a WRNS Petty Officer of World War II.

== Interior ==
The font was made from Purbeck Marble in the 12th century; however the cover is from 1897. A cup and cover from 1628, two salvers made by Anthony Nelson in 1725 and a flagon from 1845 are included in the church plate.

=== The Templecombe Head ===
In the church is a painting on wooden boards of a head, which was discovered in the roof of an outhouse of a local building in 1945. The tenant of the cottage was collecting wood in an outhouse where part of the ceiling had fallen down. She noticed a face above her which was on a wooden panel fixed by wire to the inside of the roof and previously plastered over.

The painting is thought to be from the 13th century, and connected with the Templecombe Preceptory (or Combe Templariorum) which was established in the village in 1185. It was given to the church in 1956.

Restoration work in the 1950s and again in the 1980s has identified gold stars on the picture and microscopic evidence for bright colours which are no longer in evidence. The colours were present in the 1940s when it was discovered, but impaired when the local vicar cleaned it in his bath with Vim. The addition of a keyhole and hinges at some time in the past suggests it was used as a door.

For many years the head has been believed to be that of Christ but without the halo which was the norm in religious iconography at the time. The Knights Templar were suppressed partly because of their use of the image of Christ without the halo. There has been speculation linking the image with the Shroud of Turin. Other explanations suggest the image is not of Christ but of John the Baptist.

== See also ==
- List of ecclesiastical parishes in the Diocese of Bath and Wells
