= 761 Naval Air Squadron =

Inactive flying squadron of the Royal Navy's Fleet Air Arm

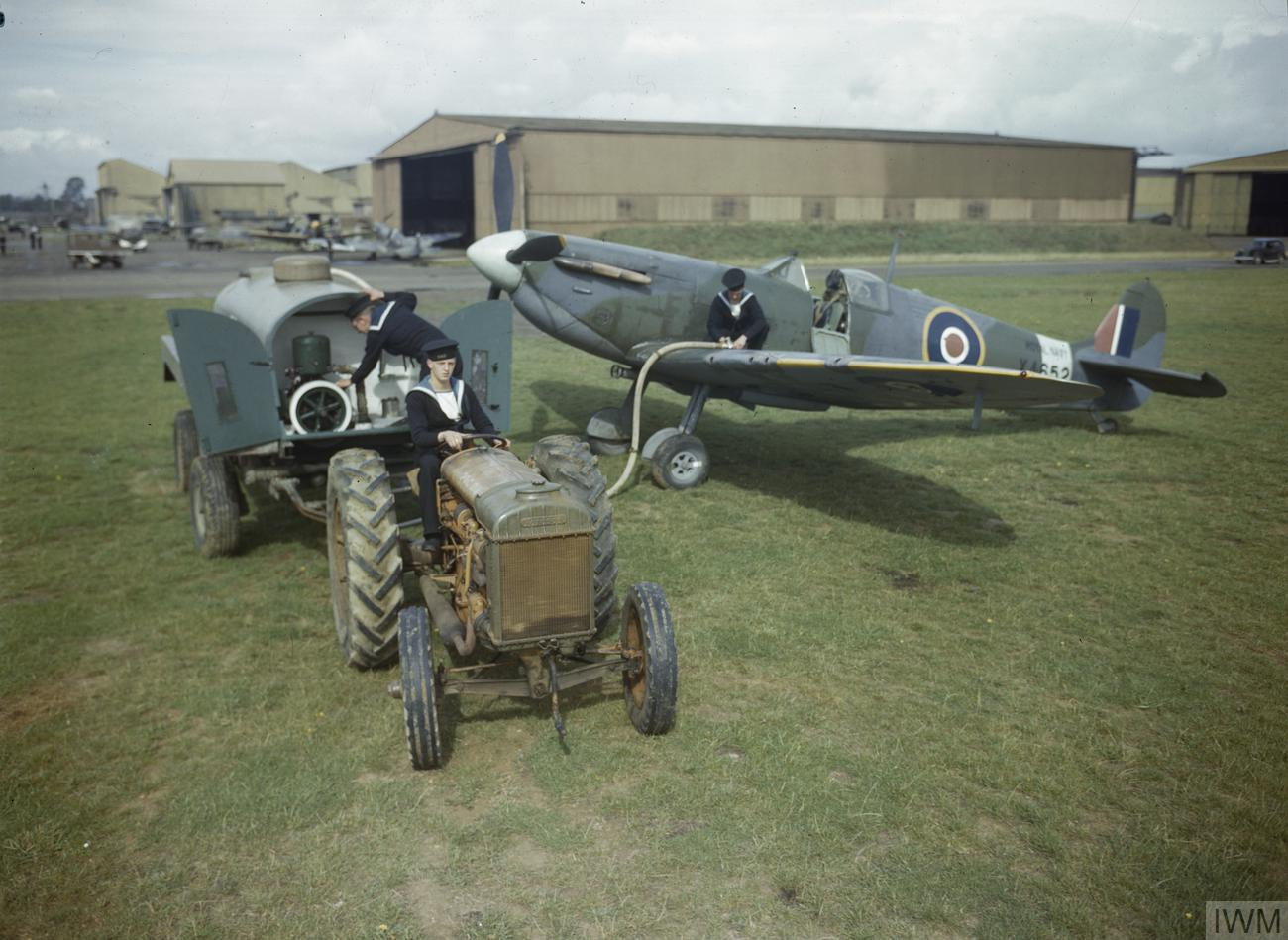
- A Supermarine Spitfire Mk Ia of 761 NAS at RNAS Yeovilton during 1943
- Active: 1941–1946
- Disbanded: 16 January 1946
- Country: United Kingdom
- Branch: Royal Navy
- Type: Fleet Air Arm Second Line Squadron
- Role: Naval Air Fighter School
- Size: Squadron
- Part of: Fleet Air Arm
- Home station: See Naval air stations section for full list.
- Aircraft: See Aircraft operated section for full list.

Commanders
- Notable commanders: Lieutenant Commander Richard John Cork, DSO, DSC; Commander Stanley Gordon Orr, DSC & Two Bars, AFC

Insignia
- Identification Markings: unknown (All types 1941 - 1942); G1A+ to G6A+ (All types 1943)

761 Naval Air Squadron (761 NAS), also called 761 Squadron, is an inactive Fleet Air Arm (FAA) naval air squadron of the United Kingdom’s Royal Navy (RN). It last operated the Supermarine Seafire Mk XVII fighter aircraft as part of the No. 2 Naval Air Fighter School, at HMS Dipper, RNAS Henstridge, Somerset.

It was formed at HMS Heron, RNAS Yeovilton, Somerset, as the Advanced Training Squadron of the Fleet Fighter School, in 1941, initially using Fairey Fulmar and later Supermarine Spitfire. The squadron moved to HMS Dipper, RNAS Henstridge, adding different variants of Spitfire and Seafire and it remained there until January 1946, when the squadron disbanded.

== History ==
=== Naval Air Fighter School (1941–1946) ===
761 Naval Air Squadron formed, on 1 August 1941, at RNAS Yeovilton (HMS Heron) near Yeovil, Somerset. It was formed out of 760 Naval Air Squadron's Fairey Fulmar, a carrier-based reconnaissance/fighter aircraft and tasked as the Advanced Training Squadron of the Fleet Fighter School, and it used RNAS Haldon (HMS Heron II) for air firing practice. During 1942, Blackburn Roc, a carrier-based turret fighter aircraft and Supermarine Spitfire I, a single-seat fighter aircraft, were received by the squadron.

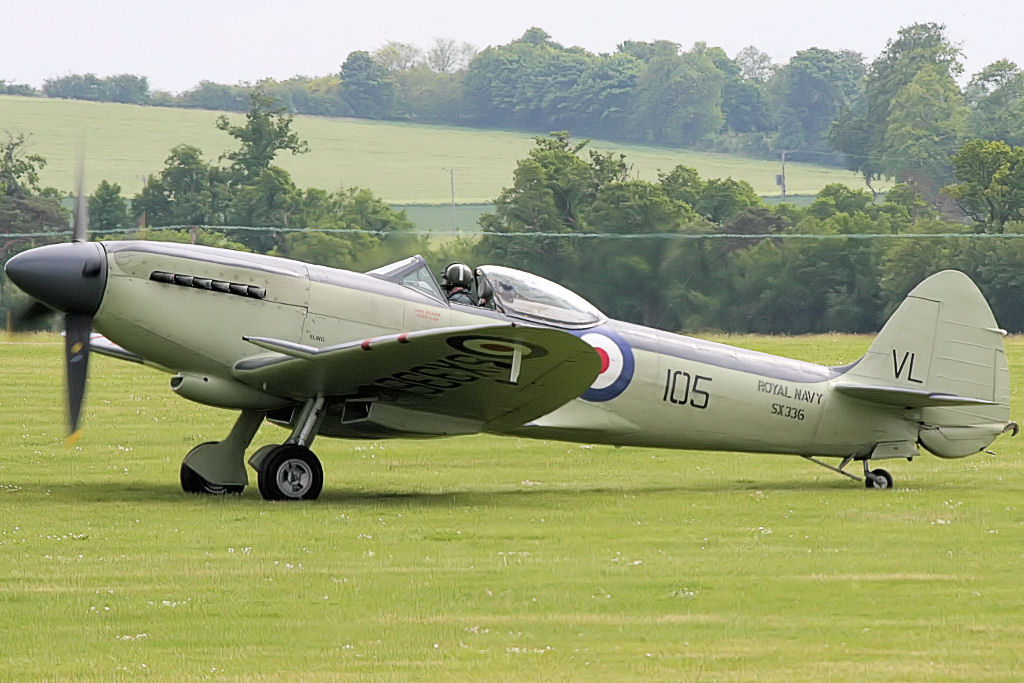
Supermarine Seafire, an example of the type used by 761 NAS

On 10 April 1943, 761 Naval Air Squadron relocated to RNAS Henstridge (HMS Dipper), situated near Henstridge, in Somerset, as part of No.2 Naval Air Fighter School. At this point, the squadron was equipped with a mix of eighteen Supermarine Spitfire and Supermarine Seafire, the latter a navalised Spitfire fighter aircraft, along with six Miles Master, an advanced trainer aircraft.

Utilising 'D' Flight, trainees went about real deck landing training on the Attacker-class escort carrier, HMS Ravager, and the aircraft carrier, (converted from an ocean liner), HMS Argus. Supermarine Seafire was the main aircraft operated by the squadron and by June 1944, sixty-eight Supermarine Seafire fighter aircraft were being used, consisting various marks.

761 Naval Air Squadron disbanded at RNAS Henstridge (HMS Dipper) on 16 January 1946.

== Aircraft operated ==
The squadron has operated a number of different aircraft types, including:

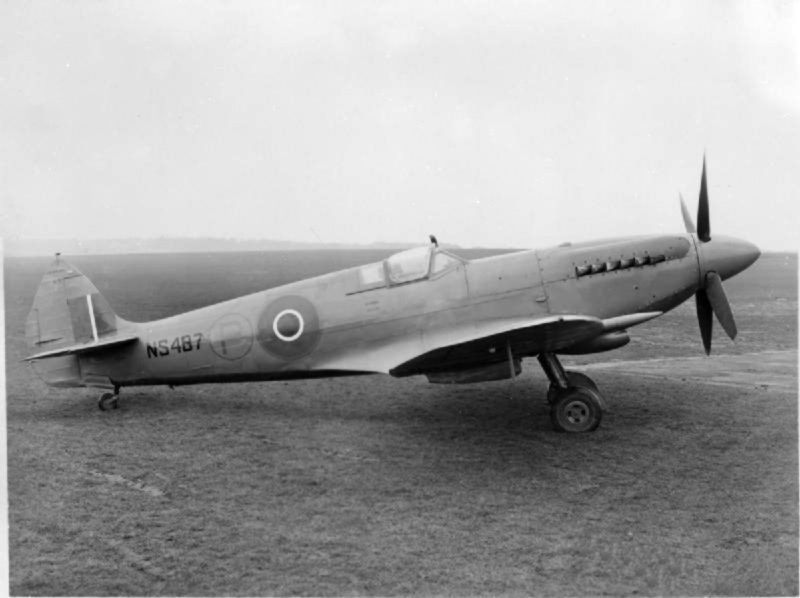
Supermarine Seafire Mk XV

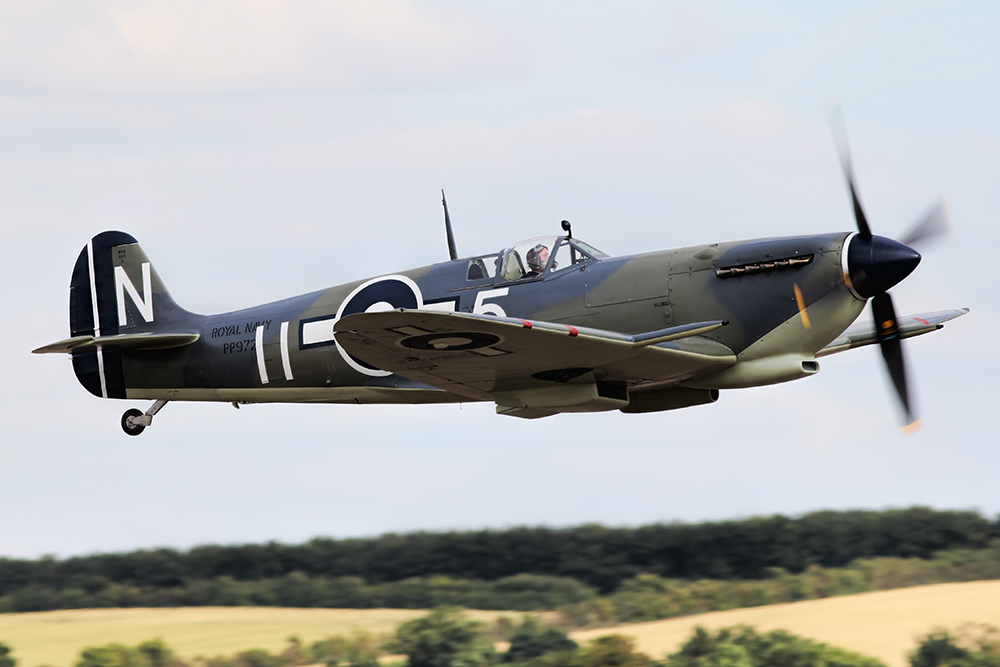
Supermarine Seafire Mk III

- Fairey Fulmar Mk.I reconnaissance/fighter aircraft (August 1941 - April 1943)
- Fairey Fulmar Mk.II reconnaissance/fighter aircraft (August 1941 - April 1943)
- Blackburn Roc I fighter aircraft (April 1942 - July 1942)
- Supermarine Spitfire Mk I fighter aircraft (September 1942 - July 1944)
- Miles Master I advanced trainer (April 1943 - November 1943)
- Miles Master II advanced trainer (April 1943 - January 1946)
- Supermarine Seafire Mk Ib fighter aircraft (April 1943 - March 1945)
- Supermarine Spitfire Mk Va fighter aircraft (April 1943 - January 1945)
- Supermarine Spitfire Mk Vb fighter aircraft (April 1943 - January 1945)
- Supermarine Spitfire Mk Vb "hooked" fighter aircraft (November 1943 - February 1945)
- Supermarine Seafire Mk III fighter aircraft (April 1944 - January 1946)
- Supermarine Seafire F Mk IIc fighter aircraft (July 1944 - August 1945)
- North American Harvard III advanced trainer (November 1944 - January 1946)
- Supermarine Seafire F Mk XV fighter aircraft (July 1945 - January 1946)
- Supermarine Seafire F Mk XVII fighter aircraft (November 1945 - January 1946)

== Naval air stations ==
761 Naval Air Squadron operated from a couple of naval air stations of the Royal Navy, in England:

- Royal Naval Air Station Yeovilton (HMS Heron), Somerset, (1 August 1941 - 10 April 1943)
- Royal Naval Air Station Henstridge (HMS Dipper), Somerset, (10 April 1943 - 16 January 1946)
  - 'D' Flight DLT
    - HMS Ravager (1 - 5 May 1944 / 18 - 20 May 1944)
    - HMS Argus (26 - 27 August 1944)
    - HMS Ravager (27 January - 2 February 1945 / 21 - 22 June 1945 / 18 - 23 August 1945)
- disbanded - (16 January 1946)

== Commanding officers ==
List of commanding officers of 761 Naval Air Squadron with date of appointment:

- Lieutenant C.P. Campbell-Horsefall, RN, from 1 August 1941
- Captain R.C. Hay, DSC, RM, from 1 January 1942
- Lieutenant(A) R.B. Pearson, RN, from 21 July 1942
- Lieutenant(A) W.C. Simpson, RNVR, from 12 September 1942
- Lieutenant A.C. Wallace, RN, from October 1942
- not identified, from November 1942
- Lieutenant Commander(A) R.J. Cork, DSO, DSC, RN, from 10 April 1943
- Lieutenant Commander(A) R.H.P. Carver, DSC, RN, from 15 November 1943
- Lieutenant Commander(A) S.G. Orr, DSC & Two Bars, RNVR, from 20 September 1944
- Lieutenant Commander(A) P.N. Charlton, DFC, RN, from 27 April 1946
- disbanded - 16 January 1946

Note: Abbreviation (A) signifies Air Branch of the RN or RNVR.
