= Church of St John the Baptist, Horsington =

Church in Somerset, England

Church of St John the Baptist
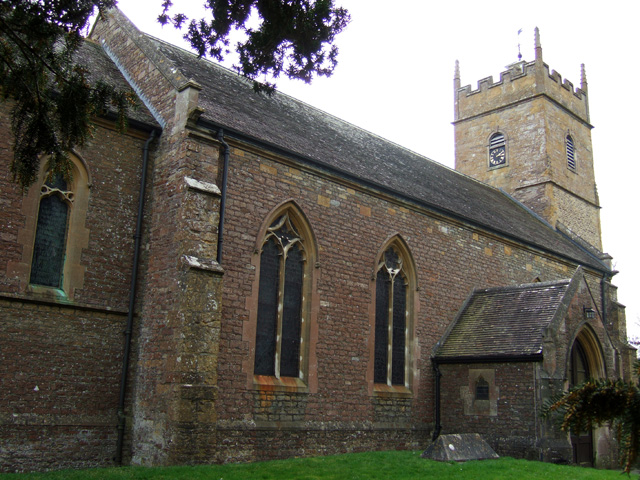

- Location within Somerset
- 51.0134°N 2.4248°W
- Location: Horsington, Somerset, England

History
- Built: 15th century. Rebuilt 1885 to 1887

Listed Building – Grade II*
- Official name: Church of St John the Baptist
- Designated: 24 March 1961
- Reference no.: 1238063

The Anglican Church of St John the Baptist in Horsington, Somerset, England was built in the 15th century and rebuilt between 1885 and 1887. It is a Grade II* listed building.

== History ==
The church was built in the 15th century and fragments, particularly the north wall of the nave remain from that date, however most of the church was rebuilt in a Victorian restoration during the 1880s.

In 2015 part of the floor was replaced and new toilet and servery was installed.

The parish is part of the Abbas and Templecombe, Henstridge and Horsington benefice within the Diocese of Bath and Wells.

== Architecture ==
The stone building has hamstone dressings and clay tile roofs. It has a five-bay nave and three-bay chancel with a south aisle. The west tower is supported by diagonal corner buttresses. The uppermost stage was added in 1738 while the lower stages are from the 15th and 16th centuries.

Inside the church is an octagonal font from around 1400 however most of the interior is from the 19th century including the stained glass window by Charles Eamer Kempe.

== See also ==
- List of ecclesiastical parishes in the Diocese of Bath and Wells
