= Stalbridge =

Town and civil parish in Dorset, England

Coordinates: 50.9594°N 2.3784°W

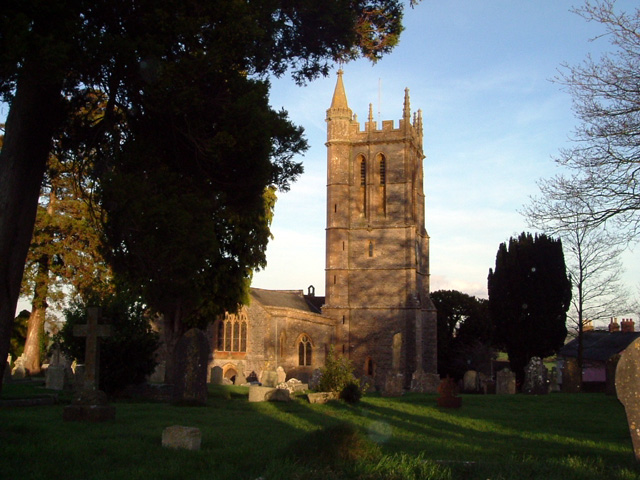
- St Mary's Church

- Location within Dorset
- Interactive map of Stalbridge
- Population: 2,668 (2021)
- OS grid reference: ST735177
- Unitary authority: Dorset
- Ceremonial county: Dorset
- Region: South West
- Country: England
- Sovereign state: United Kingdom
- Post town: Sturminster Newton
- Postcode district: DT10
- Dialling code: 01963
- Police: Dorset
- Fire: Dorset and Wiltshire
- Ambulance: South Western
- UK Parliament: North Dorset
- Website: Stalbridge Council

Stalbridge (/ˈstɔːlbrɪdʒ/) is a town and civil parish in Dorset, England, situated in the Blackmore Vale, near the border with Somerset. In the 2021 census the civil parish—which includes the hamlets of Stalbridge Weston, and Thornhill—had 1,224 households and a population of 2,668. The nearest towns are Sturminster Newton, four miles (six kilometres) southeast, Sherborne, 6 mi (10 km) west, and Shaftesbury, 7 mi (11 km) northeast. Stalbridge is situated on the A357 on a low limestone ridge, one mile (1.5 kilometres) west of the River Stour. It officially became a town in April 1992.

Though relatively small, Stalbridge has its own independent supermarket, dispensing pharmacy, dentist and optician, as well as many other services, reflecting its catchment area of surrounding farms and hamlets. It is also home to the local free newspaper, the Blackmore Vale Magazine.

== History ==
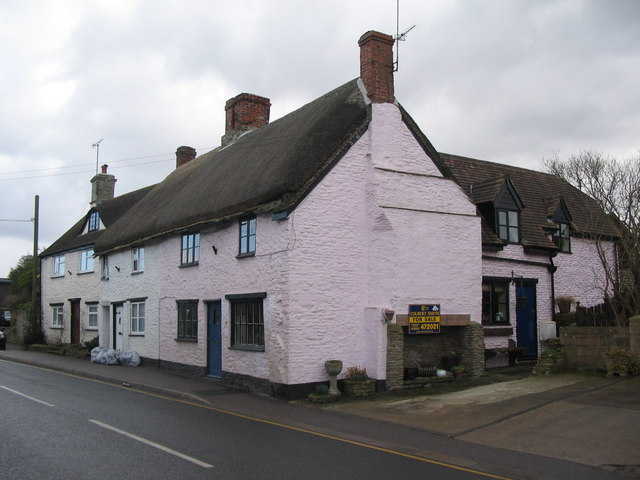
Thatched cottage at Stalbridge

The name Stalbridge derives from the Old English stapolbrycg meaning 'post bridge'.

There was a settlement near Stalbridge in Roman times. The town has a 15th-century church with a 19th-century tower, dedicated to Saint Mary and restored to designs by T. H. Wyatt, in 1878, which overlooks the town from a hill. The town has had market rights since the time of King George I, though it has not held a regular market for many years. In the town centre stands a 10-metre (30 ft) tall market cross, said to be the finest in the country.

Stalbridge was home to scientist Robert Boyle (see below), and writer Douglas Adams, who wrote much of The Hitchhiker's Guide to the Galaxy in the town. In 2026, Stalbridge celebrated the life, work and global impact of Douglas Adams, by holding a DON’T PANIC Festival in the town on 23 to 25 May which is Towel Day, the international day of celebration of Adams and his work. The town also boasts that it is home to the oldest living male twins in the world.

Artist Sir James Thornhill lived just south of the town, in Thornhill Park, which he bought in 1725. The house is believed to have been originally owned by Sir Walter Raleigh in the 16th century. In 1727, Sir James Thornhill erected an obelisk in the park to honour the accession of King George II.

From September 1863 Stalbridge was served by Stalbridge railway station on the Somerset and Dorset Joint Railway, with trains to Bath and Bournemouth. During World War II a Ministry of Food depot was situated here. The last train ran on 7 March 1966, and most of the tracks, station and goods yard have been replaced, though tracks still cross the road.

=== Stalbridge House ===
In 1618 Mervyn Tuchet, 2nd Earl of Castlehaven, who had inherited Stalbridge Park from his father, decided to build a mansion house on his Stalbridge estate. He enclosed an area used as common land to the northwest of the church, moving tenant farmers out, and built a Jacobean style mansion, the fifth largest house in Dorset.

In 1631 the earl's eldest son James brought a case against him for "unnatural practices", and he was subsequently executed.

James sold the house to Richard Boyle, 1st Earl of Cork. After his father's death, the scientist Robert Boyle became Lord of the manor, and the house was his residence between 1644 and 1652. It was here that he conducted many of his experiments.

At some point during the house's history a 2-metre-high (6 ft 7 in) stone wall was built around the boundary of Stalbridge Park. There is some argument as to when and why the wall was built. It may have been commissioned by Castlehaven as a status symbol, work for French prisoners of war during the Napoleonic Wars, or as work for local labourers in times of high unemployment.

By 1822 the house was in poor repair and the owner, Henry Paget, 1st Marquess of Anglesey, had it demolished. By 1827 all that remained was the raised area where it had stood. The stone was sold off and much of it is in use elsewhere in the town, including the large farm house which now stands in the park.

There are many popular local myths and ghost stories about the demise of the house, mostly involving a fire destroying the house.

Stalbridge Park features in Thomas Hardy's Wessex as "Stapleford Park".

== Governance ==
Stalbridge is part of the North Dorset parliamentary constituency.

Stalbridge is part of the Stalbridge and Marnhull electoral ward, which elects 1 member to Dorset Council.

Historically, Stalbridge was in Sturminster Rural District from 1894 to 1974, and North Dorset district from 1974 to 2019.

== Demographics ==
Census population of Stalbridge parish
Census	Population	Households
2001	2,579	
2011	2,698	1,160
2021	2,668	1,224

== Geography ==
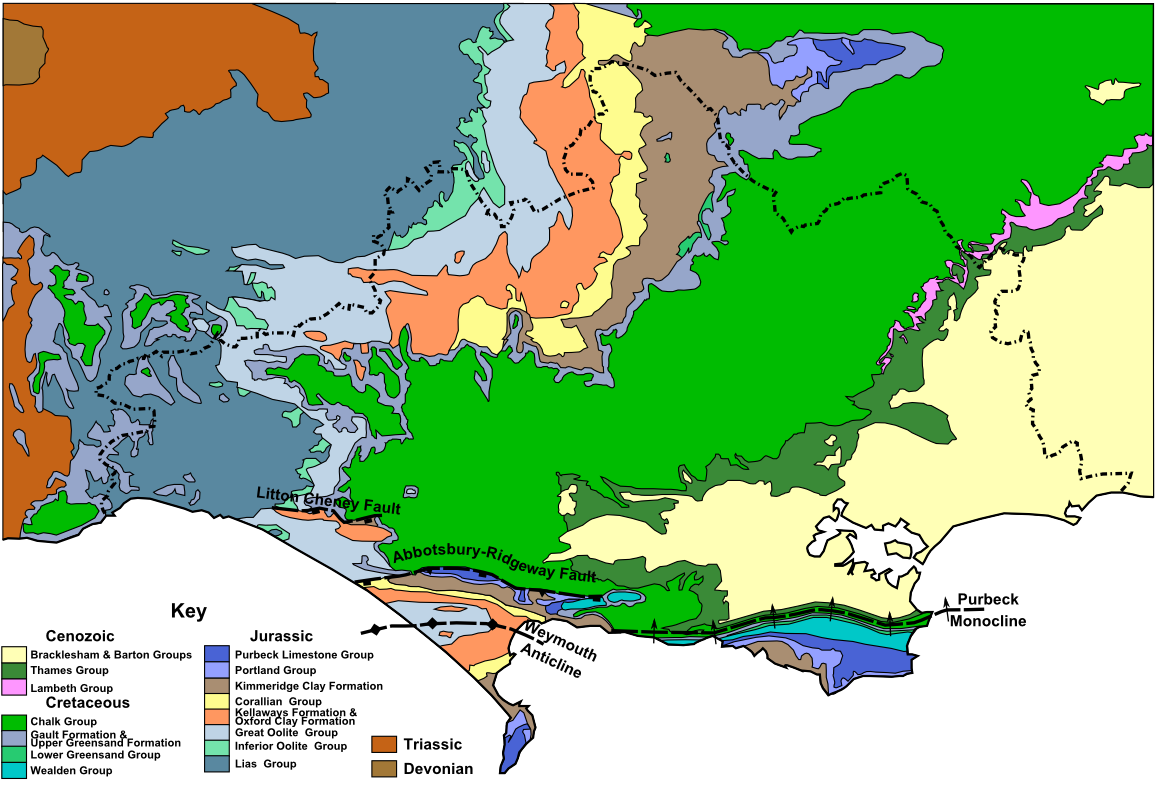
Geological map of Dorset. Stalbridge lies on Great Oolite clay.

Stalbridge lies in the Blackmore Vale. As an area of hills, this means that the town lies largely on a gradient. The high street through the town centre follows the contour of the landscape, before climbing up Church Hill past the parish church of St. Mary, heading towards the Somerset border and Henstridge. To the east of the high street, Station Road heads down the hill, heading towards the Stalbridge trading estates, passing the modern housing estates built in the 1970s. To the West, the town climbs Barrow Hill, with older housing, some estates dating to the 1950s, and the 1990s Pond Walk. There are two parks in Stalbridge, the larger of which is situated on Barrow hill, and hosts a football field and a cricket pitch, as well as two tennis courts. This park also has an outdoor playset. The smaller park functions largely as an outdoor playset, with two slides, a small football pitch and other toys.

There are several footpaths and bridleways in Stalbridge. A trailway follows the route of the disused Somerset and Dorset Joint Railway. It passes through the Stalbridge Nature Reserve, and has a hard pack surface suitable for cycles, including hybrid bicycles, or even endurance road bicycles.
