= Church of St Nicholas, Henstridge =

Church in Somerset, England

Church of St Nicholas
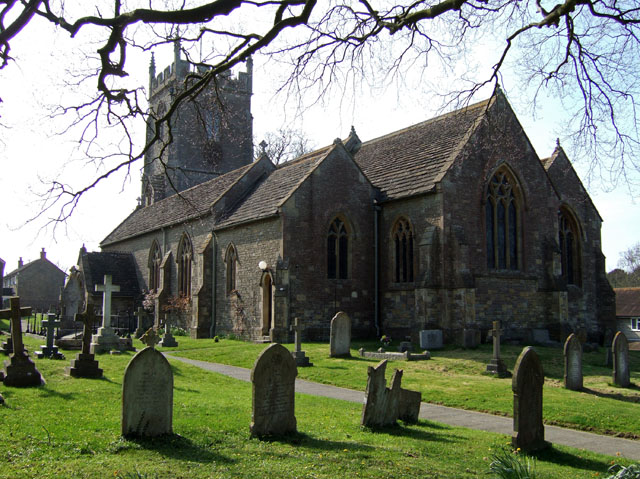

- Location within Somerset
- 50.9766°N 2.3962°W
- Location: Henstridge, Somerset, England

History
- Built: 12th century

Listed Building – Grade II*
- Official name: Church of St Nicholas
- Designated: 24 March 1961
- Reference no.: 1366325

The Church of St Nicholas in Henstridge, Somerset, England was built in the 12th century. It is a Grade II* listed building.

== History ==
The church was built in the 12th century. It underwent significant Victorian restoration between 1872 and 1873 by James Mountford Allen. The tower was rebuilt in 1900.

The parish is part of the benefice of Abbas and Templecombe, Henstridge and Horsington within the Diocese of Bath and Wells.

== Architecture ==
The stone building has hamstone dressings and stone slate roofs. It has a four-bay nave and three-bay chancel with north and south aisles. The three-stage west tower is supported by corner buttresses. The tower has six bells the oldest of which dates from 1615. The lychgate is one of the memorials to the dead of World War I in the village.

The interior fittings are mostly from the 19th century but the font is from the 13th century and some of the original arches have survived the 19th century restoration. A tomb from 1463 with recumbent figures was reinstalled in the church after the restoration.

== See also ==
- List of ecclesiastical parishes in the Diocese of Bath and Wells
