= Rainbow Play Systems =

Play Equipment Manufacturer

- Company type: Private
- Industry: Outdoor playset
- Founded: 1985
- Founder: Greg Foster
- Headquarters: Brookings South Dakota, USA
- Area served: Worldwide
- Products: Outdoor playset

Rainbow Play Systems is a manufacturer of children's play equipment which are available through a network of over 200 retail outlets throughout the United States, Canada, United Kingdom, Mexico, Spain, Panama, Italy and Belarus.

== History ==
Founded by Greg Foster in 1985 as a small custom job shop in Minnesota, the company has expanded. Foster founded the company when he was 18 years old.

Due to its network of independent distributors, the company expanded across the United States throughout the 1990s. It currently operates out of a 1,300,000-square-foot (120,000 m^{2}) manufacturing facility on 130 acres (0.53 km^{2}) in Brookings, South Dakota. According to the company, it has 150 employees, plus over 200 dealerships across the world.

=== White House Swing Set ===
One prominent customer of Rainbow Play Systems was the Obama family. On March 4, 2009, a swing set manufactured by the company was placed on the south lawn just outside the Oval Office of the White House, as a surprise for Malia and Sasha, the Obama daughters. This was the first playset on the White House lawn since the 1960s, during John F. Kennedy's presidency. According to Rainbow Play CEO Greg Foster, the White House's chief usher "did his research first on the Internet and narrowed it down to three or four companies", before choosing Rainbow Play.

Before leaving the White House, the Obama family offered the swing set to the Trump family, who refused it, as the only Trump child who would use it would not be moving into the White House. The swing set was then donated to a local D.C. charity.

== United Kingdom ==
Rainbow Play Systems in the United Kingdom operates from the main headquarters in Bagshot, Surrey and from 1 other Sales Office in Wilmslow.

== Pandemic Impact ==
The COVID-19 pandemic reportedly resulted in higher sales of swing sets, including Rainbow Play play sets, due to more time being spent at home by families and children. According to the Chicago Tribune, Rainbow Play play sets had a four-week wait for most orders at the height of the pandemic.
