= Horsington House =

Coordinates: 51.0118°N 2.4247°W

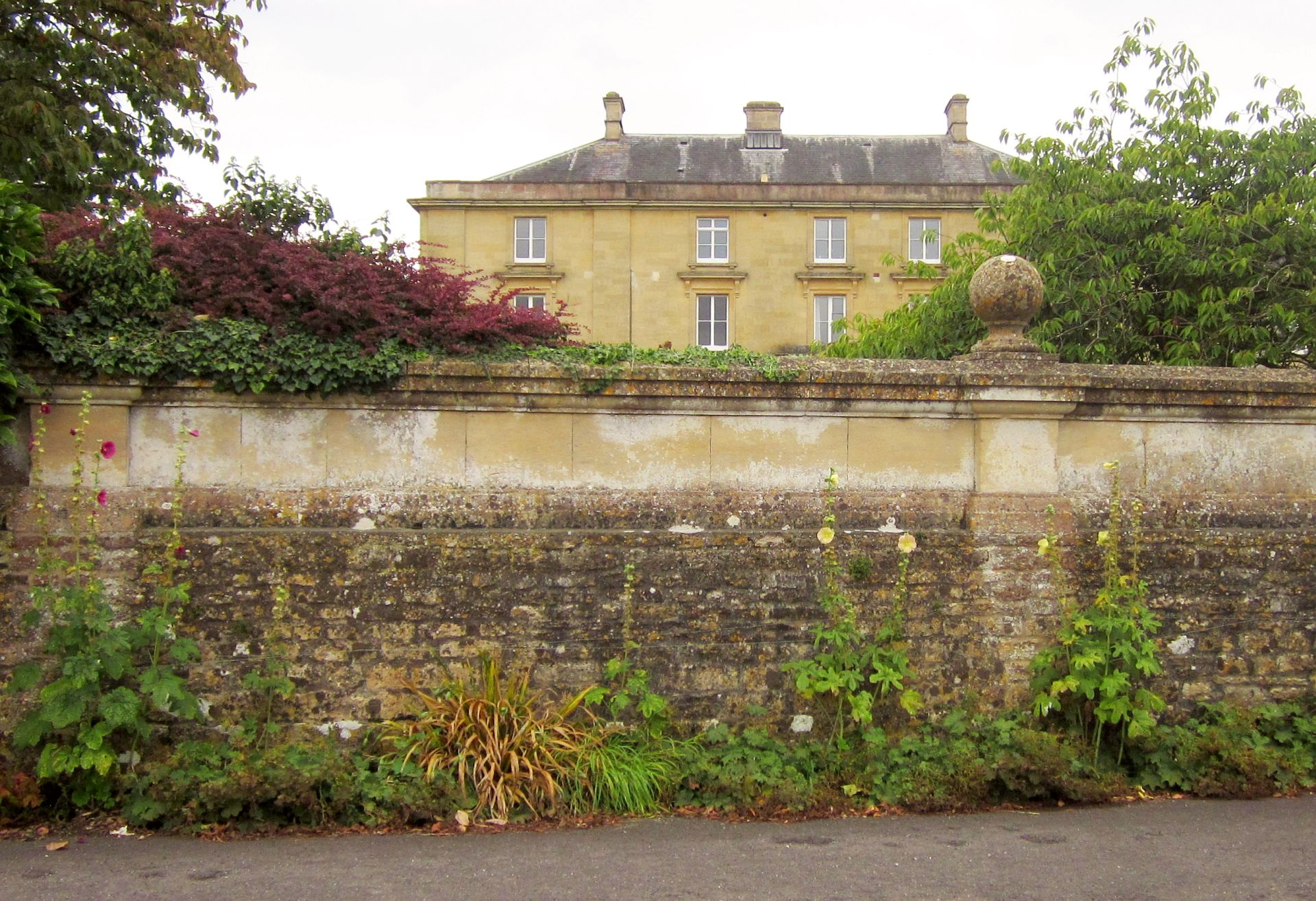
Horsington House

Horsington House is a country house in Horsington, near Templecombe in Somerset. It is a stone-built house with pillared porch, built in 1839. It is a Grade II listed building.

The estate was the home of the Dodington family from around 1790 to 1922. The three-storey Doulting stone house built in 1839 has five bays on the front with a pediment supported by doric columns over the central porch.

In 1939 the house and park were sold by Catherine Campbell Noyes to Malvern Girls' College. The charity Barnardo's used it as a children's home from 1946 until July 1972. Subsequently Horsington House became an hotel. It is now, once again, owned privately.
