= Henstridge (disambiguation) =

Henstridge is a village and civil parish in Somerset, England. It may also refer to:

== People ==
- Natasha Henstridge (born 1974), Canadian actress and fashion model
- Elizabeth Henstridge (born 1987), English actress
- The Henstridge family, a fictional family in The Royals (TV series)
