= RNAS Henstridge =

Former Royal Naval Air Station in Somerset, England

RNAS Henstridge HMS Dipper
- Henstridge airfield
- Henstridge, Somerset in England
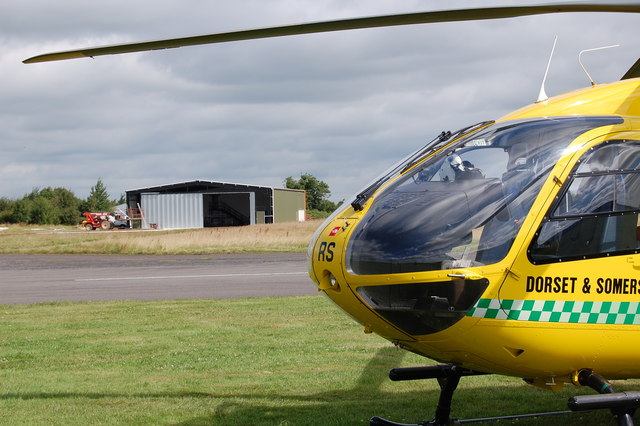
- Dorset And Somerset Air Ambulance at Henstridge in 2008

Site information
- Type: Royal Naval Air Station
- Owner: Air Ministry
- Operator: Royal Navy
- Controlled by: Fleet Air Arm
- Condition: Limited civil aviation

Location
- Shown within Somerset RNAS Henstridge (the United Kingdom)
- Coordinates: 50°58′59″N 002°21′17″W

Site history
- Built: 1941-1943
- Built by: Wilson Lovatt and sons London
- In use: 1943-1958
- Fate: Civil Aviation / Industry

Airfield information
- Identifiers: ICAO: EGHS
- Elevation: 53 metres (174 ft) AMSL
Runways
Direction	Length and surface
03/21	914 metres (2,999 ft) Tarmac
07/25 N	914 metres (2,999 ft) Tarmac / Concrete
07/25 S	914 metres (2,999 ft) Tarmac
11/29	1,010 metres (3,310 ft) Tarmac
16/34	914 metres (2,999 ft) Tarmac

Royal Naval Air Station Henstridge, more commonly known as RNAS Henstridge; (commissioned HMS Dipper) is a former Royal Navy Naval Air Station, located 7 miles (11 km) west of Shaftesbury, in Dorset and 12.4 miles (20 km) east of Yeovil, in Somerset, in South West England. It is home to the Dorset and Somerset Air Ambulance.

== Units ==
A number of units were here at some point:

- 24th Naval Fighter Wing
- 718 Naval Air Squadron 5 June 1944 – 17 August 1945
- 748 Naval Air Squadron 4 February 1944 – 9 March 1944
- 760 Naval Air Squadron 27 December 1945 – 23 January 1946
- 761 Naval Air Squadron 10 April 1943- 1 May 1944 The first squadron to move in.
- 767 Naval Air Squadron 4 January 1952 – 19 January 1952 Moved from Yeovilton during re-surfacing works.
- 794 Naval Air Squadron 22 November 1943 – 1 December 1943
- 799 Naval Air Squadron 17 December 1945 – 23 January 1946
- 808 Naval Air Squadron 7 March 1944 – 31 March 1944/11 April 1944 – 22 April 1944
- 885 Naval Air Squadron 31 March 1944 – 22 April 1944
- 886 Naval Air Squadron 11 March 1944 – 25 April 1944 / 4 May 1944 – 6 May 1944
- 887 Naval Air Squadron 13 December 1943 – 8 January 1944
- 894 Naval Air Squadron 19 October 1943 – 8 January 1944
- 897 Naval Air Squadron 2 March 1944 – 11 April 1944 / 22 April 1944 – 6 May 1944

== Current use ==
Henstridge Airfield EGHS The current airfield is operated by EGHS and is an unlicensed airfield. The only usable runway is 06/24 tarmac/concrete 750 m long x 6 m wide. Henstridge radio can be contacted on 130.255 MHz, it can be found at the south eastern stub of the Yeovilton MATZ

== History ==
The main part of the land (355 acres) was purchased in August 1941, after which building of the airfield and the marsh lane accommodation site commenced. It was commissioned on 1 April 1943 as HMS Dipper, principally as number 2 naval fighter school. On 11 September 1942, another 18 acres was acquired at the adjoining Gibbs Marsh area for an aircraft repair and maintenance site. The design and lay-out of the airfield was unique, having 5 runways, 2 of these being east west lay-out (07-25), both 1000 yards long. The northern runway incorporated a dummy deck landing strip, complete with under-ground arresting gear with four above ground arrestor wires, which was a duplicate of that installed on HMS Implacable for training of aircraft carrier landings, these mainly being carried out with the Seafire, a naval version of the Spitfire with folding wings. The site also had its own cinema and stage hall

== Post-war ==
In March 1952, the airfield became inactive and was placed under care and maintenance. During 1953, Air Whaling (now Bristow group) used the facilities for repairs to the whaling fleet of helicopters until they moved out in June 1958. In June 1957, it was finally closed as a naval establishment. From 1958-1960 the entire site was sold off. On 27 June 1980, the BBC purchased the whole site and applied for planning permission to erect at the airfield a shortwave radio station consisting of 21 self-supporting towers holding aerial arrays and ancillary buildings on a 300-acre site. The station would transmit overseas radio services to Eastern Europe, the Soviet Union and perhaps South America. The application failed, and the BBC sold the land during January 1987. The airfield is also the home of the Wessex Strut, a general aviation club formed in January 1977, which holds an annual fly-in and other events. Their first fly-in was on 17 April 1977 and attracted 107 aircraft. As of today, the only usable runway is the north 06-24 runway, extant with the concrete dummy deck, and the underground arrestor cable machinery chambers. The site is also the home to a large number of light aviation enthusiasts’ aircraft as well as the Yakolevs aerobatic display team, the Dorset and Somerset Air Ambulance and, in September 2018, Henstridge Airfield parkrun was launched, offering a free 5-kilometre (3.1 mi) run/walk/jog taking place at 9 am every Saturday morning. The parkrun ceased running in September 2023.

== See also ==
- List of air stations of the Royal Navy
