= Yenston Priory =

Priory in Henstridge, Somerset, England

Coordinates: 50.9887°N 2.4107°W

Yenston Priory was a Benedictine priory in Henstridge, Somerset, England.

It was a cell of the Abbey of Sever in Normandy, France. It was founded by Hugh d'Avranches, 1st Earl of Chester, who died around 1100 and was also known as Hugh Abrincus, and Hugh Lupus. In 1158 the abbey was confirmed by Pope Adrian IV.

Around 1468 it was granted to Eton College. The buildings had been demolished before 1450. and later by Edward Seymour, 1st Duke of Somerset. After the dissolution of the monasteries the land was held by Sir Thomas Bell.

Stone from the priory was used to build Monmouth House in the village, and traces of its buildings may remain in the outhouses. There are also surface marks in surrounding fields, however these may not be from the building itself but from the excavation of stone.
