= 718 Naval Air Squadron =

Inactive flying squadron of the Royal Navy's Fleet Air Arm

718 Naval Air Squadron ~~718 (Catapult) Flight FAA~~
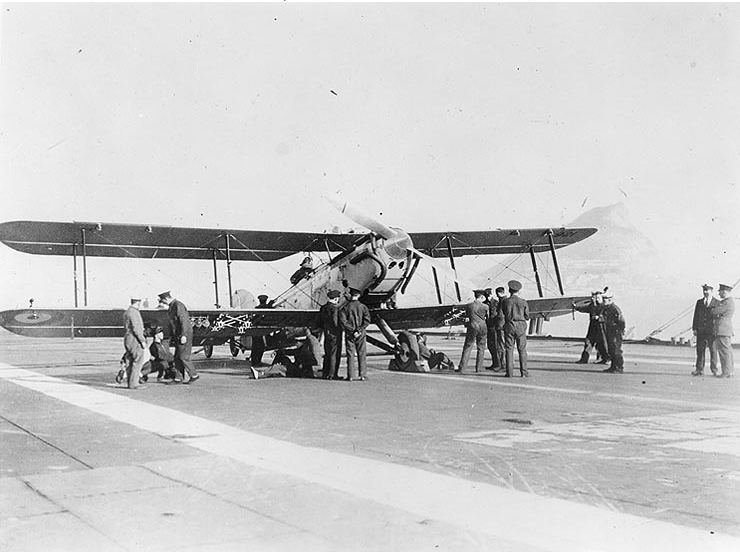
- A Fairey III similar to ones used by the 718 NAS in 1936.
- Active: Royal Air Force; 1936–1939; Royal Navy: 1939–1940; 1944–1945; 1946–1947; 1955–1955
- Disbanded: 31 December 1955
- Country: United Kingdom
- Branch: Royal Navy
- Type: Fleet Air Arm Second Line Squadron
- Role: Catapult Flight; Army Co-operation Training Unit; No.4 Naval Air Fighting School; Seafire conversion squadron; Jet conversion squadron
- Size: Squadron
- Part of: Fleet Air Arm
- Home station: See Naval air stations section for full list.
- Aircraft: See Aircraft flown section for full list.

Commanders
- Notable commanders: Lieutenant(A) R.M. Crosley, DSC & Bar, RN

Insignia
- Identification Markings: 769, 780-781 (Fairey IIIF); 790-791 (Osprey); 768, 769 & 780 (Walrus); N9A+ (Seafox & Walrus May 1939); BH1A+ (Seafire/Spitfire); BH2A+ (Corsair); 160-173 (Attacker); 260-264 (Sea Vampire)
- Fin Shore Code: ST (Attacker & Sea Vampire)

718 Naval Air Squadron (718 NAS), sometime referred to as 718 Squadron, is an inactive, Fleet Air Arm (FAA) naval air squadron of the United Kingdom’s Royal Navy (RN). It was last active to train RNVR pilots on jet aircraft during 1955, operating with Supermarine Attacker FB.2 jet fighter-bomber and de Havilland Sea Vampire T.22 jet trainer aircraft.

It was initially created in July 1936 to serve as a Catapult Flight of the Fleet Air Arm. It was elevated to squadron status at the end of 1937, before being disbanded in January 1940. It was re-formed in June 1944 to operate as the Army Co-operation Naval Operational Training Unit but changed to a new role as the School of Naval Air Reconnaissance, before being disbanded again in November 1945.

In August 1946 it was reformed for the third time to operate as a Seafire Conversion Squadron, operating Supermarine Seafire, but was disbanded less than one year later, in March 1947.

== History ==
=== Initial formation ===
718 NAS originally came into being as a flight-sized unit following a renumbering of No. 443 (Fleet Reconnaissance) Flight RAF and operated in the 8th Cruiser Squadron in the America and West Indies Station.

The unit was initially equipped with Fairey IIIFs and Hawker Ospreys and was stationed aboard the Leander-class light cruisers HMS Apollo and HMS Ajax and the York-class heavy cruisers HMS Exeter and HMS York. The unit began to re-equip with six Fairey Seafox reconnaissance floatplane and six Supermarine Walrus amphibious maritime patrol aircraft, with the final Hawker Osprey being replaced in 1937. At the end of the year the unit was granted Squadron-status whilst stationed at Royal Naval Air Station Bermuda.

=== Second World War ===
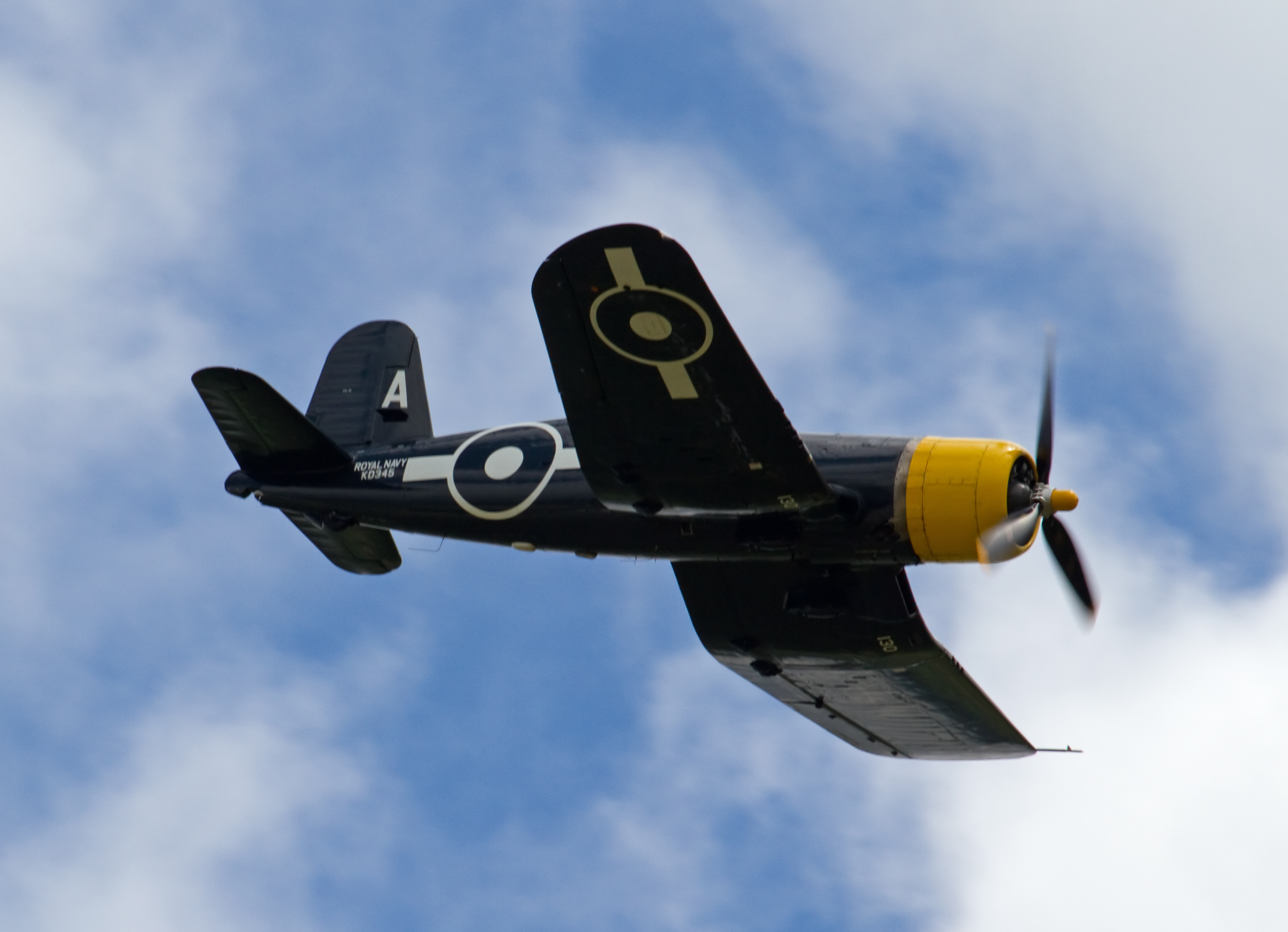
A Vought Corsair; similar to ones used by the unit in 1945.

At the onset of the Second World War, the squadron was deploying five Supermarine Walrus and five Fairey Seafox aircraft across six cruisers. The departure of HMS Apollo from the station was offset by the arrival of the County-class heavy cruiser HMS Berwick, the Leander-class light cruiser HMS Orion and modified Leander-class light cruiser HMAS Perth. During the Battle of the River Plate on 13 December 1939, HMS Ajax's Flight observed the impact of enemy fire, which resulted in the squadron receiving its sole Battle Honour.

Not long after the war began, on 21 January 1940, the squadron was merged into 700 Naval Air Squadron.

=== Army Co-operation Training Unit ===
Four years later, on 5 June 1944, the squadron was reformed to operate as an Army Co-operation Training Unit, with its base at RNAS Henstridge (HMS Dipper), Somerset. It was equipped with six Supermarine Spitfire PR Mk XII, a photo-reconnaissance variant of the fighter aircraft along with nine Supermarine Seafire F Mk III, a navalised version of the Supermarine Spitfire. In its role as an Army Co-operation Training Unit the unit trained new pilots in a variety of tactical reconnaissance techniques so they could replace experienced pilots on already on deployment. They also operated an Air Combat course.

=== No.4 Naval Air Fighting School ===
The following year the unit was operating in a new role as the School of Naval Air Reconnaissance, but was rebased, on 17 August 1945, to RNAS Ballyhalbert (HMS Corncrake), County Down, Northern Ireland and had its role change again, this time to the No.4 Naval Air Fighting School.

In this context, Vought Corsair, an American carrier-borne fighter-bomber, took the place of the Supermarine Spitfire PR Mk XIII aircraft, with additional North American Harvard training aircraft and Miles Martinet aircraft incorporated to provide target towing facilities. The squadron was disbanded in November, with the Vought Corsair aircraft being abandoned at sea from HMS Ranger, while the remaining aircraft were transferred to 794 Naval Air Squadron at RNAS Eglinton, County Londonderry.

=== Seafire conversion unit ===
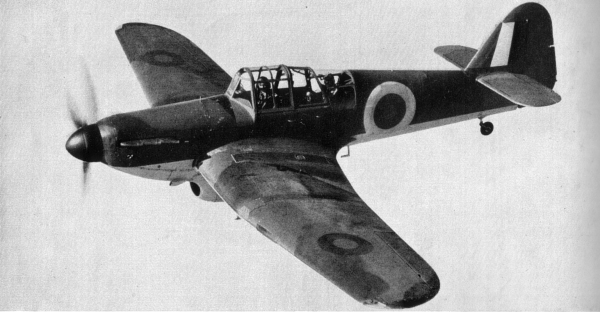
A Miles Master similar to ones used by the unit between 1946 and 1947.

On 23 August 1946, the squadron was reformed for the third time at RNAS Eglinton (HMS Gannet), County Londonderry, Northern Ireland, to operate as a Supermarine Seafire conversion squadron within the 51st Training Air Group, but was transferred to the 52nd Training Group in November of that year. In its role as a conversion squadron the unit worked with Supermarine Seafire L Mk.III fighter aircraft, alongside two types of advanced trainer aircraft: North American Harvard and Miles Master.

In November, the squadron underwent a transfer of its Commanding Officer and staff with 794 Naval Air Squadron, allowing them to gain embarked experience with the new squadron. On 17 March 1947, the squadron was disbanded for the penultimate time.

=== Jet conversion training ===
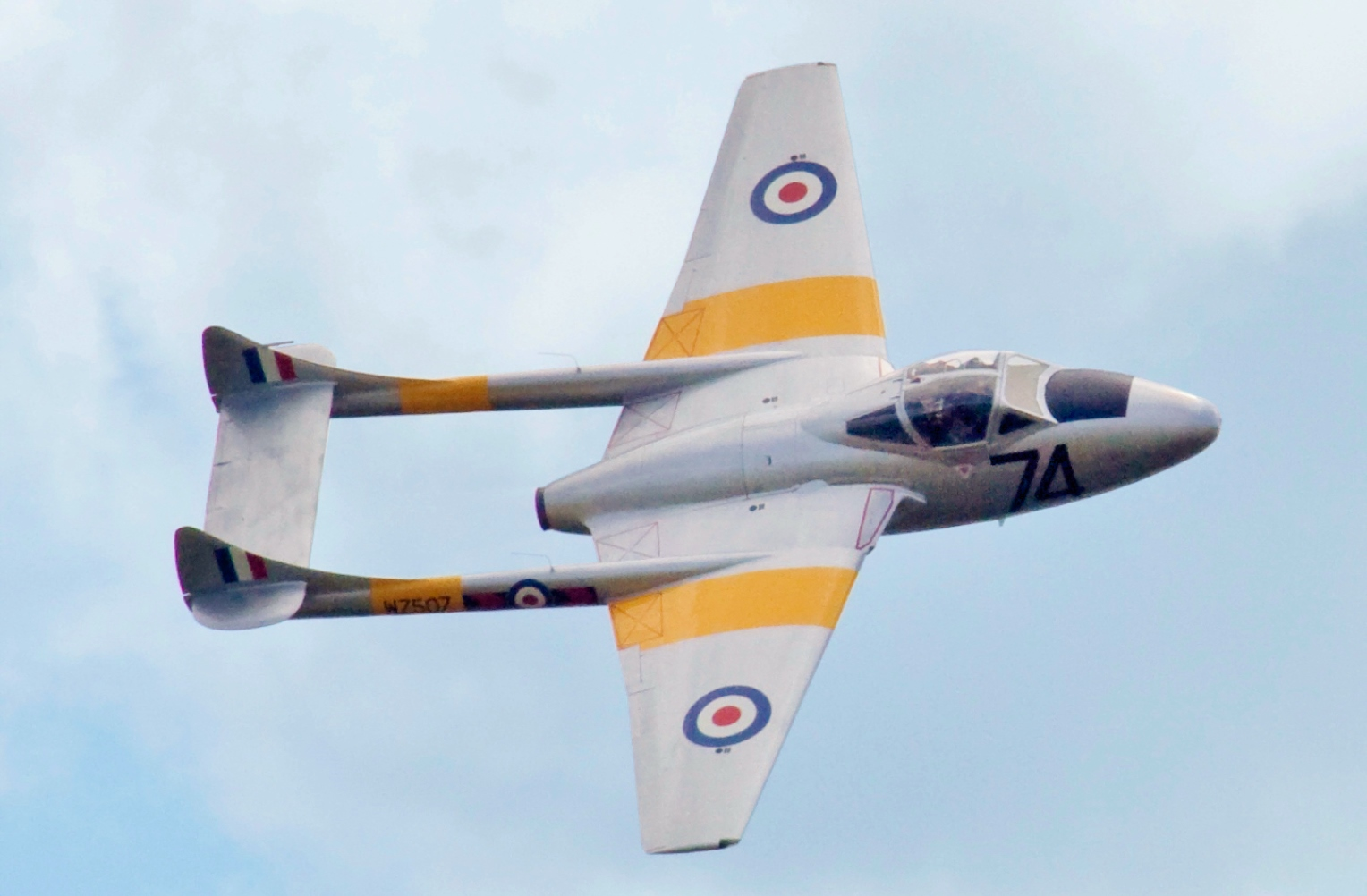
A de Havilland Sea Vampire similar to ones used by the unit in 1955.

Nearly ten years later, on 26 April 1955, the squadron was re-established at RNAS Stretton (HMS Blackcap), Cheshire. Its primary function was to train Royal Naval Volunteer Reserve pilots from 1831 Naval Air Squadron in operating the Supermarine Attacker, a naval jet fighter aircraft and the de Havilland Sea Vampire jet fighter aircraft.

Later in the year, the unit relocated to RAF Honiley, Warwickshire, to collaborate with 1833 Naval Air Squadron in fulfilling the same training responsibilities.

The unit was ultimately disbanded for the last time on 31 December 1955, having successfully completed its assigned tasks.

== Aircraft flown ==
The squadron operated a variety of different aircraft and versions:

- Fairey IIIF reconnaissance biplane (July - December 1936)
- Hawker Osprey FP spotter and reconnaissance floatplane (July 1936 - June 1938)
- Supermarine Walrus amphibious maritime patrol aircraft (October 1936 - January 1940)
- Fairey Seafox reconnaissance floatplane (August 1937 - January 1940)
- Supermarine Spitfire PR Mk XIII photo-reconnaissance aircraft (June 1944 - October 1945)
- Supermarine Seafire F Mk.III fighter aircraft (June 1944 - October 1945)
- Vought Corsair Mk IV fighter-bomber (June - October 1945)
- Vought Corsair Mk III fighter-bomber (August - October 1945)
- Supermarine Seafire Mk.IIc fighter aircraft (July - October 1945)
- Miles Martinet TT.Mk I target tug (August - October 1945)
- North American Harvard III advanced trainer aircraft (September - October 1945)
- Miles Master II advanced trainer aircraft (August - October 1946)
- Supermarine Seafire L Mk.III fighter aircraft (August - November 1946, November 1946 - March 1947)
- Supermarine Attacker FB.2 jet fighter-bomber (April - December 1955)
- de Havilland Sea Vampire T.22 jet trainer aircraft (April - December 1955)

== Assignments ==
718 Naval Air Squadron was assigned as needed to form part of larger unit:

- 51st Training Air Group (May - November 1946)
- 52nd Training Air Group (November 1946 - March 1947)

== Naval air stations ==
718 Naval Air Squadron operated from a number of naval air stations of the Royal Navy in the United Kingdom, one overseas and a Royal Air Force station:

1936 - 1940

- Royal Naval Air Station Bermuda, Bermuda, (15 July 1936 - 21 January 1940
- disbanded - 21 January 1940

1944 - 1945

- Royal Naval Air Station Henstridge (HMS Dipper), Dorset, (5 June 1944 - 17 August 1945)
- Royal Naval Air Station Ballyhalbert (HMS Corncrake), County Down, (17 August 1945 - 1 November 1945)
- disbanded - (1 November 1945)

1946 - 1947

- Royal Naval Air Station Eglinton (HMS Gannet), County Londonderry, (23 August 1946 - 17 March 1947)
- disbanded - (17 March 1947)

1955

- Royal Naval Air Station Stretton (HMS Blackcap), Cheshire, (25 April - 4 July 1955)
- Royal Air Force Honiley, Warwickshire, (4 July - 31 December 1955)
- disbanded (31 December 1955)

== Ships' Flights ==
List of Royal Navy cruisers where responsibility for the aircraft belonged to 714 Flight, between 1936 and 1940:

- HMS Apollo 1936-38
- HMS Ajax 1936-40
- HMS Exeter 1936-40
- HMS Orion 1937-40
- HMS Berwick 1938-40
- HMAS Perth 1939-40
- HMS York 1936-40

== Commanding officers ==
List of commanding officers of 718 Naval Air Squadron with date of appointment:

1936 - 1940

- Lieutenant T.W.T. Blackwell, RN, (Flight Lieutenant, RAF), from 15 July 1936
- Lieutenant Commander A.A. Murray, RN, (Squadron Leader, RAF), from 21 October 1936
- Lieutenant Commander J.C. Cockburn, RN, (Flight Lieutenant, RAF), from 29 March 1939
- disbanded - 21 January 1940

1944 - 1945

- Lieutenant Commander(A) W.H. Stevens, RN, from 5 June 1944
- Lieutenant Commander S.J. Hall, DSC, RN, from 26 November 1944
- disbanded - 1 November 1945

1946 - 1947

- Lieutenant(A) R.M. Crosley, DSC & Bar, RN, from 23 August 1946
- Lieutenant A.C. Lindsay, DSC, RN, from 13 November 1946
- disbanded - 17 March 1947

1955

- Lieutenant Commander W.G. Cook, RN, from 25 April 1955
- disbanded - 31 December 1955

Note: Abbreviation (A) signifies Air Branch of the RN or RNVR.
