= Manor House, Templecombe =

Historic building in Somerset, England

- Location within Somerset Location within England
- 50.9972°N 2.41600°W
- Location: Templecombe, Somerset, England

History
- Built: 17th century

Listed Building – Grade II*
- Designated: 24 March 1961
- Reference no.: 1056356

Manor House is a historic building in Templecombe, Somerset, England. Dating to the 17th century, but built on a medieval site—Templecombe Preceptory—it is now a Grade II* listed building. It is constructed of coursed rubble with ashlar dressings.

It was found by the archaeological television series Time Team that the long building post-dated the preceptory, having timbers dated to c. 1620, but that the chapel, since demolished, and with only footings remaining, was authentically Templar. In the episode, broadcast in 1996, an old tithe map revealed the location of the Templar site late in the investigation. An old stone boundary wall was found to be still standing 7 ft (2.1 m) high.

In the late 20th and early 21st centuries, the house was owned by Geoff Wilson, a modern-day Templar. Wilson died in 2024, aged 78.

== Sources ==
- Historic England, "Manor House (1056356)", National Heritage List for England
