= Henstridge railway station =

Former railway station in England

Coordinates: 50.9798°N 2.3912°W

Henstridge
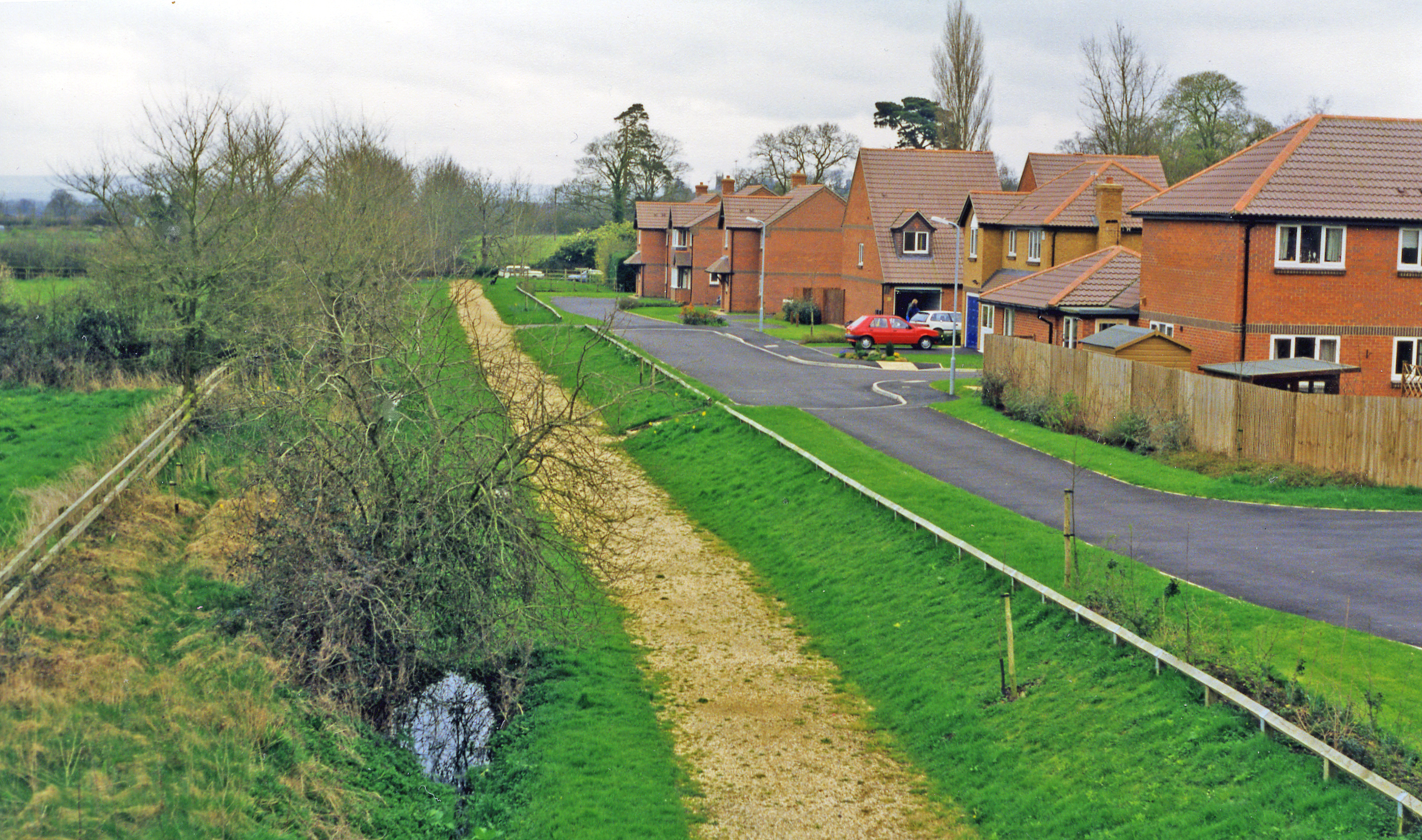
- The site of the station in 1998

General information
- Location: Henstridge, Somerset; England
- Grid reference: ST726201
- Platforms: 1

Other information
- Status: Disused

History
- Pre-grouping: Somerset and Dorset Joint Railway
- Post-grouping: SR and LMSR; Southern Region of British Railways

Key dates
- 31 August 1863: Opened
- 7 March 1966: Closed
Location

Henstridge railway station was a station at Henstridge in the county of Somerset, in England. It was located on the Somerset and Dorset Joint Railway. Sited on a single line stretch, the station had one short platform with a modest station building. A siding was controlled from a ground frame, and an adjacent level crossing operated by hand.

== History ==
The station was "formally" opened on 31 August 1863 on the completion of the Blandford Forum to Templecombe section of the Dorset Central Railway, which had merged with the Somerset Central Railway the previous year to form the Somerset and Dorset. However public traffic did not start until 10 September, after the Board of Trade's inspection. As part of the southern section of the line, it was under the administrative control of the London and South Western Railway after the Somerset and Dorset came under joint ownership of the LSWR and the Midland Railway in 1875. Becoming part of the Southern Region of British Railways when the railways were nationalised in 1948, the station was closed to passengers when the S&DJR main line closed on 7 March 1966. Goods traffic had ceased a year earlier.

== The site today ==
Today the site is a green area at the edge of a residential estate. A road overbridge to the north of the station site helps to mark the location.

Preceding station	Disused railways	Following station
Stalbridge; Line and station closed	Somerset & Dorset Joint Railway; LSWR and Midland Railways	Templecombe; Line closed station open
