= Stalbridge railway station =

Former railway station in England

Coordinates: 50.9617°N 2.3726°W

Stalbridge

General information
- Location: Stalbridge, Dorset; England
- Grid reference: ST738182
- Platforms: 2

Other information
- Status: Disused

History
- Pre-grouping: Somerset and Dorset Joint Railway
- Post-grouping: SR and LMSR; Southern Region of British Railways

Key dates
- 31 August 1863: Opened
- 7 March 1966: Closed
Location

Stalbridge railway station was a station in Stalbridge in the county of Dorset, England. It was located on the Somerset and Dorset Joint Railway. Sited on a single line stretch, the station had a passing loop with a station building on the up side and a waiting shelter on the down side. The goods yard and adjacent level crossing were controlled from a signal box.

== History ==
The station was opened on 31 August 1863 by the London and South Western Railway as part of the Dorset Central Railway. The station was part of the Southern Region of British Railways when the railways were nationalised in 1948. The station was closed when the S&DJR closed on 7 March 1966.

== The site today ==
Today the site is a trading estate and only some rails embedded in the road show the station was there.

Preceding station	Disused railways	Following station
Sturminster Newton; Line and station closed	Somerset & Dorset Joint Railway; LSWR and Midland Railways	Henstridge; Line and station closed
