= A357 road =

Main road in Great Britain

A357

Major junctions
- South end: Blandford (50.877°N 2.195°W)
- A350 A30 A371
- North end: Wincanton (51.047°N 2.434°W)

Location
- Country: United Kingdom
- Primary destinations: Blandford; Sturminster Newton; Stalbridge; Henstridge; Templecombe; Wincanton

Road network
- Roads in the United Kingdom; Motorways; A and B road zones

The A357 is a road that leads from Blandford to Wincanton. In combination with the A350 and A371, it forms the main route between Blandford and Poole and Weston-super-Mare, of which it is the intermediate segment.

There have been calls for traffic calming measures at Sturminster Newton, regarding a perception of many vehicles exceeding the speed limit. Between August 2011 and August 2016, there were 2 slight injuries due to road traffic accidents on the stretch. There have been fatal accidents on the stretch of road near Blandford.
