= Horsington, Somerset =

Village and civil parish in Somerset, England

Coordinates: 51.013°N 2.426°W

Horsington
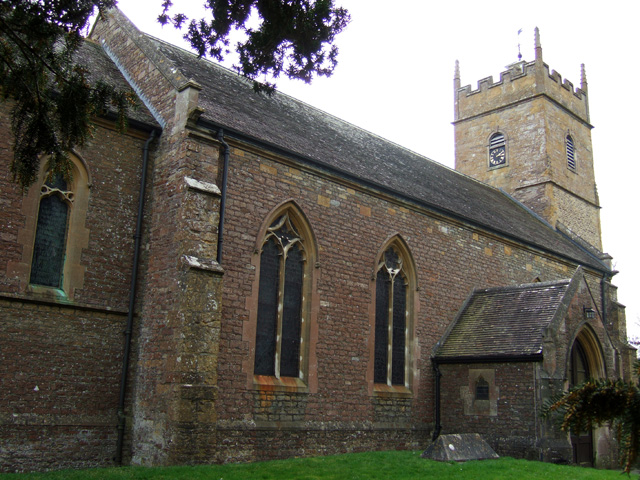
- Church of St John the Baptist, Horsington

- Location within Somerset
- Population: 579 (2021)
- OS grid reference: ST702238
- Civil parish: Horsington
- Unitary authority: Somerset Council
- Ceremonial county: Somerset
- Region: South West
- Country: England
- Sovereign state: United Kingdom
- Post town: Templecombe
- Postcode district: BA8
- Dialling code: 01963
- Police: Avon and Somerset
- Fire: Devon and Somerset
- Ambulance: South Western
- UK Parliament: Glastonbury and Somerton
- Website: Parish Council

Horsington is a village and civil parish in Somerset, England, about 4 miles (6.4 km) south of Wincanton and 1 mile (1.6 km) north of Templecombe. The village lies on the edge of Horsington Marsh, within the Blackmore Vale. The parish includes the adjoining hamlets of Peckholdsash and Wilkin Throop (or Wilkinthroop) and the village of South Cheriton. The parish population at the 2021 census was 579.

== History ==
The name of the village means "the settlement of the horse keepers".

The cross on the village green was erected in 1284 to mark the site of the market. It is built of hamstone with an octagonal shaft on a stepped circular base.

The parish was part of the hundred of Horethorne.

Horsington Manor was owned by the Gowens family from the 16th century until 1653, and from 1748 by Matthew Spencer who built the manor house. Spencer's son sold it to the Bailward family. Large quantities of documents relating to Horsington Manor have been donated to the Somerset Record Office for safekeeping.

In 1990s, Ardon Lyon, a philosophy lecturer from London, purchased Horsington House, in a state of substantial neglect, disrepair and deferred maintenance. Prior to Lyon's purchase, the owners had used Horsington House as a hotel. Lyon spent the better part of a decade repairing and restoring Horsington House and its out-buildings (such as the carriage house) to their original state. He subdivided Horsington House, and the carriage house, into several flats and sold them to individual purchasers.

Horsington Village Hall, also known as St Margaret's Hall, was built in 1907, on land donated to the Community by Thomas Bailward. It lies midway between Horsington and South Cheriton villages, isolated from other buildings but adjacent to playing fields leased to South Cheriton Football Club and Horsington Cricket Club. There is a car-park for about 25 vehicles alongside

== Governance ==
The parish council has responsibility for local issues, including setting an annual precept (local rate) to cover the council's operating costs and producing annual accounts for public scrutiny. The parish council evaluates local planning applications and works with the local police, district council officers, and neighbourhood watch groups on matters of crime, security, and traffic. The parish council's role also includes initiating projects for the maintenance and repair of parish facilities, as well as consulting with the district council on the maintenance, repair, and improvement of highways, drainage, footpaths, public transport, and street cleaning. Conservation matters (including trees and listed buildings) and environmental issues are also the responsibility of the council.

For local government purposes, since 1 April 2023, the parish comes under the unitary authority of Somerset Council. Prior to this, it was part of the non-metropolitan district of South Somerset (established under the Local Government Act 1972). It was part of Wincanton Rural District before 1974.

It is also part of the Glastonbury and Somerton county constituency represented in the House of Commons of the Parliament of the United Kingdom. It elects one Member of Parliament (MP) by the first past the post system of election.

== Religious sites ==
The parish Church of St John the Baptist was originally a 15th-century building, on the site of an earlier church, but was largely rebuilt in 1885–1887 by Willcox of Bath. The first recorded Rector was in 1305. It has been designated as a Grade II* listed building.
