= Dorset and Somerset Air Ambulance =

English charity air ambulance

- Founded: December 1999
- Type: Registered charity No. 10786857
- Purpose: Air ambulance
- Locations: HQ: Wellington, Somerset; Aircraft: Henstridge Airfield, Somerset
- Coordinates: 50.9876°N 2.3547°W
- Region served: Dorset; Somerset
- Revenue: £11 million (2025)
- Employees: 25 (2025)
- Volunteers: 104 (2025)
- Website: www.dsairambulance.org.uk

The Dorset and Somerset Air Ambulance is a registered charity, which uses a helicopter to provide an air ambulance service to the English counties of Dorset and Somerset. The air ambulance came into service in March 2000, following the success of similar schemes, such as Devon Air Ambulance and Cornwall Air Ambulance. The air ambulance headquarters are at Wellington in Somerset, but the helicopter is based at Henstridge Airfield in Somerset.

== Aircraft ==
The service operates two AgustaWestland AW169 helicopters, callsign Helimed 10, which have been in service since June 2017 and May 2026. Travelling at speeds of up to 165 knots (190 mph; 306 km/h), it can land in an area half the size of a tennis court and can reach anywhere in the two counties within twenty minutes of an emergency call. It is crewed by two pilots, a paramedic and a critical care doctor and can carry two patients on stretchers. The pilots and maintenance staff are employed by Gama Aviation, the company which leases the helicopter to the air ambulance service. The paramedics are employed by South Western Ambulance Service (SWASFT), although a number of these are paid for by the charity, while critical care doctors are seconded from local NHS hospital trusts.

On 8 September 2025, the charity launched a fundraising campaign called 2ndHeli Appeal with the aim of raising £1 million to purchase and commission a second helicopter. The helicopter was delivered in May 2026.

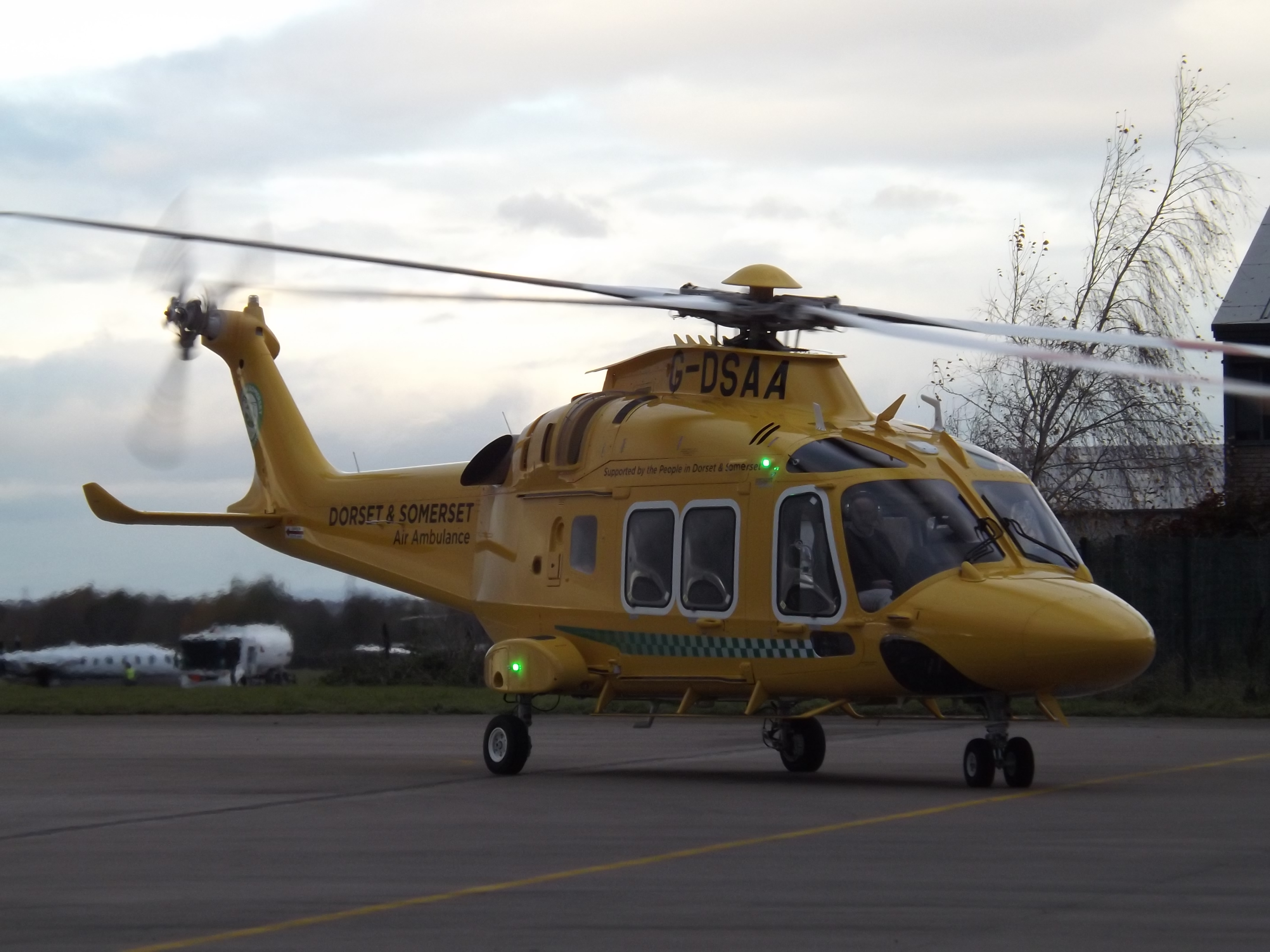
The charity's current helicopter – G-DSAA AW169

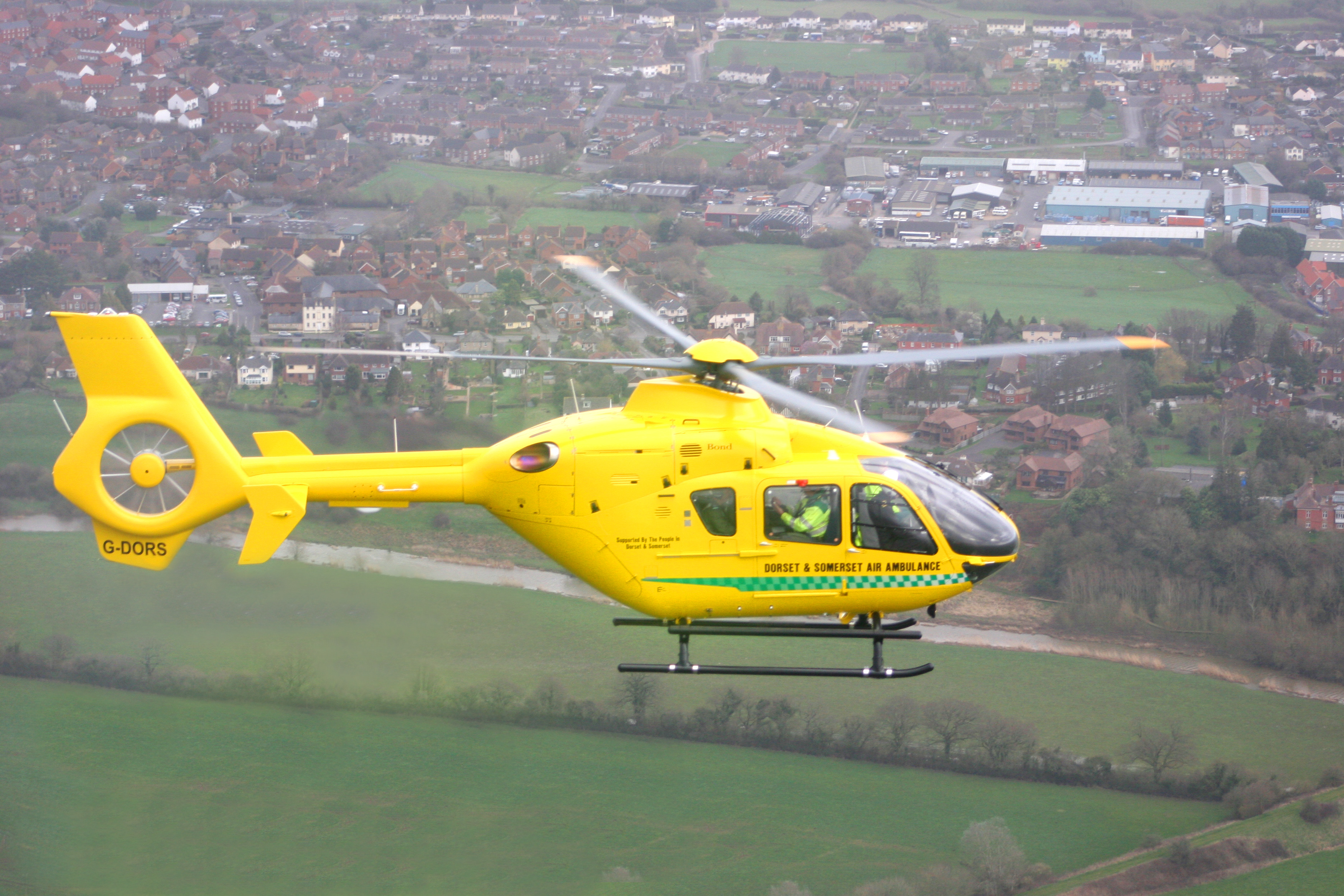
The charity's previous helicopter – EC135 over Sturminster Newton. It was in service from 2007 to 2017.

== Operations ==
Dorset and Somerset Air Ambulance provides life-saving, pre-hospital critical care, to patients in need. They operate 19 hours a day (7.00 am – 2.00 am) providing a critical care service, using their helicopter and critical care car.

=== Statistics ===
In the year ending March 2025, the charity were called to 2,954 missions; 1,387 of these were using the helicopter and critical care car with outreach cars attending 1,567 incidents to provide enhanced care.

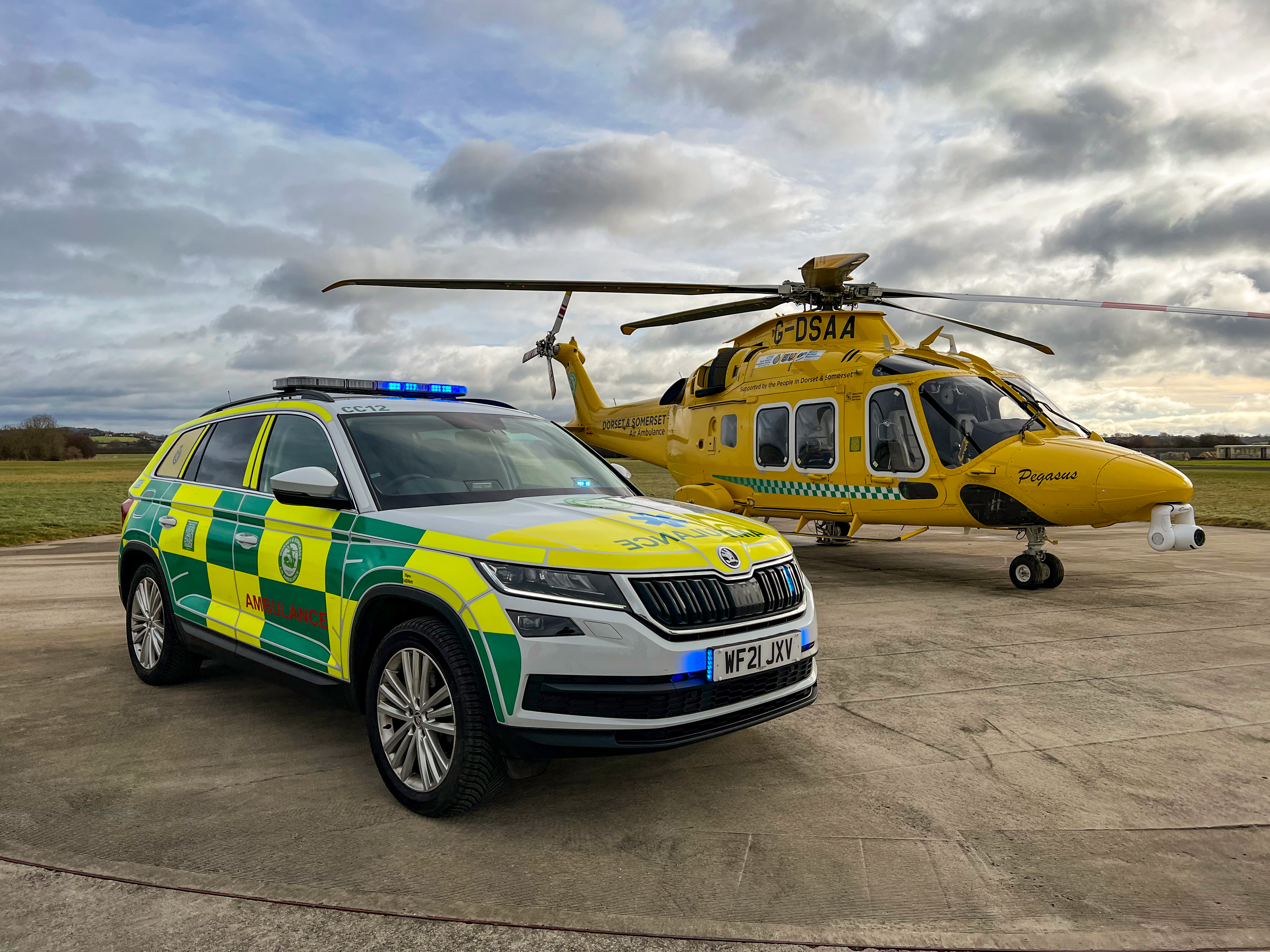
Dorset and Somerset Air Ambulance AW169 Helicopter and Critical Care Car.

In May 2011, the charity flew its 8,000th mission, and by 2015 had flown a total of 10,700. Typical incidents for which the assistance of the air ambulance is requested by SWASFT, include road traffic collisions, medical emergencies such as cardiac arrest, agricultural and horse riding accidents, due to the remote locations and the severity of injuries involved in such incidents.

=== Deployment and delivery ===
Dorset and Somerset Air Ambulance is tasked by a dedicated Helicopter Emergency Medical Service (HEMS) desk, located at the South Western Ambulance Service NHS Foundation Trust clinical hub in Exeter.

Paid for by the five air ambulance charities it serves; Dorset and Somerset Air Ambulance, Devon Air Ambulance, Cornwall Air Ambulance, Great Western Air Ambulance Charity and Wiltshire Air Ambulance. The HEMS desk is staffed by specific dispatchers who understand the capabilities of air ambulances and the regulations that govern the deployment. These individuals play a crucial role in deciding where and when the helicopter is deployed. They can also call on support from HM Coastguard, Police and Search and Rescue should the need arise.

=== Critical care and outreach cars ===
Dorset and Somerset Air Ambulance also provide an enhanced care service across Dorset and Somerset using outreach cars. The Škoda Kodiaq critical care and outreach car has been converted by the South Western Ambulance Service NHS Foundation Trust (SWASfT) to ensure it meets all the standards and regulations of their existing fleet of rapid response vehicles.

The car is equipped to the same high standards, with the same base level of equipment that would be found on a land ambulance, including oxygen, response bags, paediatric, burns, and asthma kits, a defibrillator, major incident triage packs and traction splints.

The vehicles enhance their service by enabling them to respond to incidents when elements restrict the helicopter flying and to provide an additional enhanced care service in Dorset and Somerset. They also give the charity additional resources to despatch, in the need of a medical emergency which requires both the helicopter and a land vehicle.

== Finances ==
Dorset and Somerset Air Ambulance's operations are 95% funded by charitable giving. In 2023, the air ambulance service was tasked to 2,424 incidents, with each mission costing approximately £3,500.

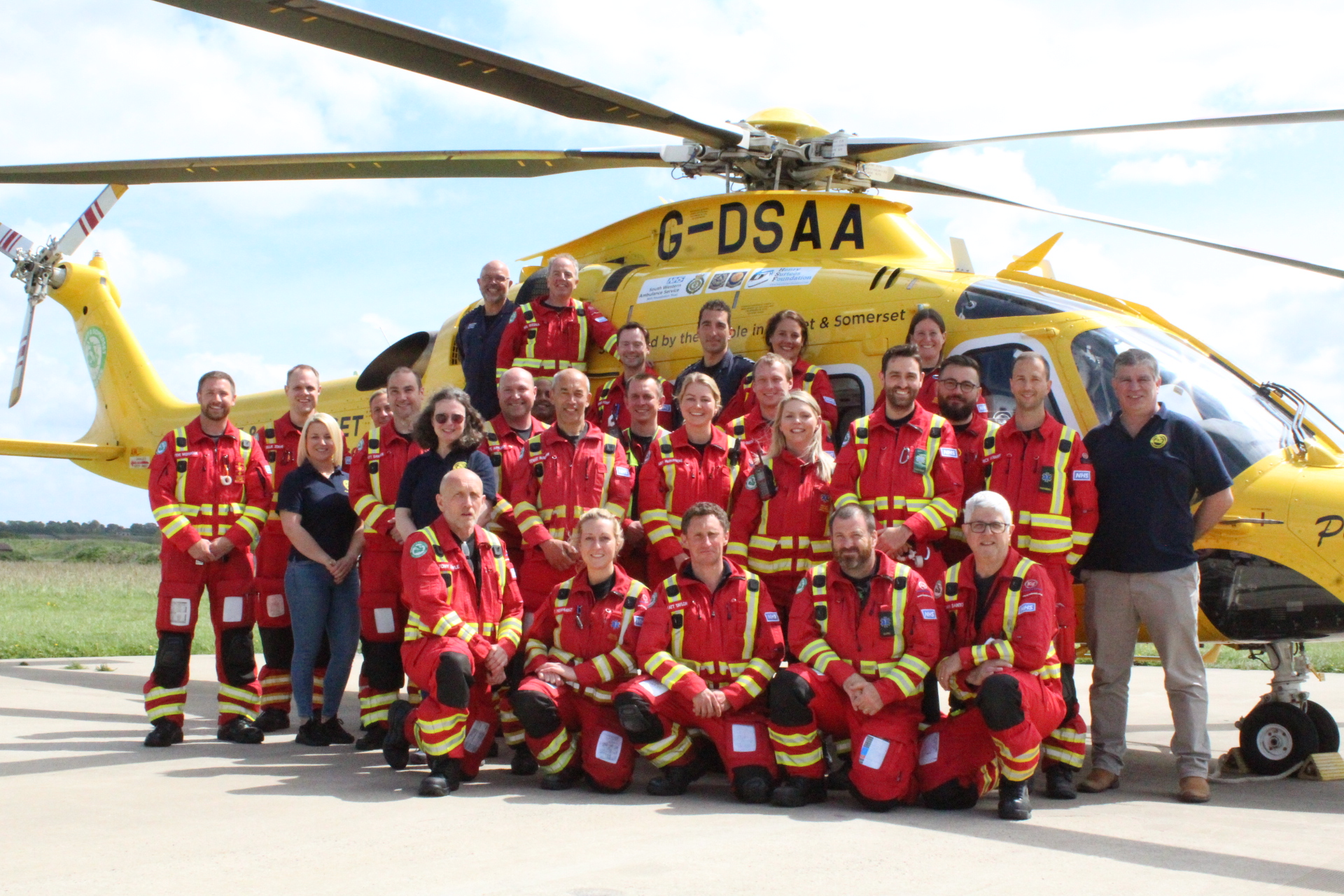
Members of the Dorset and Somerset Air Ambulance Team.

In the year ending March 2025, the charity's income was £11.0 million and expenditure was £10.1M, of which it spent £8.5M (84%) operating its helicopter and rapid response vehicle. This money has to be raised largely from charitable donations. The charity is supported by volunteers spread across the two counties who work to raise funds to ensure that this service continues. It also runs a weekly lottery, which in 2019 accounted for 48% of the charity's income. In 2025, the charity had 25 employees, of which three were paid between £60,000 and £110,000 a year.

In 2019, the charity's patron, Somerset racing driver Jenson Button, wrote the foreword to Haynes Publishing Group's new publication Air Ambulance Operations Manual. The book, written in the style of traditional Haynes Manuals, features cutaway diagrams of the charity's AW169 helicopter. The publisher is making a donation of £0.75 from the sale of every copy to benefit air ambulance charities across the United Kingdom.

== See also ==
- Air ambulances in the United Kingdom
- Healthcare in Dorset
- Healthcare in Somerset
