= Templecombe Preceptory =

Coordinates: 51.0012°N 2.4181°W

- Interactive map of Templecombe Preceptory

Monastery information
- Order: Knights Templar then Knights Hospitaller
- Established: 1185
- Disestablished: 1539

People
- Founder: Leofwine
- Important associated figures: Odo of Bayeux

Site
- Location: Templecombe, Somerset, England
- Grid reference: ST708224

Templecombe Preceptory shown within Somerset
(grid reference ST708224)

Templecombe Preceptory (or Combe Templariorum) was established in 1185 in Templecombe, Somerset, England.

One of the manors within the parish was held by Earl Leofwine. It was awarded to Bishop Odo of Bayeux after the Norman Conquest. It was his descendant Serlo FitzOdo who granted it to the Knights Templar who established a preceptory in the village in 1185.

The preceptory served as an administrative centre for the lands held by the Templars in the south west of England and Cornwall. It may also have been used to train men and horses for the Crusades.

After the Knights Templar were suppressed following the 1307 order by Pope Clement IV, it was granted to the Knights of St John who held it until the dissolution of the monasteries in 1540. It was then granted to Richard Duke, with the thirteenth century chapel surviving in private use. This chapel was almost entirely demolished in 1980 to make way for a house.

The so-called 'Templecombe Head', a face painted on oak panels c.1280 and discovered in an outhouse in the village, may have been linked to the preceptory. It is thought to depict either Christ or John the Baptist.

An attempt to discover 'the village of the Templars' was made by archaeological television programme Time Team.

== See also ==
- Manor House, Templecombe
