= 760 Naval Air Squadron =

Inactive flying squadron of the Royal Navy's Fleet Air Arm

- Squadron badge
- Active: 1940–1942; 1944; 1945–1946; 1989–present
- Country: United Kingdom
- Branch: Royal Navy
- Type: Fleet Air Arm Second Line Squadron
- Role: No.1 Fleet Fighter Pool; Anti-Submarine Operational Training Squadron; Naval Air Fighter School; Engineering Training Squadron
- Size: Squadron
- Part of: Fleet Air Arm
- Aircraft: See Aircraft operated section for full list.

Insignia
- Squadron Badge Description: Blue, upon a bar wavy white in base a griffin rampant gold armed and langued red (2006)
- Identification Markings: W7A+ to W9A+ Sea Hurricanes; Y1A+ to Y7A+ Corsairs

760 Naval Air Squadron (760 NAS), sometimes referred to as 760 Squadron, is a non-flying Fleet Air Arm (FAA) naval air squadron of the United Kingdom's Royal Navy (RN). It reformed in 1989 at the Air Engineering School at RNAS Lee-on-Solent (HMS Daedalus), providing air engineering training for officers and ratings using old airframes. The school moved to HMS Sultan at Gosport in 1995. It continues as the Engineering Training Squadron of the Royal Navy Air Engineering and Survival School, now equipped with retired Westland Sea King airframes.

The squadron first formed in April 1940 as No.1 Fleet Fighter Pool with a variety of aircraft types before standardising in 1941 on the Hawker Sea Hurricane. In this role it disbanded in December 1942. In May 1944 760 Squadron briefly reformed as an Anti-Submarine Operational Training Squadron before disbanding into 766 Naval Air Squadron in November.

Reformed again as part of No.1 Naval Air Fighter School in April 1945 it converted fighter pilots to the Vought Corsair and then the Supermarine Seafire until 23 January 1946 when it disbanded.

== History ==
=== Fighter Pool Squadron (1940-1942) ===
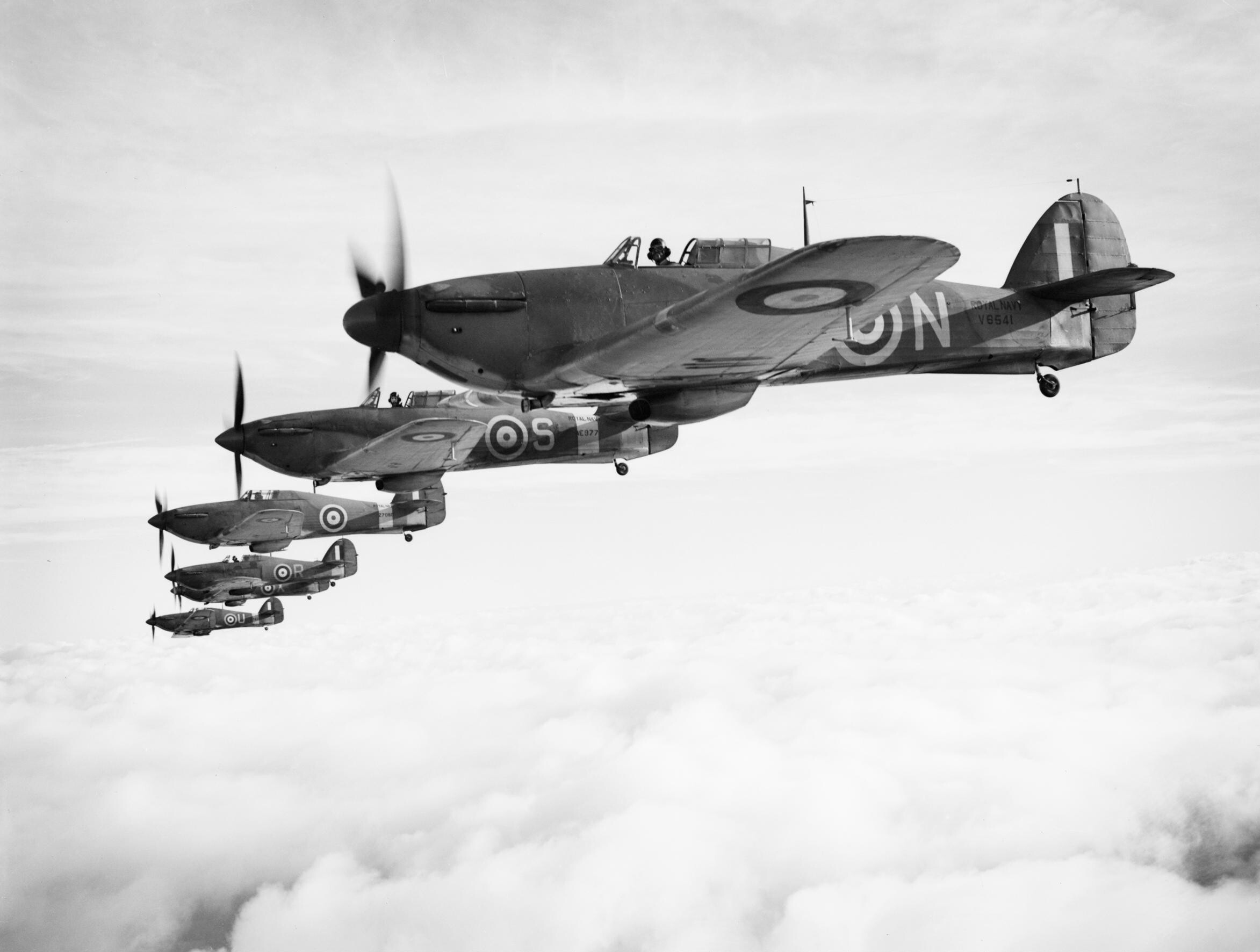
Hawker Sea Hurricanes

760 Naval Air Squadron was formed at RNAS Eastleigh (HMS Raven), in Hampshire, on 1 April 1940, as Fighter Pool No. 1. It was initially equipped with four Blackburn Skua, a carrier-based dive bomber and fighter aircraft, two Blackburn Roc, a naval turret fighter aircraft and one Gloster Sea Gladiator biplane fighter aircraft. Five months later, on 16 September 1940, the squadron relocated to RNAS Yeovilton (HMS Heron) near Yeovil, Somerset. The squadron later acquired Miles Master, an advanced trainer aircraft, Fairey Fulmar, a carrier-based reconnaissance/fighter aircraft, Grumman Martlet, an American carrier based fighter aircraft, Brewster Buffalo, an American fighter aircraft, the British Hawker Hurricane fighter aircraft and Hawker Sea Hurricane fighter aircraft, a navalised Hawker Hurricane, from 1940 to 1941. 760 Naval Air Squadron disbanded at RNAS Yeovilton (HMS Heron) on 31 December 1942.

=== Anti-Submarine Operational Training Squadron (1944) ===
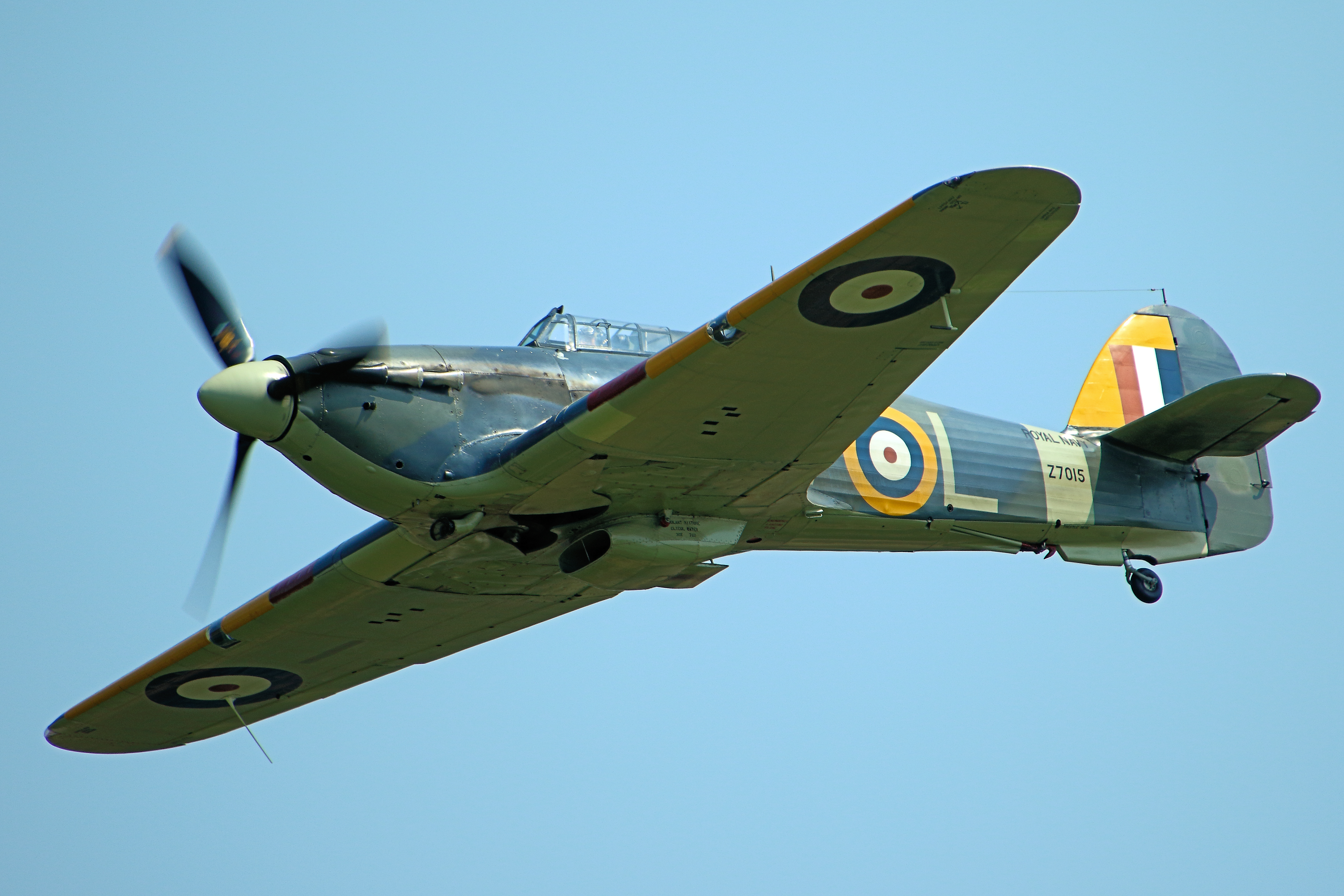
Hawker Sea Hurricane of the type used by 760 NAS

760 Naval Air Squadron reformed at RNAS Inskip (HMS Nightjar), near the village of Inskip, Lancashire, on 1 May 1944, as an Anti-Submarine Operational Training Squadron. The squadron was equipped solely with Hawker Sea Hurricane fighter aircraft. However, this role only lasted for six months and 760 NAS disbanded at RNAS Inskip on 1 November 1944.

=== Naval Air Fighter School (1945-1946) ===
760 Naval Air Squadron reformed on 10 April 1945 at RNAS Zeals (HMS Hummingbird), located north of the village of Zeals, in Wiltshire, as part of the Naval Air Fighter School. The squadron was initially equipped with North American Harvard, an American advanced trainer aircraft and Vought Corsair, an American fighter aircraft, and in August 1945, also operated the Grumman Hellcat, an American carrier-based fighter aircraft. On 12 September 1945, 760 NAS moved to RNAS Lee-on-Solent (HMS Daedalus), situated in Hampshire. Retaining only the North American Harvard, the squadron was then also equipped with Supermarine Seafire fighter aircraft, from October 1945. The squadron moved again on 27 December 1945, it relocated to RNAS Henstridge (HMS Dipper), in Somerset and continued operating with Supermarine Seafire aircraft. However, the move to RNAS Henstridge only lasted one month, with 760 Naval Air Squadron disbanding there on 23 January 1946.

=== Engineering Training Squadron (1989-present) ===
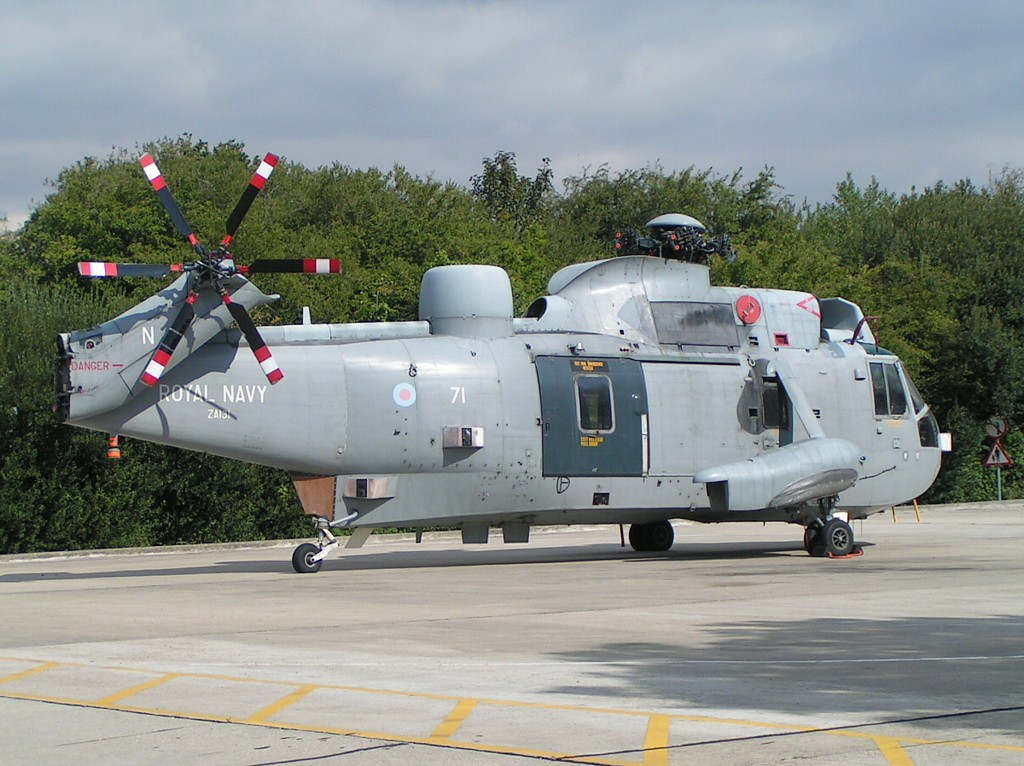
Westland Sea King ZA131 at HMS Sultan

760 Naval Air Squadron reformed at RNAS Lee-on-Solent (HMS Daedalus) in 1989, within the Air Engineering School and utilised Westland Wessex helicopter airframes for training. Prior to RNAS Lee-on Solent closing, the squadron moved to HMS Sultan in Gosport, Hampshire, in December 1995. It is currently the Engineering Training Squadron within the Royal Naval Air Engineering & Survival School (RNAESS), based at HMS Sultan.

The RNAESS forms part of the Defence School of Aeronautical Engineering, which provides training for aircraft engineering officers and tradesmen across the three British armed forces. The squadron is housed in Stephenson Hangar at HMS Sultan. This comprehensive mock-up squadron includes a dedicated hangar, aircraft, tool issue center, and maintenance control offices. These facilities are designed to fully engage students in the field of air engineering, simulating a squadron environment with an ongoing scenario that persists throughout the entire experience.

To develop the skills and knowledge of junior Air Engineer Officers, 760 Engineering Training Squadron offers a four-week program as part of Phase 3 - Squadron Management within the System Engineering & Management Course. This program concludes with the Air Engineering Qualifying Board (AEQB). In Phase 4 - Certificate of Competency (C of C) Training, the squadron conducts practical evaluations, which encompass CHAOS and a PCM Exercise.

== Aircraft operated ==
The squadron has operated a number of different aircraft types, including:

- Blackburn Skua Mk.II dive bomber and fighter aircraft (April 1940 - April 1941)
- Blackburn Roc I fighter aircraft (April 1940 - March 1941)
- Gloster Sea Gladiator biplane fighter aircraft (April 1940 - September 1940)
- Miles Master I advanced trainer (June 1940 - December 1942)
- Fairey Fulmar Mk.I reconnaissance/fighter aircraft (March 1941 - June 1941)
- Fairey Fulmar Mk.II reconnaissance/fighter aircraft (March 1941 - June 1941)
- Grumman Martlet Mk I fighter aircraft (October 1941)
- Brewster Buffalo Mk I fighter aircraft (December 1941 - April 1942)
- Hawker Hurricane Mk I fighter aircraft (October 1941 - December 1942)
- Hawker Sea Hurricane Mk IB fighter aircraft (October 1941 - December 1942)
- Hawker Sea Hurricane Mk IIC fighter aircraft (May 1944 - October 1944)
- North American Harvard IIA advanced trainer aircraft (April 1945 - January 1946)
- Vought Corsair Mk III fighter bomber aircraft (April 1945 - October 1945)
- Grumman Hellcat F. Mk I fighter aircraft (August 1945)
- Supermarine Seafire F Mk III fighter aircraft (October 1945 - January 1946)
- Westland Sea King Mk V/ VI ASaC (1989 - August 2024)
- Westland Lynx Mk VIII HMA (August 2024 - present)

== Naval air stations and Royal Navy shore establishment ==
764 Naval Air Squadron operated from a number of naval air stations of the Royal Navy and a Royal Navy shore establishment:

1940 - 1942

- Royal Naval Air Station Eastleigh (HMS Raven) (1 April 1940 - 16 September 1940)
- Royal Naval Air Station Yeovilton (HMS Heron) (16 September 1940 - 13 August 1941)
- disbanded - (31 December 1942)

1944

- Royal Naval Air Station Inskip (HMS Nightjar) (1 May 1944 - 1 November 1944)
- disbanded - (1 November 1944)

1945 - 1946

- Royal Naval Air Station Zeals (HMS Hummingbird) (10 April 1945 - 12 September 1945)
- Royal Naval Air Station Lee-on-Solent (HMS Daedalus) (12 September 1945 - 27 December 1945)
- Royal Naval Air Station Henstridge (HMS Dipper) (27 December 1945 - 23 January 1946)
- disbanded - (23 January 1946)

1989 - present

- Royal Naval Air Station Lee-on-Solent (HMS Daedalus) (1989 - 1995)
- HMS Sultan (1995–present)

== Commanding officers ==
List of commanding officers of 760 Naval Air Squadron with date of appointment:

1940 - 1942

- Lieutenant J. Casson, RN, from 1 April 1940
- Lieutenant Commander P.H. Havers, RN, from 23 May 1940
- Lieutenant Commander G.N. Torry, RN, from 18 January 1941
- Lieutenant K.V.V. Spurway, RN, from 1 August 1941
- Lieutenant E.W.T. Taylour, RN, from 13 November 1941
- Lieutenant O.J.R. Nicolls, RN, from 8 December 1941
- Lieutenant(A) H.M. Cox, RNVR, from 3 April 1942
- Lieutenant H.P. Allingham, RN, from 10 September 1942
- disbanded - 31 December 1942

1944

- Lieutenant Commander(A) J.D. Kellsal, RNVR, from 1 May 1944
- disbanded - 1 November 1944

1945 - 1946

- Lieutenant Commander(A) P.G. Burke, RNZVNR, from 21 April 1945
- Lieutenant Commander(A) R. Tebble, RNVR, from 15September 1945
- disbanded - 23 January 1946

Note: Abbreviation (A) signifies Air Branch of the RN or RNVR.
