= Outdoor playset =

Structure used by children on a playground

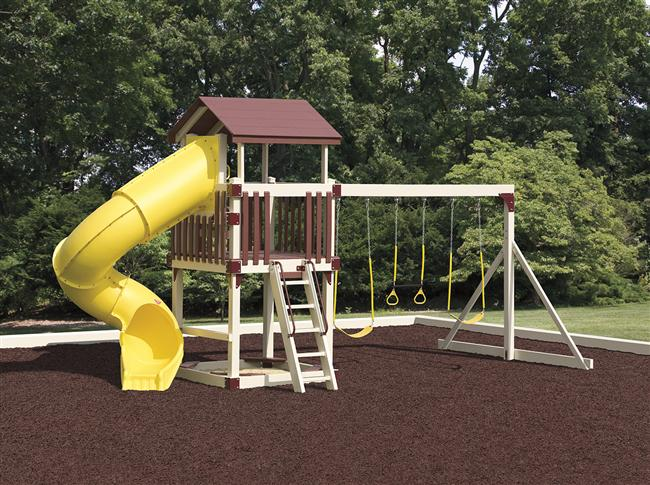
A playset on a playground, featuring a tube slide, a ladder, and swings

An outdoor playset is a structure erected outside for children to play on and around.

== Components ==
Typical components of an outdoor playset include:

- Towers. In a playset, a tower is a vertical structure with one or more decks placed at various levels. A deck is essentially a horizontal play surface contained within or attached to a tower.
- Bridges. Towers may be connected to one another via fixed bridges or chain bridges for children to walk across.
- Ladders. Rope ladders and fixed ladders are common accessories for playsets.
- Sandboxes. A sandbox often accompanies an outdoor playset.
- Seesaws. Seesaws are a long, narrow board supported by a single pivot point.
- Slides. Playground slides may be covered or uncovered.
- Swings. Swings are usually mounted on a free-standing swing set.
- Monkey bars. Towers may be connected by monkey bars as well as bridges.

== Safety ==
In July 2001, the U.S. Consumer Product Safety Commission (CPSC) reported that each year, more than 200,000 children are taken to hospital emergency rooms due to playground-related injuries. Most injuries occur when a child falls onto the playground surface.

=== Play surface ===
Options for surfacing the ground around a playset include sand, pea gravel, wood chips, shredded rubber, and asphalt. The perimeter of the play yard is often made from concrete or wood. The depth of the surfacing on the play area should be based on a CPSC recommendations for the type of surface materials and maximum possible fall height, for example:

Fall Height In Feet From Which A Life Threatening Head Injury Would Not Be Expected
Type of Material	6'' Depth	9'' Depth	12'' Depth
Double Shredded Bark Mulch	6	10	11
Wood Chips	6	7	12
Fine Sand	5	5	9
Fine Gravel	6	7	10

== Playhouses ==
Another type of outdoor playground equipment is the playhouse. These are scaled-down replicas of full sized homes—much like a tree house but on the ground. They can promote a child's imagination and creativity. A playhouse may be as simple as a cutout in a cardboard box, or as complex as a permanent outdoor structure wired with electricity and running water. There are a number of companies that specialize in creating elaborate and distinctive playhouses which can be used for both commercial and private purposes.

== See also ==
- Jungle gym
- Playground
- Playground slide
- Swing (seat)
