= Templecombe =

Village in Somerset, England

Coordinates: 50.999982°N 2.415075°W

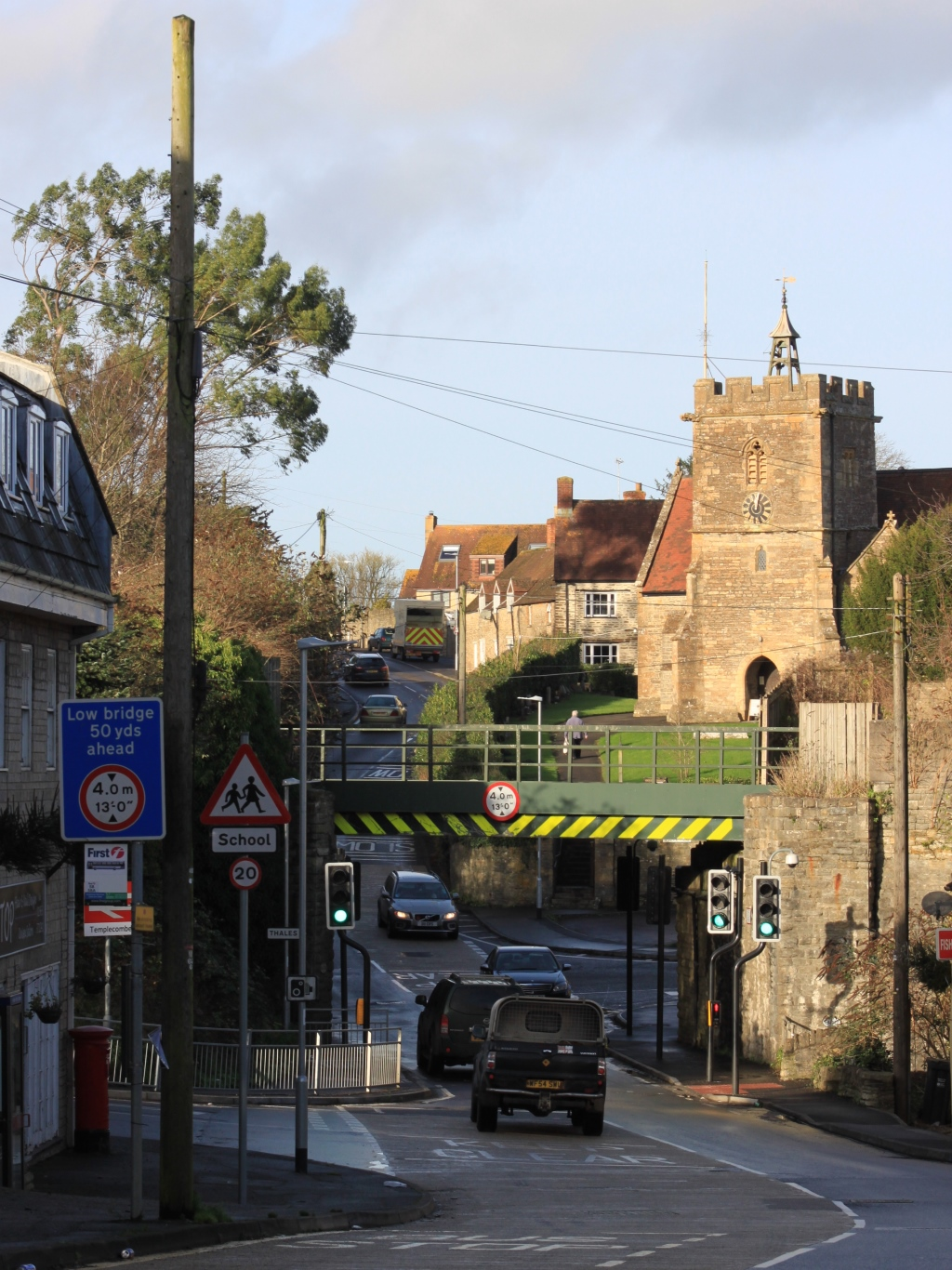

- Location within Somerset
- Population: 1,657 (2021)
- OS grid reference: ST709223
- Civil parish: Abbas and Templecombe
- Unitary authority: Somerset Council
- Ceremonial county: Somerset
- Region: South West
- Country: England
- Sovereign state: United Kingdom
- Post town: Templecombe
- Postcode district: BA8
- Dialling code: 01963
- Police: Avon and Somerset
- Fire: Devon and Somerset
- Ambulance: South Western
- UK Parliament: Glastonbury and Somerton

Templecombe is a village in Somerset, England, situated on the A357 road five miles south of Wincanton, 12 miles (19 km) east of Yeovil, and 30 miles (48 km) west of Salisbury. It is in the Blackmore Vale.

Templecombe is the main settlement in the civil parish of Abbas and Templecombe, along with the hamlet of Combe Throop. Historically, Temple Combe was the southern part of the village and Abbas Combe the northern part, but in modern usage Templecombe is the common name for the whole settlement.

The parish had a population of 1,657 at the 2021 census, up from 1,560 in 2011.

== History ==
Before the Norman Conquest Combe was held by Leofwine Godwinson.

Abbas Combe was recorded in the Domesday Book of 1086–87 as Cumbe, when it was held by the church of St Edward, Shaftesbury.

The other manor within the parish was held by Godwinson, but after the Norman Conquest, was given to Bishop Odo of Bayeux. It was his descendant Serlo FitzOdo who granted it to the Knights Templar.

The parish was part of the Hundred of Horethorne.

Templecombe derives its name from Combe Templariorum, after the Knights Templar who established Templecombe Preceptory in the village in 1185. After they were suppressed in 1312 it was granted to the Knights Hospitaller who held it until the dissolution of the monasteries, after which it was acquired by Richard Duke (d. 1572) of Otterton, Devon. An attempt to discover 'the village of the templars' was made by the Time Team television series, in a programme first shown in 1996. Late in the investigation, an old tithe map revealed the location of the Templar site, and an old stone boundary wall was found to be still standing 7 ft (2.1 m) high.

Manor House in the high street was built in the 17th century on the site of a medieval building. Richard Boyle, 1st Earl of Cork, bought Temple Coombe Manor in 1637 for £20,000. The Earl already owned Stalbridge Manor in Dorset, close by. Boyle also purchased Annery House near Bideford in 1640 for £5000.

Somerset by G.W. Wade and J.H. Wade (c. 1904) states, "Templecombe (or Abbas Combe), an inconsiderable village at the S.E. extremity of the county, with an important station on the S. & D. and L. & S.W. lines. The church is ancient but uninteresting, and seems to have been considerably altered. It contains a curious E.E. font. The tower is somewhat peculiar, and forms the S. porch. On the rising ground at the S. of the village are the remains of a preceptory of the Knights Templars, founded in the 12th century by Serlo Fitz-Odo. From this foundation the place takes its name. A long building, which was perhaps once the refectory, but which is now used as a barn, will be noticed abutting on a farm-house along the road to Milborne Port. In an orchard at the back of the farm are the ruins of a small chapel."

It was found by Time Team that the long building post-dated the preceptory, having timbers dated to c. 1620; but that the chapel, since demolished, and with only footings remaining, was authentically Templar.

Lady Theodora Guest funded the building of Templecombe's "Merthyr Guest Cottage hospital" which opened in 1906. It had over 100 in-patients in 1947, when it became an NHS maternity hospital, and operated until 1974.

== Governance ==
The Abbas and Templecombe parish council has responsibility for local issues.

The village is in Somerset unitary district, administered by Somerset Council. The village is part of 'Blackmoor Vale' electoral division for council elections. Historically it was in Wincanton Rural District from 1894 until local government reorganisation in 1974. It was then in South Somerset district until the creation of Somerset unitary district in 2023.

It is part of the Glastonbury and Somerton constituency in the House of Commons.

== Transport ==
Templecombe railway station is served by trains on the London Waterloo to Exeter St Davids West of England Main Line, originally built by the London and South Western Railway. When the village was served by the Somerset and Dorset Joint Railway, trains had to reverse into Templecombe station. This unusual characteristic was shared with Limerick Junction in County Tipperary in Ireland, and also previously with Dorchester South. The station closed in 1966 due to the Beeching Axe, but re-opened due to local pressure in 1983.

== Economy ==
Templecombe's largest employer is Thales Underwater Systems, formerly Marconi Underwater Systems and Plessey Naval Systems.

The water treatment centre off Temple Lane, east of the village, is operated by Wessex Water. The original pumping station was built by the Temple Combe and Henstridge joint water committee in the 1940s.

== Education ==
Abbas and Templecombe CofE Primary School is on School Lane, close to the parish church. The current building dates back to 1899, with modern extensions to the rear. The original church school was founded in 1606 and expanded over the centuries. In 1835, it was funded by the National Society and then became a voluntary controlled school from 1948.

== Religious sites ==
The parish Church of St. Mary dates from the 12th century, but was largely rebuilt in the 19th century. It has been designated as a Grade II* listed building. The church contains a panel painting known as The Templecombe Head, discovered in a local cottage which has been carbon dated to around 1280 which is believed to be linked to the period when the Knights Templar held the village. Until the dissolution of the monasteries in the 1540s, the church was under the patronage of Shaftesbury Abbey, entitling them to appoint the vicar and collect income from the parish. The church patronage or advowson was then held by the lord of the manor of Abbas Combe until it reverted to the diocese of Bath and Wells in 1931.

In Templecombe stands the United Reformed Church (next door to the former The Royal Wessex, Public House). This building has been on the site for over 150 years: the current building dates from 1834 and was originally a congregational church.

== Notable residents ==
General Sir Richard McCreery (1898–1967), Chief of Staff to Field Marshal Harold Alexander, 1st Earl Alexander of Tunis, at the time of the Second Battle of El Alamein and later commanded the British Eighth Army in Northern Italy during 1944–45, died in Templecombe.

Valerie Singleton, TV presenter, lives in Templecombe.
