= Henstridge =

Village in Somerset, England

Coordinates: 50.9742°N 2.3930°W

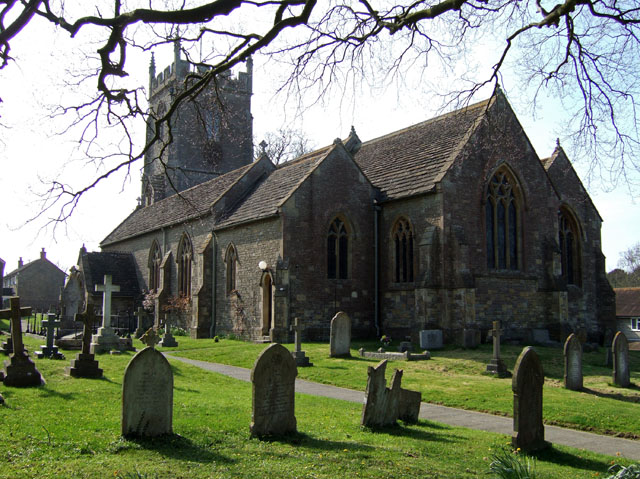
- Church of St Nicholas

- Location within Somerset
- Population: 1,814 (2011)
- OS grid reference: ST725195
- Unitary authority: Somerset
- Ceremonial county: Somerset
- Region: South West
- Country: England
- Sovereign state: United Kingdom
- Post town: Templecombe
- Postcode district: BA8
- Police: Avon and Somerset
- Fire: Devon and Somerset
- Ambulance: South Western
- UK Parliament: Glastonbury and Somerton

Henstridge is a village and civil parish in Somerset, England, situated 5 miles (8.0 km) east of Sherborne in the South Somerset district, near the border with Dorset. The parish includes the hamlet of Yenston. In 2011, the village had a population of 1,814.

== History ==
The village name means "the ridge where stallions are kept".

The parish was part of the hundred of Horethorne.

Yenston Priory was a 16th-century house of Benedictine monks.

== Governance ==
The parish council has responsibility for local issues, including setting an annual precept (local rate) to cover the council's operating costs and producing annual accounts for public scrutiny. The parish council evaluates local planning applications and works with the local police, district council officers, and neighbourhood watch groups on matters of crime, security, and traffic. The parish council's role also includes initiating projects for the maintenance and repair of parish facilities, as well as consulting with the district council on the maintenance, repair, and improvement of highways, drainage, footpaths, public transport, and street cleaning. Conservation matters (including trees and listed buildings) and environmental issues are also the responsibility of the council.

For local government purposes, since 1 April 2023, the parish comes under the unitary authority of Somerset Council. Prior to this, it was part of the non-metropolitan district of South Somerset (established under the Local Government Act 1972). It was part of Wincanton Rural District before 1974.

It is also part of the Glastonbury and Somerton county constituency represented in the House of Commons of the Parliament of the United Kingdom. It elects one Member of Parliament (MP) by the first past the post system of election.

== Landmarks ==
Inwood House was built in 1881 by the Welsh industrialist Thomas Merthyr Guest on the site of an earlier house. The circular crenellated water tower was retained, as was the small doric Temple of Laocoon and an Oriental Summerhouse. Guest married the writer Lady Theodora Guest who died here in 1924.

== Transport ==
The village is situated at the junction of the A30 and A357 roads. Henstridge railway station was on the former Somerset and Dorset Joint Railway, and is now the location of the Gartell Light Railway

Just east of the village is Henstridge Airfield (ICAO code – EGHS). It was built during the Second World War as a training base for the Fleet Air Arm, which commissioned it as HMS Dipper. Visitors can still see the concrete outline of an aircraft carrier deck embedded into the one surviving runway. The Ministry of Defence sold the airfield in 1957 and today it is mainly used as a base for general aviation and is an active training centre for autogyros (gyrocopters). The airfield is the base for the Dorset and Somerset Air Ambulance. The airfield also hosts a weekly parkrun.

== Religious sites ==
The parish Church of St Nicholas dates from the 12th century, but was largely rebuilt in 1872–3 by J.M Allen.

The two former chapels in the High Street are now private residences.
