= Spetisbury railway station =

Former railway station in Dorset, England

Coordinates: 50.8191°N 2.1235°W

Spetisbury
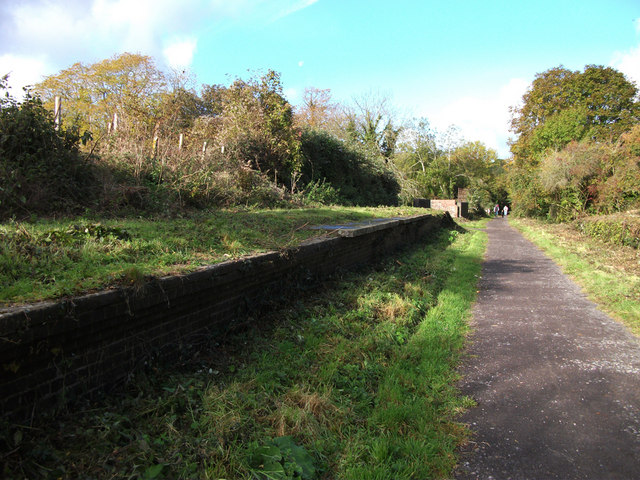
- Before restoration started taken in October 2010

General information
- Location: Spetisbury, Dorset; England
- Grid reference: ST913022
- Platforms: 2

Other information
- Status: Disused

History
- Original company: Dorset Central Railway
- Pre-grouping: Somerset and Dorset Joint Railway
- Post-grouping: Somerset and Dorset Joint Railway; Southern Region of British Railways

Key dates
- 1 November 1860: Opened (Spetisbury)
- 13 August 1934: Renamed (Spetisbury Halt)
- 17 September 1956: Closed
Location

Spetisbury railway station was a station in the English county of Dorset. It was located between Blandford Forum and Bailey Gate on the Somerset and Dorset Joint Railway. The station consisted of two platforms, a station building, signal box and shelters.

The 'down' platform is the station's original platform, which opened on 1 November 1860 with a timber booking office and waiting rooms. The platform was extended and a separate brick-built ladies' waiting room was provided in 1888. The concrete floor and fireplace extant today is the foundation of this building. During reconstruction of the station around 1900 when double track was laid, this platform was again extended to a total length of 300 ft. It then became the 'down' platform for trains to Bailey Gate, Broadstone, Poole and Bournemouth (West). Also visible are the different methods of construction where this platform has been extended.

The 'up' platform is 300 ft long and was built during reconstruction of the station around 1900. It was used for trains to Blandford, Templecombe, Evercreech Junction (change for the Burnham-on-Sea branch) and Bath (Queen Square now Green Park). This platform opened on 29 April 1901 and was provided with a brick station building containing a booking office, waiting rooms and lavatories. The rear wall of this building still survives as a retaining wall for the field behind the station. The foundations of the various rooms with the three fireplaces can still be seen today.

== History ==
The station was opened on 1 November 1860 by the London and South Western Railway as part of the Dorset Central Railway, and later became part of the Somerset and Dorset Joint Railway. The station became an unstaffed halt in 1934. Becoming part of the Southern Region of British Railways when the railways were nationalised in 1948, the halt was closed in 1956 as part of an economy campaign. Passenger trains continued to pass the site until the S&DJR closed in 1966. The railway was still open until the closure of the goods terminal at Blandford in 1969 and later that year the track was lifted.

== Spetisbury Station Project ==
The station site is currently being looked after by the Spetisbury Station Project Group, whose long-term ambition is to reconstruct the buildings as an information centre for the station and Somerset & Dorset railway.

Preceding station	Disused railways	Following station
Bailey Gate; Line and station closed	Somerset & Dorset Joint Railway; LSWR and Midland Railways	Charlton Marshall; Line and station closed

== See also ==
- New Somerset and Dorset Railway
