= New Somerset and Dorset Railway =

Railway line in England

Coordinates: 51.3449°N 2.3452°W

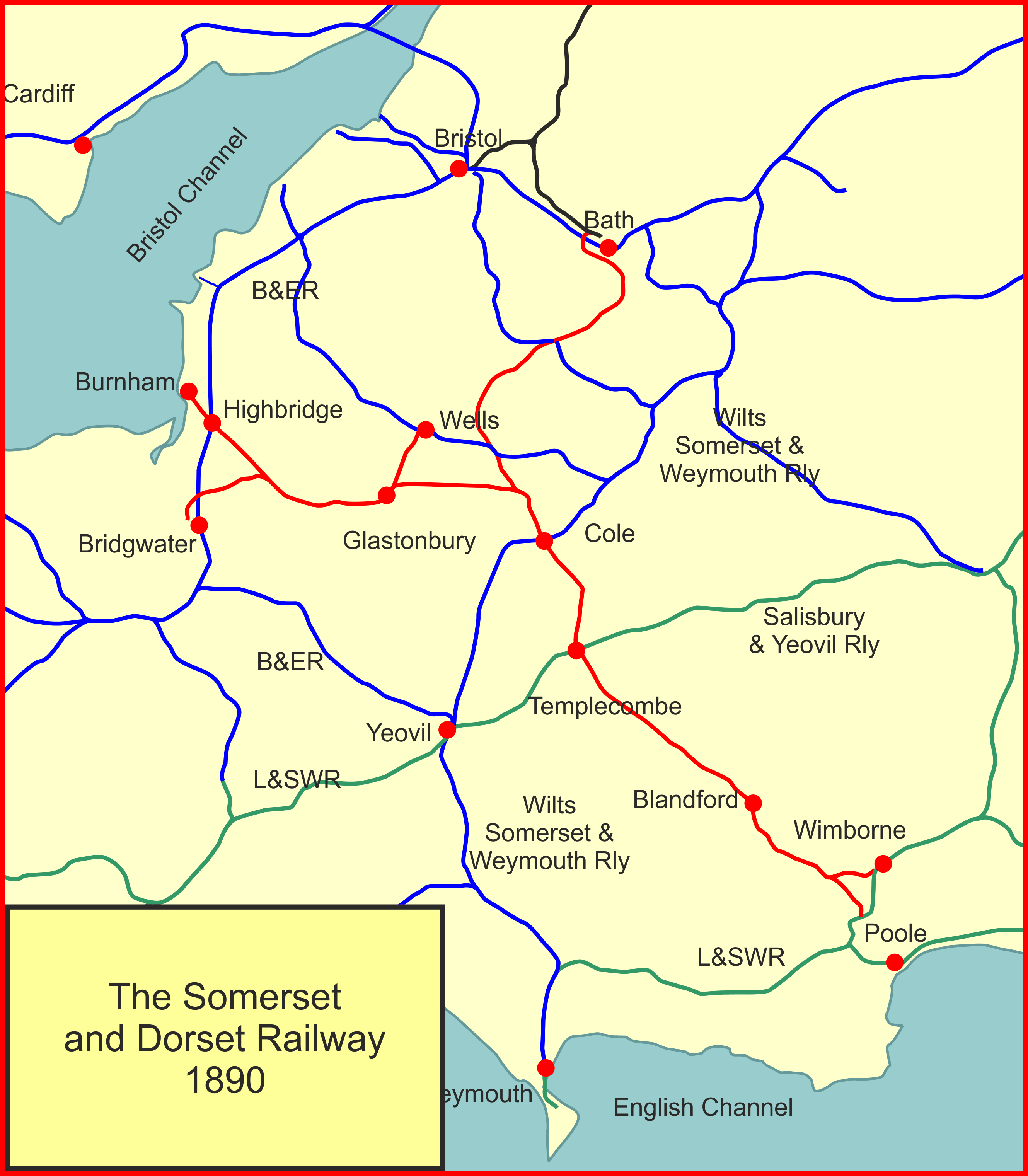
The Somerset and Dorset Railway in 1890

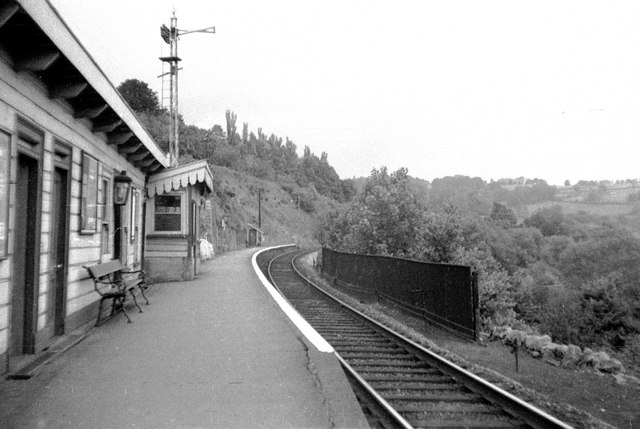
Midford Station in 1962

The remains of Midford Station in September 2007

The New Somerset and Dorset Railway, formed in early 2009, aims to restore the complete line of the Somerset and Dorset Joint Railway as a modern transport system for the 21st century. The group also has a heritage aspect, to encourage future use by steam specials, etc. Work is currently (December 2017) concentrated on five sites, Midford - Midsomer Norton - Gartell - Shillingstone - Spetisbury. Some of these are operated by independent groups.

== Midford ==
Midford station, which is owned by the New Somerset and Dorset Railway, is being restored as a cafe and information centre.

== Spetisbury ==
Work on the restoration of Spetisbury station started in May 2012.

== Other groups ==
Other groups are restoring other parts of the railway. These include:

- The Somerset & Dorset Railway Heritage Trust at Midsomer Norton railway station
- The North Dorset Railway (formerly the Shillingstone Railway Project) at Shillingstone railway station
- The Gartell Light Railway, a narrow gauge heritage railway which runs partly along the track of the old Somerset and Dorset Joint Railway

Some of the track has been restored as a surfaced cycleway and footpath: the Two Tunnels Greenway on much of the track from Bath to Midsomer Norton including Devonshire and Combe Down Tunnels, and some of the track south of Sturminster Newton as the North Dorset Trailway.
