= Yenston =

Hamlet in Somerset, England

Coordinates: 50.98°N 02.41°W

Yenston is a small hamlet in Somerset within the Parish of Henstridge. Located on the A357, the hamlet is located between Templecombe and Henstridge.

Over the years the hamlet has seen a number of changes. Back in the 1950s, the village had three pubs, a Methodist Church and a Village Shop Since then the pubs and shop have changed into dwellings, the village life is based around homelife.

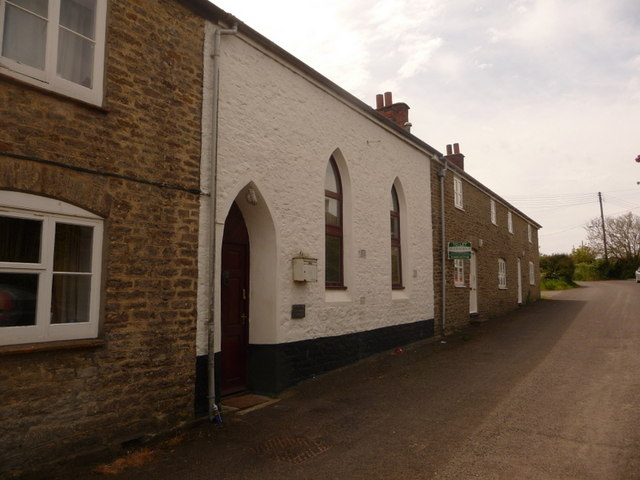
Yenston, former Methodist chapel - geograph.org.uk - 1318502

Yenston's major feature is the Gartell Light Railway, which allows you to travel behind Steam & Diesel hauled trains on the old Somerset & Dorset Joint Railway through the heart of Blackmore Vale. The Gartell Railway is open on a limited calendar.

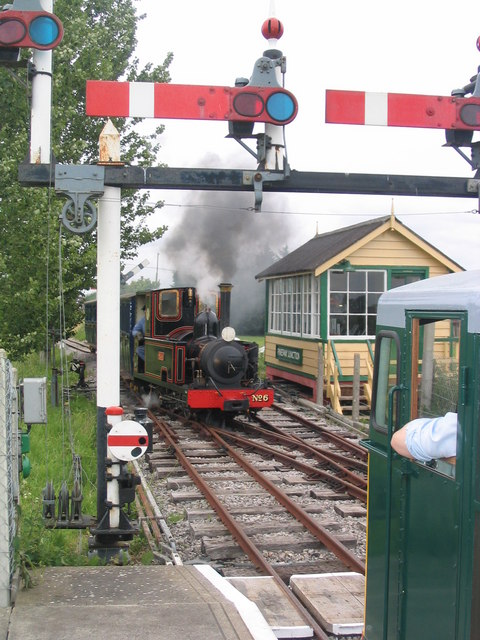
Gartell Light Railway-by-TIM-CHAPMAN

Other features of the village consist of the Yenston Stone (created in 2000) and the red telephone box within the centre of the village.

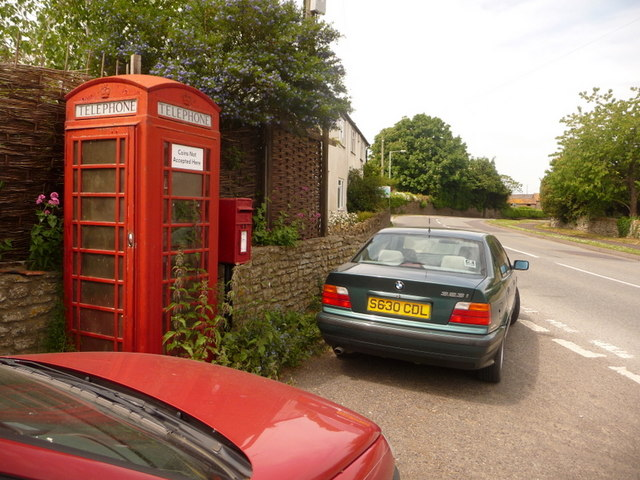
Yenston red telephone box

The telephone box now contains a defibrillator.

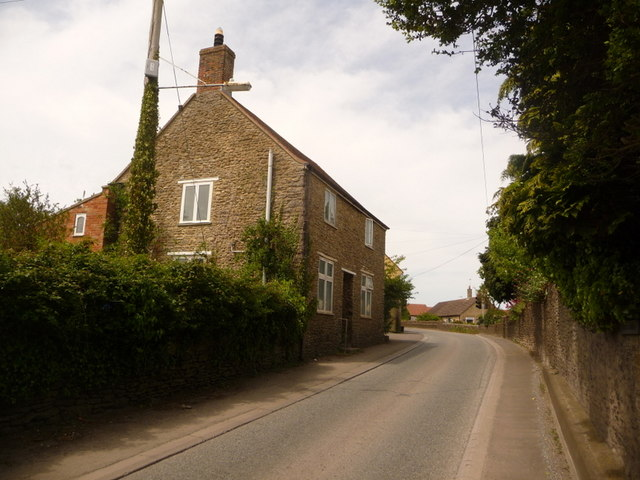
Yenston, the old village store - geograph.org.uk - 1318511
