= Charlton Marshall Halt railway station =

Disused railway station in England

Coordinates: 50.83537°N 2.14701°W

Charlton Marshall Halt
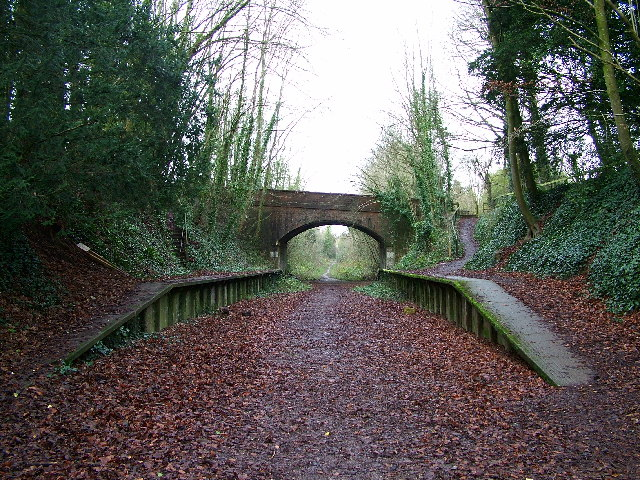

General information
- Location: Charlton Marshall, Dorset; England
- Grid reference: ST897039
- Platforms: 2

Other information
- Status: Disused

History
- Post-grouping: SR; Southern Region of British Railways

Key dates
- 5 July 1928: Opened
- 17 September 1956: Closed (except for special school trains)
- 17 December 1963: last used by schools trains
Location

Charlton Marshall Halt was a station in the English county of Dorset. It was located between Blandford Forum and Bailey Gate on the Somerset and Dorset Joint Railway. The station consisted of two short platforms and shelters.

== History ==
The station was opened on 5 July 1928 by the Southern Railway. It became part of the Southern Region of British Railways when the railways were nationalised in 1948. The halt was closed in 1956 as part of an economy campaign. It was also used by special trains for Clayesmore Preparatory School until the last such usage on 17 December 1963. There were 2 carriages which started from Waterloo attached to one of the regular main line trains and these carriages were un-coupled from the main line train and coupled to a local train to go to Charlton Marshall Halt. There was a train at the beginning and end of each school term; thus there were 6 trains that stopped at the halt every year. Trains continued to pass the site until the S&DJR closed in 1966.

The track was finally lifted in 1969, as the railway was still open until the closure of the goods terminal at Blandford that year. The site was in a cutting, which now form part of a footpath and bridleway.

Preceding station	Disused railways	Following station
Spetisbury; Line and station closed	London and South Western Railway; Somerset & Dorset Joint Railway	Blandford Forum; Line and station closed
