= Charlton Marshall =

Village and civil parish in Dorset, England

Coordinates: 50.8345°N 2.1408°W

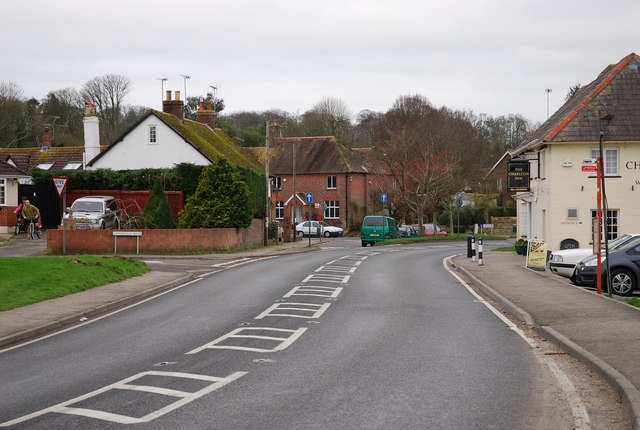
- Charlton Marshall

- Location within Dorset
- Population: 1,156
- OS grid reference: ST903038
- Unitary authority: Dorset
- Ceremonial county: Dorset
- Region: South West
- Country: England
- Sovereign state: United Kingdom
- Post town: BLANDFORD FORUM
- Postcode district: DT11
- Police: Dorset
- Fire: Dorset and Wiltshire
- Ambulance: South Western
- UK Parliament: North Dorset

Charlton Marshall is a village and civil parish in the English county of Dorset. It lies within the Dorset administrative district, on the A350 road 2 miles (3 kilometres) south of the market town of Blandford Forum. It is sited on a river terrace above the floodplain of the River Stour, with most of the land in the parish stretching south-west over chalk hills. In the 2011 census the number of dwellings recorded within the parish was 513 and the population was 1,156.

Within the parish boundary is evidence of the sites of Anglo-Saxon burial mounds, and human habitation in the parish can be dated back at least a thousand years. Next to the river were three earlier settlements, which influenced the elongated layout of the current village. The parish church was rebuilt in 1713 and restored in 1895, although the tower dates from the 15th century. Charlton Marshall Halt railway station was once a halt on the Somerset and Dorset Joint Railway.

Within the last half century Charlton Marshall has grown considerably, and there are now more than five times as many homes in the village as there were in the middle of the 19th century. A proposal to jointly bypass Charlton Marshall and neighbouring Spetisbury has never been realised.

== Governance ==
Charlton Marshall civil parish was in Riversdale electoral ward, which also includes Spetisbury civil parish to the south. The total ward population in the 2011 census was 1,711.

After 2019 structural changes to local government in England, Charlton Marshall is part of the Winterborne North ward which elects 1 member to Dorset Council.
