= Sturminster Newton railway station =

Former railway station in England

Coordinates: 50.9270°N 2.3031°W

Sturminster Newton
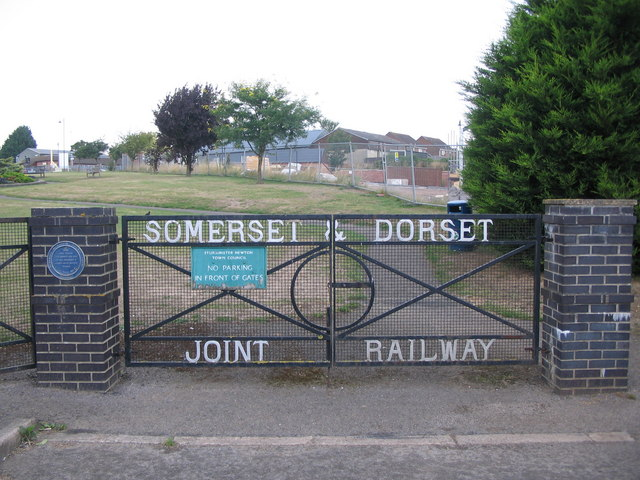
- Entrance to site of former station

General information
- Location: Sturminster Newton, Dorset; England
- Grid reference: ST789141
- Platforms: 2

Other information
- Status: Disused

History
- Pre-grouping: Somerset and Dorset Joint Railway
- Post-grouping: SR and LMSR; Southern Region of British Railways

Key dates
- 31 August 1863: Opened
- 7 March 1966: Closed
Location

Sturminster Newton railway station was a station in the town of Sturminster Newton, in the English county of Dorset. It was located on the Somerset and Dorset Joint Railway.

== History ==
The station was opened on 31 August 1863 by the London and South Western Railway as part of the Dorset Central Railway. A passing place on a stretch of single line, the station had two platforms with shelters, and a small goods yard. This and the passing loop were controlled from a signal box.

The station become part of the Southern Region of British Railways when the railways were nationalised in 1948.

The goods yard gave milk trains access to the private sidings of the local creamery. Started in 1913 by local farmers to produce cheddar cheese and pasteurised milk, it was taken over by the Milk Marketing Board in 1937. Milk trains ceased in 1966 upon closure of the line, with the creamery remaining in operation until 2000, when it was closed by owners Dairy Crest.

The station was closed when the Somerset & Dorset Joint Railway closed on 7 March 1966 and subsequently demolished leaving no trace of the station.

== Subsequent usage ==
As of 2022, the site is a trading estate, arts centre and small park with a set of commemorative gates at the entrance.

Preceding station	Disused railways	Following station
Shillingstone; Line and station closed	Somerset & Dorset Joint Railway; LSWR and Midland Railways	Stalbridge; Line and station closed
