= Stourpaine and Durweston railway station =

Former railway station in England

Coordinates: 50.8815°N 2.1998°W

Stourpaine and Durweston
- Running in board preserved in the wall of a children's playground in Durweston

General information
- Location: Durweston, Dorset; England
- Grid reference: ST860091
- Platforms: 1

Other information
- Status: Disused

History
- Post-grouping: Southern Railway; Southern Region of British Railways

Key dates
- 9 July 1928: Opened
- 15 September 1956: Closed
Location

Stourpaine & Durweston Halt was a railway station in the English county of Dorset. It was located between Shillingstone and Blandford Forum on the Somerset & Dorset Joint Railway. The station consisted of a small concrete platform and shelter.

== History ==
Stourpaine & Durweston Halt was opened on 9 July 1928 by the Southern Railway on the Somerset & Dorset Joint Railway (S&DJR). It became part of the Southern Region of British Railways when the railways were nationalised in 1948. The halt was closed on 15 September 1956. Trains continued to pass the site until the S&DJR closed in 1966.

== The site today ==
The site is now hidden in trees off the A350 Blandford to Shaftesbury road, near the junction with the A357. Except for the simple shelter, most of the halt still survives, including the concrete posts and metal rail at the back edge of the platform

Preceding station	Disused railways	Following station
Blandford Forum; Line and station closed	Somerset & Dorset Joint Railway; London & South Western Railway and Midland Railways	Shillingstone; Line and station closed
