= Shillingstone railway station =

Former railway station in England

Coordinates: 50.9042°N 2.2506°W

Shillingstone
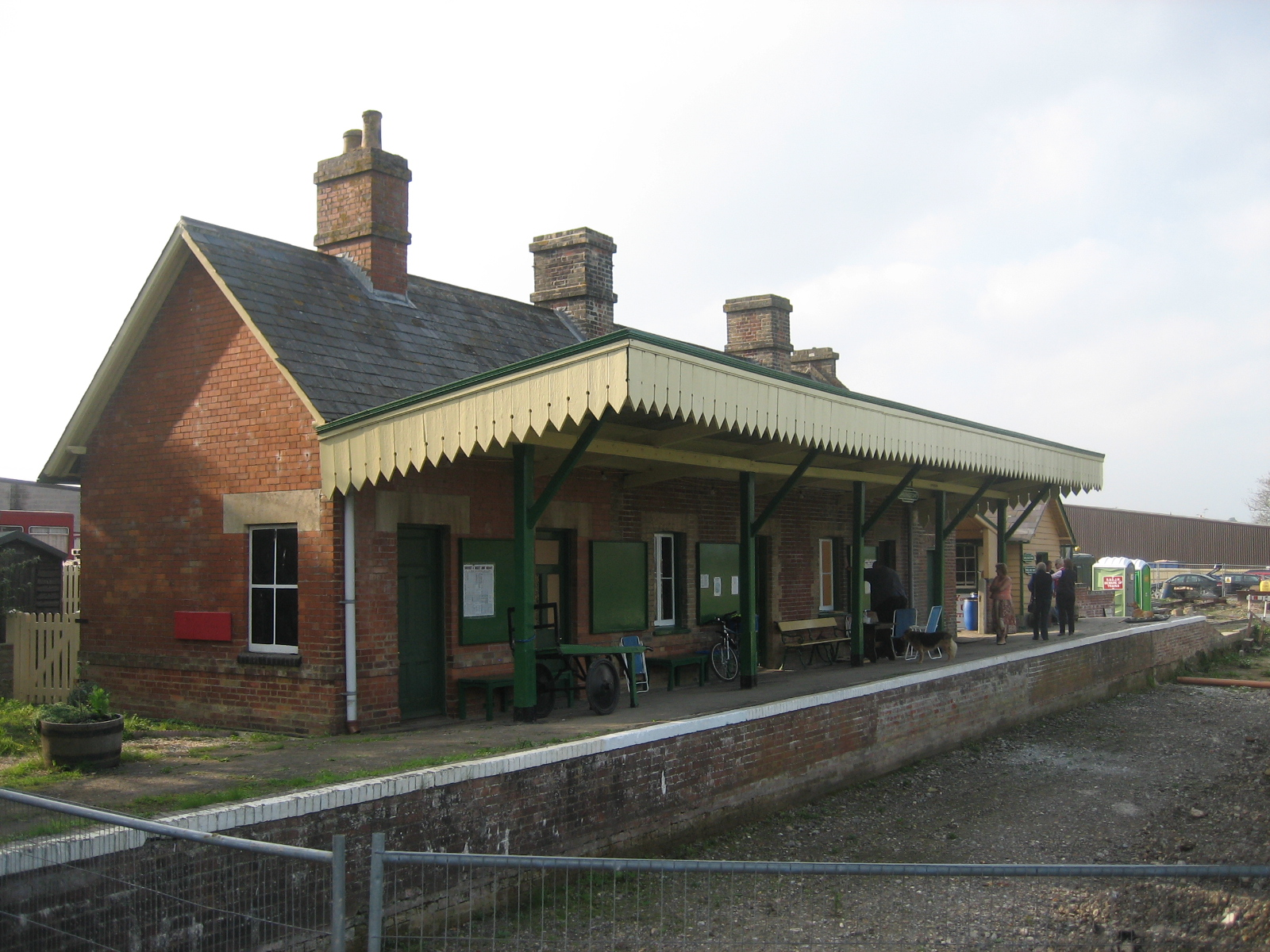
- Refurbishment underway at Shillingstone in October 2007

General information
- Location: Shillingstone, Dorset; England
- Grid reference: ST824116
- Platforms: 2

Other information
- Status: Disused

History
- Original company: Dorset Central Railway
- Pre-grouping: Somerset and Dorset Joint Railway
- Post-grouping: Somerset and Dorset Joint Railway; Southern Region of British Railways

Key dates
- 31 August 1863: Opened
- 5 April 1965: Closed to goods and services
- 7 March 1966: Closed to passengers
Location

Shillingstone railway station was a station on the Somerset and Dorset Joint Railway (S&DJR), serving the village of Shillingstone in the English county of Dorset. Shillingstone is the last surviving example of a station built by the Dorset Central Railway (one of the forerunners of the S&DJR).

The station closed in 1966, when services were withdrawn from the S&DJR route. Since 2001, enthusiasts have been working to reopen the station as a heritage railway attraction. The main building has now been renovated and opened to the public as a museum, shop, and refreshment room in 2008.

== History ==
The station was opened on 31 August 1863 by the Somerset and Dorset Railway, although planned and designed by one of its two predecessors, the Dorset Central Railway. Initial train services were provided by the London and South Western Railway (LSWR). In 1875, the Midland Railway and the LSWR together took over a joint lease of the line, forming the Somerset and Dorset Joint Railway.

At the 'Grouping' of 1923, the Somerset & Dorset Railway Company was dissolved, the lease terminated, and the line and stations became the joint property of the Southern Railway and the London Midland and Scottish Railway companies.

Shillingstone station became part of the Southern Region of British Railways when the railways were nationalised in 1948. The regional boundaries later changed several times, and the station was subsequently transferred to the Western Region, the final (January 1963) boundary being somewhere between Shillingstone and Blandford.

After a prolonged run-down of services, including the closure of freight and goods services on 5 April 1965, the station was closed, along with the remaining former S&DJR lines, on 7 March 1966, as a result of the Beeching Axe. The station was fully staffed until closure. Track-lifting commenced in 1967, Shillingstone being tackled between March and May. The signal box and platform shelters were demolished at this time, and the last train through the station was the demolition train, hauled by a small diesel shunter.

Dorset County Council purchased the trackbed for a proposed Shillingstone by-pass. Various furniture manufacturing companies were sited in the station yard, over the years, occupying industrial buildings constructed in the late 1970s, some of them making partial use of the station building. By December 2002, the by-pass plan had been shelved, and the station was unoccupied. Dorset County Council decided to dispose of the redundant station, and, after protracted negotiations, the North Dorset Railway Trust took over the lease in July 2005, intending to re-open the station as a heritage railway attraction. Restoration work commenced in 2003 and has continued steadily since then (see "Shillingstone Railway Project").

A length of trackbed around Shillingstone has been opened as a section of the North Dorset Trailway, providing an easy-access route for walkers, cyclists and horse riders. At Shillingstone station, the trailway is routed up and along the down platform, providing a clear view of the restored buildings.

== Configuration ==
The station is located on the outskirts of the village, to the north-east. It has two platforms, with brick buildings on the 'up' (north-bound) platform and (originally) a simple wooden waiting shelter on the much longer 'down' platform. The main station building has a substantial wooden awning over the platform. During its original working life, lighting was provided by oil lamps, there being no electricity supply. (A supply has since been installed.)

The station was important as one of the passing places on the single-line between Templecombe and Blandford. The passing loop, new down platform and signal box were opened in 1878; in later years the loop was 511 yards (467 m) long, as measured between the facing points at each end, compared with 514 yards (470 m) at Stalbridge. There was a small goods yard to the north of the station, on the up side, with a cattle dock, a small goods shed, and a 5-ton crane. There was a siding at the north end of the passing loop on the down side, and another just to the south of the station (also on the down side and installed in 1901) which could accommodate a 14-coach train. The yard, the sidings, and the passing loop were controlled from a signal box at the north end of the up platform.

== Shillingstone Railway Project ==
The 21st century has seen the station taken on by the Shillingstone Railway Project (North Dorset Railway Trust or NDRT). The medium-term aim is to restore the current lease area (46 miles 58 1/2 chains (75.21 km) to 46 mi 76 1/2 chains (75.57 km) from Bath Junction) which equates to 1,200 feet (366 m) of single track mainline with loop through the platforms.

== Services ==
Preceding station	Disused railways	Following station
Stourpaine and Durweston Halt; Line and station closed	Somerset & Dorset Joint Railway; LSWR and Midland Railways	Sturminster Newton; Line and station closed

To re-build Shillingstone Station and surroundings to as it appeared in 1950-1960 and to help to educate for future generations. Founded Around the late 1990s the North Dorset Railway Trust (which supports The Shillingstone Station Project) was formed by Michael Paulley and this is when the hard work, negotiation, letter writing and publicity begin in earnest.
