= Blandford Forum railway station =

Disused railway station in North Dorset, England

Coordinates: 50.85970°N 2.16050°W

Blandford Forum
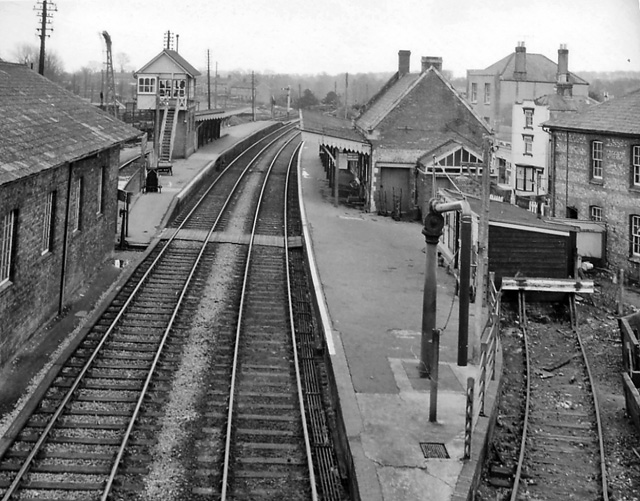
- Blandford Forum railway station in April 1963

General information
- Location: Blandford Forum, Dorset; England
- Grid reference: ST888067
- Platforms: 2

Other information
- Status: Disused

History
- Original company: Somerset and Dorset Railway
- Pre-grouping: Somerset & Dorset Joint Railway
- Post-grouping: Southern Region of British Railways

Key dates
- 31 August 1863: Opened as Blandford
- 21 September 1953: Renamed Blandford Forum
- 7 March 1966: Closed for passengers
- 1969: Closed for goods
Location

Blandford Forum railway station served the town of Blandford Forum, in Dorset, England. It was a stop on the Somerset & Dorset Joint Railway, which connected Bath with Bournemouth.

== History ==
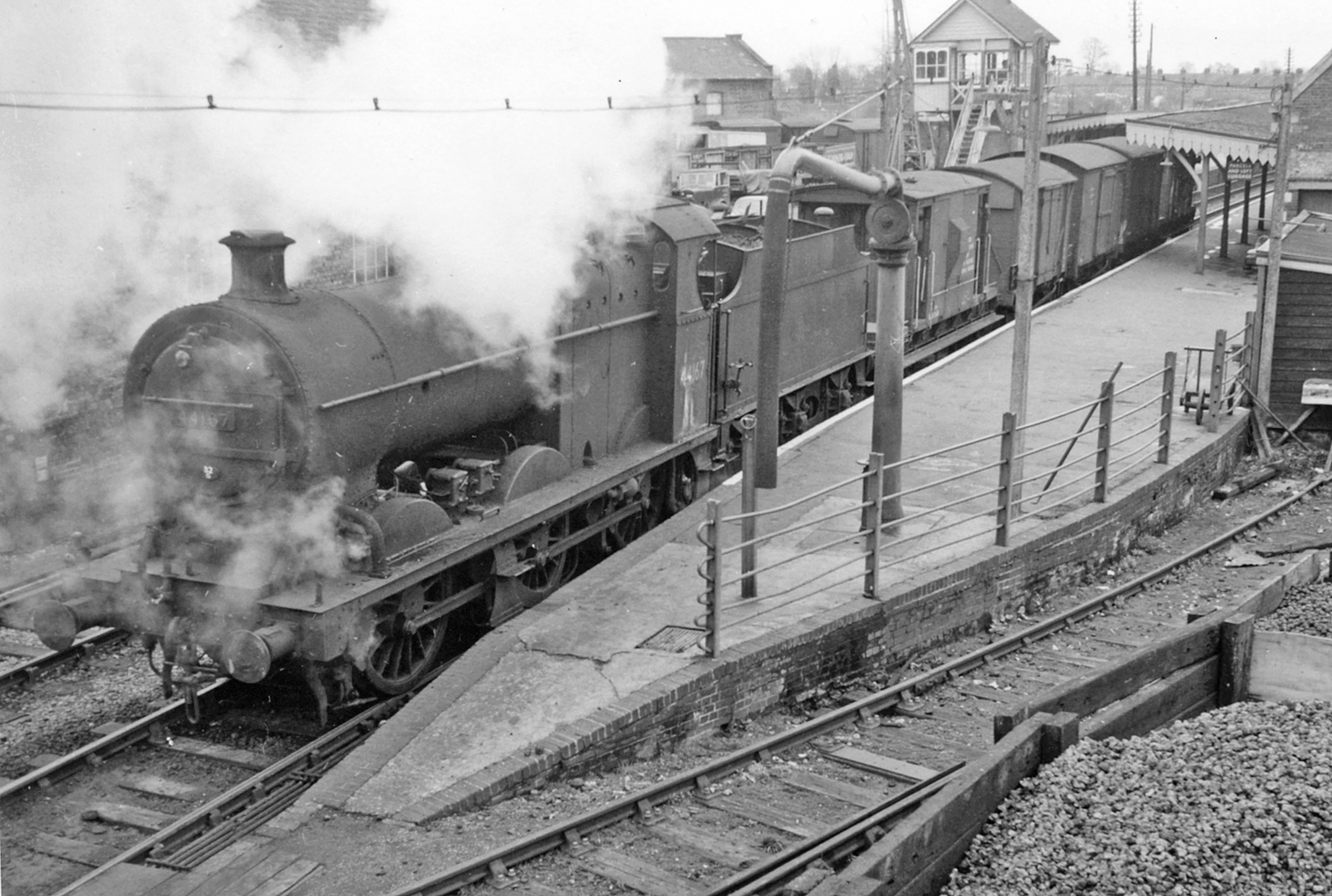
An Up freight train at Blandford Forum station in 1963

Originally part of the Dorset Central Railway, the line to Blandford opened on 1 November 1860 to a station at Blandford St Mary, to the south of the River Stour. The Dorset Central merged with the Somerset Central Railway in 1862 and a new extension connecting the two railways was built. The extension opened on 31 August 1863, requiring a bridge over the Stour and a newly relocated Blandford Forum station to the north of the river.

The station remained open until 7 March 1966, when the entire line from Bath to Bournemouth closed to passengers. Goods traffic continued for a further three years, but the station was finally fully closed in 1969 and the track was lifted.

The impending closure of the station was lamented by musical duo Flanders & Swann, being one of some 30 stations mentioned in their 1964 song Slow Train ("No more will I go to Blandford Forum …"). The song was written in the wake of the first Beeching report, published in 1963 and was written as a tribute to the lines and stations that were to be closed.

== Today ==
The site of the station now lies within a housing estate.

A working model of Blandford station and its environs is in the process of being built in 1/76th scale at the Blandford Museum in the town centre.

Preceding station	Disused railways	Following station
Charlton Marshall; Line and station closed	Somerset & Dorset Joint Railway; LSWR & Midland Railways	Stourpaine & Durweston Halt; Line and station closed
