= Gartell Light Railway =

Steam railway in Somerset, England

Coordinates: 50°59′41″N 2°24′10″W

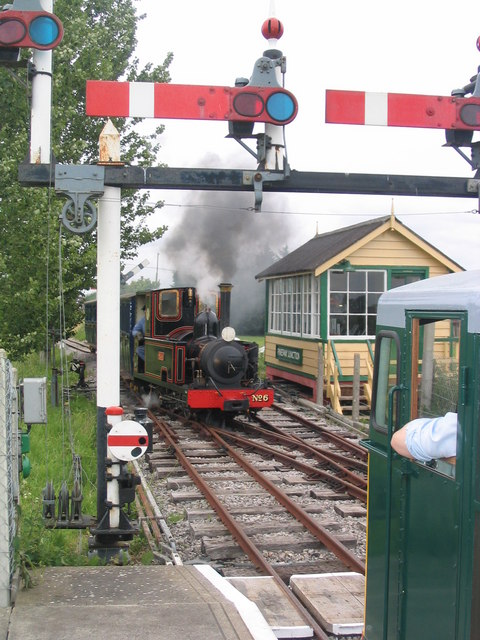

Overview
- Headquarters: Templecombe
- Locale: England
- Dates of operation: 1990–2026

Technical
- Track gauge: 2 ft (610 mm)
- Length: 3/4 mile (1.2 km)

The Gartell Light Railway was a privately run narrow gauge railway located at Yenston in the Blackmore Vale, south of Templecombe, in Somerset, England. It operates a 2 ft (610 mm) narrow gauge railway running for 3/4 mile (1.2 km), partly along the track of the old Somerset and Dorset Joint Railway. The railway has 4 stations – Common Lane, Pinesway Junction, Park Lane and Tower View.

The railway is controlled using a comprehensive signalling system operated from two signalboxes – Common lane and Pinesway Junction. Both signalboxes control a mix of semaphore and colour light signals with mechanically operated points.

The railway is open to the public on selected dates through the year when it normally operates an intensive 3 train operation with departures from Common Lane station every 20 minutes through the day between 10:30 and 16:30.

Open days will cease by the end of October 2026. The final open day is scheduled for either 25 (Sunday) or 26 (Monday) October 2026 and the line is expected to be closed in the near future.

== The route of the GLR ==
- Park Lane
- Pinesway Junction
- Tower View

== Locomotives ==
Number	Name	Builder	Type	Date	Works number	Notes
1	AMANDA	Gartell Light Railway	Bo-BoDH	2000		Ex Southend Pier Railway, rebuilt on the railway
2	ANDREW	Baguley-Drewry	4wDH	1973	3699	Acquired in 2007, Sold to Amberley Museum in 2025
5	ALISON	Alan Keef	4wDH	1993	10	
6	Mr. G	North Dorset Locomotive Works	0-4-2T	1998	698	Newly built for the line, based on the design of W.G. Bagnall locomotive Polar Bear
8	Faith	North Dorset Locomotive Works	0-4-2T			
9	Jean	Alan White	0-4-0T+T	2008		

== Accidents and incidents ==
In April 2025 a volunteer worker was seriously injured when alighting from a moving train, a practice forbidden by the rule book.

== See also ==
- British narrow gauge railways
