= Wimborne (disambiguation) =

Wimborne is a market town in Dorset, England, more formally known as Wimborne Minster.

As such, it may also refer to:

- Wimborne Market, a market in Wimborne Minster
- Wimborne Minster (church), the parish church of Wimborne Minster, itself also called Wimborne Minster
- Wimborne Minster astronomical clock, a 14th-century astronomical clock inside the church of Wimborne Minster
- Wimborne Minster Folk Festival, an annual folk festival held in Wimborne Minster
- Wimborne Model Town, a model town in Wimborne Minster
- Wimborne railway station, the former railway station in Wimborne Minster
- Wimborne Town F.C., an association football club in Wimborne Minster

Deriving from the town in Dorset, it may also refer to:

- Viscount Wimborne
- Ivor Guest, 1st Baron Wimborne
- Lady Wimborne Bridge, named after the wife of the 1st Baron
- Ivor Guest, 1st Viscount Wimborne, son of the 1st Baron
- Ivor Grosvenor Guest, 2nd Viscount Wimborne, son of the 1st Viscount
- Ivor Guest, 3rd Viscount Wimborne, son of the 2nd Viscount
- Ivor Guest, 4th Viscount Wimborne, son of the 3rd Viscount

Wimborne may also refer to:

- Wimborne St Giles, a village in Dorset, seven miles from Wimborne Minster
- Wimborne St Giles Hundred, a former hundred in Dorset
- Wimborne Road Cemetery, Bournemouth, a cemetery in Bournemouth, Dorset
- Wimborne, Alberta, a hamlet in Alberta, Canada
