= Ashington, Dorset =

Coordinates: 50.7843°N 02.0000°W

Ashington
- Hamlet
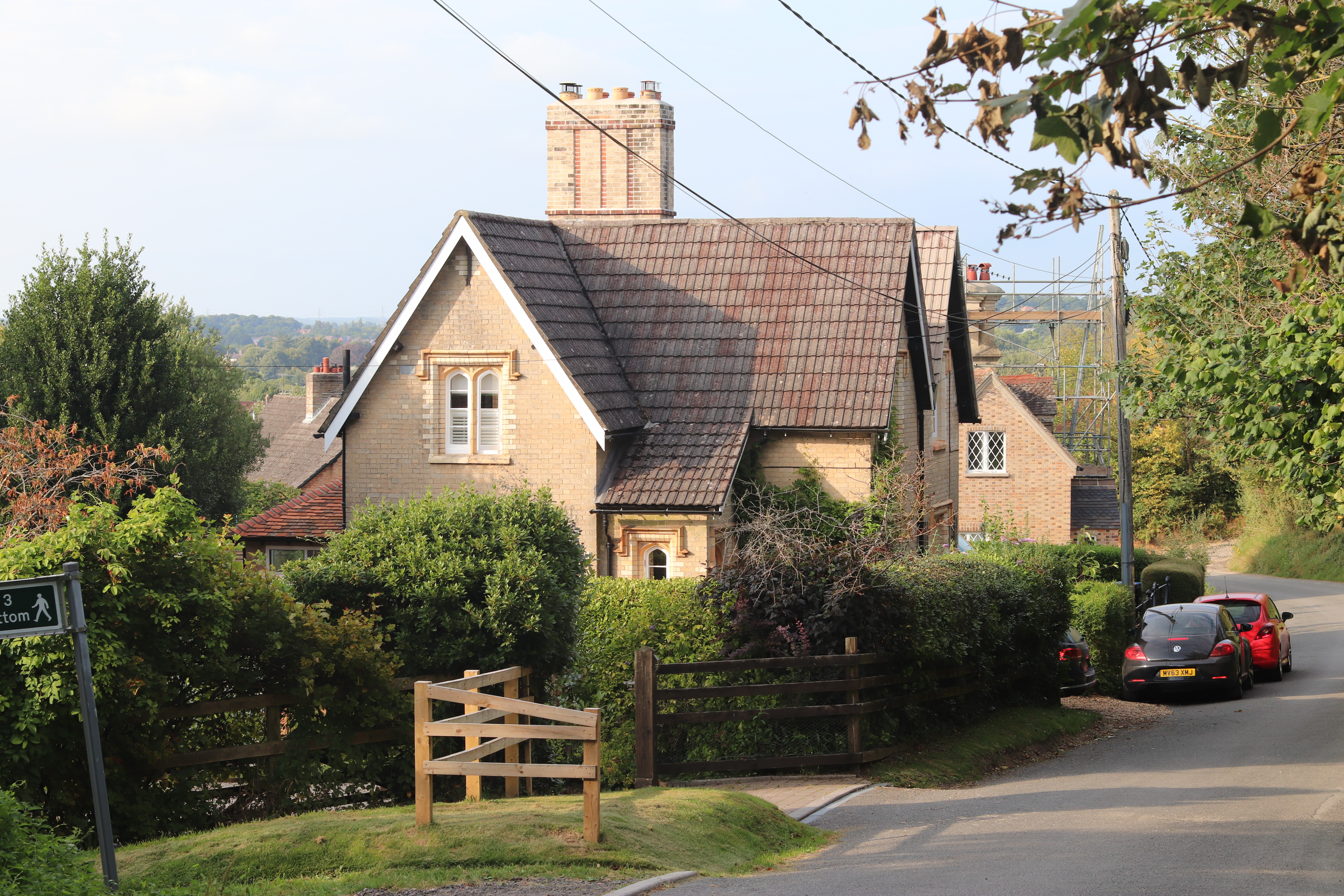
- View down Ashington Lane

- Location within Dorset
- OS grid reference: SZ0098
- Unitary authority: Bournemouth, Christchurch and Poole
- Ceremonial county: Dorset
- Region: South West
- Country: England
- Sovereign state: United Kingdom
- Post town: Wimborne
- Postcode district: BH21
- Dialling code: 01202
- Police: Dorset
- Fire: Dorset and Wiltshire
- Ambulance: South Western
- UK Parliament: Mid Dorset and North Poole

Ashington is a hamlet in Dorset, England. It is in the unitary authority of Bournemouth, Christchurch and Poole, between the village of Corfe Mullen and the market town of Wimborne Minster.

Named by the Saxons, 'Ashington' comes from the words aesc – ash, and tun – homestead or village. The timber of ash was commonly used by the Saxons for construction, as well as for tools and weapons in the same ways metal was more widely used by later generations. The leaves of ash trees provided fodder for cattle and horses, and the tree was thought to have medicinal qualities, slitting an ash trunk was seen as an answer to hernia in infants and a touch of an ash leaf was thought to cure cramp. This abundance of ash trees can still be seen in Ashington today.

Due to its close proximity to the South East Dorset conurbation urban area, Ashington is protected as part of the South East Dorset Green Belt. It contains parts of the Corfe Barrows Nature Park.

== Early history ==
=== Romans ===
In the first century AD, a Roman fortress was located at Lake Farm under the command of Vespasian, legate and future Roman emperor, who under the orders of emperor Claudius, was tasked with the subjugation of the remaining tribal groups of Britain. First discovered in 1959, the site covered an area of 40 acres (16 ha).

The fort was constructed in two phases, the first established shortly after the Roman invasion of 43 AD. After a short period of use the fort was superseded by a new one that covered a slightly smaller area, with the occupation continuing up to 65 AD, possibly garrisoned by Legio II Augusta. The fort would have been linked to a Roman supply base to the south in Hamworthy, serviced by Poole Harbour, and the remains of another road, 'Roman Road,' can still be seen heading north-west to the Roman settlement of Vindocladia (Badbury Rings).

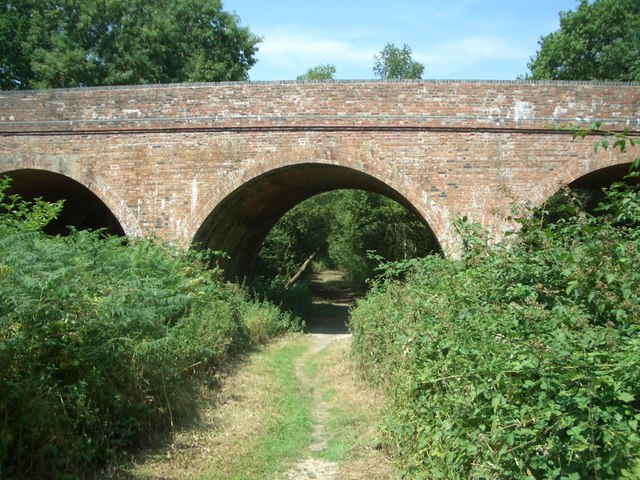
Ashington Bridge, over disused Somerset and Dorset Joint Railway line

=== Saxons ===
The Saxons probably settled in the area around the 7th century. There are two tumulus or 'burial mounds' which can be found in the Barrow Hill part of the Corfe Barrows Nature Park, serving as evidence of a Saxon presence in the area.

== 19th and 20th century ==
Between 1867 and 1903, the Guest family of Canford Manor had cottages built in the district for their estate workers, known as the 'Lady Wimborne Cottages', including 9 pairs of semi-detached cottages in Ashington. Believed to be the work of the architect Charles Barry Jr., the cottages were commissioned to improve the housing quality and living standards of labourers through establishing a homogeneous design. These were known as the De Ville style.

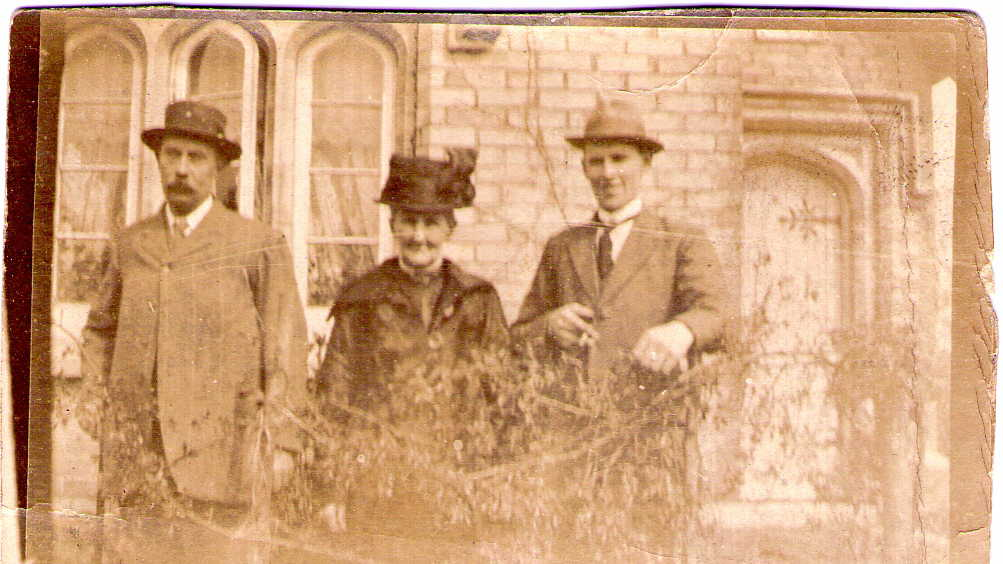
Edwardian Family stood outside 87 Merley Park Road (Ashfields)

== Somerset and Dorset Joint Railway ==
In 1885 the 'Wimborne cut-off', officially called the Poole & Bournemouth Junction Branch of the Somerset and Dorset Joint Railway was built. The railway line connected the Bailey Gate station to the Corfe Mullen Halt Station, which led to Broadstone and Poole, therefore bypassing Wimborne, leading to its decline as a railway centre. This new line involved the forming of deep cuttings and high embankments to ease gradients through Ashington, and the building of Ashington Bridge.

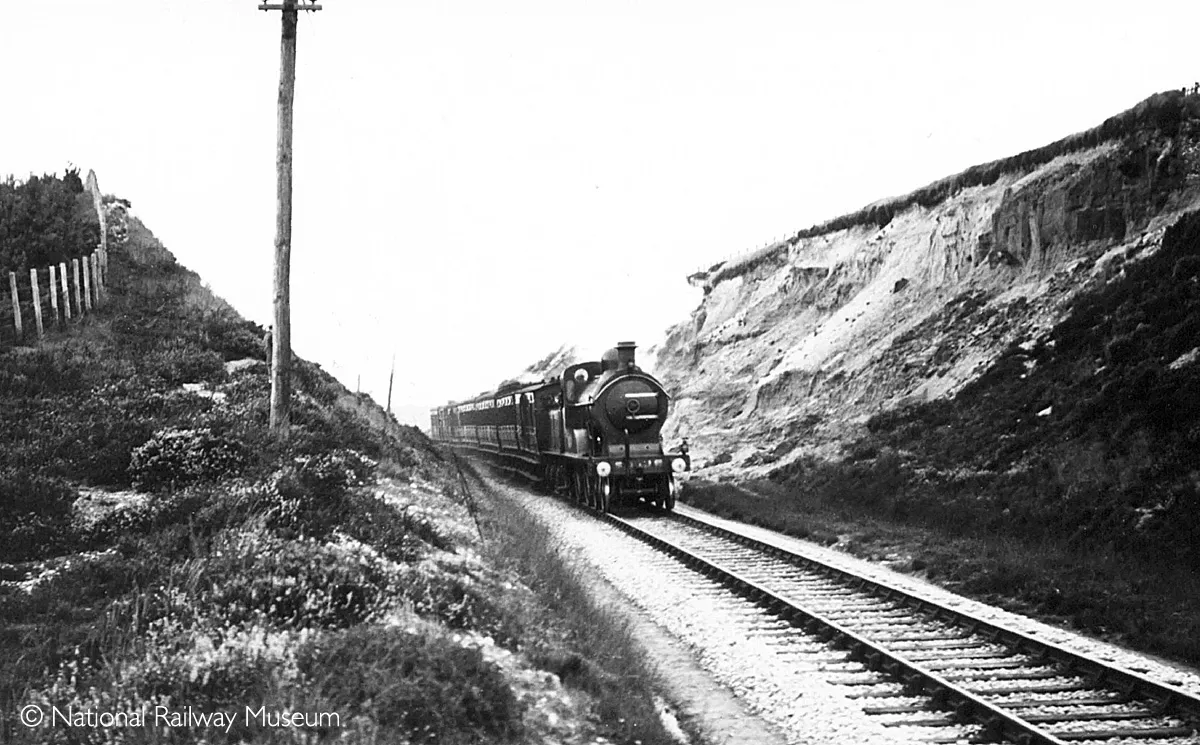
Northward view of train heading through Ashington Cutting to Broadstone. c. 1920s

In the 1960s, British Railways began a series of major route closures as part of the restructuring of the nationalised railways, referred to colloquially as the Beeching cuts. After a gradual closure of local lines, in 1970 the Blandford to Broadstone line, which ran through Ashington, was closed.

Now the disused railway line, maintained by BCP council, serves as a public nature reserve, 'Ashington Cutting,' forming a habitat of mixed deciduous woodland.

== Ashington Mission Church ==
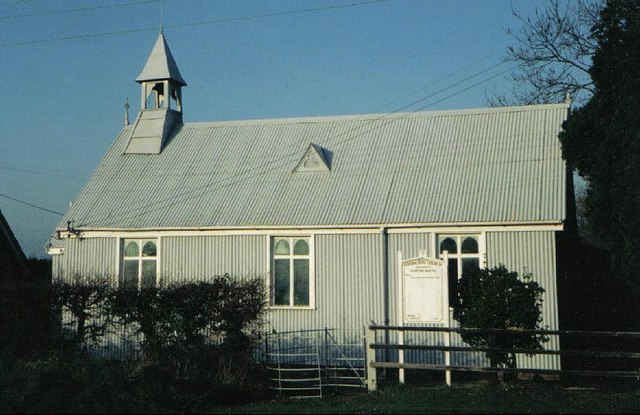
Ashington Mission Church as seen in 1993

Constructed in 1900, Ashington Mission Church was given to the parish by Mr C. Paterson, the estate agent of the Canford estate. The church was a 'tin tabernacle' built from corrugated iron likely from the catalogue of, and supplied by, Messrs Humphreys of Knightsbridge, London. It was located on a site leased from Lord Wimborne, for 1 shilling per year, by Mr Paterson.

Upon the death of his widow Ellen Paterson, a bequest of £500 was left to the vicar (G.F. Richardson) and churchwardens for the maintenance of the church.

After over a decade of disuse, the church was eventually sold and converted into a three-bedroom house, that featured in an episode of Escape to the Country.

== Notable residents ==
- George Douglas-Hamilton, 10th Earl of Selkirk – Nobleman and Conservative politician. Former First Lord of the Admiralty and Chancellor of the Duchy of Lancaster. Inherited Rose Lawn Coppice in 1957 and lived there until his death in 1994.
- John Feaver – British tennis player, represented Great Britain in the Davis Cup between 1977 and 1983. Lived in Ashfields, Merley Park Road.
- Robert Poore – Anglo-Irish first-class cricketer and British Army officer, who built and lived in Rose Lawn Coppice until his death.
