= Hamworthy Freight Branch =

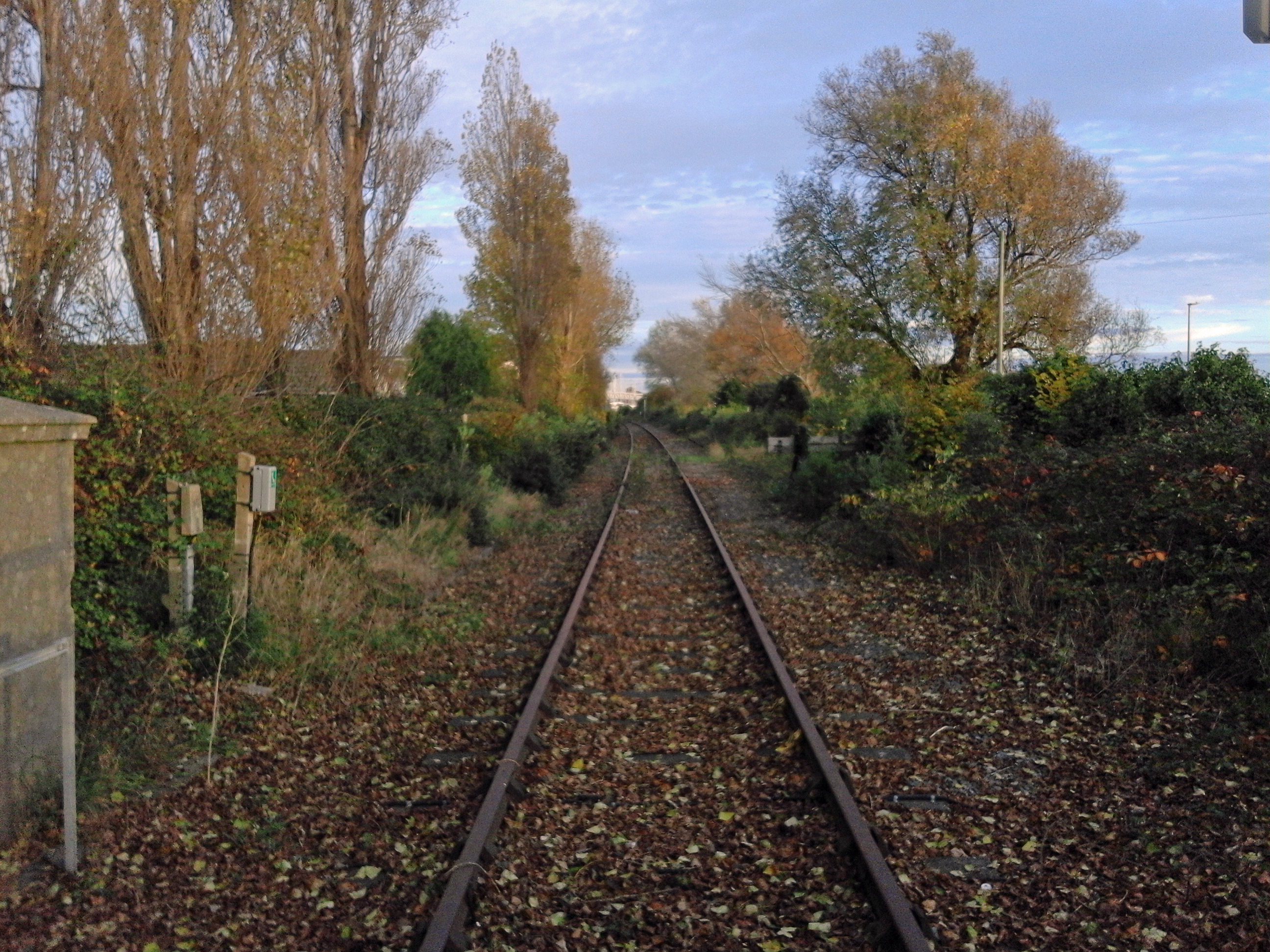
- Looking east at Hamworthy Park level crossing on the Hamworthy Freight Branch in Poole, Dorset.

Overview
- Locale: Dorset

Technical
- Line length: 2.16 miles (3.48 km)
- Track gauge: 4 ft 8 1/2 in (1,435 mm)

The Hamworthy Freight Branch is a short standard gauge line from Hamworthy Station to the Hamworthy side of Poole Harbour.

== History ==
The line was originally constructed by the Southampton and Dorchester Railway in 1847 and was the terminus for Poole via a bridge over the inlet dividing Poole and Hamworthy. A new through branch via Creekmoor opened to a new Poole railway station in 1872 which meant that passengers had a direct service to the town, and following the opening of the causeway across Holes Bay in 1893 allowing through trains to serve Poole, the Hamworthy Branch lost its passenger status in 1896.

== Locomotives ==
The line was once worked, as part of the local pick up goods rounds, by a Southern Railway B4 class 0-4-0 steam locomotive.

During the late 1960s and early 1970s the line was worked by Class 03 Drewry 0-6-0 diesel shunting locomotives numbers 03 179 and 03 083, occasionally as double headers (cab to cab) when hauling a long train of Ford transit vans on bogie flat wagons or heavy girder and sheet steel rolls on bogie bolsters. Local school children at the lineside Hamworthy Middle School were quite familiar with these locomotives and could tell from a distance which was which as 03 179 was always front towards the docks and 03 083 was always cab towards the docks.

The brake vans used were the standard BR type, occasionally carrying a bicycle on the rear platform, as the train would stop at the hand opened level crossing gates in Ashmore Avenue, a man would jump down from the locomotive, open the gates and the train would proceed through. The train would stop just clear of the gates and the bicycle would be unloaded for the man to cycle back to Poole station once he had closed the gates. On occasions the reverse would happen and the man would cycle from Poole station, open the gates, the train would pass through returning to Poole, stop and pick up the man plus bicycle on the brake van.

A frequent brake van visitor was the ex-LSWR bogie brake van, which still had faint LSWR lettering showing under the BR red oxide wood paint. This tended to be used on heavier steel trains hauled by the double headed 03 shunters.

In the late 1970s both were replaced by Class 09 0-6-0 diesel shunting locomotives.

Occasional visitors were Class 47s hauling exceptional export steel train loads during the 1970s, later Class 37s became the normal visitors as steel and other freight traffic was forwarded via the branch (mostly scrap metal to the electric arc furnaces in Cardiff).

As of 2026 the line is home to no locomotives. The Poole Harbour Company kept a 0-4-0 shunter for use on the line, but in 2011 the loco was scrapped.

== Current use ==
The branch remained connected to the mainline network for many years, but has since been cut off by the partial removal of the points at Hamworthy. Semi-permanent fences and barriers have been erected across the line near each of the level crossings in the port area. The points had been reinstalled by March 2024 and the line cleared as far as the port entrance. Further funding is being sought from the port authority to reinstate the rest of the line.

The first stone train to run in five years along the line arrived in Hamworthy on the 25 January 2017. A regular weekly service had been restored, but has since stopped.
