= Corfe Mullen Halt railway station =

Disused railway station in Dorset, England

Coordinates: 50.78598°N 2.00917°W

Corfe Mullen Halt
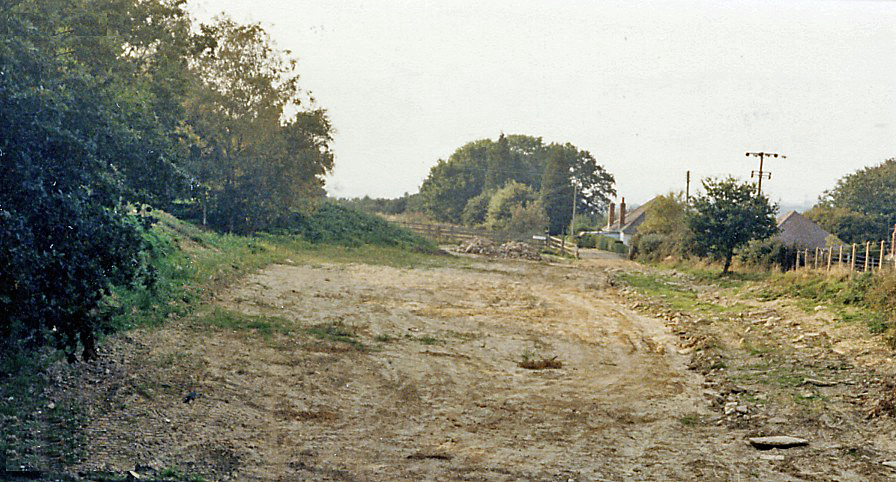
- The site of the station in 1986

General information
- Location: Corfe Mullen, Dorset; England
- Grid reference: SY99459849
- Platforms: 1

Other information
- Status: Disused

History
- Post-grouping: SR; Southern Region of British Railways

Key dates
- 27 June 1928: Opened
- 19 September 1956: Closed
Location

Corfe Mullen Halt was a station in the English county of Dorset. It was located between Bailey Gate and Broadstone stations on the Somerset and Dorset Joint Railway. This section was built to enable trains to avoid the time-consuming reversal at Wimborne. The station consisted of a single platform and shelter lit by a solitary gas lamp.

It linked the stations of Bailey Gate and Broadstone, passing through the hamlet of Ashington, thereby bypassing Wimborne for trains from the Bath and Bristol direction and starting the long process of Wimborne’s decline as a railway centre.

== History ==
The station was opened on 27 June 1928 by the Southern Railway. It became part of the Southern Region of British Railways when the railways were nationalised in 1948. The halt was closed in 1956 as part of an economy campaign. The line through the station continued to be used by passenger trains until 1966 and afterwards by goods trains for the terminal at Blandford Forum until 1969. Later that year the track was lifted.

The site was in a cutting, which has now been filled in and is the garden of a house.

Preceding station	Disused railways	Following station
Broadstone; Line and station closed	Somerset & Dorset Joint Railway; LSWR and Midland Railways	Bailey Gate; Line and station closed
