= Hamworthy railway station =

Railway station in Dorset, England

Coordinates: 50°43′30″N 2°01′10″W

Hamworthy
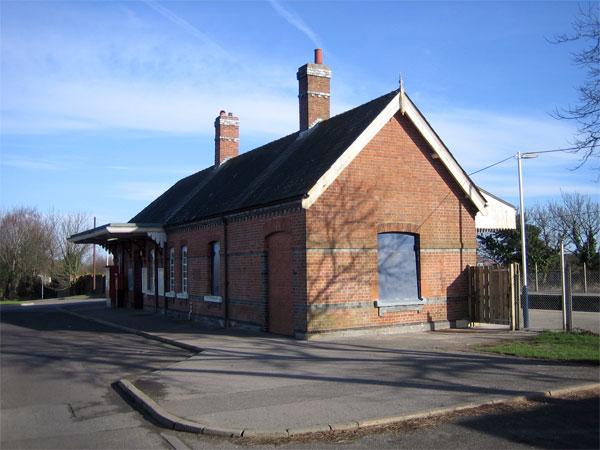
- Station building

General information
- Location: Hamworthy; Bournemouth, Christchurch and Poole; England
- Grid reference: SY987917
- Managed by: South Western Railway
- Platforms: 2

Other information
- Station code: HAM
- Classification: DfT category E

History
- Original company: Southampton and Dorchester Railway
- Pre-grouping: London and South Western Railway
- Post-grouping: Southern Railway

Key dates
- 1 June 1847: Opened as Poole Junction'
- 2 December 1872: Renamed Hamworthy Junction
- c. 1973: Renamed Hamworthy

Passengers
- 2020/21: ▼44,902
- 2021/22: ▲0.103 million
- 2022/23: ▲0.116 million
- 2023/24: ▲0.127 million
- 2024/25: ▲0.145 million
Location
Notes
- Passenger statistics from the Office of Rail and Road

Hamworthy railway station serves Hamworthy, an area of Poole in Dorset, England. It is a stop on the South West Main Line, located 115 miles 77 chains (186.6 km) down the line from London Waterloo.

== History ==
The station opened with the Southampton & Dorchester Railway, which later became part of the London and South Western Railway (LSWR), in 1847 as Poole Junction, being the junction of the main line with the spur to the port of Poole. At that time the line to London Waterloo then went via Broadstone, Wimborne and Ringwood before following what is now the South West Main Line from Brockenhurst. When the current Poole station opened in 1872, the station was renamed Hamworthy Junction and remained so until the 1970s. A causeway across Holes Bay opened in 1893 enabling through trains from London to Weymouth to serve Poole directly.

=== Motive power depot ===
A motive power depot with a coal stage was built at the station by the LSWR in 1847. It was closed by British Railways in 1954 and after several years in use as a storage facility, was eventually demolished.

== Services ==
The station is served by South Western Railway who currently operate an average of one train per hour (two on Saturdays) in each direction with trains going to London, Brockenhurst, Wareham and Weymouth. With a journey time of around 4 minutes the train is the fastest method of travel between Poole town centre and the area surrounding the station compared to the morebus bus service which takes around 14 minutes (not including delays caused by Poole Lifting Bridge).

Until 1967, trains through the station were normally steam hauled. Between 1967 and 1988, passenger services were normally provided by Class 33/1 diesel locomotives with Class 438 coaching stock (also known as 4-TC units). The line was electrified in 1988, using the standard British Rail Southern Region direct current third rail at 750 volts. Class 442 electric multiple units were initially used following electrification, until being displaced by Class 444 electric multiple units in 2007.

Preceding station	National Rail	Following station
Poole	South Western Railway; South West Main Line	Holton Heath or Wareham
	Disused railways	
Broadstone line and station closed	Southampton and Dorchester Railway	Wareham line and station open
Broadstone line and station closed	Southampton and Dorchester Railway; Port of Poole branch	Lake Halt line open, station closed

== Facilities ==
The platforms are able to accommodate trains of up to five coaches. Longer passenger trains are rarely seen past Poole. The station does not have a footbridge but has an underpass that also serves as a public footpath from Turlin Moor to Hamworthy. There was a foot crossing at the Poole end of the station for passenger in wheelchairs or with heavy luggage but this has been removed and access to the platform end fenced off. A light indicating if it is safe to cross remains at the end of platform 1 but is permanently switched off.

Hamworthy was one of two South West Trains stations not to receive a Scheidt & Bachmann Ticket XPress self-service ticket machine to replace the former "Quickfare" (Ascom B8050) machine installed during the Network SouthEast era due to fears of vandalism, although tickets could be bought from the ticket office at certain times of the day and a permit to travel could be purchased at all times. The Quickfare machine was removed in October 2006. South West Trains installed a Scheidt & Bachmann Ticket XPress self-service ticket machine in August 2008 and removed the permit to travel machine. The ticket machine is fitted with a security shutter and casing to protect it from vandalism.

This is the junction where the Hamworthy Freight Branch to Poole docks joins the main line. There is a disused third platform at the station facing the Poole docks line. The signal box which controlled the branch was at the Poole end of platform 2 but has since been demolished.

Until recently, Hamworthy had the only remaining semaphore signal on the South West Main Line, but this was removed in May 2014 as part of the signaling upgrade scheme.
