= George Douglas-Hamilton, 10th Earl of Selkirk =

British nobleman and Conservative politician

Group Captain The Right Honourable The Earl of Selkirk KT GCMG GBE AFC AE PC QC
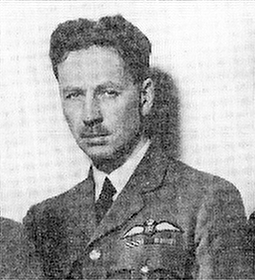

First Lord of the Admiralty
- In office 14 January 1957 – 14 October 1959
- Preceded by: The Viscount Hailsham
- Succeeded by: The Lord Carrington

Chancellor of the Duchy of Lancaster
- In office 20 December 1955 – 13 January 1957
- Prime Minister: Anthony Eden; Harold Macmillan
- Preceded by: The Earl of Woolton
- Succeeded by: Charles Hill

Personal details
- Born: 4 January 1906 Merley, Wimborne
- Died: 24 November 1994 (aged 88) Ashington, Dorset
- Spouse: Audrey Sale-Barker (m. 1947)

Military service
- Allegiance: United Kingdom
- Branch/service: Royal Air Force
- Rank: Group Captain
- Commands: No. 603 (City of Edinburgh) Squadron (1934–38)
- Battles/wars: Second World War
- Awards: Officer of the Order of the British Empire; Air Force Cross; Mentioned in Despatches (2)

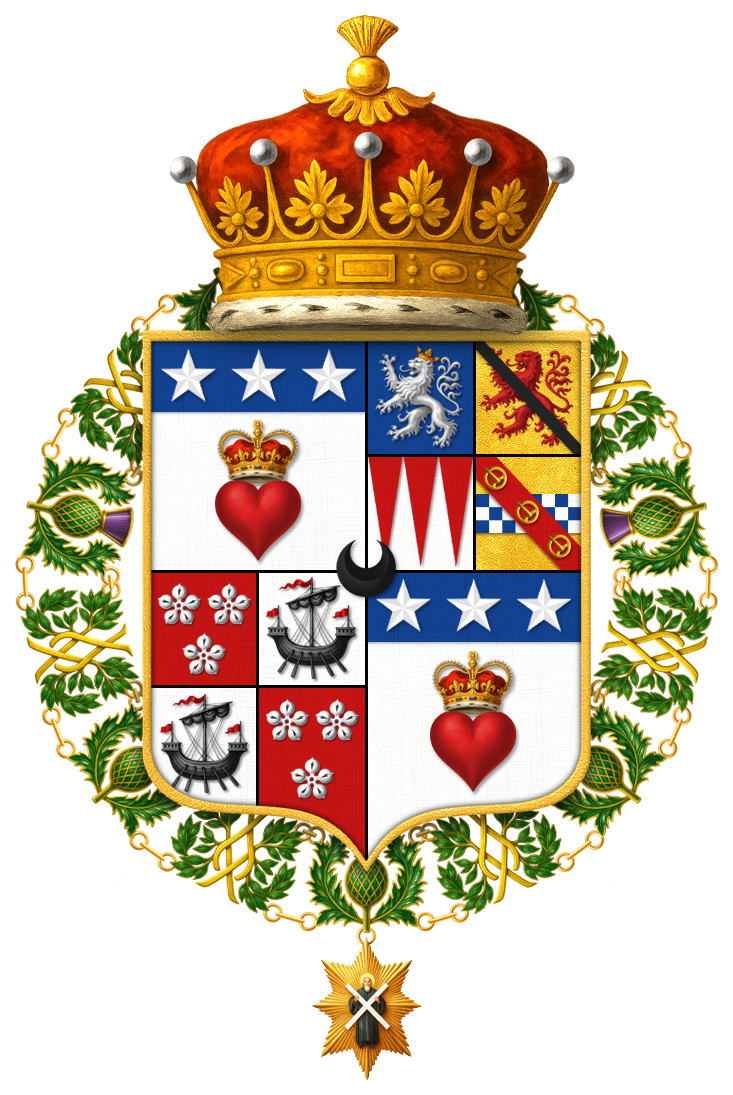
Shield of Arms of George Nigel Douglas-Hamilton, 10th Earl of Selkirk, KT, GCMG, GBE, AFC, AE, PC, QC

Group Captain George Nigel "Geordie" Douglas-Hamilton, 10th Earl of Selkirk, KT, GCMG, GBE, AFC, AE, PC, QC (4 January 1906 – 24 November 1994) was a British nobleman and Conservative politician.

== Early life ==
Born at Merly, Wimborne, Dorset, he was the second son of Nina Mary Benita, youngest daughter of Major R. Poore, Salisbury, and the 13th Duke of Hamilton and Brandon. He was educated at Eton College, Balliol College, Oxford, the University of Edinburgh (LLB) and at the University of Bonn, Vienna University and the Sorbonne. He was admitted to the Faculty of Advocates in 1935, taking silk in 1959.

He played cricket for Wiltshire in the 1927 Minor Counties Championship.

He was a member of Edinburgh Town Council from 1935 to 1940 and served as a Commissioner of General Board of Control (Scotland) from 1936 to 1939 and as a Commissioner for Special Areas in Scotland 1937–39. He commanded No. 603 (City of Edinburgh) Squadron in the Royal Auxiliary Air Force 1934–38. He was awarded the Air Force Cross in 1938.

== Second World War ==
With the outbreak of the Second World War Douglas-Hamilton joined the Royal Air Force. He served as Fighter Command's chief intelligence officer and the personal assistant to Air Chief Marshal Sir Hugh Dowding. Douglas-Hamilton was also involved in countering the German task force operating near Ceylon.

Douglas-Hamilton was twice Mentioned in Despatches and appointed an Officer of the Order of the British Empire in 1941.

On the death of his father in 1940, he succeeded as the 12th Earl of Selkirk under the terms of a special remainder of 1688, his elder brother becoming the 14th Duke of Hamilton.

== Post-war activity ==
From 1946 to 1950, Selkirk served as the president of the Cockburn Association, an influential conservationist and civic amenity body.

On 6 August 1947, he married Audrey Sale-Barker, an alpine skiing champion and prominent aviator.

In 1945 he was elected as a Scottish representative peer, giving him a seat in the House of Lords which he held until 1963. He served as a lord in waiting to King George VI (1951–1952) and to Queen Elizabeth II (1952–1953). He held ministerial office in Conservative governments, serving as paymaster general from November 1953 to December 1955, as chancellor of the Duchy of Lancaster from December 1955 to January 1957, and as first lord of the Admiralty from January 1957 to October 1959.

In 1955 Selkirk was appointed a privy counsellor, in 1959 as a knight grand cross of the Order of St Michael and St George, also in 1959 as a Queen's Counsel and in 1963 as a knight grand cross of the Order of the British Empire. In 1976 he became a knight of the Order of the Thistle, the highest Scottish honour.

He also held the office of deputy keeper of Holyroodhouse from 1937 until his death, the duke of Hamilton being hereditary keeper. He was made a freeman of Hamilton, Scotland in 1938. He was also an honorary chief of the Saulteaux Indians, 1967, and an honorary citizen of the City of Winnipeg and of the town of Selkirk, Manitoba.

== Singapore ==
From 1959 to 1963, Selkirk was High Commissioner of the United Kingdom to Singapore and Commissioner General for South-East Asia. He was also the British Representative to Southeast Asia Treaty Organization from 1960 to 1963. While in Singapore, Selkirk was also the British representative and Chairman of the Internal Security Council, a tripartite committee responsible for Singapore's internal security from 1959 to 1963.

== Later life ==
In 1957, Lord Selkirk moved into Rose Lawn Coppice, Ashington, Dorset. He had inherited the house, which had been built in 1925 by cricketer and British Army officer Brigadier General Robert Poore (1866–1938) under the will of his widow Lady Poore (1867–1957), and lived there until his own death in 1994.

== See also ==
- Douglas Douglas-Hamilton, 14th Duke of Hamilton
- Lord Malcolm Douglas-Hamilton
- Lord David Douglas-Hamilton

Political offices
Preceded by New government	Lord-in-waiting; 1951–1953	Succeeded by The Lord Hawke
Preceded by The Lord Cherwell	Paymaster General; 1953–1955	Vacant Title next held by Walter Monckton
Preceded by The Viscount Woolton	Chancellor of the Duchy of Lancaster; 1955–1957	Succeeded by Charles Hill
Preceded by Quintin Hogg	First Lord of the Admiralty; 1957–1959	Succeeded by The Lord Carrington
Peerage of Scotland
Preceded by Alfred Douglas-Hamilton	Earl of Selkirk; 1940–1994	Succeeded by James Douglas-Hamilton
