= The Cornerstone Academy =

Location
- Blandford Close; Poole, Dorset, BH15 4BQ; England; 50°42′55″N 2°00′10″W

Information
- Type: Academy
- Established: 1946
- Trust: United Learning
- Department for Education URN: 139258 Tables
- Ofsted: Reports
- Principal: Chris Phillips
- Gender: Co-educational
- Age: 11 to 16
- Enrolment: 410 as of August 2020
- Houses: Giggers, Brownsea, Pergins
- Website: https://www.cornerstoneacademy.org.uk/

The Cornerstone Academy (previously Carter Community School) is a co-educational secondary school located in Hamworthy, Poole, Dorset, England. The school serves the Hamworthy and Turlin Moor areas and pupils are taken mostly from Hamworthy and Bayside Academy Junior Schools.

== History ==
The school opened in 1946 as Herbert Carter Secondary School which was named after Alderman Herbert Carter of Carter's tiles which was based in Hamworthy. It was the first secondary school built after the Second World War in Poole, located on open fields at the southern end of the Hamworthy peninsula. The school has wide corridors and large classrooms which tell of its reserve purpose which was to act as a hospital should war break out again from paranoia of World War II and was built as a secret emergency hospital.

The school was awarded Good in an Ofsted report in January 2017.

In April 2013, the school converted to academy status as part of the United Learning group of schools.

== Overview ==
The Cornerstone Academy is a small secondary school for students aged 11 to 16 with 410 students on roll as of August 2020. Since 2004 standards have risen considerably and GCSE results continue to improve year on year with 48% of students achieving 5A* – C grades (including maths and English) in 2012. Students who attend The Cornerstone Academy currently make more progress than in any other secondary school in Poole and Bournemouth; the school is placed in the top 25% of all schools nationally (FFT -D). The school's most recent Ofsted inspection in 2017, judged the school to be ‘Good’ in all areas. The school has had extensions such as the sports hall in 2003 and full size all-weather sports pitch.
