= Broadstone railway station (Dorset) =

Former railway station in Dorset, England

Coordinates: 50.76269°N 1.99569°W

Broadstone (Dorset)
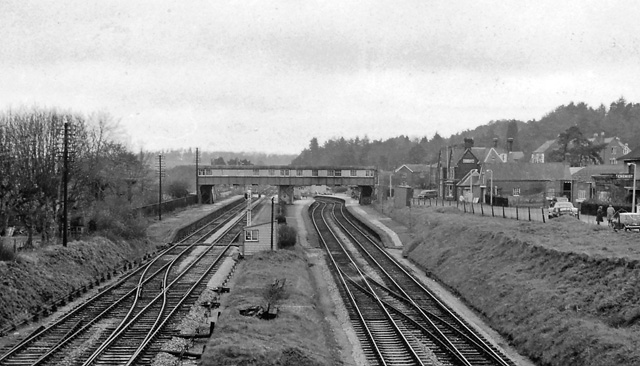
- The station in 1963

General information
- Location: Broadstone, Poole; England
- Grid reference: SZ004959
- Platforms: 4

Other information
- Status: Disused

History
- Original company: Southampton and Dorchester Railway
- Pre-grouping: London and South Western Railway
- Post-grouping: Southern Railway

Key dates
- 2 December 1872: Opened as New Poole Junction
- January 1875: Renamed Poole Junction
- July 1883: Renamed Poole Junction & Broadstone
- January 1887: Renamed Broadstone & New Poole Junction
- 15 February 1889: Renamed Broadstone Junction
- 7 July 1929: Renamed Broadstone (Dorset)
- 1956: Renamed Broadstone
- 7 March 1966: Closed
Location

Broadstone was a railway station in the northern part of the Borough of Poole in the county of Dorset in England. It opened in 1872 under the name of New Poole Junction and closed to passengers in 1966. Between these dates there were several changes of name for a station which at its height provided a suburb of Poole with four substantial platforms and a goods yard. A prominent feature of the station was the large footbridge needed to span the four running lines.

Opened as New Poole Junction in 1872, as part of the Southampton and Dorchester Railway, the station was the junction for the new line into Poole that superseded the old station at Lower Hamworthy. When the line was extended to Bournemouth West Broadstone became the junction for the trains to the Bournemouth station. Then the Somerset and Dorset Joint Railway constructed a cutoff line, running through the Corfe Mullen station and the hamlet of Ashington, in order to avoid the need to reverse in Wimborne and Broadstone became the meeting point of two lines. However, the construction of further cutoffs to improve access to Bournemouth reduced its importance.

== Decline and closure ==
The first line through Broadstone to close for passengers was the Old Road from Brockenhurst via Ringwood in 1964. The line to Hamworthy Junction was lifted in 1966. This same year, the Somerset and Dorset Joint Railway lost its passenger services. This left Broadstone the junction of two goods lines, one to serve a goods depot at Blandford Forum via a stub of the SDJR and one which passed through Wimborne to serve the RAOC fuel depot at West Moors. The Blandford Forum freight line closed and was lifted in 1969 . The goods traffic to Wimborne maintained a track running through the site until 1977 after which the track was lifted and the land sold for redevelopment.

== The site today ==
View in 2004; station site (left) had become a leisure centre; former Railway Hotel (now The Goods Yard) at right

Today the site is occupied by Broadstone Leisure Centre, its car park and a traffic roundabout. A subway to Broadstone's shopping area passes under the roads where the railway bridge used to be. This, and the building of some houses on the old trackbed north of the station site, mean that the Castleman Trailway skirts the edge of the former site before regaining the old trackbed on the way to Wimborne. The former Railway Hotel, now The Goods Yard pub, remains in business.

Preceding station	Disused railways	Following station
Creekmoor Halt; Line and station closed	Somerset and Dorset Joint Railway; Dorset Central Railway	Corfe Mullen Halt; Line and station closed
Creekmoor Halt; Line and station closed	London and South Western Railway; Southampton and Dorchester Railway	Wimborne; Line and station closed
Hamworthy Junction; Line closed, station open	London and South Western Railway; Southampton and Dorchester Railway	Wimborne; Line and station closed
