= Wimborne Minster Town Hall =

Municipal building in Wimborne Minster, Dorset, England

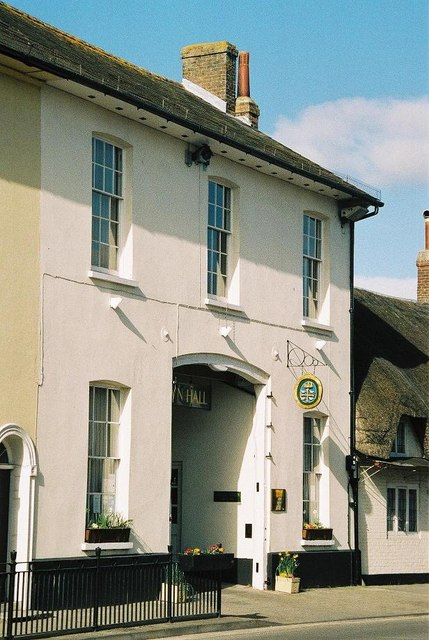
- The building in 2004

- Shown in Dorset
- 50.8018°N 1.9891°W
- Location: West Borough, Wimborne Minster

History
- Built: 1830

Site notes
- Architectural style: Neoclassical style

Listed Building – Grade II
- Official name: 37, West Borough
- Designated: 13 June 1952
- Reference no.: 1323802

Wimborne Minster Town Hall is a municipal building in West Borough in Wimborne Minster, a town in Dorset, in England. The building, which currently accommodates the offices and meeting place of Wimborne Minster Town Council, is a Grade II listed building.

== History ==
=== The civic centre ===
Following significant population growth, largely due to its status as a market town, a local board was established in Wimborne Minster in 1892. After the local board was succeeded by an urban district council in 1894, the new council established offices at Allendale House in Hanham Road. The house was commissioned by the steward to the Hanham Estate, William Castleman. It was designed by Sir Jeffry Wyatville in the neoclassical style, built in brick with a cement render and was completed in 1823. The house became a girls' school in 1860 and later adopted the name Wimborne High School for Girls. It was acquired by Wimborne Urban District Council in the late 1930s and converted into a civic centre. It remained the headquarters of the council for another three decades, but ceased to be the local seat of government when the enlarged East Dorset Council was formed at Furzehill, 1.6 miles (2.6 km) north of Wimborne Minster, in 1974.

=== The town hall ===
The building was probably commissioned as a public hall. It was designed in the neoclassical style, built in brick with a cement render and was completed in about 1830. A terrace of three houses was built later in the decade, adjoining and immediately to the south, in a similar style. Following local government re-organisation in 1974, No. 37 West Borough was acquired by the town council and converted into the town hall. On the first floor is the council chamber, capable of seating up to 48 people. The playwright, Sir Tom Stoppard, married the heiress Sabrina Guiness, in the town hall in June 2014.

== Architecture of the town hall ==
The building is constructed of brick with a cement render, which has been colour washed, and a slate roof. It is two storeys high, but rises to the same height as the neighbouring three-storey terrace. The ground floor incorporates a large central archway with an archivolt, which provides access to the rear of the property. It is fenestrated by sash windows with window sills on both floors. Internally, the principal room is the council chamber, which has an original plaster ceiling including a moulded cornice and ornamental ceiling roses. The building was grade II listed in 1952.
