= Poole Power Station =

Former power station in England

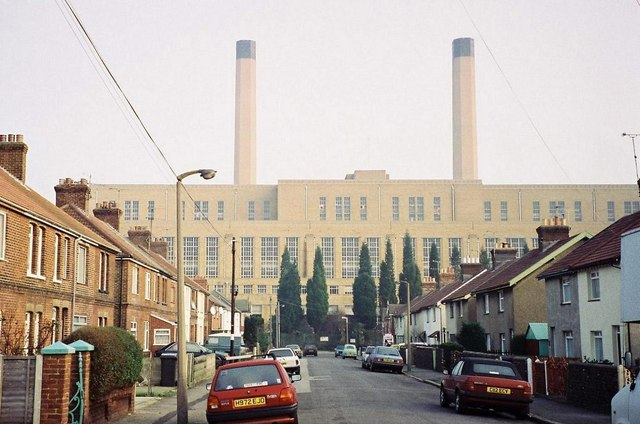
- Poole Power Station, days before the demolition of the chimneys
- Country: England
- Location: Dorset, South West England
- Coordinates: 50.715564°N 1.996153°W
- Status: Decommissioned and demolished. Brownfield site.
- Construction began: 1946
- Commission date: 1950
- Decommission date: 1993
- Owners: British Electricity Authority (1948–1955); Central Electricity Authority (1955–1957); Central Electricity Generating Board (1958–1994)
- Operator: As owner
- Employees: 400

Thermal power station
- Primary fuel: Coal
- Chimneys: 2 (100 m)
- Cooling towers: None
- Cooling source: Seawater

Power generation
- Units operational: 2 × 60 MW, 2 × 55 MW, 2 × 52.5 MW
- Units decommissioned: All
- Nameplate capacity: 305 MW

External links
- Commons: Related media on Commons

Poole Power Station was a coal-fired power station located in Hamworthy, Poole, in Dorset. Its 325 ft (100 m) tall twin chimneys were prominent landmarks and it was the tallest building in Dorset until its partial demolition in 1993.

== History ==
The station was authorised in 1946 and constructed between 1946 and 1950, built out of local brick. Before construction could begin, 250,000 tonnes of chalk was imported from a quarry in Sturminster Marshall to reclaim 30 acres of land. On this was laid a mass concrete raft 500ft by 248ft to form a foundation for the transformer bay, turbine house and boiler-house which at the time was the largest concrete raft ever formed. To build the power station, millions of three colour bricks were made by Skykes and Sons of Creekmoor and The Upton Brick Works. Construction of the station required the driving of 30–40 ft piles for the two 325 ft (100m) tall chimneys that were the most noticeable features. Coal was delivered by sea using dedicated fleet of colliers and transferred by cranes (200 Tonnes/hr) and conveyors to the station.An oil fired burner was installed in 1955. In its heyday, the station employed over 400 people.

The station had two Metropolitan Vickers 52.5 MW, two CA Parsons 52.5 MW, and two GEC 60 MW turbo-alternators. The first generating set was commissioned in December 1950, followed by further sets in July 1951, December 1951, June 1952, April 1958 and December 1958.

There were nine International Combustion Limited pulverised fuel superheating boilers each evaporating 340,000 pounds per hour of steam at 950 psi and 940 °F (42.84 kg/s, 65.5 bar and 504 °C).

The operating capacity and electricity output of the station was:

Poole generating capacity and electricity output
| Year | Capacity MW | Output GWh |
|---|---|---|
| 1955 | 188 | 1072.58 |
| 1956 | 200 | 1334.60 |
| 1957 | 200 | 1388.50 |
| 1958 | 200 | 1237.86 |
| 1959 | 200 | 779.01 |
| 1961 | 335 | 1266.5 |
| 1962 | 335 | 1244.3 |
| 1963 | 335 | 1548.0 |
| 1967 | 325 | 1565.6 |
| 1972 | 325 | 1690.56 |
| 1979 | 320 | 57.36 |
| 1981 | 320 | 0.09 |
| 1982 | 320 | 0.45 |

== Demolition ==
On 2 February 1993 the 325 ft chimneys of the power station were demolished in front of an audience of approximately 7,000 people. In December 1993, eight coal bunkers, containing 1,600 tonnes of steel were demolished. The main building, which contained over 14,000 tonnes of steel, remained until March 1994.

In 1971–2 the station had two 62.5 MW, two 55 MW and two 52.5 MW generating sets, giving an output capability of 341.7 MW. In that year the station delivered 1,690.558 GWh of electricity.

During the 1970s some of the plant was decommissioned. In 1980 the station had two 60 MW turbo-alternators, and had a net declared output capability of 305 MW. The steam capacity of the boilers was 387.0 kg/s delivering steam to the turbines at 62.1 bar and 496 °C. In the year ending 31 March 1981 the station delivered just 88 MWh of electricity.

== The site today ==
Today, the site is a major brownfield location and pylons still exist there. The access road to the Twin Sails Bridge cuts through the site.
