= Creekmoor Halt railway station =

Disused railway station in Dorset, England

Coordinates: 50.74650°N 1.99995°W

Creekmoor Halt
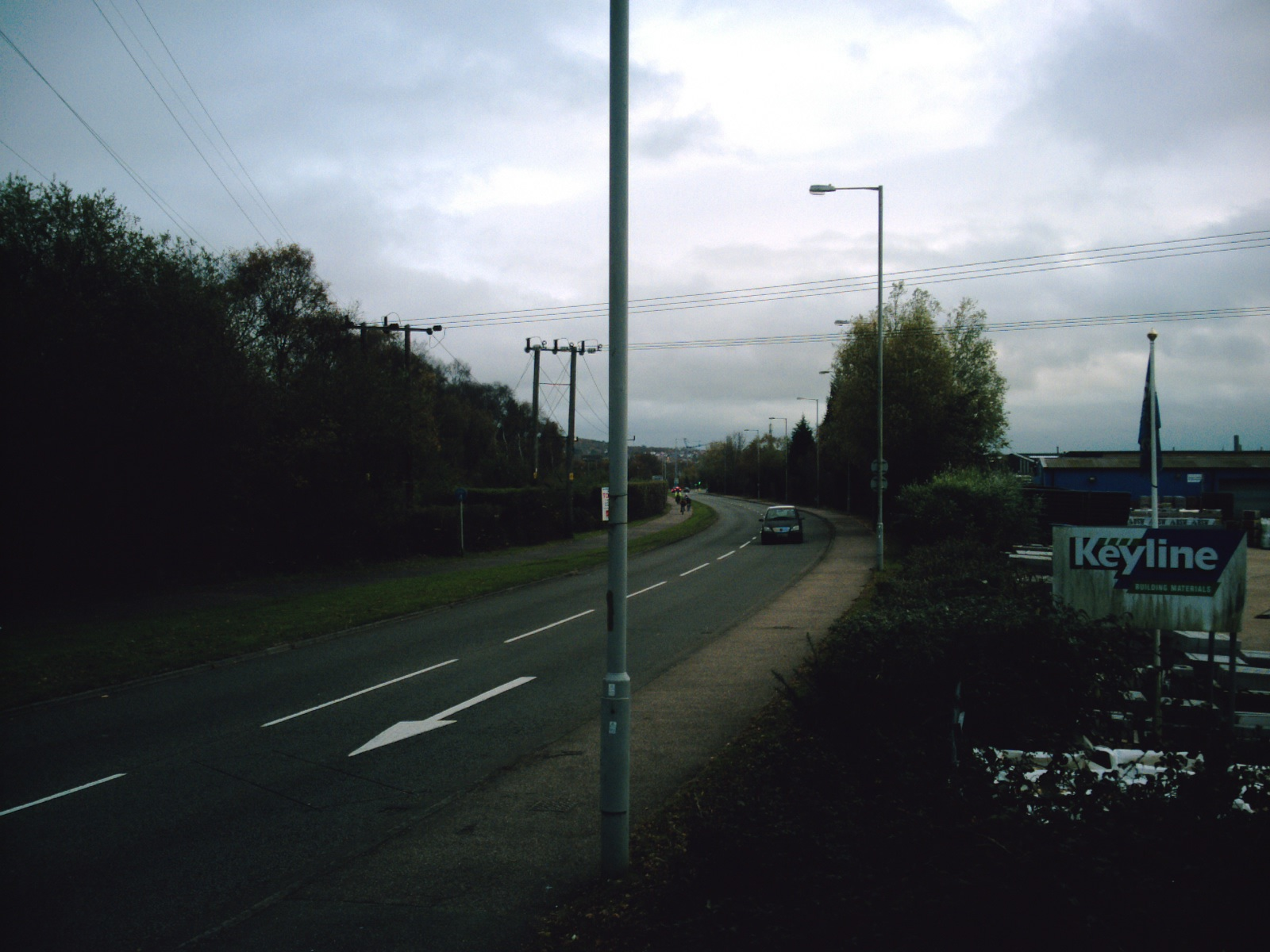
- The site of Creekmoor Halt in November 2008. The electricity cables confirm the location from this picture.

General information
- Location: Creekmoor, Poole; England
- Grid reference: SZ001941
- Platforms: 2

Other information
- Status: Disused

History
- Post-grouping: SR; Southern Region of British Railways

Key dates
- 19 June 1933: Opened
- 7 March 1966: Closed
Location

Creekmoor was a halt on the former Southampton and Dorchester Railway opened by the Southern Railway for workers at the adjacent "Oerlikon" munitions factory, later run by Plesseys, now owned by Siemens. The halt was situated ¾ mile south of Broadstone, 1½ miles from Poole town centre and 116 miles 79 chains from London Waterloo. The original line had been opened on 2 December 1872 by the L&SWR, and had closed completely by 2 May 1977; the halt itself opened on 19 June 1933 and closed on 7 March 1966.

== Construction ==
Consisting of two platforms prefabricated in concrete at the railway's own concrete works near Exmouth Junction, the station inherited a pre-cast concrete footbridge from somewhere else. A glazed waiting shelter was situated on each platform, as were enamel running in boards and several totems. One such totem reached £890 in auction in 2007, and a corroded running in board has also been very highly valued. Two window frames, totems and the nearby wooden, crossing keepers' box was preserved by the Creekmoor Light Railway in 1969 at their narrow gauge line 200 yards down the nearby lane. To the front of the down platform (from Bournemouth West) lay a siding serving Sykes Pottery. The ground frame was taken out of use in June 1969 and the track was removed on 18 October 1970. A siding on the other line served the Ministry of Supply's Munitions Factory from 13 September 1940 until the facility was taken out of use in July 1959.

== The site today ==
The site today lies under the route of the A349 Broadstone Way. The construction of this road means there is now no sign that the halt ever existed.

Preceding station	Disused railways	Following station
Poole; Line closed, station open	Somerset & Dorset Joint Railway; Dorset Central Railway	Broadstone; Line and station closed
Poole; Line closed, station open	London and South Western Railway; Southampton and Dorchester Railway	Broadstone; Line and station closed

== See also ==
- List of closed railway stations in Britain
