= Robert Poore =

Anglo-Irish cricketer and British Army officer (1866–1938)

Brigadier-General Robert Poore CIE DSO DL JP
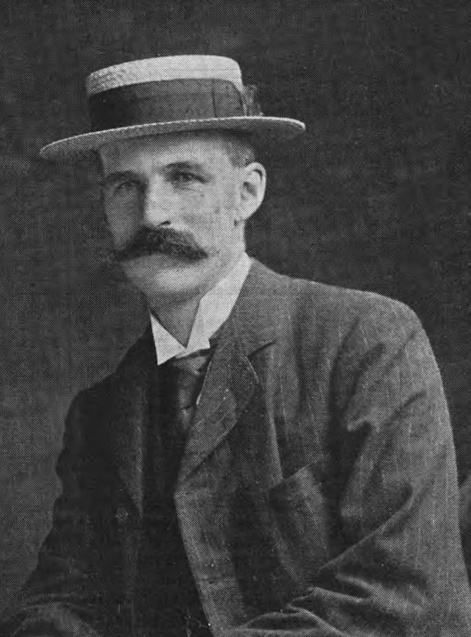
- Poore in 1899
- Born: 20 March 1866; Dublin, Ireland
- Died: 14 July 1938 (aged 72); Boscombe, Hampshire, England
- Burial place: Ashington, Dorset; 50.7769°N 1.9883°W
- Military career
- Allegiance: United Kingdom
- Branch: British Army; British Indian Army
- Service years: 1883–1921
- Rank: Brigadier-General
- Commands: Provost marshal (South Africa); 7th Hussars; Jhansi Brigade
- Conflicts: Second Matabele War; Second Boer War; First World War
- Awards: Companion of the Order of the Indian Empire; Distinguished Service Order; Mentioned in Despatches
- Cricket career

Personal information
- Height: 6 ft 4 in (1.93 m)
- Batting: Right-handed
- Bowling: Unknown

International information
- National side: South Africa (1895/96)
- Test debut (cap 28): 13 February 1896 v England
- Last Test: 21 March 1896 v England

Domestic team information
- Years: Team
- 1892/93–1913/14: Europeans
- 1892/93: Bombay
- 1898–1906: Hampshire
- 1898: Marylebone Cricket Club

Career statistics
Competition	Test	First-class
Matches	3	55
Runs scored	76	3,441
Batting average	12.66	38.66
100s/50s	–/–	11/12
Top score	20	304
Balls bowled	9	470
Wickets	1	13
Bowling average	4.00	19.38
5 wickets in innings	–	–
10 wickets in match	–	–
Best bowling	1/4	2/10
Catches/stumpings	3/–	38/–
- Source: Cricinfo, 13 November 2022

Brigadier-General Robert Montagu Poore, CIE, DSO, DL, JP (20 March 1866 – 14 July 1938) was an Anglo-Irish British Army officer and cricketer who, while serving in the British Transvaal Colony in 1896, played in three Test matches for the South African cricket team. He featured most prominently in first-class cricket playing county cricket in England for Hampshire between 1898 and 1906, where he gained a reputation as a batsman, having notable success in 1899 when he was the highest first-class run-scorer in England. Alongside playing for Hampshire, Poore also played first-class cricket in India for the Europeans in the Bombay Presidency Matches. An all-round sportsman, he was also a capable swordsman, and polo, tennis, racquets, and squash player, in addition to being a skilled marksman. Poore had success in the Royal Naval and Military Tournaments, being adjudged the best man-at-arms on four occasions.

Poore began his military service in the Militia with the 3rd (Royal Wiltshire Militia) Battalion of the Wiltshire Regiment in 1883, before gaining a regular commission in the British Army in 1886. From there, he transferred to the 7th Hussars in the same year and shortly after served in British India, where he was aide-de-camp to the Governor of Bombay. Poore served in the Second Matabele War in Southern Africa and later in the Second Boer War from 1899 to 1902, during which he was seconded to the Mounted Military Police and served as provost marshal at Army Headquarters Pretoria. In this role, he played an important part in investigating and recording the war–crimes trial and execution of Breaker Morant and Peter Handcock. Decorated with the Distinguished Service Order during the war, Poore later returned to the Hussars and served in the First World War between 1914 and 1918, commanding the Jhansi Brigade of the British Indian Army from 1915, for which he was made a Companion of the Order of the Indian Empire in 1918. He retired from active military service in 1921. In later life, he was a deputy lieutenant for Dorset.

== Military career ==
The son of Major Robert Poore Senior and his wife, Juliana née Lowry-Corry (daughter of Rear-admiral Armar Lowry-Corry), Poore was born at Dublin in March 1866. He was initially home educated, before attending Cheam School in England. His father wished for him to enter the British Army, but he consistently failed the entry exams for Sandhurst. Poore joined the Militia as a lieutenant with the 3rd (Royal Wiltshire Militia) Battalion of the Wiltshire Regiment in August 1883, before joining the 1st Battalion with a regular commission in the British Army in April 1886, having finally managed to pass the entry exams. In the same year, through the influence of his father, he obtained a transfer to the 7th Hussars. He served in British India until 1895, where he was aide-de-camp to the Governor of Bombay, Lord Harris, from 1892. While stationed in India, he saw no active combat. From India, he proceeded with the 7th Hussars to South Africa, where he served in the Second Matabele War in neighbouring Rhodesia from 1896 to 1897. He was promoted to captain during that conflict, before being promoted to brevet major in May 1898.

After a brief period in the United States procuring remounts for the army, Poore served in the Second Boer War in South Africa, being seconded for service with the Mounted Military Police in October 1899. He was appointed provost marshal at Army Headquarters Pretoria in November 1899. In this capacity, Poore commanded the military police and was responsible to the commander-in-chief, Lord Roberts, and his successor in 1902, Earl Kitchener. He was mentioned in despatches in March 1900, with Roberts praising Poore for his "care of prisoners" and conduct in "maintaining order in camp and on the line of march". He saw action in the Orange Free State, where he took part in the battles of Paardeberg, Poplar Grove, Driefontein, Vet River, and Zand River; he subsequently saw action in the Transvaal, where he took part in engagements at Pretoria and Diamond Hill, and later in August 1900 in Western Transvaal at Bergendal. He received the Distinguished Service Order in April 1901, in recognition of his war service. In February 1901, he was tasked by Kitchener with forming a Boer commando, the Bushveldt Mounted Rifles. This was made up of surrendered Boer combatants, whose task it was to loot cattle from enemy forces.

In August 1901, he gained the full rank of major, and was granted the local rank of lieutenant colonel in November 1901. As provost marshal, Poore was the lead investigator into the war–crimes allegations against Breaker Morant and Peter Handcock, which led to their trial and execution in February 1902. He published a diary, containing contemporary notes on the case. In the diary he puts forth his belief that Morant and Handcock not only executed prisoners of war, but also murdered a German missionary who witnessed the killings. Poore was critical of Kitchener in the diary, considering him "weak-kneed" and not tough enough in suppressing the rebellious Boers. He was subsequently responsible for drilling the firing squad which was to carry out the executions, and ensuring that the execution order was carried out. He returned home aboard the SS Canada in July 1902 but would return to South Africa on military service in 1903 until his final departure in 1905.

Having returned to the 7th Hussars, he was promoted to lieutenant colonel in June 1911, before returning to India as commanding officer of the 7th Hussars. During the First World War, he was promoted to colonel in June 1915, and in August 1915 he was appointed commander of the Jhansi Brigade in the British Indian Army, an appointment he retained for the remainder of the war. He remained in India throughout the war and did not see combat. Poore was appointed a Companion of the Order of the Indian Empire in the 1918 Birthday Honours. He relinquished his command of the Jhansi Brigade in October 1919, nearly a year after the end of the war, and was subsequently placed on the half-pay list. Poore retired from active service in March 1921 and was granted the honorary rank of brigadier-general.

== Cricket career ==
=== India and South Africa ===
Poore was not initially overly enamoured with cricket. He learnt the game through the perusal of textbooks, reputedly chiefly from the Badminton Volume of Cricket (1888), as opposed to the classical coaching method; his arrival in India as a subaltern with the 7th Hussars made him realise his love for the game. Styling his game on that of W. G. Grace, he subsequently made his debut in first-class cricket for the Europeans cricket team against the Parsees in August 1892 in the 1892–93 Bombay Presidency Match, and he played a second match against the same opponents the following month. In December of the same year, he played for Bombay against Lord Hawke's touring team. He subsequently made four further first-class appearances for the Europeans across the 1894–95 and 1895–96 Bombay Presidency Matches, which included a maiden century in the latter. He was prolific while playing for Government House in minor matches, averaging 80 for the team.

Poore continued his prolific form when he went to South Africa, scoring over 1,600 runs over the period of a few months. Among these were nine centuries, with Poore being the only batsman in South Africa to score centuries against Lord Hawke's touring team. His form led to him being called up to the South African team, with him featuring in three matches against England in February–March 1896; these were subsequently afforded retrospective Test status. In his three Test appearances, he scored 76 runs at an average of 12.66, and took a single wicket. Wisden noted that he did not distinguish himself in what were heavy defeats for South Africa. Following the Test, there was talk of Poore playing for Natal in the 1895–96 Currie Cup, but the competition was called off due to unrest. His time spent playing on hard wickets in India and South Africa early in his career is credited with developing and refining his batting style.

=== Hampshire and later cricket ===
Poore returned to England on leave in 1898, playing in a first-class match for the Marylebone Cricket Club (MCC) against Lancashire at Lord's in May, in which he scored a half-century which helped the MCC to an innings victory. Just over one week later, he made his debut in county cricket for Hampshire against Somerset at Bath in the 1898 County Championship, at the age of 32. He made twelve appearances for Hampshire in 1898, alongside an additional two appearances for the MCC. In his first full season of first-class cricket in England, he scored 735 runs at an average of 28.26, making two centuries.

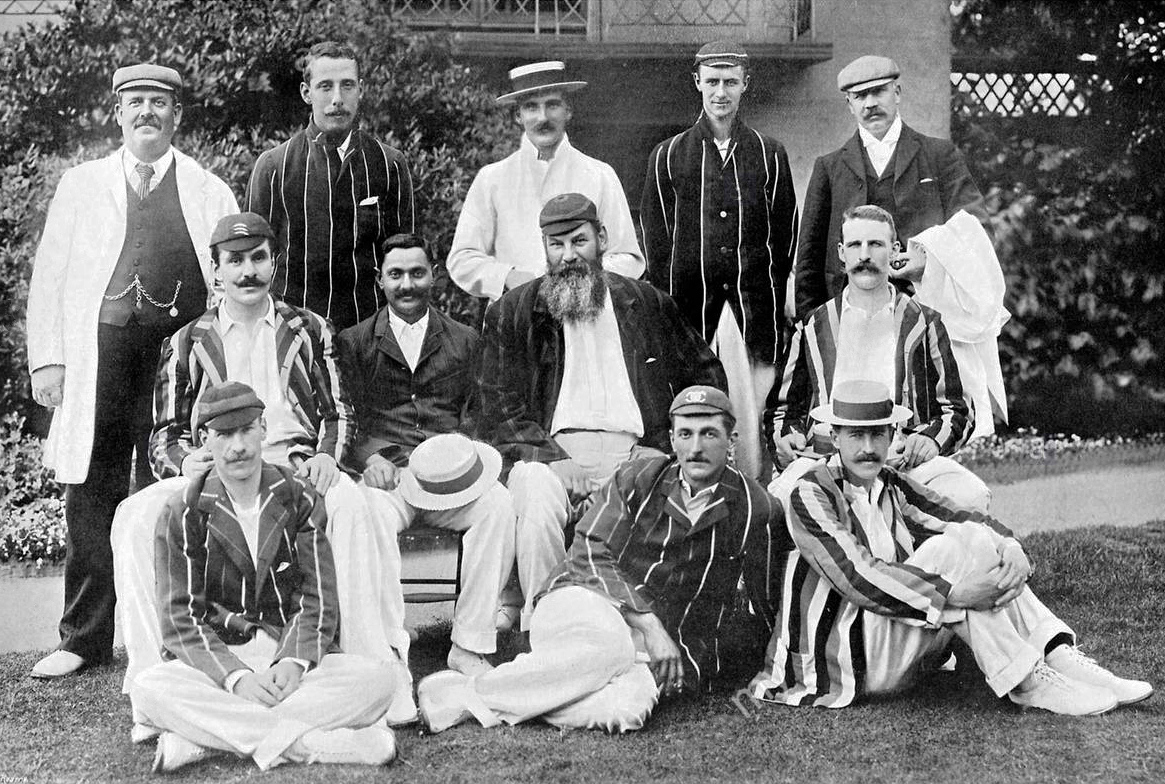
The Gentlemen team of 1899; Poore is seated on the far-right of the middle row.

The following season, Poore was the highest first-class run-scorer in England, scoring 1,399 runs (including seven hundreds) between 12 June and 12 August at an average of 116.58. Against Somerset, he made 304, which was the highest individual first-class score for Hampshire until it was surpassed by Dick Moore's 316 in 1937. While compiling his score, he shared in a partnership of 411 for the sixth wicket with fellow army officer Captain Wynyard (225) – as of 2026 this remains a Hampshire record for the sixth wicket. Poore's innings was described by the Southern Daily Echo as being "a remarkable feat of physical endurance" on "a sweltering July day". In 21 innings over the course of the entire season, Poore scored 1,551 runs at 91.23, a record average for an English season not broken until Don Bradman averaged 98.66 in 1930, and not surpassed by an English batsman until Herbert Sutcliffe averaged 96.96 in 1931. His form led to him being selected for the Gentlemen in the two Gentlemen v Players fixtures played that season at Lord's and The Oval, but his scores in these disappointed. Had Poore met with success in these, he would likely have played Test cricket for England in the latter half of their series against Australia, but no Test cap for England was forthcoming. In recognition of his success in 1899, Poore was selected as a Wisden Cricketer of the Year for 1900. He was the only Irish-born player afforded this distinction until Eoin Morgan in 2011.

Poore returned to South Africa after the 1899 season to fight in the Second Boer War. After he returned to England, a broken arm caused him to miss most of the 1902 season, but on his return match against the touring Australians, he made an unbeaten 62 against the bowling of Hugh Trumble, who was aided by a sticky wicket. He played two matches in the 1902 County Championship, in addition to playing for The Rest against a combined Kent and Sussex team at Hastings. Early in the 1903 season, he was presented with a silver bowl at the County Ground in recognition of his 1899 season. It was hoped he would be available to play again in 1903, but he returned to South Africa that summer. When he returned to Hampshire in the middle of 1904 to great expectations, his form was disappointing. In the nine matches he played for Hampshire in the County Championship, he scored 272 runs at an average of 18.13. After missing the 1905 season due to his military commitments in South Africa, Poore played in two matches in the 1906 County Championship, scoring a century (129) against Sussex at Chichester. However, an injury to his leg ended his season and, as it turned out, his county career. For Hampshire, he made 36 first-class appearances, in which he scored 2,819 runs at an average of 47.77, with ten centuries.

Four years after his previous first-class appearance, Poore captained a combined Army and Navy team against a combined Oxford and Cambridge Universities team at Aldershot, which the Army and Navy won by 6 wickets. Later, while serving in India in 1912 and 1913, he made two final appearances in first-class cricket for the Europeans, with Poore scoring a half-century in the 1912 fixture against the Parsees. Described by Wisden as possessing one of the most powerful cover drives at the time, it was said that, with his height of 6 feet 4 inches (1.93 m) and massive frame, when he struck a cover drive it would race over the turf with such speed that a fieldsman, no matter how placed, could not stop it. It was also noted that once he became accustomed to English wickets, he developed a strong defensive game. In 55 first-class matches, he scored 3,441 runs at an average of 38.66. His great height, while benefitting his batting, was noted to be a hindrance to him when fielding, with Poore sometimes finding it difficult to get down to the ball. After the cessation of his first-class career, Poore remained a dangerous batsman in club games right up to his mid-fifties, scoring three consecutive fifties during an MCC tour of the West Country in 1923. Up until his final years, he ran a cricket school in Bournemouth.

== Other sports ==
Cricket was not the only field in which Poore's sporting talents lay: he was considered a skilled swordsman, and polo, tennis, racquets, and squash player, in addition to being a capable marksman. As a swordsman, Poore was adjudged to have been the best man-at-arms in the 1898, 1899, 1906, and 1907 Royal Naval and Military Tournaments; his success was attributed to the enormous reach of his arms which had suited him so well as a cricketer. He had success as a polo player for the 7th Hussars, winning the Inter-Regimental Tournament in India in 1891 and 1895, and in England in 1899 at The Hurlingham Club, where he made the winning hit in the final of the Inter-Regimental Tournament. As a tennis player, he was runner-up to Captain C. S. Smith in the 1894 West of India Lawn Tennis Championship, and won the Matabeleland Tennis Championship at the Queens Sports Club while stationed in Rhodesia in April 1897. He also won several racquets and squash tournaments, including the Norfolk Squash Racquets Championship in 1906. In later life he took up golf, captaining the Broadstone Golf Club and playing for the England Senior Golfers Society against Scotland in 1936. His all-round sporting prowess led Murray and Vahed (2009) to suggest that he was one of the greatest all-round sportsmen of the 19th century.

== Family and personal life ==
In 1898, Poore married Lady Flora Mary Ida Douglas-Hamilton, daughter of Captain Charles Douglas-Hamilton, and sister of the 13th Duke of Hamilton. The couple had no children. Three years after their marriage, Poore's sister Nina Mary Benita Poore married the 13th duke, and became Duchess of Hamilton. In 1925, Poore constructed a house on land purchased from Lord Wimborne's estate, Rose Lawn Coppice, in Ashington, Dorset. He became a deputy lieutenant for Dorset in June 1932, and was also a justice of the peace within the county from 1933. Poore died at a nursing home in Boscombe on 14 July 1938, having been ill since November of the previous year. He was subsequently buried in the garden of his Rose Lawn Coppice residence.

Following his death, the Hampshire Advertiser described him as "one of Hampshire's most famous amateur cricketers". A year after his death, a memorial to him was erected at Salisbury Cathedral. Writing in an introduction to A. A. Thomson's Odd Men In: A Gallery Of Cricket Eccentrics (1985), Leo Cooper, referencing the unusual manner in which Poore took up cricket, wrote of him: "Of all the people in the history of the game [cricket], he seems to stand for the Eccentric Ideal."

== Works cited ==
- Humphris, Edith M.; Creagh, Sir O'Moore (1924). The V. C. and D. S. O. Vol. 2. London: Standard Art Book Company Limited. OCLC 749126130.
- Lonsdale, Jeremy (1984). "Robert Poore and the English 6th wkt Record". The Cricket Statistician. 47. Nottingham: ACS.
- Lonsdale, Jeremy (1988). "Robert Montagu Poore". The Cricket Statistician. 64. Nottingham: ACS.
- Murray, Bruce; Vahed, Goolam (2009). Empire & Cricket: The South African Experience 1884–1914 (1 ed.). Pretoria: UNISA Press. ISBN 9781868885404.
- Stern, John; Williams, Marcus (2014). The Essential Wisden. London: Bloomsbury Publishing. ISBN 9781408178966.
- Thomson, A. A. (1985). "Leo Cooper". Odd Men In: A Gallery of Cricket Eccentrics. London: The Pavilion Library. ISBN 9780907516736 – via Internet Archive.
- Warner, Sir Pelham, ed. (23 July 1938). "Obituary: Brig.-General R. M. Poore". The Cricketer. Vol. 19, no. 13. London.
- West, Joe; Roper, Roger (2016). Breaker Morant: The Final Roundup. Stroud: Amberley Publishing. ISBN 9781445659664.
