= Bailey Gate railway station =

Disused railway station in East Dorset, England

Coordinates: 50.79504°N 2.07373°W

Bailey Gate
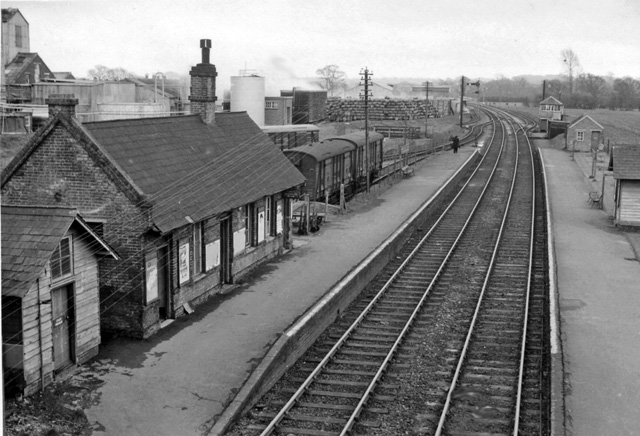
- Bailey Gate railway station in April 1963

General information
- Location: Sturminster Marshall, Dorset; England
- Grid reference: SY949995
- Platforms: 2

Other information
- Status: Disused

History
- Original company: Dorset Central Railway
- Pre-grouping: Somerset and Dorset Joint Railway
- Post-grouping: Somerset and Dorset Joint Railway; Southern Region of British Railways

Key dates
- 1 November 1860: Opened (Sturminster Marshall)
- 31 August 1863: Renamed (Bailey Gate)
- 7 March 1966: Closed
Location

Bailey Gate railway station was on the Somerset & Dorset Joint Railway in the English county of Dorset. It was in use from 1860 until 1966.

== History ==
The station was opened as Sturminster Marshall railway station on 1 November 1860 by the Dorset Central Railway, which later became part of the Somerset & Dorset Joint Railway. It served the village of Sturminster Marshall but was renamed Bailey Gate from 1 November 1863 to avoid confusion with another station on the same railway at Sturminster Newton, which had opened on 10 September 1863.

An avoiding line for Wimbourne opened from a junction at Bailey Gate on 14 December 1885. This shortened the journey from Bath to Bournemouth.

General goods traffic ceased from 5 April 1965 and the station closed, along with the rest of the line, on 7 March 1966. Track was finally lifted on 21 June 1970 and the site redeveloped as an industrial estate.

== Description ==
The station consisted of three buildings. The main building was on the down platform and included a ticket office and waiting room.. There was a small wooden shelter on the up platform and a signal box. Access to the station from the west was via a small path that ran down from the slope of the bridge, which took the user to the up platform where, to gain access to the station buildings, one had to cross the railway lines via a small wooden crossing next to the bridge. Access from the east was via the main entrance to the goods sidings down the slope and around the side of the station via a gateway.

== Goods traffic ==
The station served the United Dairies milk processing factory and this traffic continued after the closure to general goods traffic in 1965

Preceding station	Disused railways	Following station
Corfe Mullen	Somerset & Dorset Joint Railway	Spetisbury
Wimborne	Somerset & Dorset Joint Railway	Spetisbury
