= Wimborne Market =

Historic market in Dorset, England

Coordinates: 50.795445°N 1.9763750°W

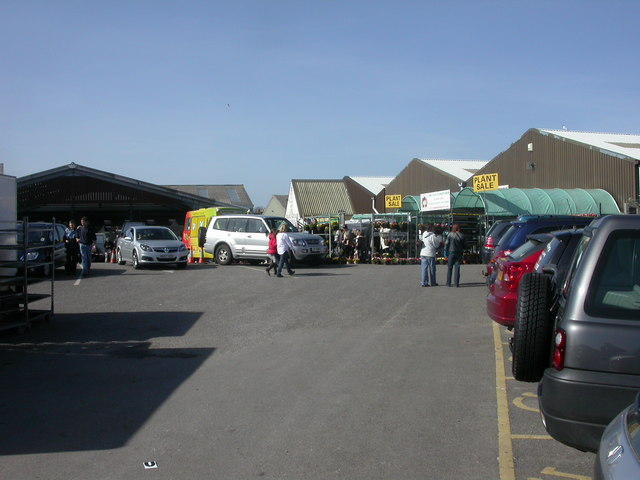
Wimborne Market in 2009

Wimborne Market was an historic market in a large covered structure in Wimborne Minster, Dorset, England. It relocated to the Allendale Community Centre in 2022 following the closure of the original site.. The original market was demolished and the land redeveloped.

== Origins ==
The market was established in 1855 by Thomas Ensor, who had established a livestock market in Dorchester. Ensor acquired fields next to the new railway station at Wimborne (which opened in 1847) for a livestock market on Tuesdays. The market was suspended during WWII, but livestock trading recommenced in 1955. That trade came to an end in 1972. A produce auction continued until 1975. Meanwhile a stall market was established on Fridays in 1970. From 1972 a bric-a-brac market was started in a building that had previously been used to sell pigs. A car boot market was established in 1982, and a Sunday market in 1984. An antiques market was established in 2013.

== Later location ==
From 1990 the market was located under cover at Riverside Park, Station Road, Wimborne Minster. This was the goods yard to the former railway station, which had closed to traffic in 1977. Trading days were Fridays, Saturdays and Sundays from early morning until 2 pm. Market traders sold fresh food, vintage and antique items, and household essentials.

There were subsidiary markets at Dorchester and Swanage and a car boot sale at Lake Gates. A farmers' market was held on the 3rd Saturday of each month.

== Proposed relocation ==
In 2020, it was announced that, due to high business rates and changing shopping patterns, the market would move from its then current location later that year to Lake Gates. Lake Gates is the site of a Roman fortress, and is the location of weekly car boot sales, also run by the George family, who acquired the market from the Ensors in the 1970s. Lake Gates is also known as The Wimborne Showground, and is located just of the A31 just outside the market town of Wimborne.

In 2021, the owners of the existing market site announced that it had been sold for retirement housing to McCarthy & Stone. Wimborne Town Council are considering (2020) establishing a weekly street market in Wimborne once the market relocates to Lake Gates. In 2022 the market moved to the Allendale Community Centre where it continues to operate every Friday. As at February 2022, the market has not yet relocated to Lake Gates.
