= Turlin Moor =

Suburb of Poole, in Dorset, England

Coordinates: 50°43′28″N 2°1′32″W

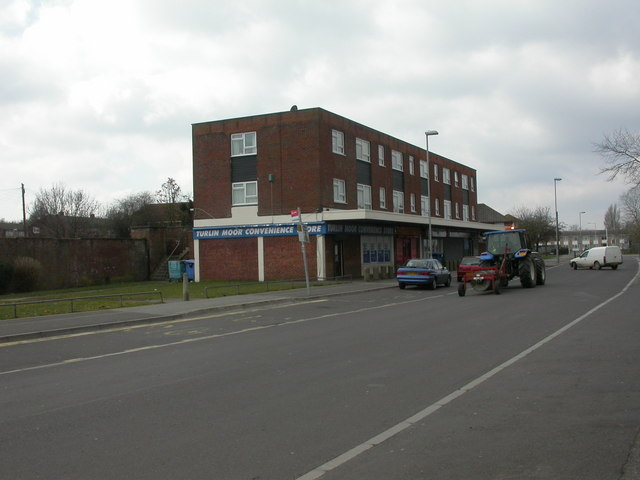
Shops at Turlin Moor

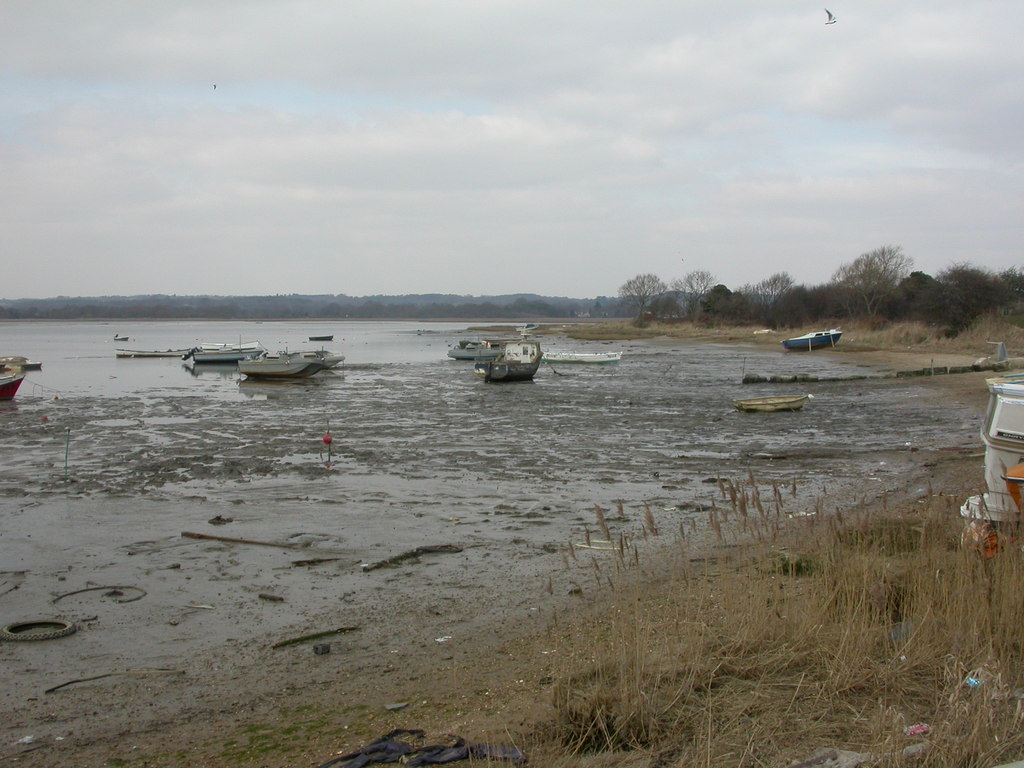
Coast of Turlin Moor at low tide

Turlin Moor is a suburb of Poole in Dorset, England, located between Hamworthy and Upton.

Turlin Moor is host to Hamworthy railway station. The two railway bridges at the end of the estate on Blandford Road form the meeting point between Hamworthy, Turlin Moor and Upton Park. It is on the Hamworthy spit which is linked to Poole via Upton Bypass, and the two Poole bridges. It has the South West Main Line on its south side and Lytchett Bay to the north.

Turlin Moor is home to Poole Borough Football Club and Poole Rugby Club.

Turlin Moor Scout Group was an active Scout group in the Poole area, until its demise in the 1980s when it was closed and its members absorbed into 1st Hamworthy Scout Group, which is still running today with some of its sections being called 'Hamworthy - Turlin Moor'.

Turlin Moor is part of Hamworthy electoral ward for elections to Bournemouth, Christchurch and Poole Council. It is the most deprived area of the town.
