= Wimborne railway station =

Disused railway station in Dorset, England

Coordinates: 50.7945°N 1.9761°W

Wimborne

General information
- Location: Wimborne, Dorset; England
- Grid reference: SZ018995
- Platforms: 2 (through), 2 (bays) at maximum

Other information
- Status: Closed and completely demolished.

History
- Pre-grouping: Southampton and Dorchester Railway; London and South Western Railway
- Post-grouping: Southern Railway; Southern Region of British Railways

Key dates
- 1 June 1847: Opened
- 4 May 1964: Closed to passengers
- 2 May 1977: Closed to freight
Location

Wimborne was a railway station in Wimborne Minster in the county of Dorset in England. Open from 1 June 1847 to 2 May 1977, it was sited just north of the River Stour in what is still Station Road. Built for the Southampton and Dorchester Railway, the station was operated from the start by the London and South Western Railway, which took over ownership in 1848. It was later operated by the Southern Railway from 1923 to 1947 and, from 1948, by the Southern Region of British Railways, which traded as British Rail from 1965.

== Heyday ==
From the early 1860s until the mid-1880s, the station was significant in its own right on the Southampton and Dorchester Railway, as well as the point of interchange for other lines. What in 1875-76 became the Somerset and Dorset Joint Railway ran from Wimborne Junction, just south of the station on the other side of the River Stour, initially (as the Dorset Central Railway) to Blandford (1860), then (as the Somerset and Dorset Railway) to Burnham in Somerset (1863) and finally to Bath (1874). Wimborne was the point of reversal for trains to and from Poole.

The second route was the Salisbury and Dorset Junction Railway (1866), a minor line which branched off at West Moors. The station there was not opened until 1867, and goods traffic largely continued to be worked through to Wimborne and later beyond. The final new railway, branching off the original main line at New Poole Junction, was to Poole (1872) and onwards to Bournemouth (1874).

== Decline ==
Bournemouth's rapid development in the late Victorian era as a residential town and holiday resort indirectly led to the decline of Wimborne station. The Somerset and Dorset avoided the awkward reversal there by opening a bypass from Corfe Mullen to Broadstone in 1885 (goods) and 1886 (passengers). A handful of local Somerset and Dorset passenger trains still ran into Wimborne, as well as some goods trains, because the large yard made for a more convenient point of interchange. Further decline came in 1888, when Wimborne was bypassed by the opening of a direct line to Bournemouth from the east. When that was extended across Poole Harbour in 1893, to join with the original Southampton and Dorchester line at Hamworthy Junction via the Holes Bay Curve - forming an alternative through-route between Southampton and Weymouth via Bournemouth - most main line passenger trains to and from London, Dorchester and Weymouth had no need to run through Wimborne.

Nevertheless, the generally increasing level of traffic on the railways up to 1914 meant that Wimbone was still a busy station, although post-war economies led to the withdrawal of most remaining Somerset and Dorset passenger trains from 11 July 1920 (just one train probably continued to run until 1922), followed by milk and parcels in February 1932, with freight traffic ceasing completely from 17 June 1933. Loss of the Somerset and Dorset traffic left Wimborne with little more than infrequent pull-push services between Brockenhurst and Bournemouth West, a handful of trains from Salisbury and some long-distance Summer Saturday traffic, when the station was used to relieve Bournemouth. That seasonal holiday traffic built up in the inter-war period and boomed in the 1950s. Through goods trains also used the route all year round to avoid the steep gradients on the Bournemouth route.

== Closure ==
In its final years, the station suffered from an air of neglect, although photographic evidence suggests that the main buildings were kept in a decent state of repair into the early 1960s. An early casualty of the Beeching Axe programme of economies, Wimborne station closed to passengers on 4 May 1964, along with all others on the bypassed original line. Parcels and less-than-wagonload goods ceased from 28 February 1966, and sundries were concentrated on Bournemouth Central. This led to a rationalisation of Wimborne's track and signalling, although traffic was boosted from the late 1960s by the use of the down yard by TrainEx, a company fitting out exhibition trains. From 24 July 1966, siding working was introduced. The down line towards Broadstone was taken out of use and services concentrated on the former up line, although both tracks continued to be used in the Ringwood direction until the closure of the signalbox (which had remained as a ground frame) on 8 January 1967. All remaining signals were removed and points converted to manual operation.

Until August 1967, goods trains continued to serve the station from Poole, running through to West Moors and Ringwood. Thereafter, traffic to Wimborne consisted mostly of coal and similar wagon loads, with the continued use of the line for an RAOC fuel depot just beyond West Moors keeping trains running through until the summer of 1974. The track north of Wimborne was lifted from October 1974, back to a point immediately south of Leigh Arch, the dangerously narrow and low bridge over what was then still the busy A31 road; this allowed the bridge to be demolished. For just over another 30 months, the occasional goods train disturbed the peace of Wimborne's decaying station, although by then the main reason for the line's survival was the use of the yard by TrainEx.

== The site today ==
Until 2021, the site was partly occupied by the weekly Wimborne Market, and industrial and commercial units cover most of the rest. Much of the original embankment was removed around 1983, although it is not clear where the spoil was taken. Some oral accounts say it was used for construction of the Wimborne bypass (A31), while others suggest it was used for reclamation work in Poole Harbour, near the town's railway station.

== Services ==
Preceding station	Disused railways	Following station
West Moors; Line and station closed	Somerset & Dorset Joint Railway; LSWR and Midland Railways; Somerset and Dorset Railway	Bailey Gate; Line and station closed
West Moors; Line and station closed	London and South Western Railway; Southampton and Dorchester Railway	Broadstone; Line and station closed
