= Hamworthy =

Village and parish in Dorset, England

Coordinates: 50.7207°N 2.0109°W

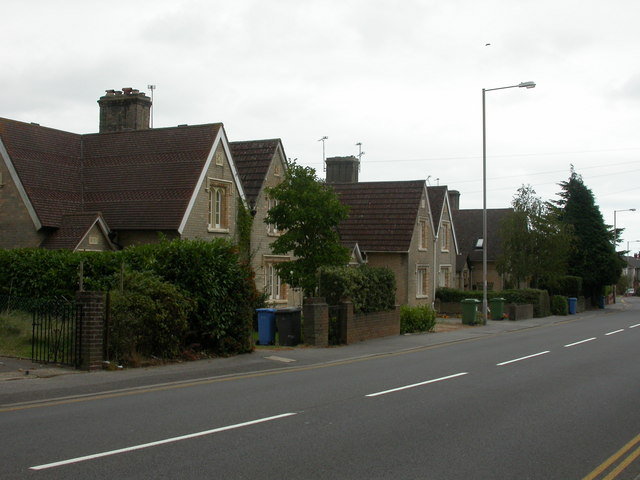
- Lady Wimborne Cottages in Hamworthy

- Location within Dorset
- Population: 13,141 (2011)
- OS grid reference: SY993912
- Unitary authority: Bournemouth, Christchurch and Poole
- Ceremonial county: Dorset
- Region: South West
- Country: England
- Sovereign state: United Kingdom
- Post town: POOLE
- Postcode district: BH15
- Dialling code: 01202
- Police: Dorset
- Fire: Dorset and Wiltshire
- Ambulance: South Western
- UK Parliament: Poole

Hamworthy is a suburb of Poole, in the Bournemouth, Christchurch and Poole district, in the ceremonial county of Dorset, England. It is sited on a peninsula of approximately 3 square kilometres (1.2 mi^{2}) that is bordered by the town of Upton to the north, Poole Harbour to the south, Lytchett Bay to the west and Holes Bay to the east. Poole Bridge, the southern terminus of the A350 road, connects the suburb with the town centre. Hamworthy is the location of the Port of Poole ferry passenger terminal and cargo handling operations.

In Hamworthy there are six main areas, Rockley Park (where Royal Marines Poole and Holiday Park are), Turlin Moor Estate, Lower Hamworthy (where Poole Docks are), Cobbs Quay/Harbourside (Which looks out over Holes Bay), Lake Side (where the Metalbox Factory is located) and Central Hamworthy (Location of the Main Road, Co-Op and Church area).

Hamworthy has a railway station (opened in 1847 as Poole Junction, until renamed in 1872), with a twice hourly South Western Railway service to London Waterloo on the South West Main Line.

== History ==
Vespasian, a Roman general, later Roman Emperor, brought the Second Augustan Legion to the harbour in 43 AD and founded Hamworthy. The Romans continued to use the harbour throughout the occupation. Hamworthy was the site of an Iron Age settlement before it was taken over by the Romans in the 1st century.

The Roman name of the settlement at Hamworthy is unknown. In 1948 Harry Percy Smith identified Hamworthy as the place name MORIONIO from the seventh century manuscript known as the Ravenna Cosmography and that it should be MORICONIVM in correct Latin. He claimed his source for this was Charles Warne’s book Ancient Dorset, but Charles Warne identified MORIONIO with Wareham.

In 2020 Keith Fitzpatrick-Matthews identified the MORIONIO of the Ravenna Cosmography with Charterhouse in Somerset. He suggested that Hamworthy was the name recorded as NOUIOMAGO in the Ravenna Cosmography which he regards as a separate place and not a duplicate entry for the name of Chichester. Noviomagus would mean the new market in Latin and is a common name. Fitzpatrick-Matthews points out that there are at least 23 places with this name in Gaul.

The Romans made use of Poole Harbour, and built a road from Hamworthy which supplied a fortress at Lake Farm, Ashington and a settlement at Vindocladia (Bradbury Rings).

The closure of Poole Power Station in the early 1990s and of other industrial sites close to the bridge has provided an area for regeneration. This included a second bridge crossing, and major house building. The Twin Sails Bridge, opened in March 2012 runs alongside the old lifting bridge.

== Education ==
Hamworthy has four schools: The Cornerstone Academy (ages 11–16), Twin Sails Infant School and Nursery (ages 3–6), Bayside Academy (formerly Turlin Moor Community School) (ages 4–11), and Hamworthy Park Junior School (ages 7–11).

Hamworthy is home to one of the oldest Scout Association groups in the World. 1st Hamworthy Scout Group which has records dating back to October 1908 and still meets every week with a total membership of nearly 150, Beaver Scouts, Cub Scouts and Scouts, 1st Hamworthy Scout Troop was formed out of the original Boys' Brigade unit that had members take part in the original Scout Camp in 1907. The groups records show a Youth Section meeting in Hamworthy under the name of 1st Hamworthy since the original Boy Brigade unit opened in 1883, this unit then transferred membership to the Scout Association in 1908 to become the current Group that exists today. The group was originally one of many in Hamworthy, but has absorbed over groups over time including 2nd Hamworthy, Turlin Moor, Lytchett Bay and St Michaels Church Scout Groups. Today the Group operates sections under two names: 1st Hamworthy and Turlin Moor.

== Hamworthy Churches ==
Hamworthy parish has a number of churches. St. Michael's parish church based on the main Blandford Road is the Church of England parish church. St. Gabriel's church based on Turlin Moor is a smaller Church of England church based in a modern building. There are also other church denominations based in Hamworthy parish.

== Sport ==
Hamworthy has one non-League football clubs: Hamworthy United F.C., which plays at The County Ground in Lower Hamworthy. Poole Borough F.C. play at Turlin Moor Recreation Ground in Upper Hamworthy. Turlin Moor Recreation Ground is also home to Poole Rugby Football Club.

== Leisure ==
Rockley Park is a caravan-park in western Hamworthy.

== Politics ==
Hamworthy is part of the Poole parliamentary constituency. Hamworthy is also part of the Hamworthy ward which elects 3 councillors to Bournemouth, Christchurch and Poole Council. Hamworthy had two local councillors in Poole Borough Council, one for Hamworthy East, and one for Hamworthy West.

In 1901 the civil parish had a population of 1084. On 9 November 1905 the parish was abolished and merged with Poole. It is now in the unparished area of Poole.
