= Wimborne Minster =

Town in Dorset, England

Coordinates: 50.804°N 1.978°W

- Market town and civil parish
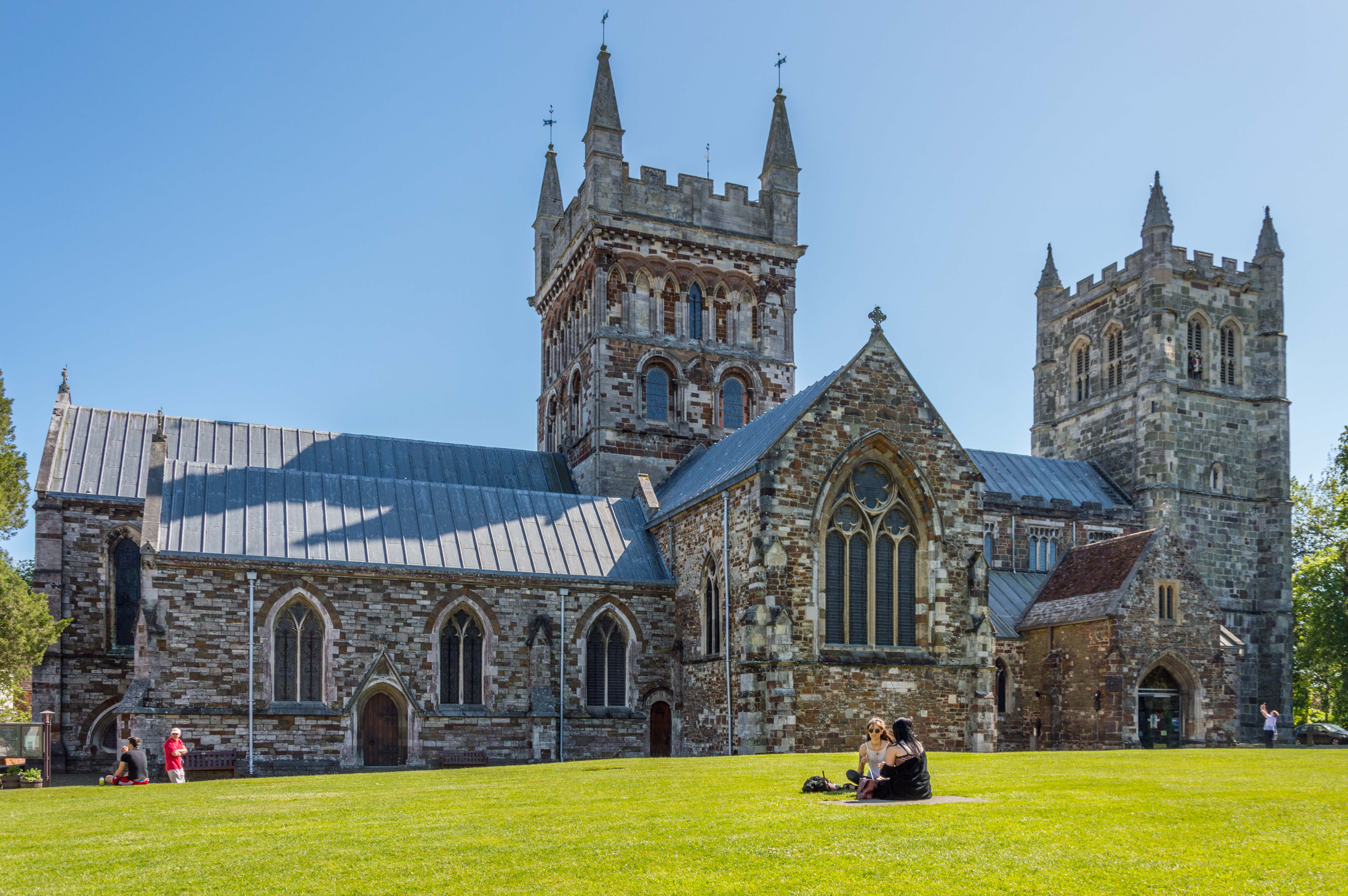
- The medieval Wimborne Minster church

- Location within Dorset
- Interactive map showing the parish boundary
- Area: 4.74 km^{2} (1.83 sq mi)
- Population: 9,059 (2021 census)
  - Density: 1,911/km^{2} (4,950/sq mi)
- OS grid reference: SU015005
- Unitary authority: Dorset
- Ceremonial county: Dorset
- Region: South West
- Country: England
- Sovereign state: United Kingdom
- Post town: Wimborne
- Postcode district: BH21
- Dialling code: 01202
- Police: Dorset
- Fire: Dorset and Wiltshire
- Ambulance: South Western
- UK Parliament: Mid Dorset and North Poole

Wimborne Minster (also known as Wimborne, /ˈwɪmbɔːrn/) is a market town and civil parish in Dorset, England. It lies at the confluence of the River Stour and the River Allen, 5 miles (8 km) north of Poole, on the Dorset Heaths, and is part of the South East Dorset conurbation. At the 2021 census, the parish had a population of 9,059, while the wider Wimborne built-up area (including the neighbouring Colehill) had a population of 16,630.

The name Wimborne derives from the Old English winnburna meaning 'stream by a pasture', while the 'minster' suffix refers to the eponymous church in the town.

== Governance ==
The town and its administrative area are served by eleven councillors plus one from the nearby ward of Cranfield. The electoral ward of Wimborne Minster is slightly bigger than the parish, with a 2021 population of 8,097. Wimborne Minster is part of the Mid Dorset and North Poole parliamentary constituency.

After 2019 structural changes to local government in England, Wimborne Minster is covered by Wimborne Minster and Colehill and Wimborne Minster East for elections to the Dorset Council unitary authority.

== Demographics ==
At the 2021 census, the civil parish had a population of 9,059 people in 4,298 households. The Office for National Statistics also defines a Wimborne Minster built-up area, which includes the urbanised part of the neighbouring Colehill parish; this had a population of 16,630 in 2021.

Census population of Wimborne Minster parish
Census	Population	Female	Male	Households	Notes
1801	3,039	1,647	1,392		
1811	3,158	1,645	1,513		
1821	3,563	1,844	1,719		
1831	4,009	2,076	1,933		
1841	4,326	2,254	2,072		
1851	4,759	2,507	2,252		
1881	5,390	2,792	2,598		
1891	6,203	3,282	2,921		
1901	3,696	2,065	1,631	845	(Note: In 1894, Wimborne parish had been split to create Holt and Pamphill parishes.)
1911	3,711	2,017	1,694	911	
1921	3,743	2,050	1,693	951	
1931	3,895	2,144	1,751	1,071	
1951	4,487	2,473	2,014	1,406	
1961	4,158	2,267	1,891	1,418	
1971	5,000				
1981	5,530				
1991	6,200				
2001	6,418	3,532	2,886	3,150	
2011	6,790	3,641	3,149	3,298	
2021	9,059	4,806	4,253	4,298	(Note: In 2015, the parish boundary between Wimborne and Colehill had been adjusted, bringing new housing into Wimborne parish.)

== Buildings and places of interest ==
Wimborne has one of the foremost collections of 15th-, 16th- and 17th-century buildings in Dorset. Local planning has restricted the construction of new buildings in areas such as the Cornmarket and the High Street, resulting in the preservation of many of the original buildings. Examples include the church of Wimborne Minster, Wimborne Minster Town Hall, the Museum of East Dorset and dozens of 16th-, 17th- and 18th-century fronted shops and pubs. The town is home to the Tivoli Theatre, a 1930s art deco cinema and theatre. Knoll Gardens and Nursery, operated since 2008 by the Knoll Gardens Foundation, is a partner garden of the Royal Horticultural Society.

=== Wimborne Minster Church ===
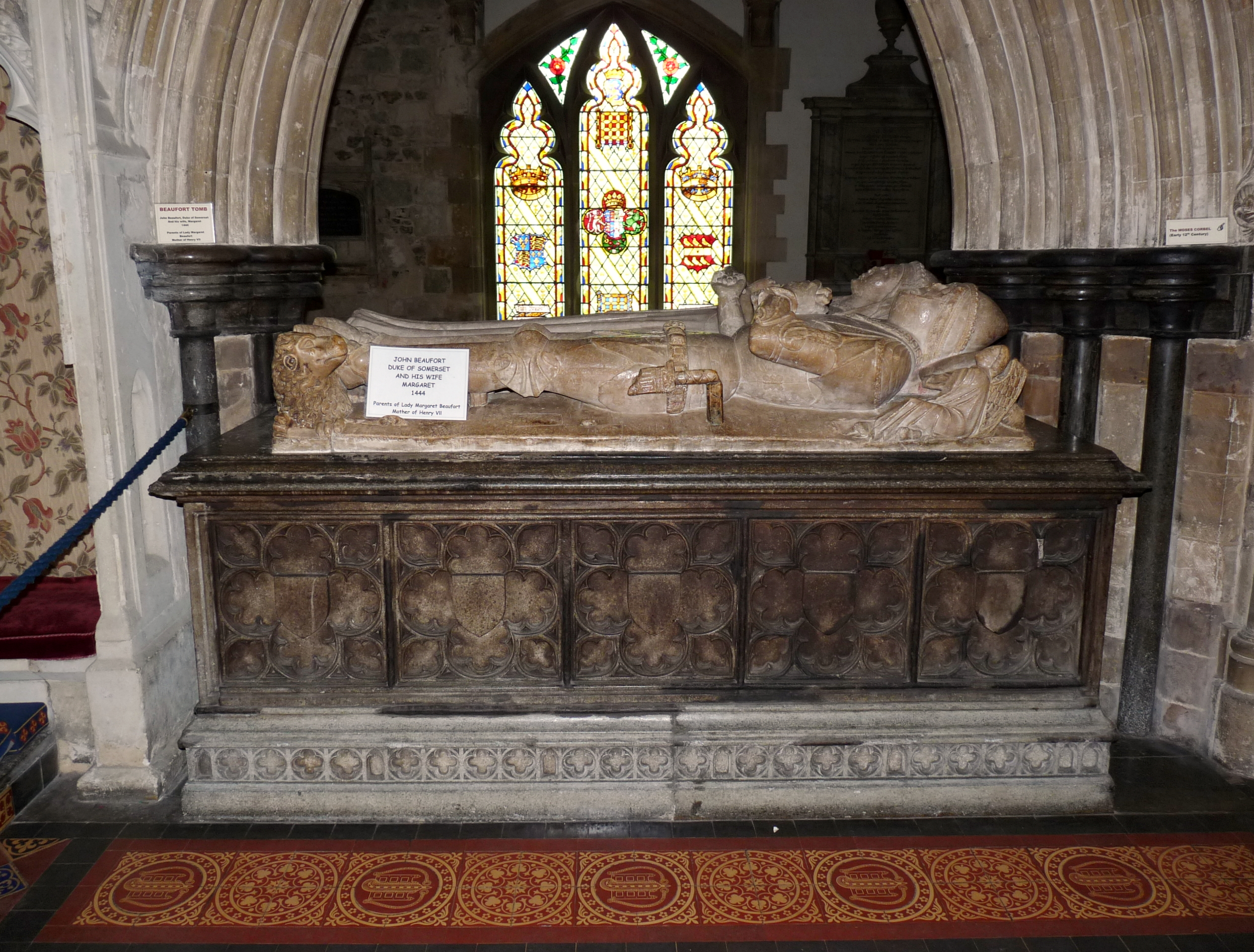
Tomb of John Beaufort

This is a Saxon church, with Norman and Gothic architecture. It is famed for its chained library and the tomb of King Æthelred, elder brother of Alfred the Great, as well as the tombs of John Beaufort, Duke of Somerset, and his duchess, the maternal grandparents of King Henry VII of England. The tombs are made of Dorset Limestone and New Forest Stone.

=== Wimborne Model Town ===
The model town is one of the largest and longest-established model towns in England. It depicts Wimborne at the time the model was made, in the 1950s. It is at 1:10 scale, resulting in the model of the Minster being several feet high. The model shop windows accurately show the goods which the real shops were selling at the time. The exhibition also includes a model railway based on Thomas the Tank Engine, which was opened by Christopher Awdry, and expanded in 2014.

== Culture ==
At weekends and national holidays, the town crier can be seen in the main square and around the Minster. The legacy and position of the town crier date back to the English Civil War. The town has a large civil war reenactment society, which performs every year.

The town has a well-established and large market, the Wimborne Market. The market is held on a Friday, Saturday and Sunday. It was previously located in the town centre but moved out several years ago to a site on the edge of town to accommodate its size.

Every year Wimborne hosts the longest fireworks display in Dorset, as part of its Guy Fawkes celebrations; a county record that it has held since 2004. The bonfire and pyrotechnics display is held each year in the grounds of St Michael's Church of England Middle School and is well supported by many thousands of people from the town, Colehill village and the surrounding area. All proceeds are donated each year to local schools, and since 2004 over £61,000 has been raised for local school projects and equipment.

Every two years in mid-August, the Park Initiative, an interchurch charity working on Leigh Park estate, holds a community event called "Alive in the Park" in the centre of the estate using a large marquee.

Wimborne Minster is twinned with Ochsenfurt in Bavaria, Germany, and Valognes in Normandy, France.

=== Wimborne Minster Folk Festival ===
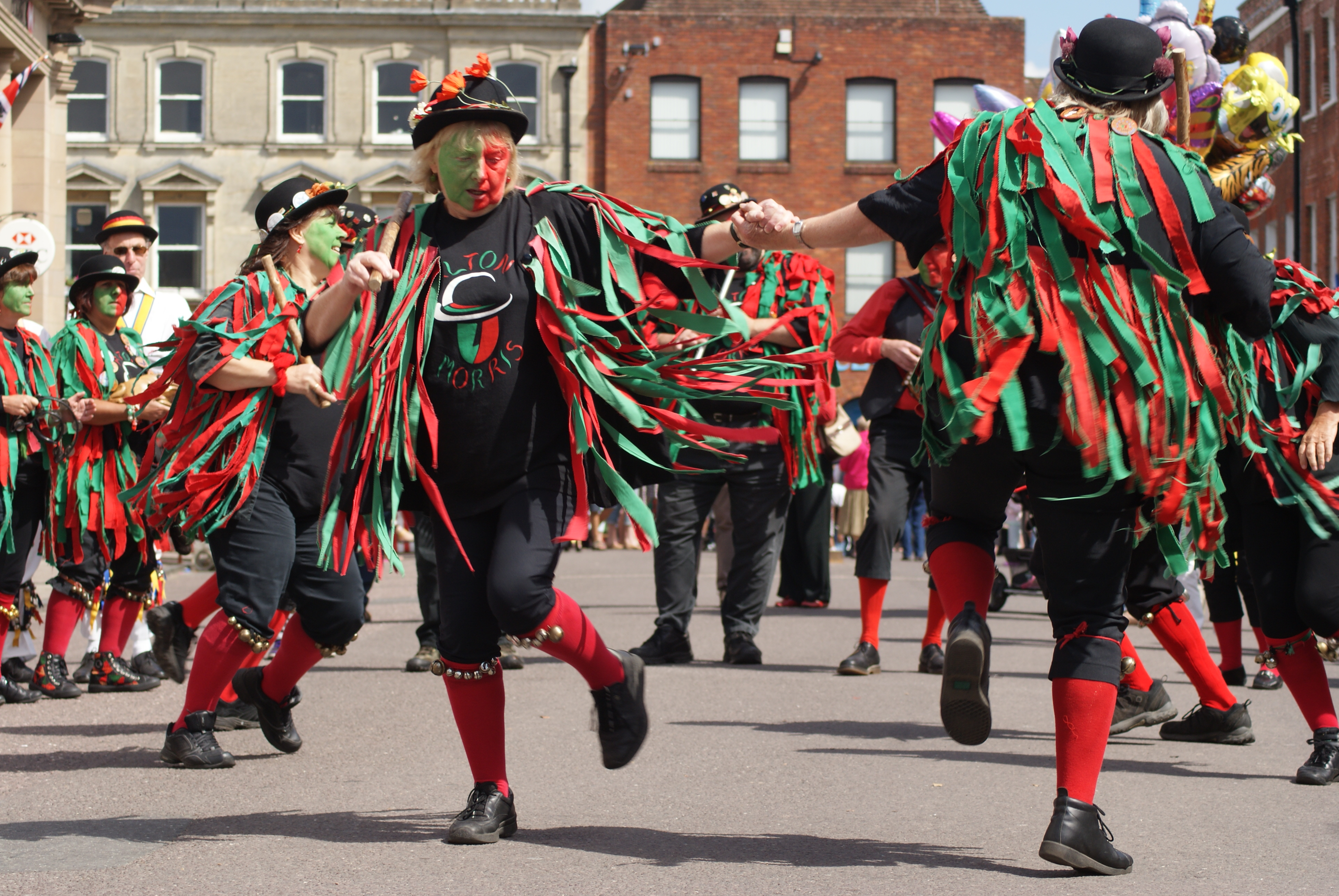
Alton Morris at Wimborne Folk Festival 2011

Every summer in June the town holds the Wimborne Minster Folk Festival. Founded in 1980, the annual event of traditional folk dance and music has become the focal point for one of the largest gathering of dance teams and musicians in the South of England. The festival involves morris dancing, Appalachian dancing, concerts, workshops and children's activities, with parts of the town being closed to traffic.

The Festival planned for 2020 did not go ahead due to the health precautions imposed in response to the COVID-19 pandemic. Instead, with the cooperation of local businesses and Wimborne Minster Town Council, the Folk Festival committee made use of Café @ The Allendale, a local community hub, to provide food and meals for those in difficulties, e.g. as a result of having to self-isolate or not being able to work during the lockdowns. The 2021 Festival also had to be cancelled but an online event took place over the usual second weekend in June.

== Education and schools ==
The town has three first schools (St John's, Wimborne and Pamphill) and two middle schools (St Michael's and Allenbourn). Wimborne First School, formerly Wimborne Primary School, has been educating the children of Wimborne Minster to primary level since 1911. Wimborne and the adjacent area of Merley are served by two upper schools: Corfe Hills School and Queen Elizabeth's School.

Queen Elizabeth's School has very close links with the Minster and was founded by Lady Margaret Beaufort in 1497. After her death the school became Wimborne Grammar School. Although the grammar school buildings still remain they have now been converted to flats. The school was established on its current site in 1972 after the merging of Wimborne Grammar School and the county modern school.

The private schools Dumpton School and Canford School are both located nearby. The nearby first schools of Hayeswood and Colehill serve Wimborne.

== Healthcare ==
Wimborne has a community hospital, Victoria Hospital, with a minor injuries unit. It was built as a cottage hospital in 1887, and named for the Golden Jubilee of Queen Victoria. Annie Mary Lindsay was matron from 1895 until at least 1911. Lindsay trained at The London Hospital under Matron Eva Luckes between 1886 and 1888.

== Media ==
Local news and television programmes are provided by BBC South and ITV Meridian. Television signals are received from Rowridge transmitting station and the local relay transmitter in Winterborne Stickland. BBC West and ITV West Country can also be received from the Mendip transmitting station.

The town's local radio stations are BBC Radio Solent on 96.1 FM, Heart South on 102.3 FM, Nation Radio South Coast on 106.6 FM, Greatest Hits Radio South on 105.8 FM and Radio Wimborne, a community radio station that broadcast on 94.6 FM.

Local newspapers that served the town are the Dorset Echo and Bournemouth Daily Echo.

== Sport ==
The local football club Wimborne Town play in the Southern Football League.

In rugby union, Wimborne R.F.C. has been in existence in its present form since 1950 and is based in Leigh Park, Gordon Road on the eastern side of the town.

Cricket has been played in Wimborne since at least 1793, when the club was known as Hanham's Cricket Club, playing on the green in the centre of town from 1860. In 2010, the club moved to its new ground at The Leaze as part of the planning application which allowed Waitrose to build a new supermarket on the site of the original Wimborne Cricket Club. The club's four adult teams play in the Dorset Cricket League and the 1st XI have won the Dorset Premier League title in 1997, 2012, 2016 and 2018. Dorset County Cricket Club played home matches at Wimborne sporadically from the 1957 until 1979 before returning in 2018 to Wimborne's current ground at The Leaze.

== Economy ==
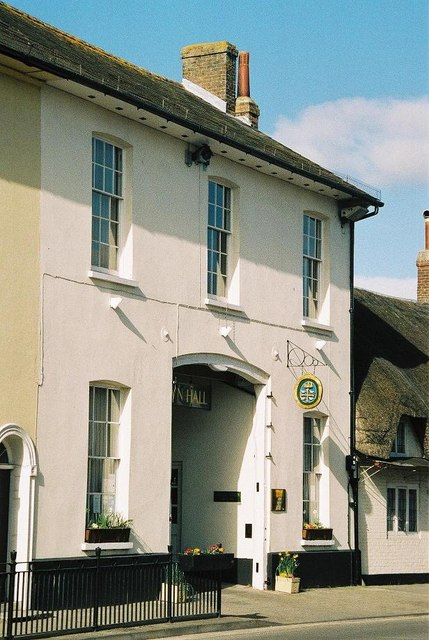
Wimborne Minster Town Hall

The aerospace company Cobham plc has headquarters in Wimborne. Home decoration company Farrow & Ball began in the town, and is still headquartered nearby in Ferndown. The economy of the town is dedicated towards leisure and has shops, restaurants and pubs. Tourism is an aspect in the town's economy. The town is also served by a Waitrose located on the old Cricket Green and a Co-op supermarket.

== Transport ==
The town was served by Wimborne railway station from 1847 to 1977. The station had two platforms and was built for the Southampton and Dorchester Railway, later part of the London and South Western Railway. It was expanded when the Somerset and Dorset Joint Railway was constructed between Bath and Poole. Wimborne was used as a reversing point on the Somerset and Dorset, but its importance was reduced when an avoiding line was built from Bailey Gate to Broadstone Junction. The station had a large goods yard, the site of which is used for the weekly Wimborne Market. The station was closed to passengers in 1964 and sundries (parcels and light goods) in 1966, as a result of the Beeching Axe programme. The final goods trains ran in May 1977.

Buses now serve as the only means of public transport to and from Wimborne. Wilts & Dorset subsidiary Morebus operates half-hourly routes 3, 4 to Poole and 13, 13a to Bournemouth.

== Notable people ==
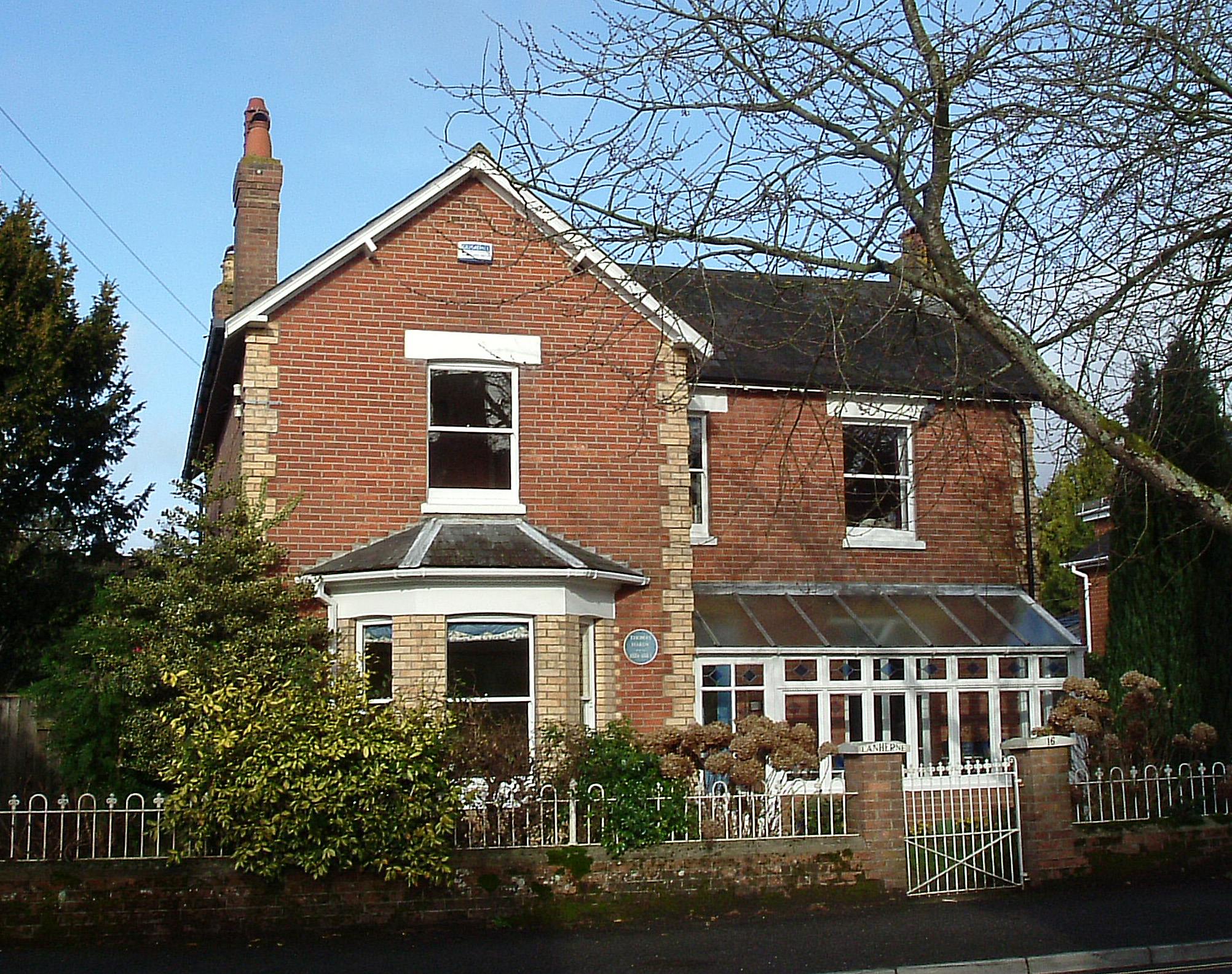
Thomas Hardy's house (1881 to 1883), Avenue Road

- Tim Berners-Lee, inventor of the World Wide Web
- Lieutenant William Cox (1764–1837), Australian pioneer born in Wimborne.
- John Creasey, English crime writer, lived at "Cattistock", Fernlea Avenue, Ferndown during the 1940s.
- Montague Druitt, suspect in the Jack the Ripper murders
- Robert Fripp, guitarist in prog rock band King Crimson
- Jimmy Glass, former professional footballer
- George Gray, Professor of Organic Chemistry at the University of Hull
- Isaac Gulliver, English smuggler
- Thomas Hardy, lived in Avenue Road, where he wrote A Pair of Blue Eyes (1873), commemorated by a blue plaque
- Eddie Howe, Football coach, attended Queen Elizabeth's School.
- Josephine Kermode, Manx poet and playwright, better known by her pen name Cushag, lived the last five years of her life in Wimborne
- Christopher Le Fleming (1908–1985), composer and music administrator
- Saint Leoba (c. 710 – 28 September 782) was an oblate at Wimborne Minster
- George Douglas-Hamilton, 10th Earl of Selkirk (1906–1994), Chancellor of the Duchy of Lancaster and Commissioner for Singapore and Southeast Asia, was born at Merley House
- Walter Parke (1891–1914), first-class cricketer and British Army officer
- Matthew Prior (1664–1721), English diplomat and poet, was born in Wimborne and lived there during his early childhood.
- Walter Shaw (1868–1937), former Chief Justice of the Straits Settlements and Chairman of the Shaw Commission
- Al Stewart, Scottish musician and singer-songwriter, grew up in the town.
- Gordon Haskell, singer-songwriter, grew up in the town and went to Queen Elizabeth Grammar School.
- William Charles Wentworth, Australian statesman and explorer, died in Wimborne in 1872.
- Electric Wizard, stoner rock/doom metal band
