= W/L Cave =

Cave in Somerset, England

Coordinates: 51°13′34″N 2°29′31″W

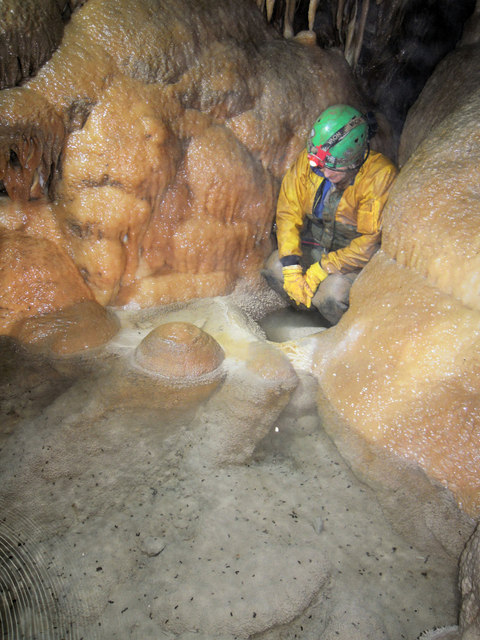
- Interactive map of W/L Cave
- Location: Fairy Cave Quarry
- OS grid: ST 6573 4753
- Geology: Limestone

W/L Cave is part of the Fairy Cave Quarry group of caves between Stoke St Michael and Oakhill in the limestone of the Mendip Hills, in Somerset, England.

It is named after the initials of its discoverers, Bob Whitaker and Jerry Lavis, was first entered in the summer of 1967. It was the first significant cave to be discovered after the destruction of Balch Cave in the same (Fairy Cave) quarry.

Although short it was extremely well decorated with calcite formations and ended in a large chamber with a magnificent side grotto dubbed Pink Pool Chamber. It is almost certainly part of the Balch Cave system and is the link between Balch Cave and the other systems in Fairy Cave Quarry namely Shatter Cave and Withyhill Cave. The link was proved by a digging project conducted by Pete Rose and Nick Chipchase of the Cerberus Spelaeological Society, the HQ of which club used to lie adjacent to the quarry in cottages owned by the quarry company. Pink Pool Chamber is linked to the first chamber in Shatter Cave by a narrow passage opened by blasting by the above named cavers.
