= Hillier's Cave =

Cave in Somerset, England

Coordinates: 51°13′33″N 2°29′32″W

- Interactive map of Hillier's Cave
- Location: Stoke St Michael
- Discovery: 1954
- Geology: Limestone

Hillier's Cave (grid reference ST65734753) is a cave in Fairy Cave Quarry, near Stoke St Michael in the limestone of the Mendip Hills, in Somerset, England.

It falls within the St. Dunstan's Well Catchment Site of Special Scientific Interest.

The cave was discovered on 13 February 1954, when blasting at one of the working faces opened up a cave passage, and is now choked with sludge waste from the quarry. It was first explored by John Anthony Quinn and boys from Midsomer Norton Grammar School (now Norton Hill School) who named it in honour of Gordon Hillier who was headmaster of the school from 1926 to 1958.

The Fairy Caves Management Committee administers the access to this cave on behalf of the quarry owners.

== See also ==
- Caves of the Mendip Hills
