= Balch Cave =

Cave in Somerset, England

Coordinates: 51°13′33″N 2°29′32″W

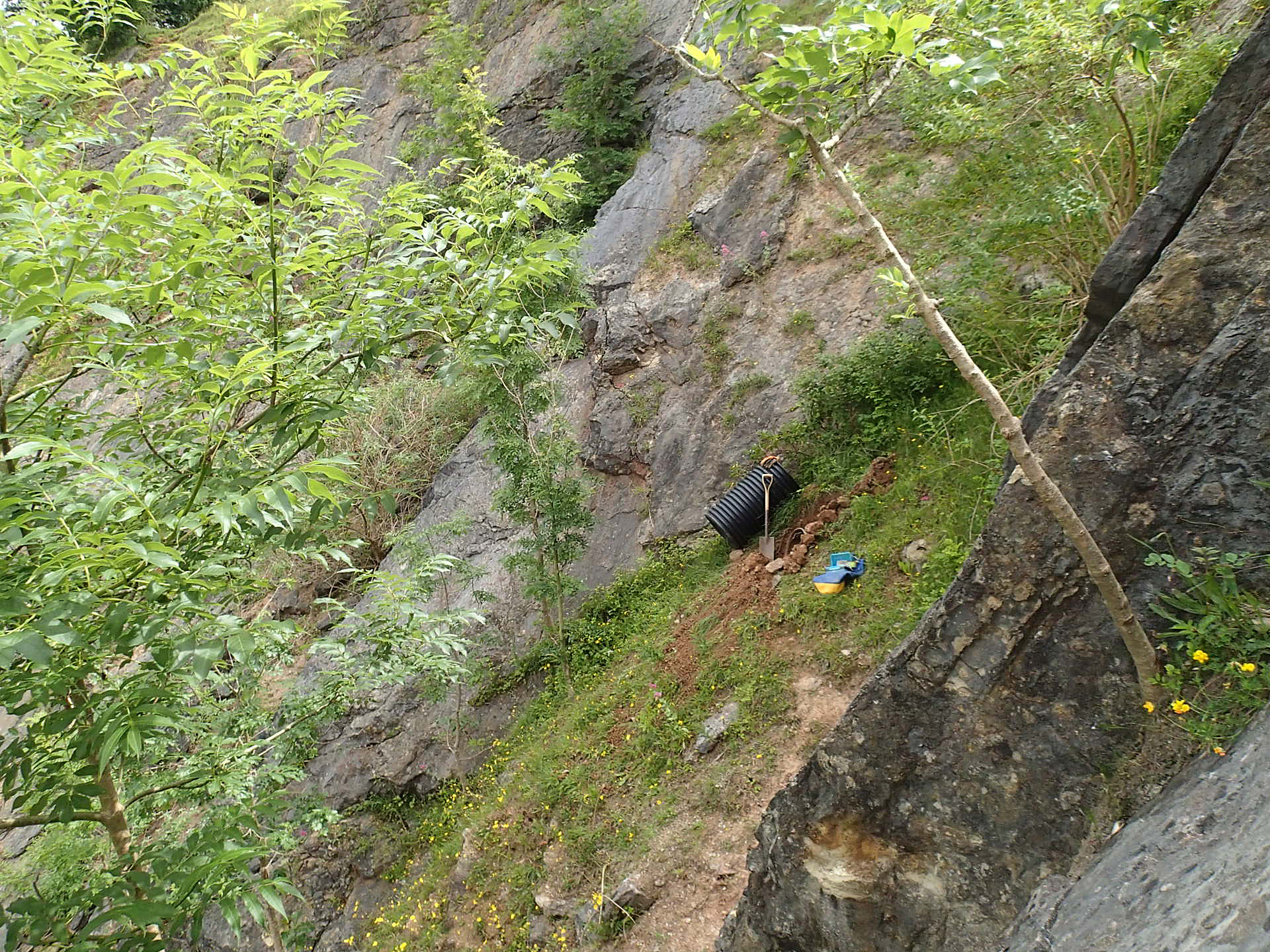
- Entrance drum being replaced for Balch Cave Aven Chamber Series
- Interactive map of Balch Cave
- Location: Stoke St Michael
- Discovery: 1961
- Geology: Limestone

Balch Cave (grid reference ST65734753) is a cave in Fairy Cave Quarry, near Stoke St Michael in the limestone of the Mendip Hills, in Somerset, England. The cave is part of the complex of passages feeding to St. Dunstan's Well Catchment Site of Special Scientific Interest and an abandoned Bristol Water abstraction point.

It is named in honour of Herbert E. Balch who was famous for his exploration of the Caves of the Mendip Hills.

The cave was broken into by quarry blasting in November 1961. Much of the cave has since been quarried away and by the end of the 1960s, major sections were destroyed.

An exploration in December 1961 found a series of decorated rifts, mainly of sparkling flowstone, with a grotto fillet with pure white stalactites and pillars and a set of "organ pipes" about 10 feet (3 m) wide and 15 feet (5 m) high.

A further visit in January 1962 explored the fourth chamber which is richly ornamented with white and cream flowstone, several narrow curtains, and miscellaneous white stalactites, and the fifth and sixth chambers with multiple Stalagmite formations.

In the subsequent years continued blasting from the quarry breached the central chambers of the cave destroying some 425 feet (130 m) of passages, with rockfalls destroying many of the remaining formations, and rendering other sections of the cave inaccessible. Stabilisation work at the end of the quarry's life resulted in the destruction of a further 300 feet (91 m) of passage, including the original entrance series and Great Chamber.

The Fairy Caves Management Committee administers the access to this cave on behalf of the quarry owners. The cave is closed from 1 October to 30 April to protect the hibernating bats.

== See also ==
- Caves of the Mendip Hills
