= Kilmersdon =

Village in Somerset, England

Coordinates: 51.270°N 2.438°W

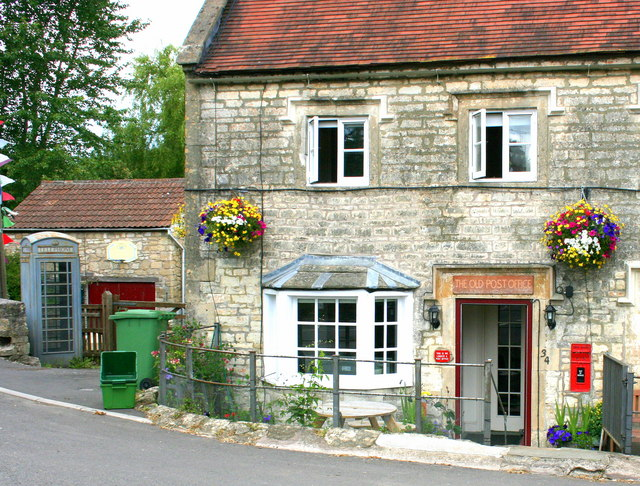
- The old post office

- Location within Somerset
- Population: 541 (2011)
- OS grid reference: ST695525
- Civil parish: Kilmersdon
- Unitary authority: Somerset Council
- Ceremonial county: Somerset
- Region: South West
- Country: England
- Sovereign state: United Kingdom
- Post town: RADSTOCK
- Postcode district: BA3
- Dialling code: 01761
- Police: Avon and Somerset
- Fire: Devon and Somerset
- Ambulance: South Western
- UK Parliament: Frome and East Somerset

Kilmersdon is a village and civil parish on the north eastern slopes of the Mendip Hills in Somerset between the towns of Radstock and Frome. It is located on the B3139 between Wells and Trowbridge in Wiltshire. The settlement is recorded in William I's Domesday Book and dates back at least 1,000 years; though the core of the village dates from the mid nineteenth century. The parish includes the hamlets of Charlton, South View and Green Parlour.

== History ==
The name Kilmersdon means 'Cynemaer's Hill'. The parish was part of the Kilmersdon Hundred.

Kilmersdon is said to be the "home" of the Jack and Jill nursery rhyme, the fabled hill being recently restored as part of a local Millennium scheme. Immediately adjacent to the newly restored well is Kilmersdon Primary School, which was established (though not in the current building) in 1707. Other amenities include Norton Garden Machinery (formerly a petrol station and garage) and The Jolliffe Arms named after the Jolliffe family. The Jolliffe's estate is responsible for building much of modern Kilmersdon. The local village main store and combined post office closed in 1998.

Nearby is the Ammerdown Conference and Retreat Centre. Lord Hylton's son Andrew and his family live at Ammerdown — the current Lord Hylton lives in Hemington. The family's estate covers some of the nearby villages including Kilmersdon, and many of the cottages in this estate are owned and run by a charitable housing association set up by Lord Hylton to continue to provide affordable housing for local residents.

A pair of old lodges, gate piers and gates, associated with Ammerdown House, which were built in 1788–94 by James Wyatt, are Grade II* listed buildings and on the English Heritage register of buildings at risk.

== Kilmersdon colliery ==
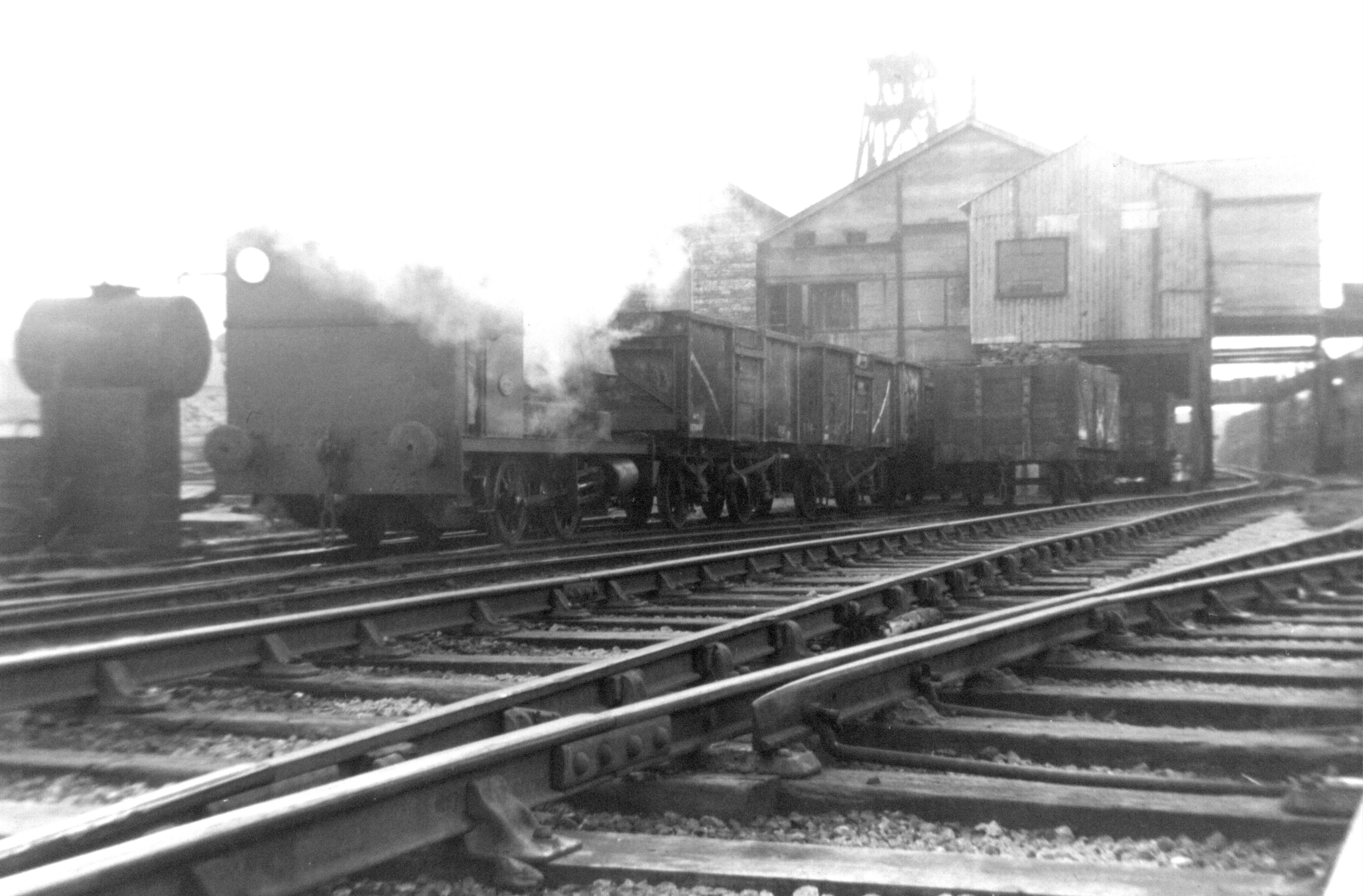
Peckett 0-4-0ST No.1788 (built 1929) works wagons under the coal wash from Kilmersdon Colliery, 1969

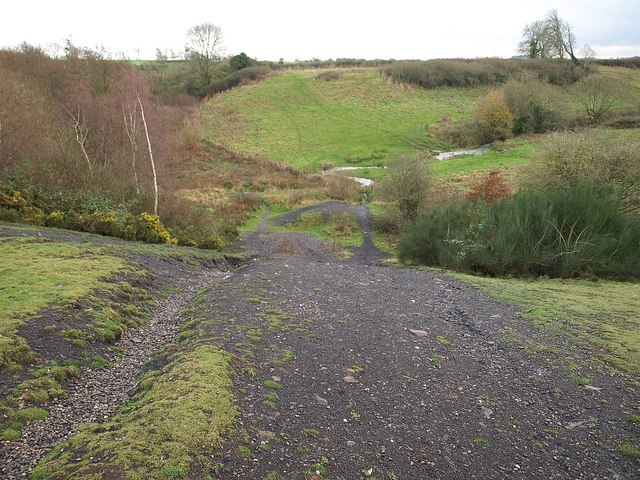
Former colliery coal tip, located in Waterside valley

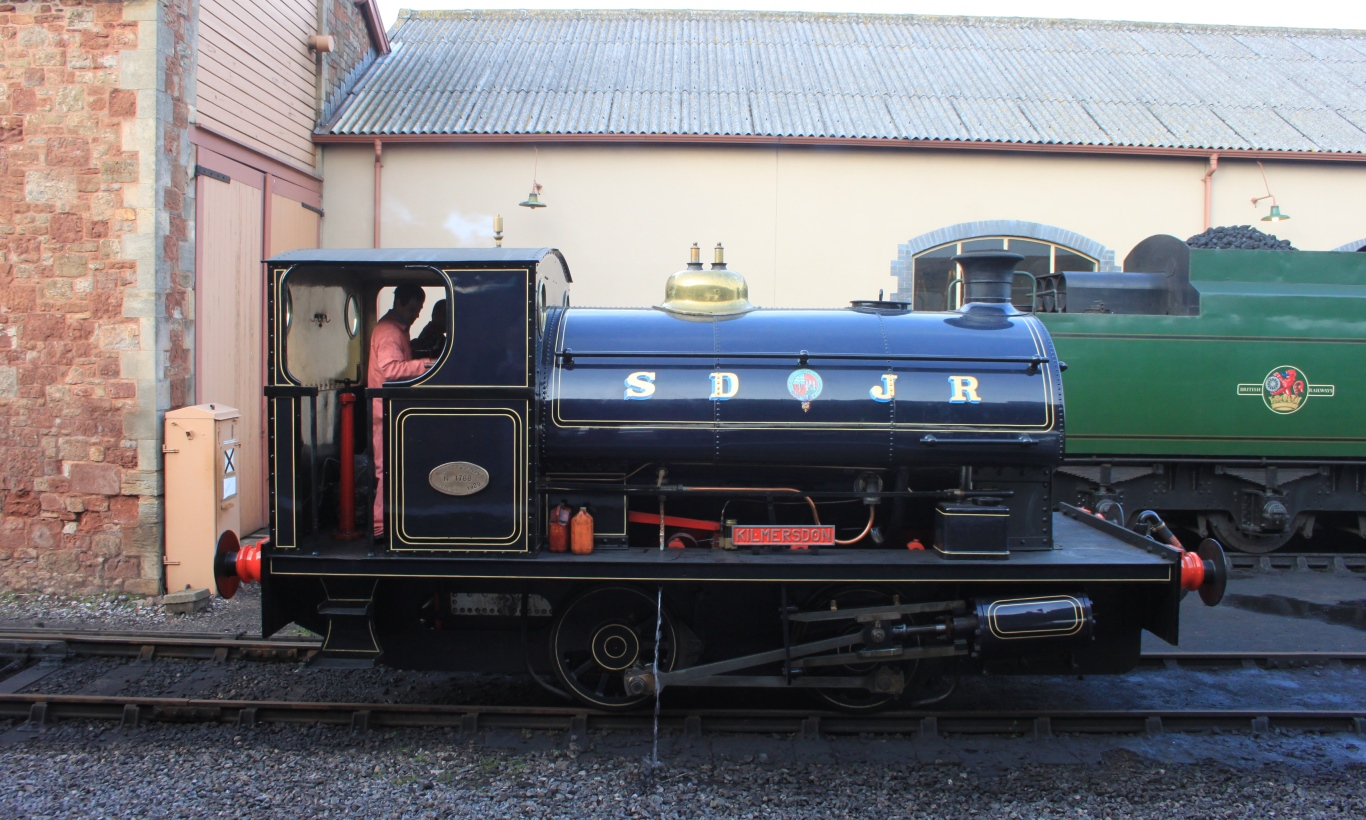
The Somerset and Dorset Railway Trust's Peckett 0-4-0ST Kilmersdon, resting outside Minehead engine shed on the West Somerset Railway

The village lies directly above the Somerset coalfield, and as in surrounding locations there is evidence to suggest coal extraction in the area from Roman times, with documentary evidence of coal extraction at Kilmersdon starting in 1437. Kilmersdon Colliery was established from February 1875 as part of the Writhlington group of collieries. Access to coal mining beneath Kilmersdon was through a network of tunnels from an entrance in the nearby hamlet of Haydon, so that the colliery was also known as Haydon Pit. The maximum depth of the shaft reached close to 500 metres (1,600 ft).

In the highly complex and disturbed local geological structure, coal in the 4 feet (1.2 m) high seams was extracted by hand using the “topple down” method. Once carting boys had extracted cut coal to the main shaft, it was placed into trams for extraction to the surface, at a maximum rate of 90 trams or 85 tonnes/hour. After transfer there to standard gauge 16-tonne coal wagons, the latter were individually transported via one of three standard gauge rope worked inclines in the Somerset Coalfield, the last gravity-working industrial rope-incline in the United Kingdom. Constructed in 1877, the double-track incline was 160 yards (150 m) long with an overall gradient of 1 in 4. Sidings were added at the head of the incline in 1900 to allow colliery dirt to be dumped there. At its foot the incline junctioned in a triangular configuration with the Radstock-to-Frome section of the GWR's Bristol and North Somerset Railway. Here the northern triangular section sidings held empty wagons waiting to be taken up, whilst the southern section sidings contained loaded wagons awaiting pick-up by the GWR.

Nationalised after World War II as part of the National Coal Board, the mine became the last colliery working the Somerset Coalfield. During its later years, the extracted coal was transported under contract to Portishead power station. The mine was closed in August 1973, its structures demolished and the shaft filled; this was followed by extensive landscaping. Former joint-railway structures which existed at the foot of the rope-worked incline were demolished in 2005.

The route of the former railway has today been adapted and absorbed into National Cycle Route 24, the Colliers Way. The nearby Kilmersdon Road Quarry is a 0.43 hectare geological Site of Special Scientific Interest. The last steam locomotive to work at the colliery and hence within the Somerset Coalfield, Peckett and Sons 0-4-0T Kilmersdon is now owned by the Somerset and Dorset Railway Trust, housed at Washford on the West Somerset Railway. During 2018 this steam locomotive was the main running locomotive for the Helston Railway and was due to stay until winter 2019, when the locomotive's boiler ticket expired.

== Governance ==
Kilmersdon Parish Council has responsibility for local issues. This includes setting an annual precept (local rate) to cover the council’s operating costs and producing annual accounts for public scrutiny. The parish council evaluates local planning applications and works with the local police, district council officers, and neighbourhood watch groups on matters of crime, security, and traffic. The parish council's role also includes initiating projects for the maintenance and repair of parish facilities, as well as consulting with the district council on the maintenance, repair, and improvement of highways, drainage, footpaths, public transport, and street cleaning. Conservation matters (including trees and listed buildings) and environmental issues are also the responsibility of the council.

Previously part of Frome Rural District, from 1 April 1974 the village lay within the non-metropolitan district of Mendip; Somerset County Council was responsible for running the largest and most expensive local services. Since 2023 Kilmersdon has fallen within the unitary authority of Somerset Council, being a county council which also performs the functions of a district council.

It is also part of the Frome and East Somerset parliamentary constituency represented in the House of Commons of the Parliament of the United Kingdom. It elects one Member of Parliament (MP) by the first past the post system of election.

Haydon, where the Kilmersdon pit-head was, is in a different local authority area, Bath and North East Somerset.

== Religious sites ==
Kilmersdon Church (St Peter and St Paul) is located in the centre of the village. It dates back to the Norman period, though much of the current structure was built during the Victorian era. The tower is in four stages, includes corner buttresses with shafts and pinnacles, and is connected across the angle. The tower contains a ring of six bells, the heaviest being a tenor of 21 cwt. The summit has large corner shafts with pinnacles. There are traceried 3-light bell-chamber windows with a dense quatrefoil interlace and blank 2-light windows on the two lower stages. The flanked niches were for statuary, however this is now missing. The church has a triangular lychgate designed by Sir Edwin Lutyens. It is a Grade I listed building.

== Notable people ==
- The children's author Steve Voake was head teacher of Kilmersdon Primary School for eight years.
- Comedy actor John Thomson was married in the church.
