= Cook's Wood Quarry =

Geological Site of Special Scientific Interest in Somerset, England

- Site of Special Scientific Interest
- Location within Somerset
- Location of Cook's Wood Quarry.
- Area of search: Somerset
- Grid reference: ST669479
- Coordinates: 51.22932°N 2.47542°W
- Interest: Geological
- Area: 0.8 hectares (0.0080 km^{2}; 0.0031 sq mi)
- Notification date: 1988

Cook's Wood Quarry also known as Holcombe Quarry (grid reference ST669479) is a 0.8-hectare (2.0-acre) geological Site of Special Scientific Interest near Stoke St Michael on the Mendip Hills in Somerset, notified in 1988.

This is a Geological Conservation Review Site. This site partially overlaps with St. Dunstan's Well Catchment SSSI.

The main exposures are cut in very steeply-dipping Carboniferous Limestone. This was the original locality for the type section of the proposed ‘Cookswoodian Stage’.

9 species of Bat, Dormice and four species of Newts including the rare Great Crested Newt reside in Cooks Wood Quarry.

Planning permission for the disused quarry has been granted to turn it into a holiday retreat.

== See also ==
- Quarries of the Mendip Hills
