= Dinies Camp =

Iron Age hillfort in Somerset, England

- Location within Somerset
- 51.2108°N 2.4642°W
- Location: Downhead, Somerset, England

History
- Built: Bronze Age – Iron Age

Scheduled monument
- Official name: Croydon Hill

Dinies Camp is a univallate Iron Age hill fort enclosure in the Mendip district of Somerset, England. The hill fort is situated approximately 1 mile (1.6 km) south-west from the village of Downhead. The hill fort is considered to be medieval as it is on the site of earlier earthwork.

== See also ==
- List of hill forts and ancient settlements in Somerset
