= Church of St Michael, Stoke St Michael =

Church in Somerset, England

Church of St Michael
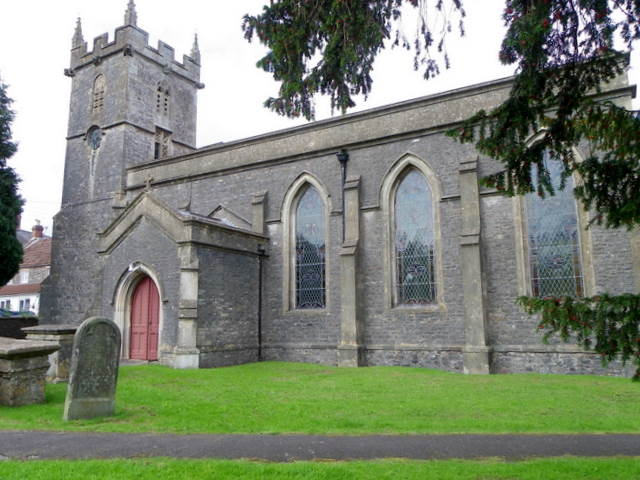

- Location within Somerset
- 51.2210°N 2.4819°W
- Location: Stoke St Michael, Somerset, England

History
- Built: c. 1400

Listed Building – Grade II*
- Official name: Church of St Michael
- Designated: 2 June 1961
- Reference no.: 1173964

The Anglican Church of St Michael in Stoke St Michael, Somerset, England was built around 1400. It is a Grade II* listed building.

== History ==
The western tower survives from the building constructed around 1400. The remainder was largely being rebuilt as part of a Victorian restoration in 1838 by Jesse Gane.

The church was a chapelry of Doulting.

The parish is part of the Leigh-on-Mendip with Downhead and Stoke St Michael benefice within the Diocese of Bath and Wells.

== Architecture ==
The stone building has a five-bay nave and a chancel.

The tower is supported by diagonal buttresses.

== See also ==
- List of ecclesiastical parishes in the Diocese of Bath and Wells
