= Baltonsborough =

Village and civil parish in Somerset, England

Coordinates: 51.111°N 2.655°W

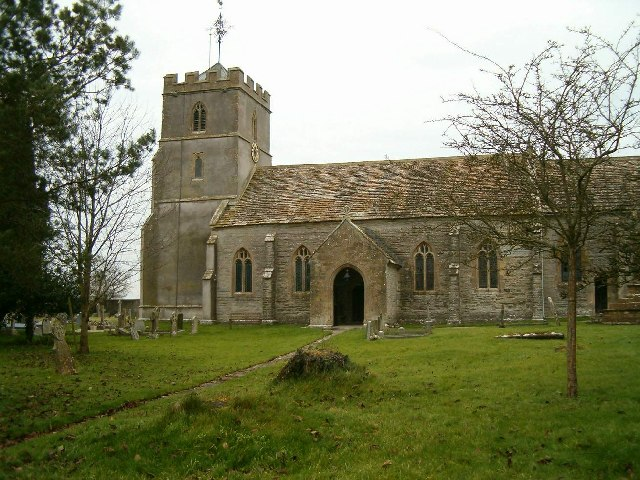
- St Dunstan's Church, Baltonsborough

- Location within Somerset
- Population: 864 (2011 Census)
- OS grid reference: ST542348
- Civil parish: Baltonsborough
- Unitary authority: Somerset Council
- Ceremonial county: Somerset
- Region: South West
- Country: England
- Sovereign state: United Kingdom
- Post town: GLASTONBURY
- Postcode district: BA6
- Dialling code: 01458
- Police: Avon and Somerset
- Fire: Devon and Somerset
- Ambulance: South Western
- UK Parliament: Glastonbury and Somerton
- Website: Baltonsborough Parish Council

Baltonsborough is a village and civil parish in Somerset, England. The parish had a population of 864 at the 2011 Census. As well as Baltonsborough village, the parish contains the hamlets of Ham Street, Catsham and Southwood.

== History ==
The parish was part of the hundred of Glaston Twelve Hides.

The first clue as to the origins of Baltonsborough lies in the name. The village stands on a slight rise beyond what would have been a sea of water between it and Glastonbury. The highest point, now known as Windmill Hill, would have been the site of the settlement, ringed round with ditches and palisades. One authority gives the possible translation of Baltonsborough as Bealdhas Hill, another as Baldurs Stockade. Legend has it that men of Baltonsborough joined King Arthur in his wars against the Saxons in the 6th century, although the earliest written evidence is from a deed dated 744AD, in which ten hides of land in Baltunesberghe was given to the Abbot of Glastonbury. Other variations of the name include Baltenesbergh (c1250) and Balsborowe (1536), The abbreviated Balsbury appears at intervals in later records, mostly of a more casual nature. In 1989 there was an attempt to adopt this, mostly in order to shorten the length of the village nameplates, a movement which attracted the attention of the national press but very little enthusiasm from the villagers.

Baltonsborough is a sprawling village with five small centres, the main part nestling around the Church, an early 15th-century Perpendicular-style building. Ham Street to the east and West Town on the western fringe are slowly being joined to the centre by new housing, whereas Southwood and Catsham to the south remain largely unchanged. The names Northwood and Southwood still exist as evidence of the 800 acres of oak woodland mentioned in the Domesday Book of 1086. Although there is still evidence of the medieval strip fields to the north and south of the village centre, there is little or no modern arable farming, the few remaining farms concentrating on dairy farming for which the land is more suitable. The old cider apple orchards are slowly disappearing, accelerated by the closure of the Cider Mill in the 1950s and the unrealistic price offered by modern apple juice and cider factories.

Not far from the Church along the Mill Stream is the site of the old tannery, also used later as a cider mill, a waste paper reclamation works and now a modern housing estate. Next door is the old water grist mill, converted to a private house in the late 1960s, and the ancient Gatehouse, a fine 14th-century stone-built house, named after a family of linen weavers. On Ham Street a commercial business was built on the legendary site of the birthplace of St Dunstan in 909AD, to whom the Church is dedicated, later to become abbot of Glastonbury and Archbishop of Canterbury. Other buildings of interest include the Moravian Chapel, minister's house and school on Ham Street, now all in private ownership; Lubborn House where Messrs Whitehead and Mullins ran a national cheese dealership at the end of the 19th century; and Hillside House (complete with tunnel into the hill) and Orchard Neville House, both substantial houses built by the same builder/architect in the mid 19th century.

== Governance ==
The parish council has responsibility for local issues, including setting an annual precept (local rate) to cover the council's operating costs and producing annual accounts for public scrutiny. The parish council evaluates local planning applications and works with the local police, district council officers, and neighbourhood watch groups on matters of crime, security, and traffic. The parish council's role also includes initiating projects for the maintenance and repair of parish facilities, as well as consulting with the district council on the maintenance, repair, and improvement of highways, drainage, footpaths, public transport, and street cleaning. Conservation matters (including trees and listed buildings) and environmental issues are also the responsibility of the council.

For local government purposes, the village falls within the Somerset Council unitary authority area, which was created on 1 April 2023. From 1894 to 31 March 1974, the village was part of Wells Rural District, and from 1 April 1974 to 31 March 2023, it was part of the non-metropolitan district of Mendip.

It is also part of the Glastonbury and Somerton represented in the House of Commons of the Parliament of the United Kingdom. It elects one Member of Parliament (MP) by the first past the post system of election.

== Landmarks ==
The Gatehouse is a thatched house dating from the 16th century.

== Church ==
Baltonsborough's Church of St Dunstan was built in the 15th century to honour the most famous son of the village. The church's simple Somerset tower is topped by an elaborate ironwork weather vane crafted by the local blacksmith in the 19th century.

== Notable residents ==
- St Dunstan, born in Baltonsborough in 909, eventually became Archbishop of Canterbury and an important monastic reformer of the Anglo-Saxon period. Legends attached to Dunstan portray him nailing a horseshoe onto the devil, earning him a place as a patron saint of blacksmiths in the Roman Catholic pantheon.
- Thomas Austin, held responsible for introducing Rabbits in Australia, was born in Baltonsborough
- Robert Jacob, Canadian politician
- Nicolas Cage, American film actor
- Edward Noel Mellish, VC Medal winner WW1
