= Stoke Lane Slocker =

Limestone cave in Somerset, England

Coordinates: 51°13′31″N 2°28′33″W

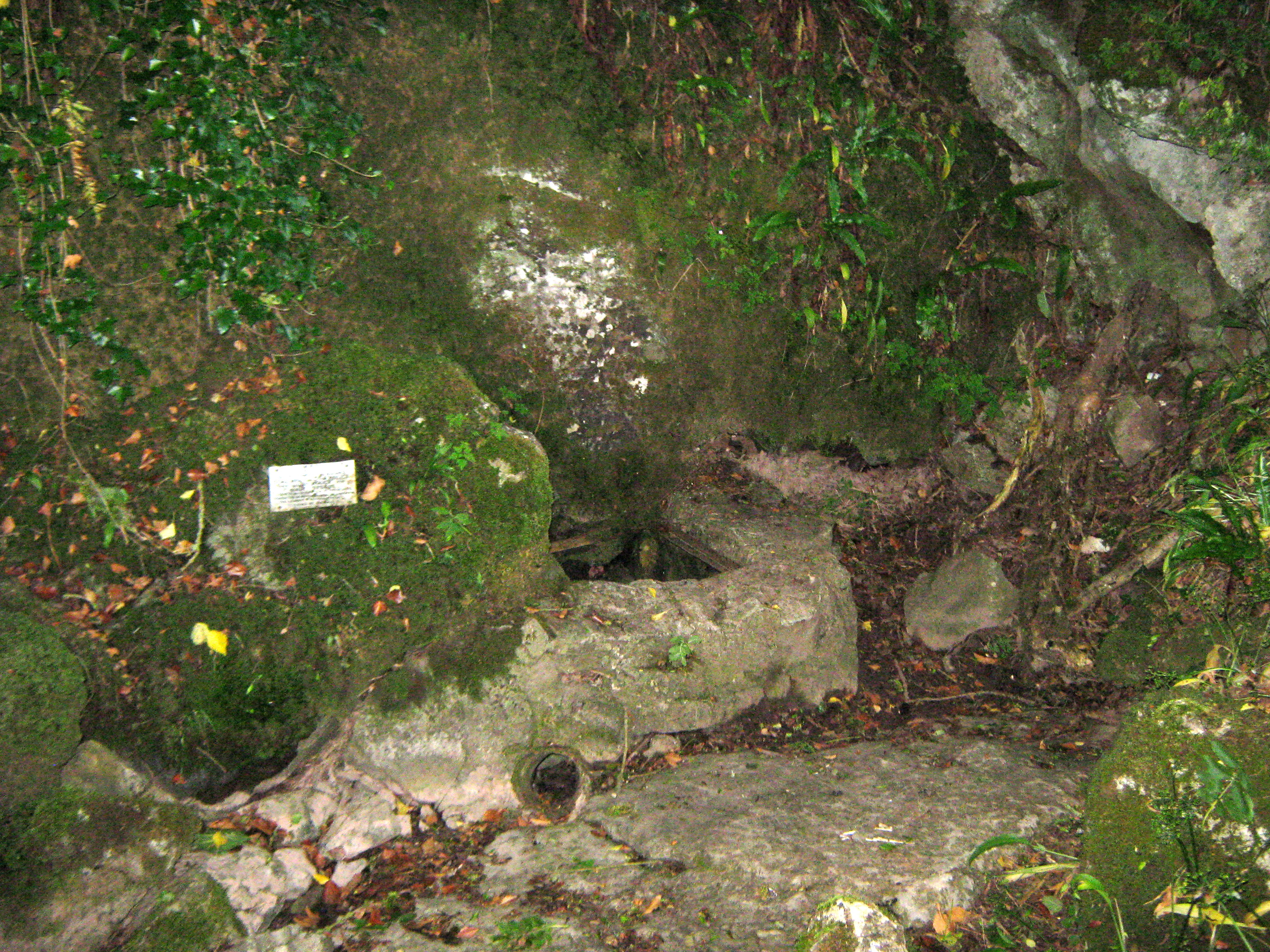
- Entrance (when dry)
- Interactive map of Stoke Lane Slocker
- Location: Stoke St Michael
- Depth: 30m
- Length: 2.18km
- Geology: Limestone
- Hazards: Weils Disease
- Cave survey: 1. Bracknell CC (overlay on map); 2. Geological Conservation Review/ WCC/CDG; 3. Mendip Cave Registry and Archive (1957)

Stoke Lane Slocker (grid reference ST66874745) is a cave near Stoke St Michael, in the Carboniferous Limestone of the Mendip Hills, in the English county of Somerset.

It is 2.18 km in length and reaches a depth of 30m.

It was previously known as Stoke Lane Swallet, but now the local name is preferred. The origin of the word "Slocker" is obscure, possibly from "slock" meaning to entice or lure away although the Gaelic word for swallow hole is "sluighaire".

== History ==
It is believed that the first person to explore the cave in modern times was a Mr Marshall from Stratton-on-the-Fosse around 1905, but major exploration and measurement of this cave really started in 1947 when Sump 1 was reached. That sump was passed the same year and the decorated chambers of Stoke Two discovered. Sumps 2 to 7 were passed over the course of the 1960s. The Bailey-Ward series of chambers was discovered in 1971.

Cases of Weils Disease have been reported in those who have been into the cave.

== Description ==
The submerged entrance to the cave lies near the disused Stoke Lane Quarry, and from it an underground stream emerges into daylight to feed a water-source known as St Dunstan's Well. The cave has been designated as a Site of Special Scientific Interest.

Stoke One (the length of passage between the entrance and Sump 1), is mainly made up of low passageways. However the Bailey-Ward Series of chambers includes Bernard's Rift, which is 20 metres (66 ft) high and contains crystal pools containing calcite-encrusted goniatite snail shells, and cave pearls.

The area between Sumps 1 and 2, Stoke 2, contains a number of highly decorated chambers including the Upper Grotto, Traverse Grotto and the Throne Room which contains a 3 metres (10 ft) high stalactite boss named The King and a second stalactite, 2 metres (7 ft) high, named The Queen after Queen Victoria. The once-spectacular formations in the Princess Grotto have suffered damage since the cave was discovered. When the Bone Chamber, which is not decorated, was found it contained a number of human and animal bones, along with ash and charcoal.

Beyond the second sump is a long stretch of passage containing a further six sumps.

Sump	Length of dive	Notes
Sump 1	18 inches (46 cm)	Free-divable
Sump 2	10 metres (33 ft)	Fully equipped divers only
Sump 3	?	Can be by-passed
Sump 4	20 metres (66 ft)	Fully equipped divers only
Sump 5	?	Can be by-passed
Sump 6	12 metres (39 ft)	
Sump 7	15 metres (49 ft)	Very tight
Sump 8	?	Boulder-choked; cannot be passed

== See also ==
- Caves of the Mendip Hills
