= Shepton Mallet Rural District =

Former local government area in the UK

Coordinates: 51.193°N 2.546°W

- Area
  - 1911: 46,561 acres (188.43 km^{2})
  - 1961: 47,193 acres (190.98 km^{2})
- Population
  - 1911: 10,183
  - 1961: 9,823
- History
  - Created: 1894
  - Abolished: 1974
- Status: Rural district
  - HQ: Shepton Mallet

Shepton Mallet was a rural district in Somerset, England, from 1894 to 1974.

It was created in 1894, under the Local Government Act 1894.

In 1974 it was abolished under the Local Government Act 1972 when it became part of the Mendip district.

The parishes which were part of the district included Ashwick, Batcombe, Binegar, Cranmore, Croscombe, Ditcheat, Doulting, Downhead, East Pennard, Emborough, Evercreech, Holcombe, Lamyat, Lydford-on-Fosse, Milton Clevedon, Pilton, Pylle, Stoke St Michael, Stratton on the Fosse and West Bradley.
