= Rodney Stoke =

Village and civil parish in Somerset, England

Coordinates: 51.2476°N 2.7357°W

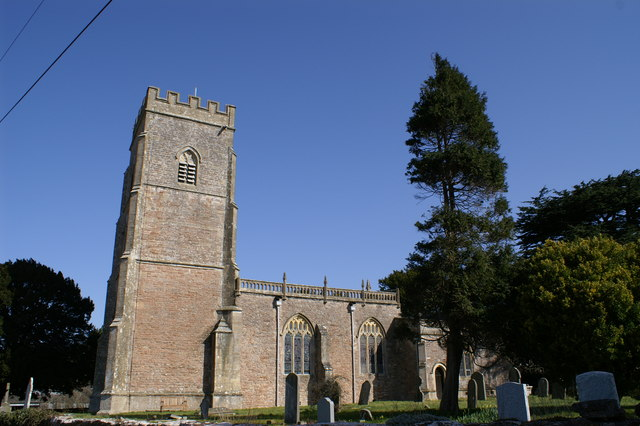
- Church of St Leonard, Rodney Stoke

- Location within Somerset
- Population: 1,326 (2011)
- OS grid reference: ST486501
- Civil parish: Rodney Stoke
- Unitary authority: Somerset Council
- Ceremonial county: Somerset
- Region: South West
- Country: England
- Sovereign state: United Kingdom
- Post town: CHEDDAR
- Postcode district: BS27
- Dialling code: 01749
- Police: Avon and Somerset
- Fire: Devon and Somerset
- Ambulance: South Western
- UK Parliament: Wells and Mendip Hills

Rodney Stoke is a small village and civil parish, located at grid reference ST486501, 5 miles north-west of Wells, in the English county of Somerset. The village is on the A371 between Draycott and Westbury-sub-Mendip.

The parish includes the larger village of Draycott. South of the A371 the parish includes an area of the Somerset Levels, extending to the River Axe. North of the A371 the southern slopes of the Mendip Hills rise to an area of the parish on the Mendip plateau. The parish is therefore an area of high biodiversity supporting local rare species of plants and animal life.

== History ==
Close to the village is Westbury Camp, which represents the remains of an Iron Age enclosed settlement and has been designated as a Scheduled Ancient Monument.

Rodney Stoke was listed in the Domesday Book of 1086 as Stoches, meaning 'a stockaded settlement' from the Old English stoc. In 1291 the place name was recorded as Stokgifford. The Giffords were Saxon nobility at the time of Edward the Confessor with Walter Gifford (then spelt Gifard) as the Earl of Buckingham.

The parish was part of the Winterstoke Hundred.

The village was the home of, and is probably named after, Sir John Rodney (d. 1400). However Ekwall indicates that Stoke Gifford was held by Richard de Rodene in 1303.

The first Baron Rodney was George Brydges Rodney (1718/19–92), a British naval admiral of Napoleonic times.

It is one of the nine Thankful Villages in Somerset which suffered no fatalities during World War I. There is a memorial window in the Parish Church together with a new plaque that testifies to the village's enduring pride in their good fortune. The village is also featured on Darren Hayman's album, Thankful Villages Volume 1.

== Governance ==
The parish council has responsibility for local issues, including setting an annual precept (local rate) to cover the council's operating costs and producing annual accounts for public scrutiny. The parish council evaluates local planning applications and works with the local police, district council officers, and neighbourhood watch groups on matters of crime, security, and traffic. The parish council's role also includes initiating projects for the maintenance and repair of parish facilities, as well as consulting with the district council on the maintenance, repair, and improvement of highways, drainage, footpaths, public transport, and street cleaning. Conservation matters (including trees and listed buildings) and environmental issues are also the responsibility of the council.

For local government purposes, since 1 April 2023, the parish comes under the unitary authority of Somerset Council. Prior to this, it was part of the non-metropolitan district of Mendip (established under the Local Government Act 1972). It was part of Wells Rural District before 1974.

The village is in the 'Rodney and Westbury' electoral ward. The ward starts in the north west at Draycott and passes through Rodney Stoke to end at Westbury-sub-Mendip. The total population of the ward as at the 2011 census was 2,127.

It is also part of the Wells and Mendip Hills county constituency represented in the House of Commons of the Parliament of the United Kingdom. It elects one Member of Parliament (MP) by the first past the post system of election.

== Geography ==
The land is noteworthy for its importance as a flight corridor and feeding ground for the Greater Horseshoe Bat. Cheddar Complex, a Site of Special Scientific Interest, lies to the north and Mascalls' Wood, an ancient woodland and Somerset Wildlife Trust Nature Reserve, lies to the west. The cross roads may be the site of an old Roman road.

Close to the village is the Rodney Stoke nature reserve, which is a Site of Special Scientific Interest (SSSI).

== Religious sites ==
The church of St Leonard, was built around 1175 and is a Grade I listed building. The interior of the church contains a screen, bearing the date 1624, the gift of Sir Edward Rodney, which includes a representation of the martyrdom of St Erasmus, who was killed by having his entrails removed.

== Notable residents ==
- Edward Rodney (1590–1657), MP for Wells and Somerset at various times between 1621 and 1642, lived in Rodney Stoke and was buried there.
- John Rodney (died 1400), MP for Somerset, 1391–1393, lived in Rodney Stoke.
- Frances Southwell (died 1659), courtier and wife of Edward Rodney, lived in Rodney Stoke.
- Thomas Tremlett (1834–1894), first-class cricketer, was born in Rodney Stoke.
