= Hundred of Whitstone =

Historical Hundred of Somerset, England

Whitstone Hundred
- Area
- 33,150 acres (13,420 ha)
- Status: Hundred
  - HQ: Shepton Mallet
- Subdivisions
  - Type: Parishes
  - Units: Batcombe, Croscombe, Ditcheat, Doulting, Downhead, Hornblotton, Lamyatt, East Pennard, Pilton, Pylle, Shepton Mallet, and Stoke Lane

The Hundred of Whitstone is one of the 40 historical Hundreds in the ceremonial county of Somerset, England, dating from before the Norman conquest during the Anglo-Saxon era although exact dates are unknown. Each hundred had a 'fyrd', which acted as the local defence force and a court which was responsible for the maintenance of the frankpledge system. They also formed a unit for the collection of taxes. The role of the hundred court was described in the Dooms (laws) of King Edgar. The name of the hundred was normally that of its meeting-place.

The Hundred of Whitstone consisted of the ancient parishes of: Batcombe, Croscombe, Ditcheat, Doulting, Downhead, Hornblotton, Lamyatt, East Pennard, Pilton, Pylle, Shepton Mallet, and Stoke Lane. It covered an area of 33,150 acres (13,420 ha).

The hundred courts were held at Cannard's Grave, a short distance to the south of the town of Shepton Mallet.

The importance of the hundred courts declined from the seventeenth century. By the 19th century several different single-purpose subdivisions of counties, such as poor law unions, sanitary districts, and highway districts sprang up, filling the administrative role previously played by parishes and hundreds. Although the Hundreds have never been formally abolished, their functions ended with the establishment of county courts in 1867 and the introduction of districts by the Local Government Act 1894.
