= Steve Voake =

English children's author

Steve Voake is a successful English children's author from Midsomer Norton, Somerset, whose books have sold all over the world.

He started his teaching career at Midsomer Norton County Primary school in the late 80's. In 2003 he was head teacher of a primary school in Kilmersdon, Somerset, when the BBC reported that he was being hailed as the next J. K. Rowling. A bidding war had broken out amongst publishers and film makers for the rights to his first novel, The Dreamwalker's Child. The publication deal he accepted with Faber and Faber enabled him to give up his teaching job to be a full-time writer, although the book has not been made into a film.

Since then he has published twenty three books. The novelist and critic Amanda Craig has regularly praised his work. The Times often includes his books in its recommended lists of top children's books. The School Library Association has included one of his novels in its list of recommended books for boys.

He also contributed to the Higher Ground Project, a book featuring leading children's authors that was published to raise awareness of the Boxing Day Tsunami.

On 22 March 2017, Voake was on Westminster Bridge, London, and witnessed the Westminster terrorist attack.

== Early life ==
Steve Voake grew up in Midsomer Norton. After leaving school he sold ice-creams in the south of France for a while. He obtained a BA (Hons) in Philosophy at the University of Liverpool, then qualified as a teacher at the University of Exeter.

== Career ==
He spent eight years as head teacher of Kilmersdon Primary School, near Midsomer Norton, Somerset. In his spare time he was writing his first children's book, The Dreamwalker's Child. In October 2003, while still working as a primary school head teacher, the BBC reported that he was "being hailed as the next JK Rowling" after the book gained interest from Hollywood and was "the subject of a furious bidding war between three UK publishers" and had "seen interest from book firms in Italy, Japan, Germany and the US".

In addition, film companies DreamWorks, Warner Brothers, Fox Broadcasting Company and Miramax all asked to see the book

The BBC, The Times and The Independent then reported in 2003 that he agreed a £91,000 deal with Faber and Faber for the UK rights to his book. In 2005, the book was published in the UK as well as Italy, Germany, Greece, Holland, Russia, Portugal and Japan. US rights were subsequently bought at auction for a six-figure sum.

In 2007 he collaborated with his cousin Charlotte Voake, the Nestle Smarties Book Prize-winning author of Pizza Kittens and Ginger, to write Insect Detective.

He is currently also Senior Lecturer in Writing for Young People at Bath Spa University. and a Royal Literary Fellow at the University of Exeter.

== Novels ==
- The Dreamwalker's Child (2005)
- The Web of Fire (2006)
- The Starlight Conspiracy (2007)
- Daisy Dawson (2007)
- Daisy Dawson and the Secret Pond (2008)
- Daisy Dawson and the Big Freeze (2009)
- Insect Detective (2009)
- Blood Hunters (2009)
- Fightback (2010)
- Hooey Higgins and the Shark (2010)
- Hooey Higgins and the Tremendous Trousers (2010)
- Hooey Higgins and the Big Boat Race (2011)
- "Dark Woods" (2011)
- "Daisy Dawson at the Seaside" (2011)
- "Daisy Dawson on the Farm" (2012)
- "Hooey Higgins Goes for Gold" (2012)
- "Hooey Higgins and the Big Day Out" (2012)
- "Hooey Higgins and the Awards of Awesomeness" (2013)
- "Hooey Higgins and the Storm" (2014)
- "Hooey Higgins and the Christmas Crash" (2014)
- "Maxwell Mutt and the Downtown Dogs" (2016)
- "Maxwell Mutt and the Squirrel without a Story" (2017)
- "Maxwell Mutt and the Biscuit & Bone Club" (2019)

== Award nominations ==
- The Dreamwalker's Child – shortlisted for Stockton Children's Book of the Year Award and Concorde Book Award
- The Starlight Conspiracy – shortlisted for Concorde Book Award
- Blood Hunters – selected for National 'Booked Up' Scheme 2009, Shortlisted for Manchester Book Award, Shortlisted for Leeds Book Award, shortlisted for Cheshire Schools Book Award
- The School Library Association included The Web of Fire in its list of "Top books for boys".
- Fightback – Won the Bolton book Award
- "Hooey Higgins and the Shark" awarded Outstanding International Book by United States Board of Books for Young People, 2013
- "Insect Detective" was awarded Best Illustrated Children's Non Fiction Book by the English Association (2009)
- 'My Brother Saves Things' longlisted for University of Canberra Vice-Chancellor's International Poetry Prize, 2016
- "Pencil" – Poems on the Buses Exhibition, Guernsey Literary Festival 2017
- "Three Telescopes" longlisted for Poetry Society's National Poetry Competition 2020

== Personal life ==
He lives with his family in Westbury-sub-Mendip, Somerset.

== Media coverage ==
=== UK national newspapers ===
The Times has published many favourable articles featuring Steve Voake or his books and frequently including them in their holiday specials of recommended books at Christmas or the summer holidays, Their critic, the novelist Amanda Craig in particular has recommended them,

The Guardian reported on Steve Voake's inclusion on the School Library Association List. The Observer favourably reviewed The Dreamwalker's Child". The Daily Telegraph has also reviewed his work, as has The Independent. The Times Educational Supplement covered Steve Voake's contribution to the Higher Ground Project, a book published to raise awareness of the Boxing Day Tsunami.

=== UK local newspapers ===
Many local newspapers have covered his work, including the Somerset Guardian Standard, the Bath Chronicle and the Worcester News.

=== Foreign periodicals ===
Abroad, there has been considerable newspaper coverage, including The Herald Journal, (Utah, United States), the Pittsburgh Post-Gazette, and in Fantasy Magazine in Italy.

=== Television and radio ===
CBBC featured an interview with Steve Voake in its Newsround programme.

BBC Somerset Sound has interviewed him on the radio. The BBC has regularly reported on Steve Voake in its news pages on its website.

== Literary festivals ==
He is now a regular on the book festival circuit and has been invited to speak at literary festivals including Cheltenham, Frome, Bath, Somerset, Edinburgh, Aberdeen and Guildford.
