= Thomas Tremlett =

English cricketer

Personal information
- Full name: Thomas Daniel Tremlett
- Born: 14 February 1834; Rodney Stoke, Somerset, England
- Died: 22 January 1894 (aged 59); Harrow, Middlesex, England
- Batting: Unknown
- Bowling: Unknown
- Relatives: Erroll Tremlett (nephew)

Domestic team information
- Years: Team
- 1853–1854: Cambridge University

Career statistics
| Competition | First-class |
|---|---|
| Matches | 4 |
| Runs scored | 70 |
| Batting average | 10.00 |
| 100s/50s | –/– |
| Top score | 28 |
| Balls bowled | ? |
| Wickets | 1 |
| Bowling average | – |
| 5 wickets in innings | – |
| 10 wickets in match | – |
| Best bowling | 1/? |
| Catches/stumpings | –/– |
- Source: Cricinfo, 26 January 2023

Thomas Daniel Tremlett (14 February 1834 – 22 January 1894) was an English cricketer who played first-class cricket in four matches for Cambridge University in 1853 and 1854. He was born at Rodney Stoke in Somerset and died at Harrow, Middlesex.

Tremlett was educated at Eton College and at King's College, Cambridge. He played cricket at Eton and featured in the annual Eton v Harrow match in three seasons from 1850 to 1852. In these games, and then later at Cambridge, he batted anywhere in the batting order from opening the innings to being the No 11, and he also took wickets; however, there is no record of whether he batted right- or left-handed or of his bowling style. His best score in his four first-class games came in his first match: an innings of 28 against the Marylebone Cricket Club. In 1854, his three matches included the University Match against Oxford University, and he is therefore recorded as having achieved a Blue. The game was his final first-class appearance.

Tremlett graduated from Cambridge University with a Bachelor of Arts degree in 1857, and this was automatically converted to a Master of Arts in 1860. He became a Fellow of King's College until he disqualified himself by marrying in 1873; he also became a lawyer at Lincoln's Inn and was called to the bar in 1861.
