= William Gould (naturalist) =

English cleric and naturalist (1715–1799)

The Rev. William Gould A. M. (1715 – 16 March 1799) was an English cleric and naturalist. He was described by Horace Donisthorpe as "the father of British myrmecology", the branch of entomology dealing with ants.

== Life and career ==
Gould was born at Sharpham Park, Glastonbury, Somerset, son of Davidge Gould, and educated at Exeter College, Oxford, where he matriculated in 1732, aged 17; he gained his B. A. in 1736.

He was afterwards Rector of Stapleford Abbotts in Essex. In May 1774 he was elected a Fellow of the Royal Society

== An Account of English Ants ==
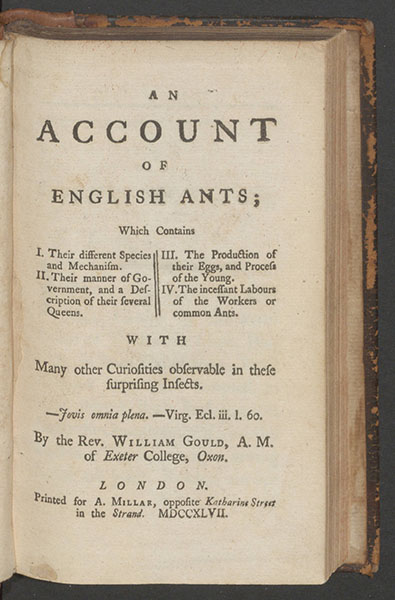
Title page of An Account of English Ants

He is most famous for his book, An Account of English Ants, published in London by Andrew Millar in 1747. It was the first scientific paper written on ants, with 109 pages, and brought together all previous observation into a single volume. When it was published it was quite controversial, since Gould, albeit reluctantly, conceded that his observations directly contradicted the Bible, specifically Proverbs 6:6-8, where it was written:

"Go to the ant, thou sluggard; consider her ways and be wise; which having no chief, overseer, or ruler, provideth her bread in the summer, and gathereth her food in the harvest."

Gould, however, correctly stated that there was no evidence at all to suggest that any of the British ant species he knew hoarded grain. It is often said he faced criticism from the established church for this, but the story may be apocryphal.

His book remains an important early record in ant observation and the science of myrmecology, even though he only recognised a handful of species, which he categorized as "hill ants", "jet ants", "red ants", "common yellow ants", and "small black ants".

His work is divided into four chapters:

- Their different Species and Mechanism
- Their manner of Government, and a Description of their several Queens
- The Production of their Eggs, and Process of the Young
- The incessant Labours of the Workers or common Ants
