= Church of St Mary and St John, Lamyat =

Church in Somerset, England

Church of St Mary and St John
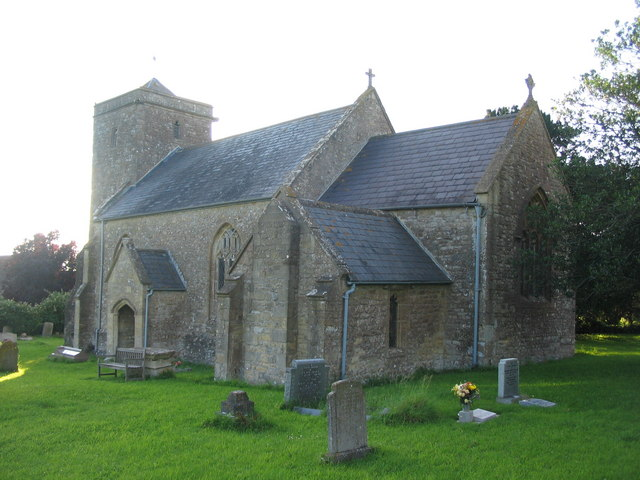

- Location within Somerset
- 51°07′26″N 2°29′07″W
- Location: Lamyatt, Somerset, England

History
- Built: 13th century

Listed Building – Grade II*
- Designated: 25 February 1988
- Reference no.: 1174955

The Anglican Church Of St Mary and St John in Lamyatt, within the English county of Somerset, was built in the 13th century. It is a Grade II* listed building.

From the 12th century until the Dissolution of the Monasteries the advowson of the church was held by Godstow nunnery.

The fabric of the building has been changed and renovated many times, however the two-stage 13th-century tower remains.

The stained glass window depicting St Christopher carrying the Christ child was donated by Christopher Welch in 1907.

The parish is part of the Bruton and District Team Ministry within the Diocese of Bath and Wells.

== See also ==
- List of ecclesiastical parishes in the Diocese of Bath and Wells
