= Frome Rural District =

Former district of Somerset, England

Coordinates: 51.228°N 2.322°W

- Area
  - 1911: 51,558 acres (208.65 km^{2})
  - 1961: 51,936 acres (210.18 km^{2})
- Population
  - 1911: 11,171
  - 1961: 10,861
- History
  - Created: 1894
  - Abolished: 1974
- Status: Rural district

Frome was a rural district in Somerset, England, from 1894 to 1974.

The district was created in 1894 under the Local Government Act 1894. It was abolished in 1974 under the Local Government Act 1972 when it became part of the district of Mendip.

The parishes which were part of the district included Beckington, Berkley, Buckland Dinham, Coleford, Frome, Great Elm, Hemington, Kilmersdon, Leigh on Mendip, Lullington, Mells, Norton St Philip, Nunney, Rode, Selwood, Tellisford, Trudoxhill, Upton Noble, Wanstrow, Whatley and Witham Friary.
