= Sharpham Moor Plot =

- Site of Special Scientific Interest
- Location within Somerset
- Location of Sharpham Moor Plot.
- Area of search: Somerset
- Grid reference: ST465389
- Coordinates: 51.14685°N 2.76622°W
- Interest: Biological
- Area: 0.5 hectares (0.0050 km^{2}; 0.0019 sq mi)
- Notification date: 1967

Sharpham Moor Plot (grid reference ST465389) is a 0.5-hectare (1.3 acre) biological Site of Special Scientific Interest at Sharpham in Somerset, UK, notified in 1967.

Sharpham Moor Plot is an area, predominantly of secondary woodland, on Turbary Moor Series Peat within the Somerset Moors managed by the Somerset Wildlife Trust. It has considerable value for its research and historic interest. The research value of the plot lies in its being the site of one of the best documented examples of natural succession. Detailed plant records exist from as far back as 1915, and continue up to the present day.
