= Church of St Mary Magdalene, Upton Noble =

Church in Somerset, England

Church of St Mary Magdalene
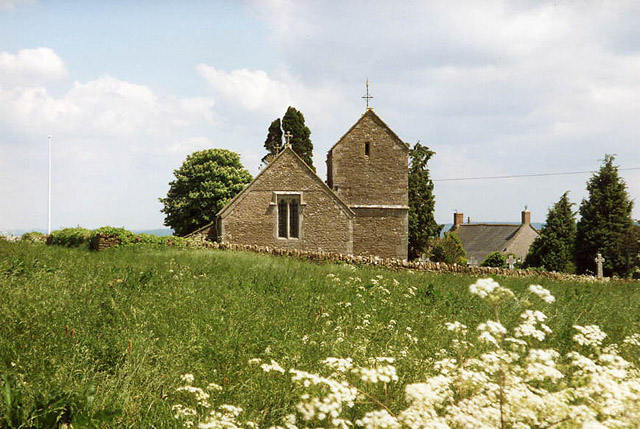

- Location within Somerset
- 51°09′26″N 2°24′43″W
- Location: Upton Noble, Somerset, England

History
- Built: 12th century

Listed Building – Grade II*
- Designated: 11 March 1968
- Reference no.: 1174889

The Anglican Church Of St Mary and St John in Upton Noble, within the English county of Somerset, was built in the 12th century. It is a Grade II* listed building.

The church was a chapelry of Batcombe which, until the Dissolution of the Monasteries was controlled by Glastonbury Abbey.

The south door is Norman. The church was altered in the 16th century and underwent Victorian restoration in the 1870s which included lengthening the nave and chancel.

The parish is part of the Bruton and District Team Ministry benefice within the Diocese of Bath and Wells.

== See also ==
- List of ecclesiastical parishes in the Diocese of Bath and Wells
