= The Dreamwalker's Child =

Book by Steve Voake

- First edition (publ. Faber & Faber)
- Author: Steve Voake
- Genre: Children's literature; Fantasy
- Publisher: Faber Children's Books
- Publication date: 2005

The Dreamwalker's Child is a children's fantasy novel by Steve Voake. It was his debut novel and was published in 2005 by Faber Children's Books. It was shortlisted for the Stockton Children's Book of the Year. It is 300 pages long.

== Plot summary ==
Sam Palmer has always been fascinated with insects, but now he has become obsessed. Suddenly insects also appear to be fascinated with Sam. Wherever he goes, a few wasps follow him. One day he finds a horse-fly in his room. He gently corrals it in a glass and sets it free, informing it that it is not very smart. But that fly knows more than Sam could ever imagine.

Meanwhile, an army in the state of Vermia in another world called Aurobon prepares for war against humans on earth. Their weapon: a virus to be spread by mosquitoes. As they refine their technique, word comes that "the Dreamwalker" has been found—and that she has a son. Odoursin, Vermia's evil emperor, demands the boy be brought to him.

Sam takes a bike ride and notices a peculiar cloud of wasps. He cannot resist following them. Pain stabs his neck, and then everything goes black.

He awakens to nighttime in a strange landscape, marshlands lit with blue-green light. Confused and frightened, he walks toward distant city lights. But his travels are disrupted by a horrendous encounter with a slavering pack of creatures like no one has seen on Earth. The crazed beasts are intent on killing him. Sam realizes he will surely die, but then a group of soldiers appears. His relief is short-lived, however, when the soldiers act like he is a criminal, violently hauling him off to prison. What is going on?

Vermia's enemy state is called Vahlzi, and the army is led by Commander Firebrand. Realizing the Dreamwalker's son has been kidnapped by Vermia, Firebrand decides to send a rescuer, Skipper, who is his best pilot despite her young age.

In prison, Sam meets Skipper who gives him hope of escape. Looking through the window of his cell, he sees three moons and realizes he is in a whole new world. When Sam learns the truth behind his plight, he is shocked. He must fight the evil that seeks to destroy Earth's humans. Meanwhile, his damaged body on Earth remains in a coma.

== Reception ==
The Times called The Dreamwalker's Child "an ingenious and faced-paced thriller", while Kirkus Reviews referred to it as "an immensely enjoyable read". Teen Reads gave the novel "5 stars", highlighting its "thrilling and original plot". Book Browse wrote, "Steve Voake is a great writer who knows his target audience well. I strongly suggest you take a close look at this one if you have any reason to be buying or recommending books for children, especially if you're looking for that rare literary beast - a book with a strong female lead that can appeal to both boys and girls, 2 thumbs up."

== Sequel ==
The sequel and final book in the series of two is The Web of Fire, published in 2006. Set four years after the first book, the novel returns Sam to Aurobon where he and Skipper fight against Odoursin's vicious insect army and learn of a plot to destroy humankind using the President of the United States as a pawn.
