= Upton Noble =

Village and civil parish in Somerset, England

Coordinates: 51.15404°N 2.40888°W

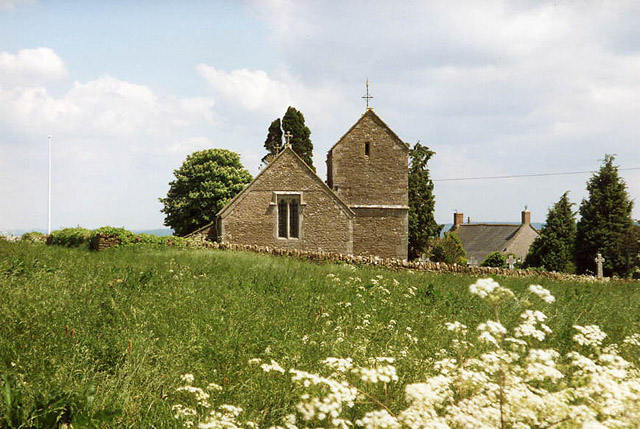
- Church of St Mary Magdalene

- Location within Somerset
- Population: 128 (2011)
- OS grid reference: ST715395
- Unitary authority: Somerset Council
- Ceremonial county: Somerset
- Region: South West
- Country: England
- Sovereign state: United Kingdom
- Post town: SHEPTON MALLET
- Postcode district: BA4
- Dialling code: 01749
- Police: Avon and Somerset
- Fire: Devon and Somerset
- Ambulance: South Western
- UK Parliament: Frome and East Somerset

Upton Noble is a village and civil parish on the River Frome. It is roughly 4.5 miles (7 km) north-east of Bruton, and 7 miles (11 km) from Frome town centre, in the Mendip district of Somerset, England.

There was a 17th-century village pub called The Lamb Inn (now closed), a village hall, a primary school, a church, a post office and a garage.

== History ==
The parish was also known as Upton Caboche in the 14th century.

The first part of the name means the upper settlement, the second part is from the family of Sir John le Noble who held the manor in the 13th century.

== Governance ==
The parish council has responsibility for local issues, including setting an annual precept (local rate) to cover the council's operating costs and producing annual accounts for public scrutiny. The parish council evaluates local planning applications and works with the local police, district council officers, and neighbourhood watch groups on matters of crime, security, and traffic. The parish council's role also includes initiating projects for the maintenance and repair of parish facilities, as well as consulting with the district council on the maintenance, repair, and improvement of highways, drainage, footpaths, public transport, and street cleaning. Conservation matters (including trees and listed buildings) and environmental issues are also the responsibility of the council.

For local government purposes, since 1 April 2023, the village comes under the unitary authority of Somerset Council. Prior to this, it was part of the non-metropolitan district of Mendip, which was formed on 1 April 1974 under the Local Government Act 1972, having previously been part of Frome Rural District.

It is also part of the Frome and East Somerset county constituency represented in the House of Commons of the Parliament of the United Kingdom. It elects one Member of Parliament (MP) by the first past the post system of election.

== Religious sites ==
The Church of St Mary Magdalene dates from the 12th century and is a Grade II* listed building. The church was a chapelry to Batcombe.

== School ==
Upton Noble C of E VC Primary School celebrated its 50-year anniversary in 2015. It received 'Good' inspection in its 2019 Ofsted report.

== Events ==
The Upton Noble Beer & Cider Festival has been held each September since 2014, with around 1,000 people attending the event in 2017.

Upton Noble has a calendar of events throughout the year and you can hire the village hall for your own activities.
