= Lamyatt =

Village and civil parish in Somerset, England

Coordinates: 51.1189°N 2.4928°W

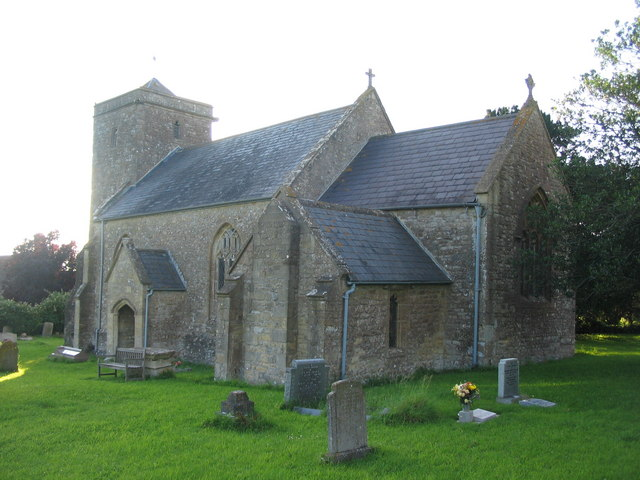
- Church of St Mary and St John, Lamyat

- Location within Somerset
- Population: 183 (2011)
- OS grid reference: ST656356
- Civil parish: Lamyatt
- Unitary authority: Somerset Council
- Ceremonial county: Somerset
- Region: South West
- Country: England
- Sovereign state: United Kingdom
- Post town: SHEPTON MALLET
- Postcode district: BA4
- Dialling code: 01749
- Police: Avon and Somerset
- Fire: Devon and Somerset
- Ambulance: South Western
- UK Parliament: Frome and East Somerset

Lamyatt is a village and civil parish in the county of Somerset, England. It lies 5 miles (8 km) south east of Shepton Mallet, 2 miles (3 km) north east of Castle Cary, and 3 miles (5 km) south of Evercreech. The parish has a population of 183.

== History ==
A square, Roman-period Celtic temple built in the late 3rd century, is situated a mile north-west of the parish on the summit of Lamyatt Beacon. It fell into disuse at the end of the Roman period and a small east–west building was constructed nearby. A small cemetery was radiocarbon dated to the early Middle Ages.

Lamyatt was recorded in the Domesday Book as Lamieta meaning "the lamb's gate" from the Old English lamb and goat. The Abbot of Glastonbury Abbey owned the land and 5 hides (660 acres) were sublet to Nigel the Doctor.

The parish of Lamyatt was part of the Whitstone Hundred.

== Governance ==
The parish council has responsibility for local issues, including setting an annual precept (local rate) to cover the council's operating costs and producing annual accounts for public scrutiny. The parish council evaluates local planning applications and works with the local police, district council officers, and neighbourhood watch groups on matters of crime, security, and traffic. The parish council's role also includes initiating projects for the maintenance and repair of parish facilities, as well as consulting with the district council on the maintenance, repair, and improvement of highways, drainage, footpaths, public transport, and street cleaning. Conservation matters (including trees and listed buildings) and environmental issues are also the responsibility of the council.

For local government purposes, since 1 April 2023, the parish comes under the unitary authority of Somerset Council. Prior to this, it was part of the non-metropolitan district of Mendip (established under the Local Government Act 1972). It was part of Shepton Mallet Rural District before 1974.

It is also part of the Frome and East Somerset county constituency represented in the House of Commons of the Parliament of the United Kingdom. It elects one member of parliament (MP) by the first past the post system of election.

== Religious sites ==
St Mary and St John Church dates from the 13th century, and has been designated by English Heritage as a grade II* listed building.

== Notable people ==
- John Copleston (1841–1918), cricketer and clergyman
