= Downhead =

Village and civil parish in Somerset, England

Coordinates: 51.212°N 2.444°W

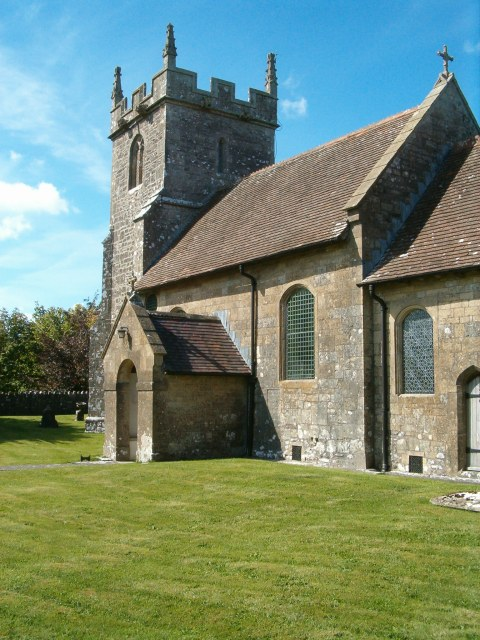
- Parish church

- Location within Somerset
- Population: 88 (in 2011)
- OS grid reference: ST691459
- Unitary authority: Somerset Council
- Ceremonial county: Somerset
- Region: South West
- Country: England
- Sovereign state: United Kingdom
- Post town: SHEPTON MALLET
- Postcode district: BA4
- Dialling code: 01749
- Police: Avon and Somerset
- Fire: Devon and Somerset
- Ambulance: South Western
- UK Parliament: Frome and East Somerset

Downhead is a village and civil parish just south of Leigh-on-Mendip and 5 miles (8 km) north east of Shepton Mallet, in the county of Somerset, England. The parish includes the hamlet of Tadhill.

== History ==
South west of the village is Dinies Camp, a univallate Iron Age hill fort enclosure. The hill fort is considered to be medieval as it is on the site of earlier earthworks.

The parish of Downhead was part of the Whitstone Hundred.

The village was recorded as Dunehevede, meaning the top of the down, in 1196. The manor was given to Glastonbury Abbey by King Æthelwulf of Wessex, but by 1066 was held under the abbey by Erneis. By the early 18th century the estate was held by the Portmans of Orchard Portman.

One source states that Tadhill or Toad Hill was a medieval settlement.

Downhead Basalt Quarry, to the west of the village, opened before 1904 and ceased basalt mining in 1925. It was serviced by a 2 ft (610 mm) narrow-gauge railway.

== Governance ==
The parish council has responsibility for local issues, including setting an annual precept (local rate) to cover the council's operating costs and producing annual accounts for public scrutiny. The parish council evaluates local planning applications and works with the local police, district council officers, and neighbourhood watch groups on matters of crime, security, and traffic. The parish council's role also includes initiating projects for the maintenance and repair of parish facilities, as well as consulting with the district council on the maintenance, repair, and improvement of highways, drainage, footpaths, public transport, and street cleaning. Conservation matters (including trees and listed buildings) and environmental issues are also of interest to the parish council.

The parish is in the area of Somerset Council, a unitary authority, which is responsible for all other local government matters. It was previously part of Shepton Mallet Rural District and then, from 1974 until 2023, the non-metropolitan district of Mendip.

It is also part of the Frome and East Somerset county constituency represented in the House of Commons of the Parliament of the United Kingdom.

== Geography ==
Downhead is close to the Asham Wood biological Site of Special Scientific Interest which is the largest and most diverse of the ancient semi-natural woods in the Mendip Hills. It has been the subject of controversy and attempts to protect the environment from increased quarrying activity in the area, particularly at Torr Works which is also known as Merehead Quarry. The wood occupies two deep valleys and the intervening plateau. Most of the underlying rocks are calcareous Carboniferous Limestone and shales, but Devonian Portishead Beds outcrop along the northern valley. There is a range of unusual flora and fauna.

== Religious sites ==
All Saints church is a Grade II* listed building with a 14th-century tower and 18th-century nave and chancel. The church tower contains three bells cast in 1782 by William Bilbie of Chew Stoke. In 2007, funding from the levy on nearby quarries was obtained to pay for repair and restoration of the bells.
