= Westbury-sub-Mendip =

Village and civil parish in Somerset, England

Coordinates: 51.2361°N 2.7141°W

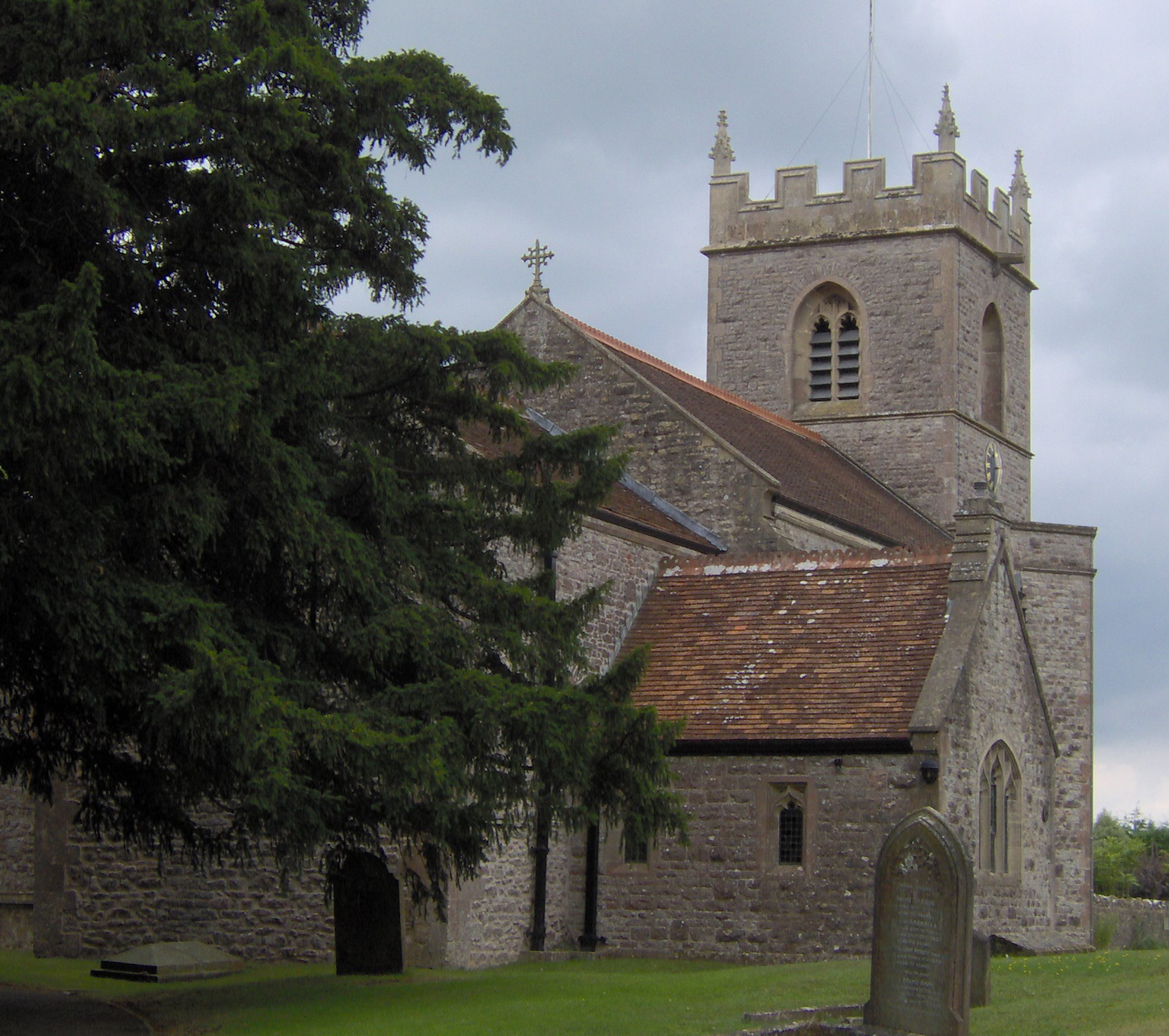
- Church of St Lawrence at Westbury

- Location within Somerset
- Population: 801 (2011 Census)
- OS grid reference: ST501488
- Civil parish: Westbury-sub-Mendip
- Unitary authority: Somerset Council
- Ceremonial county: Somerset
- Region: South West
- Country: England
- Sovereign state: United Kingdom
- Post town: WELLS
- Postcode district: BA5
- Dialling code: 01749
- Police: Avon and Somerset
- Fire: Devon and Somerset
- Ambulance: South Western
- UK Parliament: Wells and Mendip Hills
- Website: Westbury-sub-Mendip Parish Council

Westbury-sub-Mendip is a village and civil parish in Somerset, England. The village is on the southern slopes of the Mendip Hills, 4 miles (6.4 km) from Wells and Cheddar.

The parish boundary is formed by the River Axe.

== History ==
There is evidence, from flint finds, of occupation of a site, known as Westbury Sleight during the Mesolithic period, which fieldwork during 2007 suggested was a platform cairn with field banks of Bronze Age date. In 1969 traces of an infilled cave were discovered in a limestone quarry which produced numerous bones from extinct animals and flakes of flint and chert.

Westbury-sub-Mendip was listed in the Domesday Book of 1086 as Westberie, meaning 'The west hill under the Mendip Hills' from the Old English west and beorg. It was the property of Gisa, Bishop of Wells. However given the etymology quoted by Ekwall a more likely meaning is 'fortified enclosure west (of Wells)'. The 'fortification' may have been the Iron Age fort above the neighbouring village of Rodney Stoke; or the sub-circular enclosure around a British church or monastery; or around the lord of the manor's hall, now Court House Farm.

The parish was part of the hundred of Wells Forum.

The village cross is a 1.9 metres (6 ft 3 in) high shaft on a six step octagonal base.

The village once had a railway station on the Cheddar Valley line, also known as the Strawberry Line. The station, known as Lodge Hill, apparently to avoid confusion with Westbury in Wiltshire, is now an industrial estate providing employment for the village. Until recently the former railway line was an airfield for light aircraft.

The village has a number of amenities including a primary school, parish church, post office and pub. Social events include the annual Club Day on Spring Bank Holiday Monday. This involves a parade through the village led by a brass band. The event is organised by The Westbury Friendly Society, which is one of the five surviving Friendly Societies in Somerset. The church of St Lawrence at Westbury was given to the Augustinian canons of Bruton Priory by Robert, Bishop of Bath, in the 12th century. It is a Grade II* listed building.

Westbury-sub-Mendip won the title of Somerset Village of the Year 2006.

During 2009 a K6 Red telephone box in the village was converted into a library or book exchange replacing the services of the mobile library which no longer visits the village.

== Governance ==
The parish council has responsibility for local issues, including setting an annual precept (local rate) to cover the council’s operating costs and producing annual accounts for public scrutiny. The parish council evaluates local planning applications and works with the local police, district council officers, and neighbourhood watch groups on matters of crime, security, and traffic. The parish council's role also includes initiating projects for the maintenance and repair of parish facilities, as well as consulting with the district council on the maintenance, repair, and improvement of highways, drainage, footpaths, public transport, and street cleaning. Conservation matters (including trees and listed buildings) and environmental issues are also the responsibility of the council.

For local government purposes, the village falls within the Somerset Council unitary authority area, which was created on 1 April 2023. From 1894 to 31 March 1974, the village was part of Wells Rural District, and from 1 April 1974 to 31 March 2023, it was part of the non-metropolitan district of Mendip.

Westbury-sub-Mendip falls within the county constituency of Wells and Mendip Hills, which has been represented in the House of Commons of the Parliament of the United Kingdom by Tessa Munt of the Liberal Democrats since 2024.

== Religious sites ==
The Church of St Lawrence was built in the 12th century. It is a Grade II* listed building.

== Notable residents ==
- David Heath (born 1954), optometrist and politician who sat in the House of Commons from 1997 to 2015, was born in Westbury-sub-Mendip.
- James Lance, actor, grew up in Westbury-sub-Mendip.
- Steve Voake, successful children's author, lives in Westbury-sub-Mendip.
