= St Dunstan's Church, Baltonsborough =

Church in Somerset, England

Church of St Dunstan
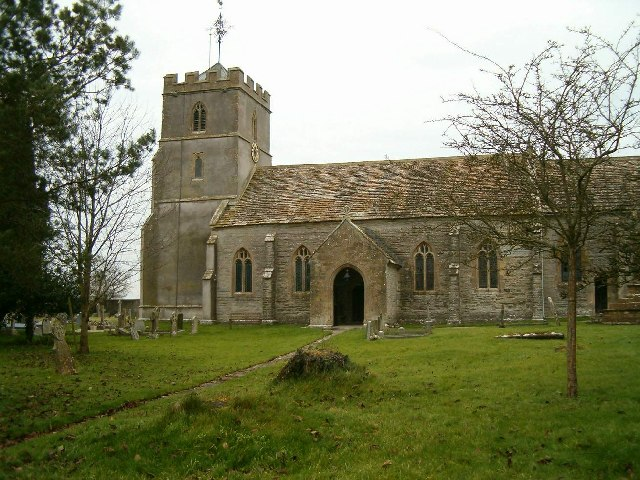

- Location within Somerset

General information
- Location: Baltonsborough, England
- Coordinates: 51.1105°N 2.6562°W
- Completed: 15th century

The Church of St Dunstan in Baltonsborough, Somerset, England, was built in the 15th century. It has been designated as a Grade I listed building.

The dedication honours St Dunstan who was born in Baltonsborough in 909, and eventually became Archbishop of Canterbury and an important monastic reformer of the Anglo-Saxon period. Legends attached to Dunstan portray him nailing a horseshoe onto the devil, earning him a place as a patron saint of blacksmiths.

There is a four bay nave and two bay chancel. The nave is particularly wide and has caused stress in the roof and an outward lean in the north wall. The church's simple Somerset tower is topped by an elaborate ironwork weather vane crafted by the local blacksmith in the 19th century. The interior includes a 15th-century font. The screen was designed by Frederick Bligh Bond.

The churchyard contains war graves of a Somerset Light Infantry soldier of World War I and a Royal Navy sailor of World War II.

The parish is part of the benefice of Baltonsborough with Butleigh, West Bradley and West Pennard, which is known as the Brue Benefice.

One former vicar of the church was Edward Mellish who was awarded the Victoria Cross in World War I.

== See also ==
- Grade I listed buildings in Mendip
- List of Somerset towers
- List of ecclesiastical parishes in the Diocese of Bath and Wells
