= Church of St Lawrence, Westbury-sub-Mendip =

Church in Somerset, England

Church of St Lawrence
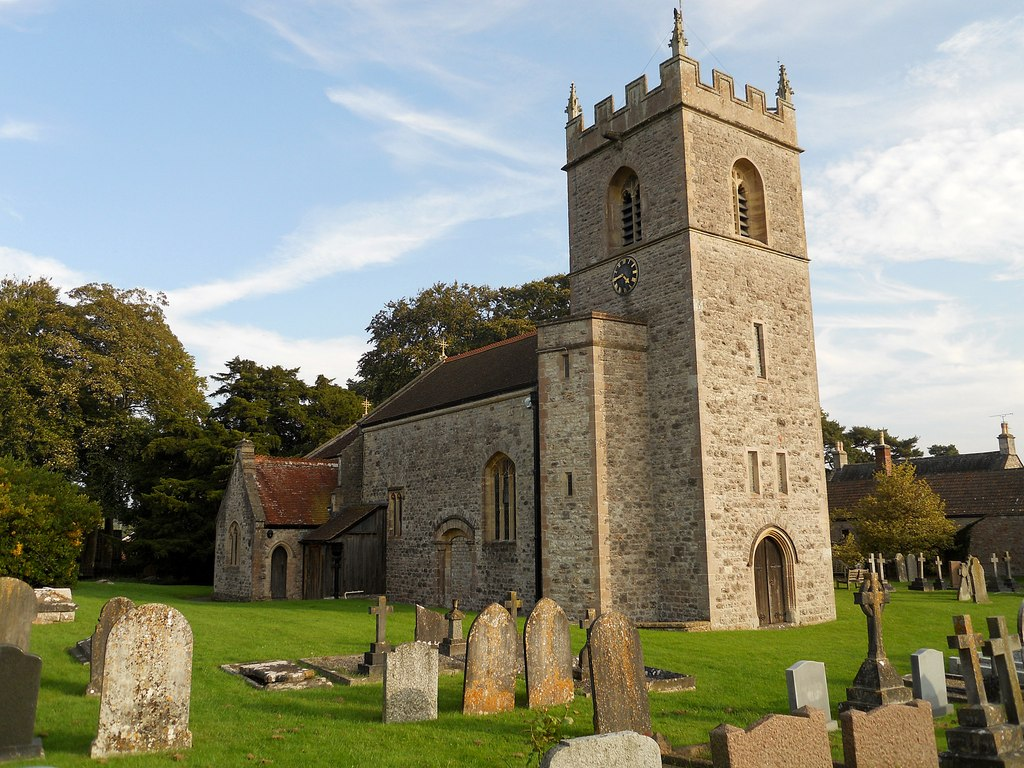

- Location within Somerset
- 51.2353°N 2.7182°W
- Location: Westbury-sub-Mendip, Somerset, England

History
- Built: 12th century

Listed Building – Grade II*
- Official name: Church of St Lawrence
- Designated: 22 November 1966
- Reference no.: 1178326

The Church of St Lawrence in Westbury-sub-Mendip, Somerset, England was built in the 12th century. It is a Grade II* listed building.

== History ==
The church was built in the 12th century and then changed in the 13th and 15th centuries before a major Victorian restoration in 1887, when the tower was completely rebuilt.

In 2012 a small kitchen was installed in the church. Also in 2012 an antique table and chest were stolen from the church.

The benefice of Westbury-sub-Mendip with Easton is part of the Diocese of Bath and Wells.

== Architecture ==
The stone building consists of a nave and chancel each of three bays, with an aisle, transept and porch on the south side. The organ chamber and vestry are on the north. The two-stage unbuttressed west tower has a small perpendicular stair turret.

Some of the fitting inside the church are from the 13th century including the piscina and font.

== See also ==
- List of ecclesiastical parishes in the Diocese of Bath and Wells
