= Asham Wood =

Woodland in Somerset, England

- Site of Special Scientific Interest
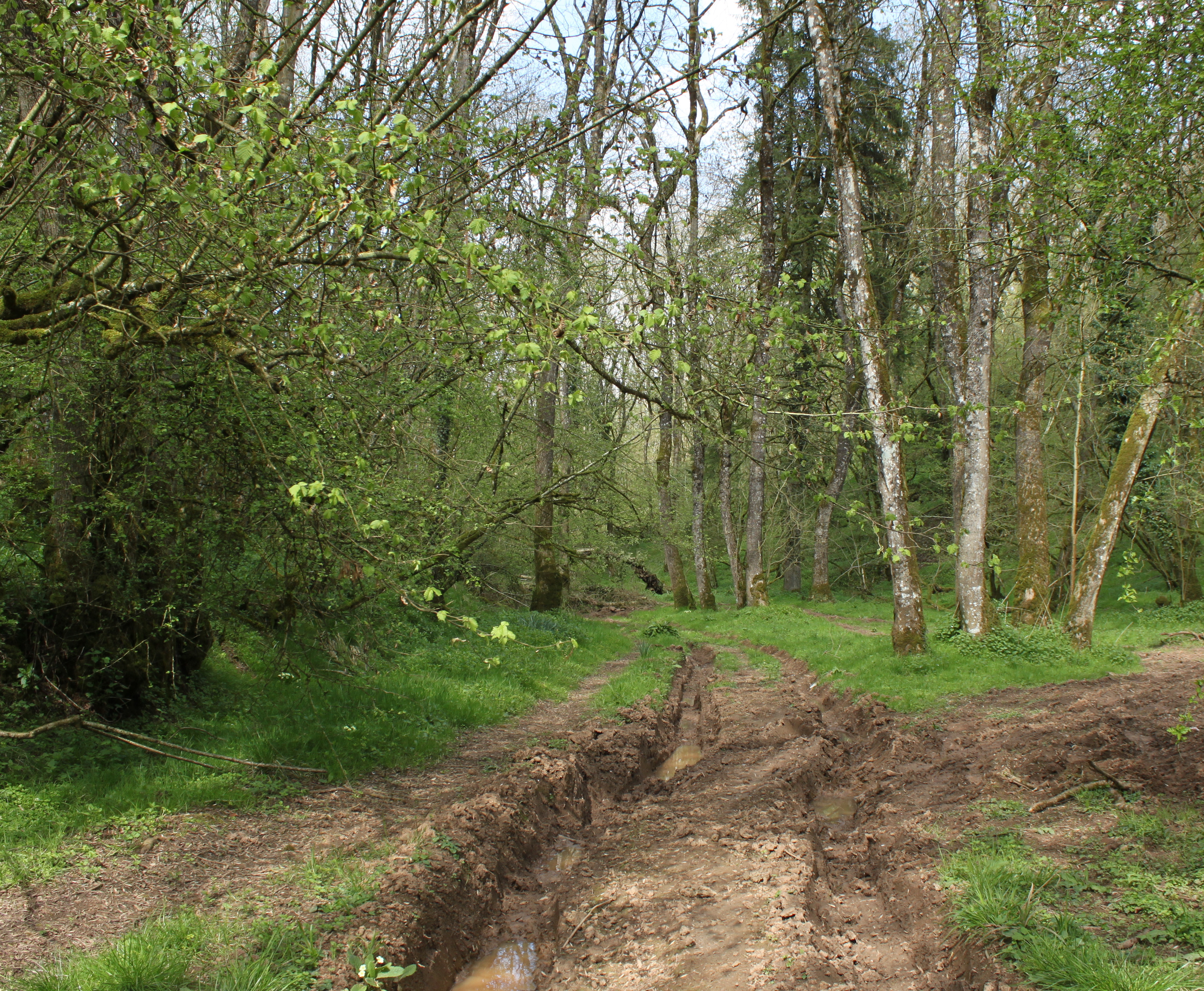

- Location within Somerset
- Location of Asham Wood.
- Area of search: Somerset
- Grid reference: ST705460
- Coordinates: 51.21244°N 2.42371°W
- Interest: Biological
- Area: 140.6 ha (347 acres)
- Notification date: 1963

Asham Wood (grid reference ST705460) is a 140.6-hectare (347-acre) biological Site of Special Scientific Interest east of Downhead and south of Leigh-on-Mendip in the Mendip Hills, Somerset, notified in 1963.

Asham Wood is the largest and most diverse of the ancient semi-natural woodlands in the Mendips. It has a permanent stream that runs through it feeding Chantry Pond to the east of the wood. It has been the subject of controversy and attempts to protect the environment from increased quarrying activity in the area.

The woodland occupies 2 deep valleys and the intervening plateau. Most of the underlying rocks are calcareous Carboniferous Limestone and Shales, but Devonian Portishead Beds outcrop along the northern valley. There are a range of unusual flora and fauna.

At Asham Wood near Frome coppicing and 50 dormouse boxes have been introduced in order to encourage nesting. The boxes are monitored and dormice numbers are recorded.
