= Rodney Stoke SSSI =

Site of Special Scientific Interest in the Mendip Hills, Somerset

Rodney Stoke
- Site of Special Scientific Interest
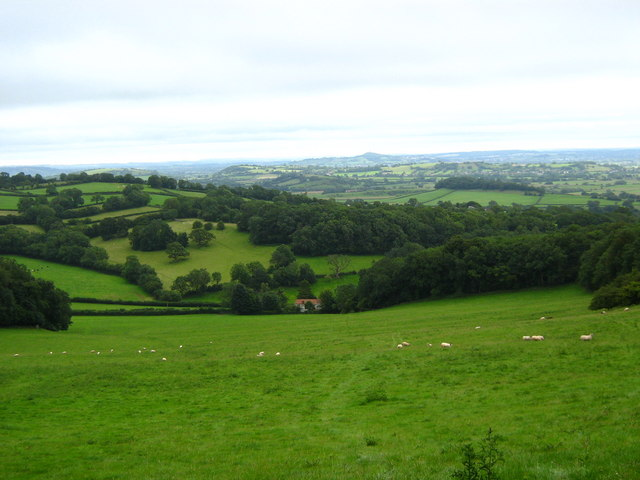

- Location within Somerset
- Location of Rodney Stoke.
- Area of search: Somerset
- Grid reference: ST492507
- Coordinates: 51.25319°N 2.72930°W
- Interest: Biological
- Area: 69.6 hectares (0.696 km^{2}; 0.269 sq mi)
- Notification date: 1957

Rodney Stoke (grid reference ST492507) is a 69.6 hectare (172.0 acre) biological Site of Special Scientific Interest, just north of the village of Rodney Stoke in the Mendip Hills, Somerset, notified in 1957.

Part of the site is a national nature reserve and part a Nature Conservation Review Woodland site. This site supports a mosaic of ancient semi-natural broadleaved woodland, scrub and species-rich unimproved grassland. Rodney Stoke occupies steep south west facing slopes of the Mendip Hills. The underlying rock types belong to the dolomitic conglomerate facies of the Triassic, and to the Carboniferous Limestone series. The latter are restricted to the woodlands Big Stoke and Little Stoke, which along with Calve's Plot Wood are ancient woodland sites. Big Stoke and Little Stoke were almost entirely clear-felled during World War I. Two nationally rare plants occur at Rodney Stoke: purple gromwell (Lithospermum purpurocaeruleum) and the endemic whitebeam (Sorbus anglica). The site supports a diverse fauna. Badgers (Meles meles) are common and two or three setts are occupied each year. Noctule bats (Nyctalus noctula) and pipistrelle bats (Pipistrellus pipistrellus) roost in Big Stoke. Breeding birds include buzzard (Buteo buteo) and spotted flycatcher (Muscicapa striata). Small enclosures and tall hedges provide sheltered conditions that are ideal for many species of invertebrate. Butterflies are well represented with marbled white (Melanargia galathea), purple hairstreak (Quercusia quercus), brown argus (Aricia agestis) and grayling (Hipparchia semele).

Part of the land area designated as Rodney Stoke SSSI is owned by the Church Commissioners.
