= Fairy Cave Quarry =

Disused quarry in Somerset, England

Coordinates: 51.2259°N 2.4921°W

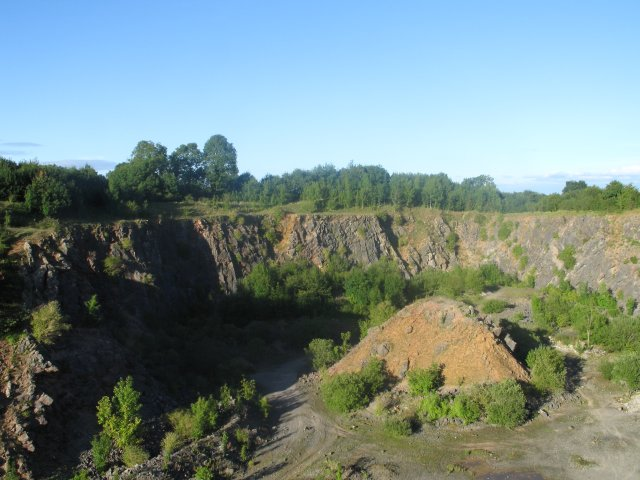
Fairy Cave Quarry.

Fairy Cave Quarry (grid reference ST65734753) is between Stoke St Michael and Oakhill in the limestone of the Mendip Hills, in Somerset, England.

Quarrying was first started on the site in the early 1920s. In 1963 the quarry was acquired by Hobbs (Quarries) Ltd., and production on a much larger scale began. Excavations cut back into the hillside above St Dunstan's Well Rising, a Bristol Water abstraction point (long since abandoned); various caves were intercepted. The quarry ceased production in 1977.

The caves in Fairy Cave Quarry include:

- Balch Cave
- Conning Tower Cave
- Fairy Cave
- Fernhill Cave
- Hillier's Cave
- Hillwithy Cave
- Shatter Cave
- W/L Cave
- Withyhill Cave

The caves in the quarry were formed by water from an unknown source. Withybrook Slocker is an active swallet to the south of the quarry and although the water sinking here presently flows through the quarry caves the stream is misfit. Withybrook Slocker, however, gives access to the upstream continuation of the quarry caves and digging activities by the Cerberus Spelaeological Society will hopefully lead to the discovery of the original source of the system.

The quarry has also been used extensively for climbing, with 172 named routes. Although this was previously without permission of the landowners, in July 2010 access for climbers was agreed.

== See also ==
- Caves of the Mendip Hills
- Quarries of the Mendip Hills
