= Wells Rural District =

Former local government area in the UK

Coordinates: 51.207°N 2.652°W

- Area
  - 1911: 58,119 acres (235.20 km^{2})
  - 1961: 57,175 acres (231.38 km^{2})
- Population
  - 1911: 10,633
  - 1961: 10,577
- History
  - Created: 1894
  - Abolished: 1974
- Status: Rural district
  - HQ: Wells

Wells was a rural district in Somerset, England, from 1894 to 1974.

It was created in 1894 under the Local Government Act 1894, taking over the responsibilities of the former Wells Rural Sanitary District. Each parish elected one or more councillors:

| Parish | Rural District Councillors |
|---|---|
| Baltonsborough | 2 |
| Butleigh | 2 |
| Chewton Mendip | 2 |
| Dinder | 1 |
| Meare | 2 |
| North Wootton | 1 |
| Priddy | 1 |
| Rodney Stoke | 1 |
| Sharpham | 1 |
| St Cuthbert Out | 3 |
| Walton | 1 |
| West Pennard | 2 |
| Westbury | 1 |
| Wookey | 2 |

In 1904 the parish of Godney was formed from part of the parish of Meare.

Wells Rural District was abolished in 1974 under the Local Government Act 1972 when it became part of Mendip district.
