= Shatter Cave =

Cave in Somerset, England

Coordinates: 51°13′33″N 2°29′32″W

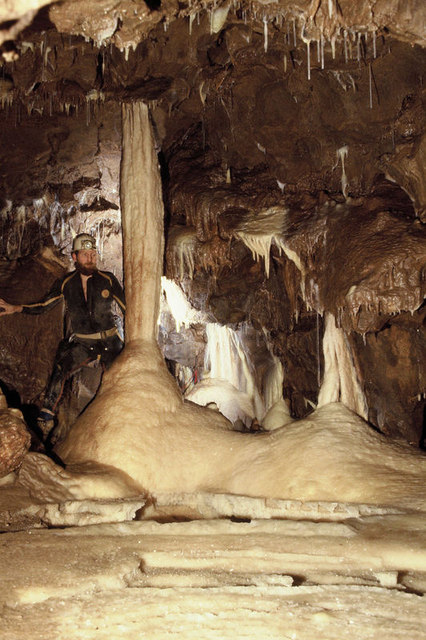
- Pillar Chamber, Shatter Cave
- Interactive map of Shatter Cave
- Location: Stoke St Michael, UK
- OS grid: ST65734753
- Geology: Limestone
- Registry: Mendip Cave Registry

Shatter Cave is a cave in Fairy Cave Quarry, near Stoke St Michael in the limestone of the Mendip Hills, in Somerset, England. It falls within the St. Dunstan's Well Catchment Site of Special Scientific Interest.

The name commemorates the damage, done by blasting in the quarry, to some of the decoration within the cave.

== Description ==
Shatter Cave has been described as being one of the finest decorated caves in Britain in terms of their sheer abundance of pure white and translucent calcite deposits. The floor of Diesel Chamber includes some fine gours, Helicite Rift contains heligmites and a stalactite curtain, and Pillar Chamber contains a 3 metres (10 ft) high white pillar as well as one of the finest crystalline gour floors in Great Britain. Tor Chamber, Portcullis Grottoes and Pisa Passage are also highly decorated.

== Access ==
The Fairy Caves Management Committee administers the access to this cave on behalf of the quarry owners. In order to protect the calcite formations, novices are not allowed to enter Shatter Cave.

== See also ==
- Caves of the Mendip Hills
