= Edford Woods and Meadows =

Site of Special Scientific Interest in Somerset, England

- Site of Special Scientific Interest
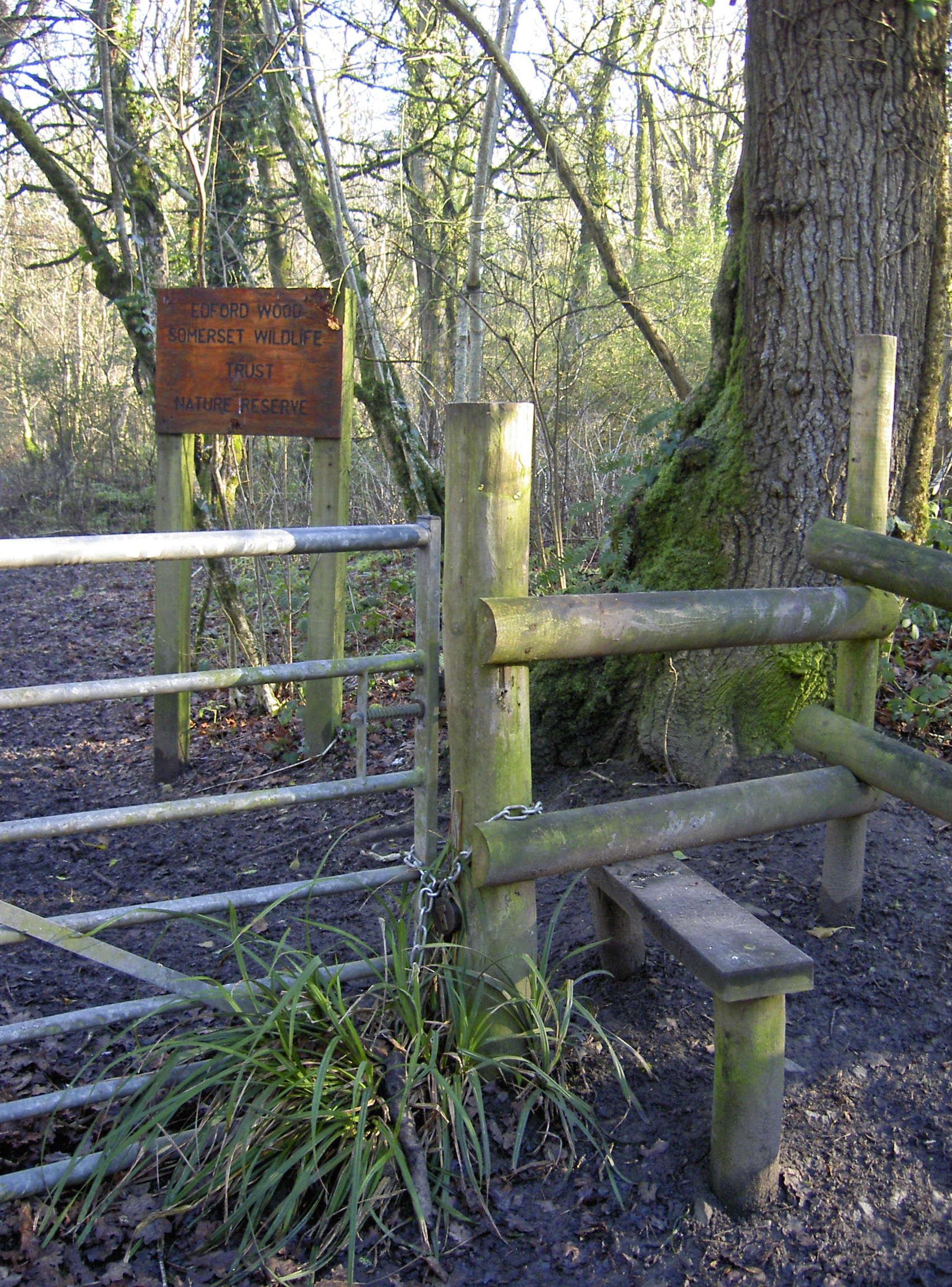

- Location within Somerset
- Location of Edford Woods and Meadows.
- Area of search: Somerset
- Grid reference: ST665485
- Coordinates: 51.23469°N 2.48121°W
- Interest: Biological
- Area: 54.3 hectares (0.543 km^{2}; 0.210 sq mi)
- Notification date: 1957

Edford Woods and Meadows (grid reference ST665485) is a 54.3 hectare (134.1 acre) biological Site of Special Scientific Interest, between Nettlebridge, Holcombe and Stoke St Michael, Somerset, notified in 1957.

This site is important for the occurrence of a wide range of types of semi-natural ancient woodland and for unimproved meadows and pastures of a type which is now uncommon in Britain.

The forests in Edford Wood are dominated by Ash and Alder trees, with Pedunculate Oak and Sessile Oak growing there as well. Hazel and other plants form a lush and varied undergrowth, with different species living in the moist soil of the valley floor rather than in the drier soil further up the hill sides. The rare herb monk's hood grows in abundance in the region.
