= Sharpham =

Village and civil parish in Somerset, England

Coordinates: 51.1356°N 2.7653°W

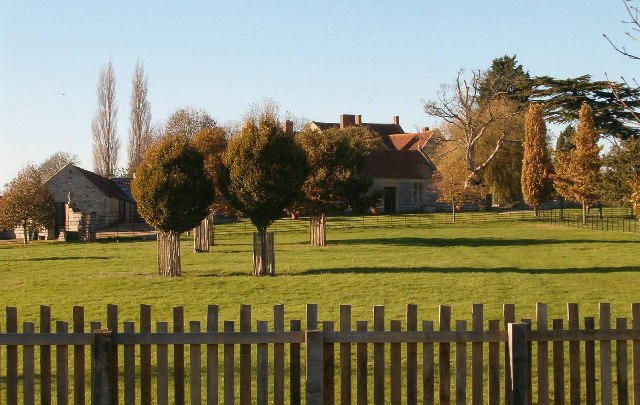
- Abbots Sharpham

- Location within Somerset
- Population: 130 (2011)
- OS grid reference: ST465376
- Unitary authority: Somerset
- Ceremonial county: Somerset
- Region: South West
- Country: England
- Sovereign state: United Kingdom
- Post town: STREET
- Postcode district: BA16 9
- Dialling code: 01458
- Police: Avon and Somerset
- Fire: Devon and Somerset
- Ambulance: South Western
- UK Parliament: Wells and Mendip Hills

Sharpham is a village and civil parish on the Somerset Levels near Street and Glastonbury in the county of Somerset, England. It is located near the River Brue.

== Governance ==
The parish council has responsibility for local issues, including setting an annual precept (local rate) to cover the council's operating costs and producing annual accounts for public scrutiny. The parish council evaluates local planning applications and works with the local police, district council officers, and neighbourhood watch groups on matters of crime, security, and traffic. The parish council's role also includes initiating projects for the maintenance and repair of parish facilities, as well as consulting with the district council on the maintenance, repair, and improvement of highways, drainage, footpaths, public transport, and street cleaning. Conservation matters (including trees and listed buildings) and environmental issues are also the responsibility of the council.

For local government purposes, since 1 April 2023, the parish comes under the unitary authority of Somerset Council. Prior to this, it was part of the non-metropolitan district of Mendip (established under the Local Government Act 1972). It was part of Wells Rural District before 1974.

It is also part of the Wells and Mendip Hills constituency represented in the House of Commons of the Parliament of the United Kingdom. It elects one member of parliament (MP) by the first past the post system of election.

== Sharpham Park estate ==
Sharpham Park is a 300-acre (1.2 km^{2}) historic park with evidence of use dating back to the Bronze Age. The first known reference is a grant by King Edwy to the then Aethelwold in 957. In 1191 Sharpham Park was conferred by the soon-to-be King John I to the Abbots of Glastonbury, who remained in possession of the park and house until the dissolution of the monasteries in 1539. From 1539 to 1707 the park was owned by the Duke of Somerset, Sir Edward Seymour, brother of Queen Jane; the Thynne family of Longleat; and the family of Sir Henry Gould. The house is now a private residence and Grade II* listed building. It was the birthplace of Sir Edward Dyer (1543–1607) an Elizabethan poet and courtier, the writer Henry Fielding (1707–54), and the cleric William Gould (1715–1799). Also home to the Laver family, one of the largest cattle dealers in the west country in the nineteenth century.

The Sharpham Park estate is now owned by Roger Saul, founder of the Mulberry fashion company, and produces organic foods specialising in spelt (an ancient cereal grain). A restoration project is underway, partly funded by the "Countryside Stewardship" scheme from DEFRA. It involves restoring, preserving and maintaining archaeological and historic features including a Bronze Age trackway and a duck decoy pond that is a Scheduled Ancient Monument. This will allow the reintroduction of red deer (Cervus elaphus) along with other rare breeds of sheep and cattle.

== Sharpham Moor Plot ==
Nearby is the Sharpham Moor Plot Site of Special Scientific Interest, where detailed plant records exist from as far back as 1915, and continue up to the present day.

== Peat extraction ==
Peat extraction is still active around the village. This has been a significant industry for many years in the surrounding villages of Meare, Shapwick, Ashcott, and Walton on Westhay Moor, and is remembered at the Peat Moors Centre at Westhay.
