= Kilmersdon Road Quarry =

Geological Site of Special Scientific Interest in Somerset, England

- Site of Special Scientific Interest
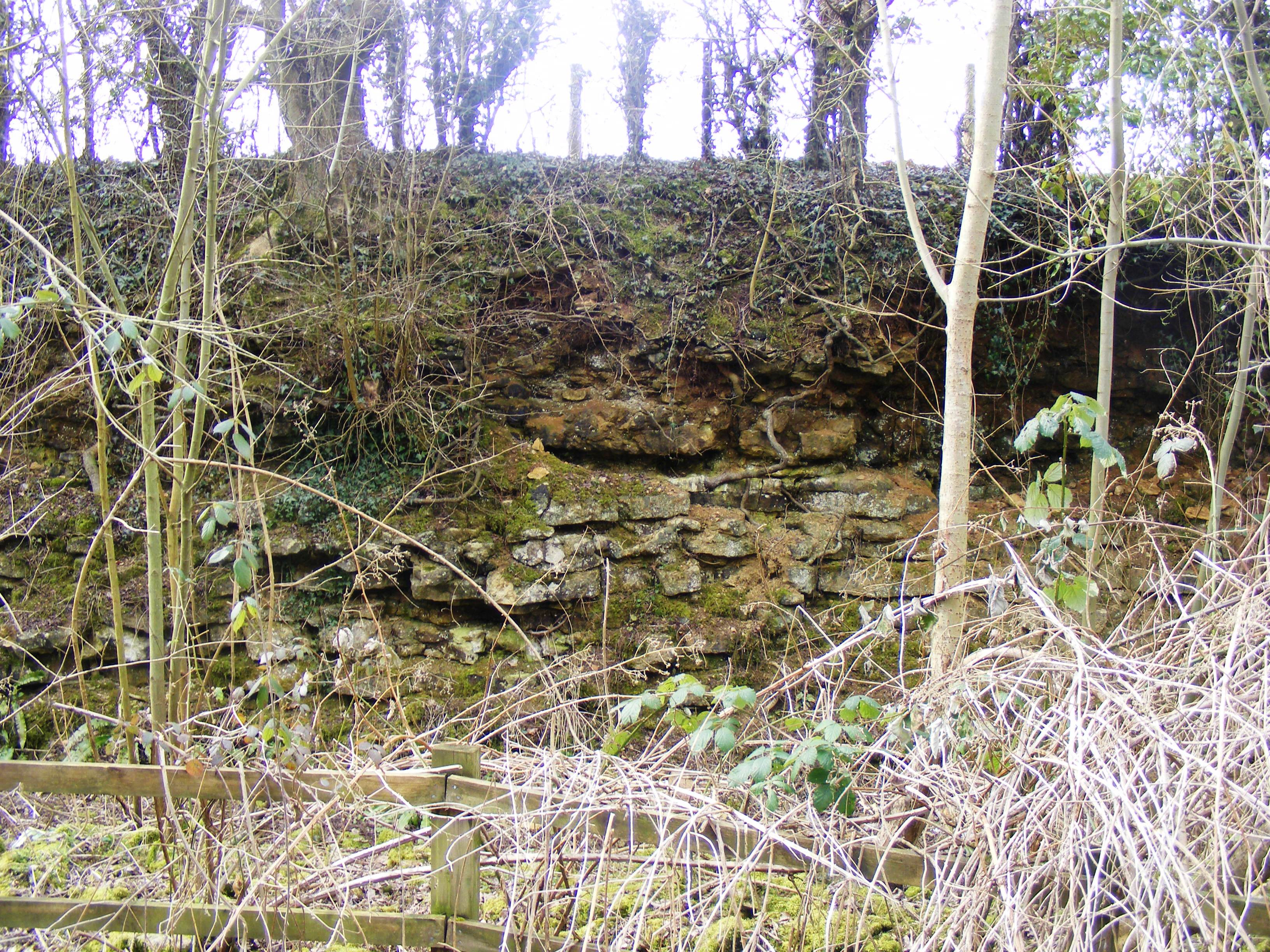

- Location within Somerset
- Location of Kilmersdon Road Quarry.
- Area of search: Avon
- Grid reference: ST689542
- Coordinates: 51.28608°N 2.44733°W
- Interest: Geological
- Area: 0.43 hectares (0.0043 km^{2}; 0.0017 sq mi)
- Notification date: 1954

Kilmersdon Road Quarry (grid reference ST689542) is a 0.43 hectare geological Site of Special Scientific Interest between the village of Haydon and the town of Radstock, Bath and North East Somerset, notified in 1954.

This is a key Lias locality spanning much of the Hettangian, Sinemurian and Pliensbachian stages.
