= Noel Mellish =

- Born: 24 December 1880; Barnet, London, England
- Died: 8 July 1962 (aged 81); South Petherton, Somerset, England
- Burial place: Weymouth Crematorium
- Military career
- Allegiance: United Kingdom
- Branch: British Army
- Service years: 1915–1919
- Rank: Chaplain
- Units: Royal Army Chaplains' Department
- Conflicts: Second Boer War; World War I
- Awards: Victoria Cross; Military Cross
- Other work: Anglican priest

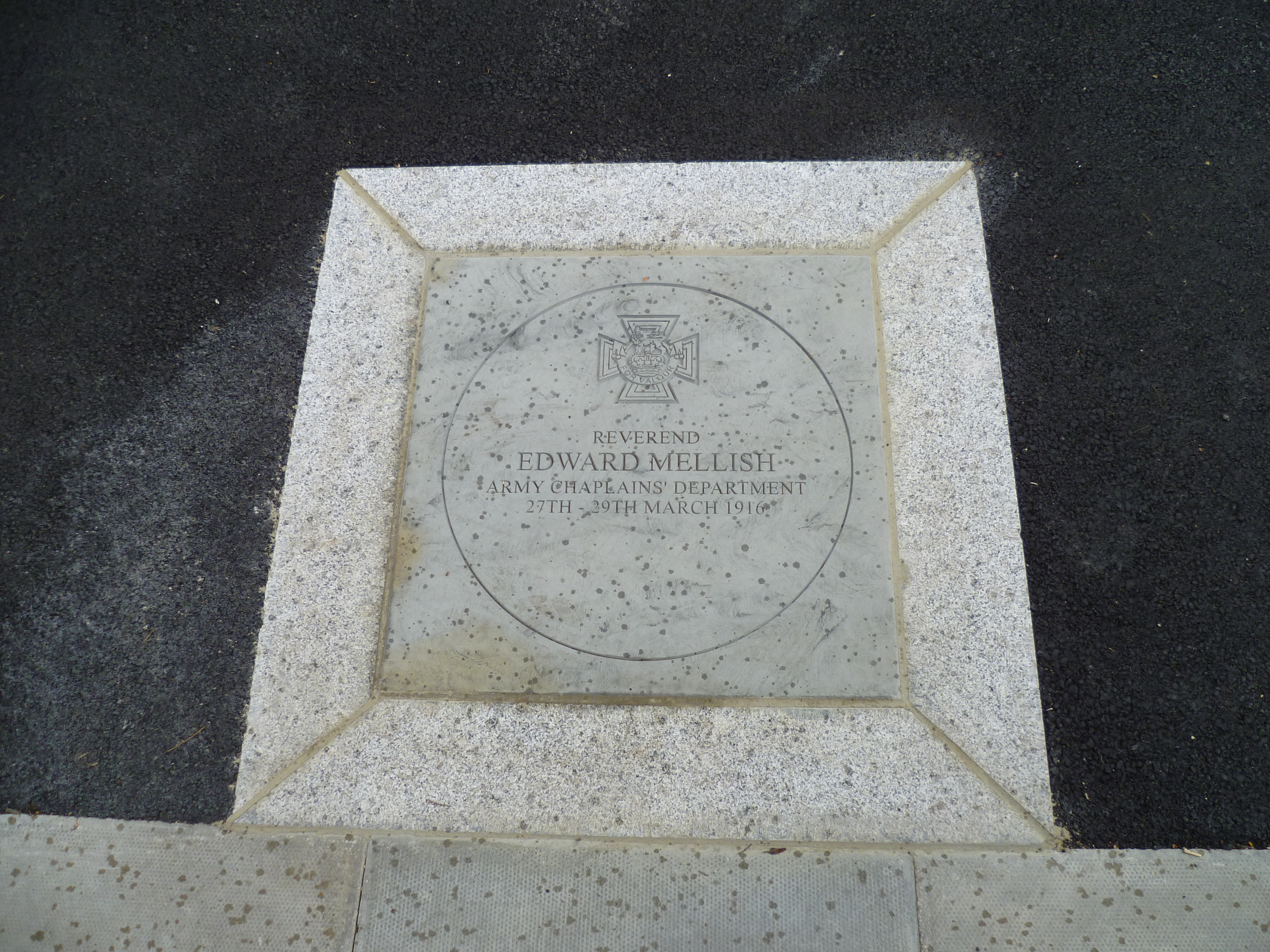
The memorial plaque to Noel Mellish in Oakleigh Park, London.

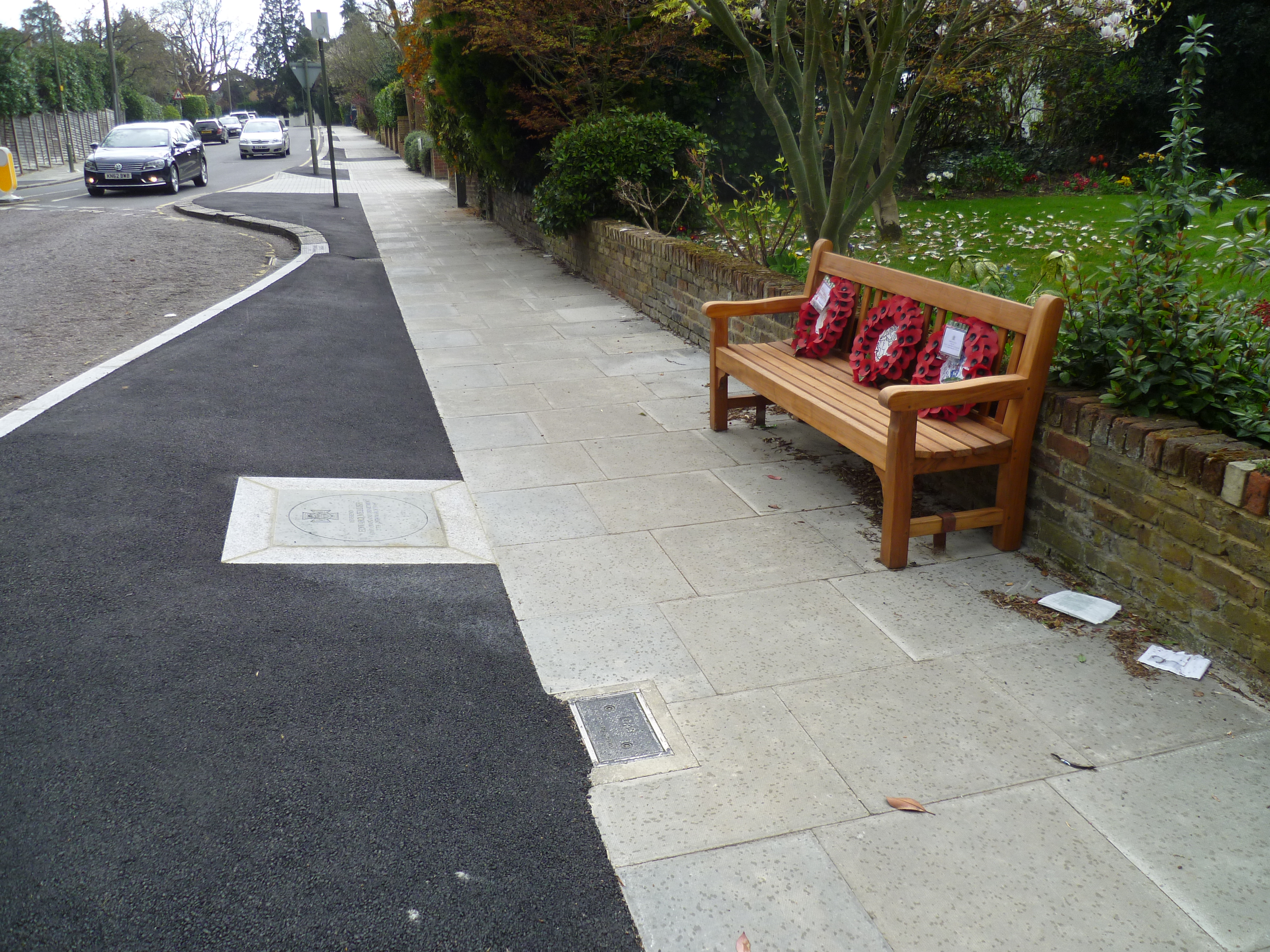
The plaque and associated bench with wreaths, April 2016.

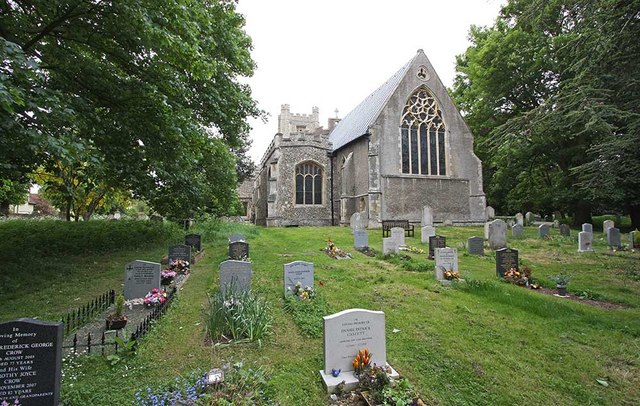
St Mary the Virgin Church, Great Dunmow.

Edward Noel Mellish VC MC DL (24 December 1880 – 8 July 1962) was an English recipient of the Victoria Cross, the highest and most prestigious award for gallantry in the face of the enemy that can be awarded to British and Commonwealth forces. He was the first Padre to receive the award.

== Background and family ==
Edward Noel Mellish was born on 24 December 1880 at Oakleigh Park, Barnet, North London. He was the son of Edward and Mary Mellish. He went on to be educated at Saffron Walden Grammar School and from there became a member of the Artists Rifles. In 1900 he began serving with Baden-Powell's Police during the Second Boer War in South Africa.

He returned to study Theology at King's College London and took holy orders in 1912.

On December 3, 1918 he married Elizabeth Wallace Molesworth (b.1894), great-great-great granddaughter of the Hon. Major Edward Molesworth, son of Robert Molesworth, 1st Viscount Molesworth.

== World War I ==
On the outbreak of the First World War Mellish was assistant curate at St Paul's, Deptford. He offered his services to the chaplaincy and served from May 1915 until February 1919. Just a few months after the start of his service, his brother Second Lieutenant Richard Coppin Mellish was killed in action whilst serving with the 1st Middlesex Regiment at the Battle of Loos on 25 September 1915. Reverend Mellish was attached to the 4th Battalion of the Royal Fusiliers in Ypres Salient in 1916 and it was then during the first three days of the Actions of St Eloi Craters, 27 to 29 March 1916, that he performed the actions for which he was awarded the Victoria Cross. He was the first member of the army chaplaincy to win the VC in the First World War.

=== Victoria Cross ===
Mellish was 35 years old, and a chaplain in the Army Chaplains' Department, British Army during the First World War when the following deeds took place for which he was awarded the VC. He received his VC from King George V in an investiture at Buckingham Palace on 12 June 1916.

The citation reads:

"For most conspicuous bravery. During heavy fighting on three consecutive days he repeatedly went backwards and forwards, under continuous and heavy shell and machine-gun fire, between our original trenches and those captured from the enemy, in order to tend and rescue wounded men. He brought in ten badly wounded men on the first day from ground swept by machine-gun fire, and three were actually killed while he was dressing their wounds.

The battalion to which he was attached was relieved on the second day, but he went back and brought in twelve more wounded men.

On the night of the third day he took charge of a party of volunteers and once more returned to the trenches to rescue the remaining wounded.

This splendid work was quite voluntary on his part and outside the scope of his ordinary duties."

Sint-Elooi (St Eloi) is located approximately about 5 km (3.1 mi) south of Ypres, Belgium. The defence of St Eloi is commemorated by the Hill 62 Memorial.

His Victoria Cross is displayed at the Fusilier Museum in the Tower of London. Replica medals are on display at the Museum of Army Chaplaincy.

=== After the war ===
Meelish was awarded the Military Cross in 1919.

After the war Mellish was vicar of St Mark's, Lewisham and later of Wangford-cum-Henham and Reydon in Suffolk. He was vicar of St Mary's Church, Great Dunmow in Essex from 1928 to 1948 and then was licensed as the perpetual curate of the Church of St Dunstan, Baltonsborough in Somerset.

He served in the Second World War as an air-raid precautions warden. In 1946 he was appointed a deputy lieutenant of the county of Essex.

== Memorial ==
Mellish's birthplace, Trenabie House, in Oakleigh Park North, no longer exists but in March 2016 a plaque was installed nearby in a ceremony attended by Mellish's daughter Claire.
