= Oldford =

Oldford is a surname. Notable people with the surname include:

- Augustus Oldford (1925–2023), Canadian social worker, magistrate, and politician
- Britne Oldford (born 1992), Canadian-American actress
- Doug Oldford (born c. 1949), Canadian politician
