= Mendip District =

Former non-metropolitan district in England

Mendip
- Non-metropolitan district

- Shown within Somerset
- Sovereign state: United Kingdom
- Constituent country: England
- Region: South West England
- Ceremonial county: Somerset
- Admin HQ: Shepton Mallet
- Created; Abolished: 1 April 1974; 1 April 2023

Government
  - Type: Non-metropolitan district

Area
  - Total: 285.50 sq mi (739.44 km^{2})

Population (2024)
  - Total: 116,285
  - Density: 407.30/sq mi (157.26/km^{2})
- Time zone: UTC0 (GMT)
  - Summer (DST): UTC+1 (BST)
- Post Code: BA
- Area code: 01749

Mendip was a local government district of Somerset in England. The district covered a largely rural area of 285 square miles (738 km^{2}) with a population of approximately 112,500, ranging from the Wiltshire border in the east to part of the Somerset Levels in the west. The district took its name from the Mendip Hills. The administrative centre of the district was Shepton Mallet but the largest town was Frome.

The district was formed on 1 April 1974 under the Local Government Act 1972 by a merger of the municipal boroughs of Glastonbury and Wells, along with Frome, Shepton Mallet, and Street urban districts, and Frome Rural District, Shepton Mallet Rural District, Wells Rural District, part of Axbridge Rural District and part of Clutton Rural District.

On 1 April 2023, the district was abolished and became part of Somerset Council, a unitary authority.

== Toponymy ==
Several explanations for the name Mendip have been suggested. Its earliest known form is Mendepe in 1185. One suggestion is that it is derived from the medieval term Myne-deepes. However, A D Mills derives its meaning from Celtic monith, meaning mountain or hill, with an uncertain second element, perhaps Old English yppe in the sense of upland, or plateau.

An alternative explanation is that the name is cognate with Mened (Welsh mynydd), a Brythonic term for upland moorland. The suffix may be a contraction of the Anglo-Saxon hop, meaning a valley. Possible further meanings have been identified. The first is 'the stone pit' from the Celtic meyn and dyppa in reference to the collapsed cave systems of Cheddar. The second is 'Mighty and Awesome' from the Old English moen and deop.

== Governance ==
Until 2023, Mendip district fell under the jurisdiction of Mendip District Council. At the 2019 local elections, no party gained overall control.

Party	Seats	Net Gain/Loss
Liberal Democrat	22	+11
Conservative	10	-22
Green	10	+7
Independent	5	+4

As of March 2022, the council had 23 Liberal Democrats, 12 Conservatives, 10 Greens, and 2 Independents.

=== Abolition ===
On 1 April 2023, the council was abolished and replaced by Somerset Council, a unitary authority for the area previously served by Somerset County Council. Elections for the new council took place in May 2022, and it ran alongside Mendip and the other councils until their abolition in April 2023.

== Settlements ==
The five main settlements of the former Mendip council were Frome, Glastonbury, Shepton Mallet, Street and Wells. Frome, Glastonbury and Shepton Mallet were the only towns in the district, with Wells having city status and Street maintaining its status as a village despite a population in excess of 11,000.

Other villages and hamlets included:

- Ashwick
- Baltonsborough – Batcombe – Beckington – Binegar – Bleadney – Bowlish – Buckland Dinham – Burcott – Butleigh – Butleigh Wootton
- Chantry – Charterhouse – Chelynch – Chesterblake – Chewton Mendip – Chilcompton – Coleford – Coxley – Cranmore – Croscombe
- Dean – Dinder – Ditcheat – Doulting – Draycott – Dulcote
- East Lydford – East Pennard – Easton – Emborough – Evercreech
- Farleigh Hungerford – Faulkland
- Godney – Great Elm – Green Ore
- Henton – Highbury – Holcombe – Hornblotton – Horrington – Huxham Green
- Kilmersdon
- Lamyatt – Leigh-on-Mendip – Leighton – Litton – Lydford-on-Fosse
- Maesbury – Meare – Mells
- Nettlebridge – North Wootton – Norton St Philip – Nunney
- Oakhill – Oldford
- Pilton – Polsham – Prestleigh – Priddy – Pylle
- Rode – Rodney Stoke
- Southway – Standerwick – Ston Easton – Stratton-on-the-Fosse – Stoke St Michael – Stoney Stratton
- Thrupe – Trudoxhill
- Upton Noble
- Vobster
- Walton – Wanstrow – Waterlip – West Compton – West Lydford – West Pennard – West Woodlands – Westbury-sub-Mendip – Westcombe – Westhay – Whatley – Wookey – Wookey Hole – Worminster – Witham Friary
- Yarley

== Parishes ==
Image	Name	Status	Population	Former local authority	Coordinates	Refs
Gray stone building with square tower at left hand end. Foreground includes grass area with gravestones, taken over the top of metal railings.	Ashwick	Civil parish	1,352	Shepton Mallet Rural District	51.23°N 2.52°W	
Brown stone building with square tower at the left hand end. In the foreground is a grass area with gravestones.	Baltonsborough	Civil parish	864	Wells Rural District	51.11°N 2.64°W	
A row of whitewashed buildings on the left with climbing plants. Small flower filled gardens separate them from a stone wall fronting a road.	Batcombe	Civil parish	439	Shepton Mallet Rural District	51.15°N 2.44°W	
Street scene showing brown stone houses with tiled roofs. Several parked cars in the road.	Beckington	Civil parish	983	Frome Rural District	51.26°N 2.28°W	
Yellow stone building with prominent square tower. Trees to left and right of the path leading to the building.	Berkley	Civil parish	344	Frome Rural District	51.24°N 2.27°W	
Stone three stage square tower surmounted by a flag pole. To the right are trees and in the foreground grass.	Binegar	Civil parish	313	Shepton Mallet Rural District	51.24°N 2.55°W	
Street scene showing grey stone houses on the left of a road with a few cars.	Buckland Dinham	Civil parish	381	Frome Rural District	51.26°N 2.35°W	
Grassy area with trees in the foreground and a terrace of stone houses, one white fronted, in the background	Butleigh	Civil parish	823	Wells Rural District	51.09°N 2.68°W	
Stone two bay building with prominent ornamental tower behind	Chewton Mendip	Civil parish	585	Wells Rural District	51.28°N 2.58°W	
Street scene with stone cross on three tier plinth to the left of the road. In the background is a white walled building.	Chilcompton	Civil parish	2,062	Clutton Rural District	51.27°N 2.50°W	
Stone building with prominent square tower at near end. In the foreground are gravestones and trees to the left and right.	Coleford	Civil parish	2,313	Frome Rural District	51.24°N 2.45°W	
Stone building with arched porchway. Prominent square tower to the left hand end of building. In the foreground gravestones and crosses on grass.	Cranmore	Civil parish	667	Shepton Mallet Rural District	51.19°N 2.48°W	
Water flowing through a channel and over a weir between a building and a wall. Vegetation on both sides of the water.	Croscombe	Civil parish	603	Shepton Mallet Rural District	51.20°N 2.58°W	
Yellow stone building with central square tower, Foreground is paths through green grass.	Ditcheat	Civil parish	725	Shepton Mallet Rural District	51.13°N 2.54°W	
Gray stone building with two arched porch entrance doors. Separated from road by stone wall.	Doulting	Civil parish	618	Shepton Mallet Rural District	51.19°N 2.51°W	
Stone building with square tower to left hand end. Foreground shows gravestones in grass area.	East Pennard	Civil parish	348	Shepton Mallet Rural District	51.14°N 2.62°W	
Whitewashed building with square tower.	Emborough	Civil parish	148	Shepton Mallet Rural District	51.26°N 2.55°W	
Street scene. Stone cross on a pillar rising from 5 step plinth. Iron lampost left and right of the road are stone terraced houses.	Evercreech	Civil parish	2,334	Shepton Mallet Rural District	51.14°N 2.51°W	
Street scene. Buildings to left and right of narrow road.	Frome	Town	26,203	Frome Rural District; Frome Urban District	51.23°N 2.32°W	
Red roofs of multiple houses, with some larger white roofs at the far side. Surrounded by trees and grren fields on all sides. Hills on the horizon.	Glastonbury	Town	8,932	Glastonbury Municipal Borough	51.15°N 2.71°W	
Stone building at the end of narrow lane with water filled ditches on either side. Surrounded by fields and trees.	Godney	Civil parish	237	Wells Rural District	51.18°N 2.74°W	
Stone two arch bridge over water	Great Elm	Civil parish	171	Frome Rural District	51.24°N 2.36°W	
Stone building with arched windows. Prominent square tower to the right hand end. In the foreground are gravestones in grassy area.	Hemington	Civil parish	640	Frome Rural District	51.28°N 2.39°W	
Street scene. Road junction with red stop sign. Two cars. The sides of the roads are stone walls with large trees showing above them.	Holcombe	Civil parish	947	Shepton Mallet Rural District	51.24°N 2.46°W	
Stone building with old metal sign above the door saying Old Post Office, red post box set into the wall and to the left an old blue telephone box. The door is below the level of the road and separated by metal railings. Hanging baskets of flowers on the front of the building.	Kilmersdon	Civil parish	541	Frome Rural District	51.27°N 2.44°W	
Gray stone building with square tower at left hand end. In the foreground are gravestones on grass.	Lamyatt	Civil parish	183	Shepton Mallet Rural District	51.12°N 2.49°W	
Street scene showing a road unction with parked cars. On the left and right are stone houses with trees and fields in the distance.	Leigh-on-Mendip	Civil parish	514	Frome Rural District	51.23°N 2.44°W	
Stone building with square tower at left hand end. In the foreground are trees and gravestones.	Litton	Civil parish	240	Clutton Rural District	51.29°N 2.58°W	
Cast iron pump with its own tiled roof. Behind are two stone built thatched cottages.	Lullington	Civil parish	162	Frome Rural District	51.26°N 2.31°W	
Small shop with white surrounds to the windows set in the right hand building of a terrace.	Lydford-on-Fosse	Civil parish	511	Shepton Mallet Rural District	51.07°N 2.62°W	
Yellow stone building with tiled roof and arched doorway.	Meare	Civil parish	1,304	Wells Rural District	51.17°N 2.77°W	
Street of grey stone houses. The church tower can be seen n the background	Mells	Civil parish	638	Frome Rural District	51.24°N 2.39°W	
Stone church tower with flag pole. In the foreground are gravestones on grass.	North Wootton	Civil parish	317	Wells Rural District	51.17°N 2.62°W	
White fronted building with black beams prominent. Over the door is a sign saying The George Inn, Wadworths.	Norton St Philip	Civil Parish	858	Frome Rural District	51.29°N 2.32°W	
Ruined stone castle with round towers at each corner.	Nunney	Civil parish	844	Frome Rural District	51.21°N 2.38°W	
Long stone building with buttressed walls and red tiled roof.	Pilton	Civil parish	998	Shepton Mallet Rural District	51.17°N 2.59°W	
Large area of green grass with stone farm buildings behind. In the centre is a small thatched wooden building.	Priddy	Civil parish	624	Wells Rural District	51.25°N 2.68°W	
Stone building with prominent square tower. Surrounded by trees and with green grass area in the foreground separated from the building by a stone wall.	Pylle	Civil parish	160	Shepton Mallet Rural District	51.14°N 2.56°W	
Street scene. Triangular area of grass with village sign on wooden post and stone cross behind. Stone houses with tiled roofs n the background.	Rode	Civil parish	1,025	Frome Rural District	51.28°N 2.2°W	
Stone building with square three stage tower at the left hand end. Trees to the right hand gravestones in front.	Rodney Stoke	Civil parish	1,326	Wells Rural District	51.25°N 2.74°W	
–	Selwood	Civil parish	798	Frome Rural District	51.24°N 2.31°W	
Stone buildings seen behind trees and grass area with wooden fence in the foreground.	Sharpham	Civil parish	130	Wells Rural District	51.14°N 2.77°W	
Street scene with buildings on the left and right. In a central position is a stone arched building with a spire.	Shepton Mallet	Town	10,369	Shepton Mallet Urban District	51.19°N 2.55°W	
Stone building with square tower	St Cuthbert Out	Civil parish	3,749	Wells Rural District	51.18°N 2.69°W	
Gray bstone building with square tower to the left hand end, partially obscured by tree. In the foreground is a stone wall separating the church from the road.	Stoke St Michael	Civil parish	926	Shepton Mallet Rural District	51.22°N 2.48°W	
Stone building with square tower. Foreground is grass with gravestones.	Ston Easton	Civil parish	550	Clutton Rural District	51.28°N 2.54°W	
Gray stone building with square tower. Foreground is grass with gravestones.	Stratton on the Fosse	Civil parish	1,108	Shepton Mallet Rural District	51.25°N 2.49°W	
Paved shopping street with shops on either side. Green bollards	Street	Civil parish	11,805	Street Urban District	51.12°N 2.74°W	
Stone arched bridge with wooden handrail over river.	Tellisford	Civil parish	182	Frome Rural District	51.29°N 2.28°W	
Street scene. Red telephone box and telegraph pole. Stone buildings around road junction.	Trudoxhill	Civil parish	423	Frome Rural District	51.19°N 2.37°W	
Stone building with tower beyond field and stone wall.	Upton Noble	Civil parish	128	Frome Rural District	51.15°N 2.41°W	
White circular building with three windows, surrounded by vegetation.	Walton	Civil parish	1,106	Wells Rural District	51.14°N 2.77°W	
Street scene. Houses to left and right of road junction.	Wanstrow	Civil parish	489	Frome Rural District	51.17°N 2.41°W	
People at coloured market stalls. Surrounding are houses with the towers of the cathedral visible behind.	Wells	City	10,536	Wells Municipal Borough	51.21°N 2.65°W	
Yellow stone building with red tiled roof and square tower with short spire. Foreground is grass with gravestones.	West Bradley	Civil parish	277	Shepton Mallet Rural District	51.13°N 2.64°W	
Gray stone building with arched windows and square tower. Foreground is grass with gravestones.	West Pennard	Civil parish	670	Wells Rural District	51.14°N 2.65°W	
Stone building with square tower partially obscured by tree.	Westbury	Civil parish	801	Wells Rural District	51.24°N 2.71°W	
Stone building with archway through it for the road. Steps to wooden doorway on the first floor.	Whatley	Civil parish	245	Frome Rural District	51.23°N 2.38°W	
A row of cottages, partially obscured by vegetation. In the background is the bell tower of a much large building.	Witham Friary	Civil parish	399	Frome Rural District	51.17°N 2.37°W	
Two bay building with square tower with spirelet. In the foreground are gravestones in a grassy area.	Wookey	Civil parish	1,311	Wells Rural District	51.21°N 2.69°W	

== Transport ==
=== Major roads ===
- A37 from Bristol to Yeovil
- A361 from the M5 to Frome
- A371 from Weston-super-Mare to Wincanton
- A39 from Bath to Bridgwater

=== Railway stations ===
- Frome, served by Great Western Railway on the Heart of Wessex Line and Reading to Taunton Line
- Served by the East Somerset Railway:
  - Cranmore
  - Cranmore West
  - Merryfield Lane
  - Mendip Vale

== See also ==
- Grade I listed buildings in Mendip
- Grade II* listed buildings in Mendip
- List of scheduled monuments in Mendip
- 2019–2023 structural changes to local government in England
