= Stoke St Michael =

Village and civil parish in Somerset, England

Coordinates: 51.2200°N 2.4800°W

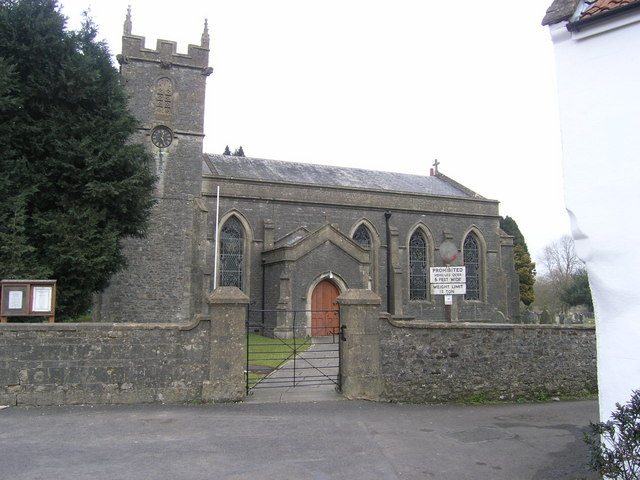
- Church of St Michael

- Location within Somerset
- Population: 926 (2011)
- OS grid reference: ST665465
- Unitary authority: Somerset Council
- Ceremonial county: Somerset
- Region: South West
- Country: England
- Sovereign state: United Kingdom
- Post town: RADSTOCK
- Postcode district: BA3
- Dialling code: 01749
- Police: Avon and Somerset
- Fire: Devon and Somerset
- Ambulance: South Western
- UK Parliament: Frome and East Somerset

Stoke St Michael is a village and civil parish on the Mendip Hills 4 miles (6.4 km) north east of Shepton Mallet, and 8 miles (12.9 km) west of Frome, in the county of Somerset, England.

== History ==
Since the 14th century the village has also been known as Stoke Lane, although the origin of the alternative name is unclear, but may be connected to John de Lison who gave lands in the village to Glastonbury Abbey in 1253. The parish of Stoke Lane was part of the Whitstone Hundred.

The village became a centre for cloth manufacture with fulling mills being established on the River Frome to the north of the village. Henry Fussell established paper mills in 1803, and his family, who came from the village, including James Fussell established their iron works and edge-tool business in Mells.

The Knatchbull Arms was built in the late 17th century, and is named after the Knatchbulls of Babington who held the manor in the late 18th century.

The manor house on Tower Hill, which was previously known as the old vicarage, was built around 1700.

== Governance ==
The parish council has responsibility for local issues, including setting an annual precept (local rate) to cover the council's operating costs and producing annual accounts for public scrutiny. The parish council evaluates local planning applications and works with the local police, district council officers, and neighbourhood watch groups on matters of crime, security, and traffic. The parish council's role also includes initiating projects for the maintenance and repair of parish facilities, as well as consulting with the district council on the maintenance, repair, and improvement of highways, drainage, footpaths, public transport, and street cleaning. Conservation matters (including trees and listed buildings) and environmental issues are also the responsibility of the council.

For local government purposes, since 1 April 2023, the parish comes under the unitary authority of Somerset Council. Prior to this, it was part of the non-metropolitan district of Mendip (established under the Local Government Act 1972). It was part of Shepton Mallet Rural District before 1974.

It is also part of the Frome and East Somerset county constituency represented in the House of Commons of the Parliament of the United Kingdom. It elects one Member of Parliament (MP) by the first past the post system of election.

== Geography ==
Several significant caves of the Mendip Hills are close to the village including Stoke Lane Slocker, many falling within the St. Dunstan's Well Catchment and those at the disused Fairy Cave Quarry.

Moon's Hill Quarry is a basalt quarry.

Cook's Wood Quarry is a geological Site of Special Scientific Interest and Geological Conservation Review Site. The main exposures are cut in very steeply-dipping Carboniferous Limestone. This was the original locality for the type section of the proposed ‘Cookswoodian Stage’. 9 species of Bat, Dormice and 4 species of Newts including the rare Great Crested Newt reside in Cooks Wood Quarry.

Edford Woods and Meadows is a biological Site of Special Scientific Interest, which is important for the occurrence of a wide range of types of semi-natural ancient woodland and for unimproved meadows and pastures of a type which is now uncommon in Britain.

== Religion ==
The Church of St Michael has a western tower of c. 1400, the remainder being built in 1838 by Jesse Gane. It is a Grade II* listed building. The church was a chapelry of Doulting. The former non-conformist chapel on Stoke Hill is now a private residence.
