= St Dunstan's Well Catchment =

Site of Special Scientific Interest in the Mendip Hills, Somerset, England

St. Dunstan's Well Catchment
- Site of Special Scientific Interest
- Location within Somerset
- Location of St. Dunstan's Well Catchment.
- Area of search: Somerset
- Grid reference: ST668475
- Coordinates: 51.2257°N 2.4768°W
- Interest: Biological and Geological
- Area: 39.8 hectares (0.398 km^{2}; 0.154 sq mi)
- Notification date: 1967

St. Dunstan's Well Catchment (grid reference ST668475) is a Site of Special Scientific Interest, covering 39.8 hectares (98.3 acres) near Stoke St Michael in the Mendip Hills, Somerset, England. The site was notified in 1967. It is of both geological and biological significance.

Formerly known as Stoke St Michael Slocker, it contains nine SSSI units consisting of rock and calcareous grassland.

== Geological ==
St Dunstan's Well Catchment area contains a series of spectacularly-decorated caves which in total extend to about 4 miles (6.4 km) of mapped passage. The caves at Fairy Cave Quarry were formed mainly by the erosive action of water flowing beneath the water-table at considerable pressure (so called 'phreatic' development), but as the water table has fallen many of the caves now lie well above it and the system now contains a variety of cave formations (stalagmites, stalactites and calcite curtains) which in their extent and preservation are amongst the best in Britain. Shatter Cave and Withyhill Cave are generally considered to be amongst the finest decorated caves in Britain in terms of their sheer abundance of pure white and translucent calcite deposits.

== Biological ==
An area of nationally rare species-rich unimproved calcareous grassland of the Sheep's-fescue-Meadow Oat-grass type occurs in the field to the east of Stoke Lane Quarry. Small numbers of greater horseshoe bat (Rhinolophus ferrumequinum), lesser horseshoe bat (Rhinolophus hipposideros) and Natterer's bat (Myotis nattereri) hibernate in the cave system.
