= Grade I listed buildings in Mendip =

Mendip is a former local government district in the English county of Somerset. The Mendip district covers a largely rural area of 285 square miles (738 km^{2}) ranging from the Mendip Hills through on to the Somerset Levels. The administrative centre of the district is Shepton Mallet.

In the United Kingdom, the term listed building refers to a building or other structure officially designated as being of special architectural, historical or cultural significance; Grade I structures are those considered to be "buildings of exceptional interest". Listing was begun by a provision in the Town and Country Planning Act 1947. Once listed, severe restrictions are imposed on the modifications allowed to a building's structure or its fittings. In England, the authority for listing under the Planning (Listed Buildings and Conservation Areas) Act 1990 rests with Historic England, a non-departmental public body sponsored by the Department for Digital, Culture, Media and Sport; local authorities have a responsibility to regulate and enforce the planning regulations.

There are 90 Grade I listed buildings in Mendip. Most are Norman- or medieval-era churches, many of which are included in the Somerset towers, a collection of distinctive, mostly spireless Gothic church towers. The greatest concentrations of Grade I listed buildings are in Wells and Glastonbury. In Wells these are clustered around the 10th-century Cathedral Church of St Andrew, better known as Wells Cathedral, and the 13th-century Bishop's Palace. Glastonbury is the site of the Abbey, where construction started in the 7th century, and its associated buildings. The ruined St Michael's church, damaged in an earthquake of 1275, stands on Glastonbury Tor, where the site shows evidence of occupation from Neolithic times and the Dark Ages. The Chalice Well has been in use since Pre-Christian times. Glastonbury Abbey had a wider influence outside the town: tithe barns were built at Pilton and West Bradley to hold tithes, and a Fish House was built at Meare along with a summer residence for the Abbot (now Manor Farmhouse).

Medieval structures include Farleigh Hungerford Castle, fortified around 1370, and The George Inn at Norton St Philip, used as an army headquarters during the Monmouth Rebellion in 1685, and then as a courtroom to try the rebels in the Bloody Assizes. Manor houses such as the 15th-century Seymours Court Farmhouse at Beckington and The Old Manor at Croscombe. Mells Manor followed in the 16th century and in the 17th century Southill House in Cranmore was built. Ston Easton Park and Ammerdown House in Kilmersdon were both completed in the 18th century. The most recent buildings included in the list are churches: the Church of St Peter at Hornblotton, built in 1872–74 by Sir Thomas Graham Jackson to replace a medieval church on the same site, and Downside Abbey at Stratton-on-the-Fosse, more formally known as "The Basilica of St Gregory the Great at Downside", a Roman Catholic Benedictine monastery and the Senior House of the English Benedictine Congregation. The current buildings were started in the 19th century and are still unfinished.

== Buildings ==
Name	Location	Type	Completed (Note: The date given is the date used by Historic England as significant for the initial building or that of an important part in the structure's description.)	Grid ref. (Note: The grid reference is based on the British national grid reference system, sometimes known as OSGB36, used by the Ordnance Survey.) Geo-coordinates	Entry number (Note: The "List Entry Number" is a unique number assigned to each listed building and scheduled monument by Historic England.)	Image	Ref.
1 St Andrew Street	Wells	House	1348, c. 1360 and 1424	ST5516945949; 51°12′40″N 2°38′35″W	1383102	1 St Andrew Street More images	
1 – 13 Vicars Close	Wells	House	1348, c. 1360 and 1424	ST5514346023; 51°12′42″N 2°38′37″W	1383197	1 – 13 Vicars Close More images	
14 – 27 Vicars Close	Wells	House	1348, c. 1360 and 1424	ST5511546000; 51°12′41″N 2°38′38″W	1383199	14 – 27 Vicars Close More images	
Abbey Church of St Gregory the Great, Downside Abbey	Stratton-on-the-Fosse	Church	1872–82, c. 1890, 1901–1905, 1911–12, unfinished	ST6550950840; 51°15′20″N 2°29′44″W	1058633	Abbey Church of St Gregory the Great, Downside Abbey More images	
Abbey Tithe Barn, including attached wall to east	Glastonbury	Barn	14th century	ST5036138551; 51°08′39″N 2°42′40″W	1057953	Abbey Tithe Barn, including attached wall to east More images	
Abbot's Kitchen, Glastonbury Abbey	Glastonbury	Kitchen	pre Norman Conquest	ST4996938760; 51°08′45″N 2°43′00″W	1172820	Abbot's Kitchen, Glastonbury Abbey More images	
Ammerdown House and stables. Now known as Ammerdown Study Centre	Kilmersdon		1788	ST7111552663; 51°16′21″N 2°24′56″W	1058685	Ammerdown House and stables. Now known as Ammerdown Study Centre More images	
Bishop Burnell's Great Hall	Wells		c. 1280	ST5516845702; 51°12′32″N 2°38′35″W	1382875	Bishop Burnell's Great Hall More images	
Boundary Walls to 1 – 13 Vicars Close	Wells	House	1348, c. 1360 and 1424	ST5513746009; 51°12′41″N 2°38′37″W	1383198	Boundary Walls to 1 – 13 Vicars Close More images	
Boundary walls to 14 – 27 Vicars Close	Wells	House	1348, c. 1360 and 1424	ST5512546010; 51°12′41″N 2°38′38″W	1383200	Boundary walls to 14 – 27 Vicars Close More images	
Brown's Gatehouse	Wells	Gateway	1451	ST5494445852; 51°12′36″N 2°38′47″W	1383101	Brown's Gatehouse More images	
Cathedral Church of St Andrew and chapter house and cloisters	Wells	Cathedral	1490	ST5514845885; 51°12′37″N 2°38′36″W	1382901	Cathedral Church of St Andrew and chapter house and cloisters More images	
Chapel of St Leonard, perimeter wall and gateway, Farleigh Hungerford Castle	Farleigh Hungerford	Chapel	14th century	ST8012457612; 51°19′02″N 2°17′12″W	1345336	Chapel of St Leonard, perimeter wall and gateway, Farleigh Hungerford Castle More images	
Chapter House to Cathedral of St Andrew	Wells	Chapter House	1307	ST5516345912; 51°12′38″N 2°38′36″W	1382900	Chapter House to Cathedral of St Andrew More images	
Church of St Aldhelm	Doulting	Parish Church	12th century	ST6461343131; 51°11′11″N 2°30′28″W	1217750	Church of St Aldhelm More images	
Church of All Saints	East Pennard	Parish Church	14th century	ST5970537458; 51°08′06″N 2°34′38″W	1058488	Church of All Saints More images	
Church of All Saints	Lullington	Parish Church	c. 1280	ST7832051941; 51°15′58″N 2°18′44″W	1174267	Church of All Saints More images	
Church of All Saints	Nunney	Parish Church	12th century	ST7376145696; 51°12′35″N 2°22′37″W	1058297	Church of All Saints More images	
Church of St Andrew	Mells	Parish Church	Late 15th century	ST7279049280; 51°14′31″N 2°23′28″W	1295876	Church of St Andrew More images	
Church of St Bartholomew	Cranmore	Parish Church	15th century	ST6682343333; 51°11′18″N 2°28′34″W	1058528	Church of St Bartholomew More images	
Church of St Benedict	Glastonbury	Church	15th century	ST4976038836; 51°08′48″N 2°43′11″W	1057966	Church of St Benedict More images	
Church of St Cuthbert	Wells	Parish Church	13th century	ST5466745658; 51°12′30″N 2°39′01″W	1383111	Church of St Cuthbert More images	
Church of St Dunstan	Baltonsborough	Parish Church	15th century	ST5416234786; 51°06′38″N 2°39′22″W	1345010	Church of St Dunstan More images	
Church of St George	Beckington	Parish Church	14th century	ST8016951639; 51°15′49″N 2°17′08″W	1345317	Church of St George More images	
Church of St Giles	Leigh-on-Mendip	Parish Church	c. 1350	ST6924847278; 51°13′26″N 2°26′30″W	1058345	Church of St Giles More images	
Church of St James	Ashwick	Parish Church	1450	ST6371248419; 51°14′02″N 2°31′16″W	1058471	Church of St James More images	
Church of St John the Baptist	Glastonbury	Parish Church	15th century	ST5000239011; 51°08′53″N 2°42′58″W	1345459	Church of St John the Baptist More images	
Church of St John the Baptist	Pilton	Parish Church	11th century	ST5885440816; 51°09′54″N 2°35′23″W	1058818	Church of St John the Baptist More images	
Church of St Lawrence	Priddy	Parish Church	13th century	ST5282851385; 51°15′35″N 2°40′39″W	1177825	Church of St Lawrence More images	
Church of St Lawrence	Rode	Parish Church	Late 14th century	ST8080853384; 51°16′45″N 2°16′36″W	1345357	Church of St Lawrence More images	
Church of St Leonard	Marston Bigot	Parish Church	1789	ST7554944977; 51°12′13″N 2°21′05″W	1058276	Church of St Leonard More images	
Church of St Leonard	Rodney Stoke	Parish Church	12th century	ST4822449851; 51°14′44″N 2°44′35″W	1058592	Church of St Leonard More images	
Church of St Margaret	Babington	Parish Church	1748	ST7048951031; 51°15′28″N 2°25′27″W	1177624	Church of St Margaret More images	
Church of St Mary	Hardington	Parish Church	11th century	ST7423052559; 51°16′18″N 2°22′15″W	1058710	Church of St Mary More images	
Church of St Mary	Litton	Parish Church	13th century	ST5938254702; 51°17′24″N 2°35′02″W	1345127	Church of St Mary More images	
Church of St Mary	Hemington	Parish Church	12th century	ST7273653023; 51°16′33″N 2°23′32″W	1058711	Church of St Mary More images	
Church of St Mary	Meare	Parish Church	1323	ST4553841707; 51°10′19″N 2°46′49″W	1058750	Church of St Mary More images	
Church of St Mary	Witham Friary	Parish Church	c. 1200	ST7440341097; 51°10′07″N 2°22′03″W	1058224	Church of St Mary More images	
Church of St Mary, causeway bridge and gates	Orchardlea	Parish Church	13th century	ST7735550991; 51°15′27″N 2°19′33″W	1058142	Church of St Mary, causeway bridge and gates More images	
Church of St Mary Magdalene	Chewton Mendip	Parish Church	12th	ST5963853153; 51°16′34″N 2°34′48″W	1345137	Church of St Mary Magdalene More images	
Church of St Mary Magdalene	Ditcheat	Parish Church	12th century	ST6256936329; 51°07′30″N 2°32′10″W	1345167	Church of St Mary Magdalene More images	
Church of St Mary Magdalene	Great Elm	Parish Church	12th century	ST7463849325; 51°14′33″N 2°21′53″W	1295880	Church of St Mary Magdalene More images	
Church of St Mary the Virgin	Batcombe	Parish Church	15th century	ST6901339030; 51°08′59″N 2°26′40″W	1234822	Church of St Mary the Virgin More images	
Church of St Mary the Virgin	Croscombe	Parish Church	15th century	ST5906144421; 51°11′51″N 2°35′14″W	1174682	Church of St Mary the Virgin More images	
Church of St Matthew	Wookey	Parish Church	12th century	ST5185145791; 51°12′33″N 2°41′26″W	1295105	Church of St Matthew More images	
Church of St Michael	Buckland Dinham	Parish Church	c. 1200	ST7550051264; 51°15′36″N 2°21′09″W	1345316	Church of St Michael More images	
Church of St Nicholas	West Pennard	Parish Church	15th century	ST5521938263; 51°08′31″N 2°38′29″W	1345049	Church of St Nicholas More images	
Church of St Peter	Evercreech	Parish Church	14th century	ST6493738679; 51°08′47″N 2°30′09″W	1059172	Church of St Peter More images	
Church of St Peter	Hornblotton	Parish Church	1874	ST5914934151; 51°06′19″N 2°35′05″W	1058789	Church of St Peter More images	
Church of St Peter and St Paul	Kilmersdon	Parish Church	15th century	ST6959352423; 51°16′13″N 2°26′14″W	1307311	Church of St Peter and St Paul More images	
Church of St Peter and St Paul	Shepton Mallet	Parish Church	12th century	ST6197743670; 51°11′28″N 2°32′44″W	1345202	Church of St Peter and St Paul More images	
Church of the Holy Trinity	Street	Parish Church	14th century	ST4883437168; 51°07′53″N 2°43′57″W	1058753	Church of the Holy Trinity More images	
Church of the Holy Trinity	Whatley	Parish Church	1846	ST7192247020; 51°13′18″N 2°24′12″W	1345303	Church of the Holy Trinity More images	
Church of St Vigor	Stratton-on-the-Fosse	Parish Church	12th century	ST6592750779; 51°15′19″N 2°29′23″W	1345110	Church of St Vigor More images	
Churchyard cross in churchyard south of porch Church of St Mary Magdalene	Chewton Mendip	Parish Church	15th century	ST5963853153; 51°16′34″N 2°34′48″W	1345137	Churchyard cross in churchyard south of porch Church of St Mary Magdalene More images	
Churchyard cross in the churchyard about 9 metres south of south aisle, Church of St Nicholas	West Pennard	Churchyard cross	15th century	ST5522838251; 51°08′30″N 2°38′29″W	1175863	Churchyard cross in the churchyard about 9 metres south of south aisle, Church of St Nicholas More images	
Cloisters to Cathedral Church of St Andrew	Wells	Cloisters	13th century	ST5511645814; 51°12′35″N 2°38′38″W	1382902	Cloisters to Cathedral Church of St Andrew More images	
Court Barn	West Bradley		Early 15th century	ST5469537037; 51°07′51″N 2°38′56″W	1175792	Court Barn More images	
Farleigh Hungerford Castle	Farleigh Hungerford	Castle	14th century	ST8007957661; 51°19′04″N 2°17′14″W	1058117	Farleigh Hungerford Castle More images	
Former Rook Lane Congregational Chapel	Frome		1707	ST7753347870; 51°13′46″N 2°19′23″W	1167729	Former Rook Lane Congregational Chapel More images	
Former Tithe Barn in farmyard at Cumhill Farm	Pilton		14th century	ST5890140630; 51°09′48″N 2°35′21″W	1058842	Former Tithe Barn in farmyard at Cumhill Farm More images	
Gatehouse and boundary wall with bridge over moat	Wells		c. 1341	ST5519045631; 51°12′29″N 2°38′34″W	1382876	Gatehouse and boundary wall with bridge over moat More images	
Gatehouse to west of Manor Farmhouse	Whatley	Gatehouse	c. 1500	ST7337347611; 51°13′37″N 2°22′58″W	1175158	Gatehouse to west of Manor Farmhouse More images	
George Hotel and Pilgrims' Inn	Glastonbury		Late 15th century	ST4988738964; 51°08′52″N 2°43′04″W	1345455	George Hotel and Pilgrims' Inn More images	
Glastonbury Abbey	Glastonbury		pre Norman Conquest	ST5005838781; 51°08′46″N 2°42′55″W	1345447	Glastonbury Abbey More images	
Manor Farmhouse with attached range of outbuildings	Meare	Farmhouse	14th century	ST4556241744; 51°10′20″N 2°46′48″W	1175936	Manor Farmhouse with attached range of outbuildings More images	
Mells Manor and garden walls to rear	Mells		16th century	ST7272749280; 51°14′31″N 2°23′31″W	1058351	Mells Manor and garden walls to rear More images	
Penniless Porch	Wells	Gateway	c. 1450	ST5505945811; 51°12′35″N 2°38′41″W	1383024	Penniless Porch More images	
Seymours Court Farmhouse	Beckington	Farmhouse	15th century	ST8116752707; 51°16′24″N 2°16′17″W	1058220	Seymours Court Farmhouse More images	
Southill House and outbuildings	Cranmore		18th century	ST6716542627; 51°10′55″N 2°28′16″W	1058567	Southill House and outbuildings More images	
St John's Priory with front boundary wall and railings	Wells	Former Priory	14th century	ST5479545526; 51°12′26″N 2°38′55″W	1383115	St John's Priory with front boundary wall and railings More images	
St Michael's church tower, Tor Hill	Glastonbury Tor		13th century	ST5121838615; 51°08′41″N 2°41′55″W	1345475	St Michael's church tower, Tor Hill More images	
Ston Easton Park	Ston Easton		c. 1769	ST6252054080; 51°17′05″N 2°32′20″W	1345108	Ston Easton Park More images	
The Abbot's Fish House	Meare		14th century	ST4580441729; 51°10′20″N 2°46′36″W	1345067	The Abbot's Fish House More images	
The Bishop's Barn	Wells	Barn	15th century	ST5509045532; 51°12′26″N 2°38′39″W	1383158	The Bishop's Barn More images	
The Bishop's Chapel and the Bishop's Palace	Wells	Bishop's Palace and House	c. 1290	ST5520845734; 51°12′33″N 2°38′33″W	1382874	The Bishop's Chapel and the Bishop's Palace More images	
The Bishop's Eye	Wells	Gateway	c. 1451	ST5506445788; 51°12′34″N 2°38′41″W	1383026	The Bishop's Eye More images	
The Bishop's Palace and Bishop's House	Wells	Bishop's Palace and House	c. 1230	ST5520745781; 51°12′34″N 2°38′33″W	1382873	The Bishop's Palace and Bishop's House More images	
The Blue House	Frome		1726	ST7774448109; 51°13′54″N 2°19′12″W	1345500	The Blue House More images	
The Chain Gate with approach staircase	Wells	Gateway	c. 1460	ST5515245930; 51°12′39″N 2°38′36″W	1382904	The Chain Gate with approach staircase More images	
The Chalice Well	Glastonbury		Pre-Christian	ST5065638508; 51°08′37″N 2°42′24″W	1167594	The Chalice Well More images	
The Gatehouse	Baltonsborough	House	16th century	ST5363734712; 51°06′35″N 2°39′49″W	1345035	The Gatehouse More images	
The George Inn	Norton St Philip	Inn	14th century	ST7741055886; 51°18′06″N 2°19′31″W	1174953	The George Inn More images	
The Old Deanery	Wells	Former Deanery	12th century	ST5500045919; 51°12′38″N 2°38′44″W	1382906	The Old Deanery More images	
Old Deanery Court with link wall along east side	Wells	Former Deanery	12th century	ST5502545948; 51°12′39″N 2°38′43″W	1382907	Old Deanery Court with link wall along east side More images	
Gatehouse and south boundary wall to the Old Deanery	Wells	Gatehouse	12th century	ST5503545920; 51°12′39″N 2°38′42″W	1382908	Gatehouse and south boundary wall to the Old Deanery More images	
The Old Manor	Croscombe	Manor House	c. 1460	ST5927644317; 51°11′48″N 2°35′03″W	1174843	The Old Manor More images	
The Tribunal	Glastonbury		15th century	ST4993438961; 51°08′52″N 2°43′02″W	1345457	The Tribunal More images	
The Vicars' Chapel	Wells	Private chapel	c. 1430	ST5510946076; 51°12′44″N 2°38′39″W	1383201	The Vicars' Chapel More images	
The Vicars' Hall including number 28	Wells	Assembly and dining hall for the Vicars Choral	1348	ST5514845942; 51°12′39″N 2°38′37″W	1383202	The Vicars' Hall including number 28 More images	
The well house about 35 metres north of Bishop's Palace	Wells		c. 1451	ST5522745824; 51°12′35″N 2°38′32″W	1382877	The well house about 35 metres north of Bishop's Palace More images	
Tithe Barn in farmyard at Manor Farm	Doulting		15th century	ST6472443023; 51°11′07″N 2°30′22″W	1221353	Tithe Barn in farmyard at Manor Farm More images	

== See also ==
- Grade I listed buildings in Somerset
- List of Somerset towers
- Grade II* listed buildings in Mendip
