= Church of St Nicholas, West Pennard =

Church in Somerset, England

Church of St Nicholas
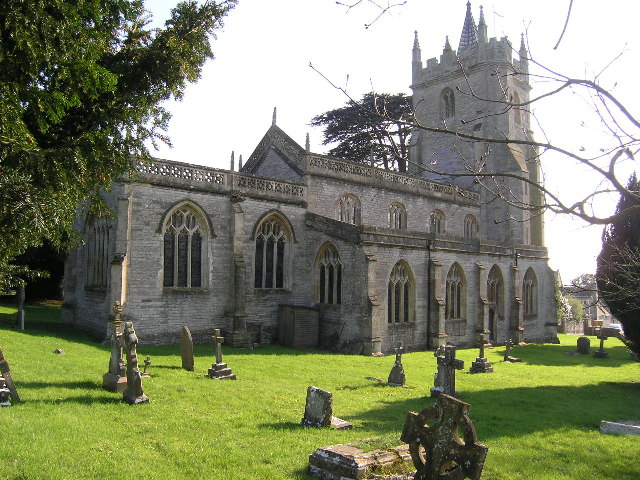

- Location within Somerset

General information
- Location: West Pennard, England
- Coordinates: 51.1412°N 2.6397°W
- Completed: 15th century

The Church of St Nicholas in West Pennard, Somerset, England, dates from the 15th century and is a Grade I listed building.

From the 13th to 15th century West Pennard was a chapelry of the Church of St John the Baptist in Glastonbury. The chapel was dedicated to Saint Nicholas in 1210.

The tower dates from around 1482, following the chancel and south aisle which had been built earlier in the 15th century. The north aisle was added in the 16th century. The tower holds six bells four of which were cast in the early 17th century.

The interior includes a screen with Tudor carvings in the chancel.

The churchyard cross, which was built between 1493 and 1524 by Abbot Richard Beere of Glastonbury, is also Grade I listed.

The parish is part of the Brue benefice which includes Baltonsborough with Butleigh, West Bradley and West Pennard within the Glastonbury deanery.

== See also ==
- Grade I listed buildings in Mendip
- List of Somerset towers
- List of ecclesiastical parishes in the Diocese of Bath and Wells
