= St Benedict's Church, Glastonbury =

Church in Somerset, England

Church of St Benedict
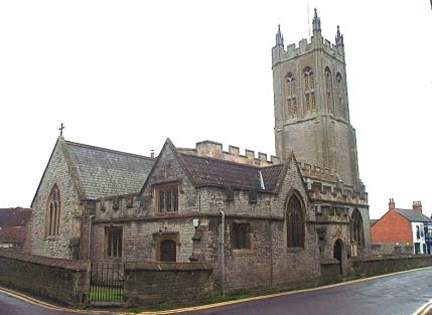

- Location within Somerset
- 51°08′48″N 2°43′11″W
- Location: Glastonbury, Somerset, England

History
- Built: 14th century

Listed Building – Grade I
- Official name: Church of St Benedict
- Designated: 21 June 1950
- Reference no.: 1057966

The Anglican Church of St Benedict at Glastonbury within the English county of Somerset was built as a Norman chapel in the 11th century with substantial additions in the 15th and 19th centuries. It is a Grade I listed building.

== History ==
The first church on the site was dedicated to Saint Benignus in the 11th century, possibly due to confusion with the Anglo-Saxon Beonna. The dedication was changed to Saint Benedict in the 17th century.

The current building is late medieval although the exact date is unknown. The tower was added in the mid 15th century. Abbot Richard Beere (1493–1524) added the north aisle and porch. The stained glass windows were replaced in the 1840s. In 1862 Benjamin Ferrey added the south chapel. Victorian restoration was carried out by J. D. Sedding in the 1880s. During 2014 extensive renovation work was carried out.

The church was a dependent chapel of the nearby Church of St John the Baptist and both were under the control of Glastonbury Abbey until the Dissolution of the Monasteries. It is now part of a benefice with St Johns and St Mary's & All Saints Church in the village of Meare within the Diocese of Bath and Wells.

== Architecture ==
The Lias stone church has a four-bay nave, north and south aisles, a chancel and a arclerestory. The three-stage west tower is supported by set back buttresses. It has an embattled parapet. It contains six bells, five of which date from 1776.

The interior includes a 13th-century piscina.

== See also ==
- Grade I listed buildings in Mendip
- List of ecclesiastical parishes in the Diocese of Bath and Wells
