= Church of the Holy Trinity, Chantry =

Church in Somerset, England

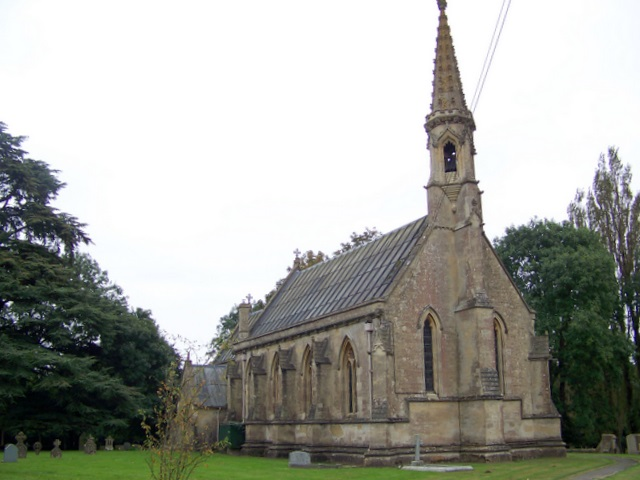
- Chantry Church

- Location within Somerset

General information
- Location: Whatley, Mendip, England
- Coordinates: 51.221693°N 2.403431°W
- Construction started: 1844
- Completed: 1846

The Church of the Holy Trinity at Chantry, in the parish of Whatley, Somerset, England, dates from 1844 to 1846. It was designed by George Gilbert Scott and William Moffatt, with further work by William George Brown of Frome, for James Fussell, who owned the Old Iron Works, Mells. It is a Grade I listed building.

The small Doulting stone church has a nave, chancel, porch and vestry. The roof is covered by 400 slates each of which is 6 feet (1.8 m) by 1 foot 9 inches (0.53 m) with the gaps covered by rolls of slate. The small spire contains a single bell.

In 1858 Richard William Church was amongst the clergy of the church.

Nearby is the Manor Farmhouse Gatehouse which was built around 1500 and is also Grade I listed.

The parish is within the benefice of Mells with Buckland Dinham, Great Elm and Whatley within the Frome deanery.

== See also ==
- Grade I listed buildings in Mendip
- List of Somerset towers
- List of ecclesiastical parishes in the Diocese of Bath and Wells
