= Manor Farmhouse, Meare =

Manor Farmhouse
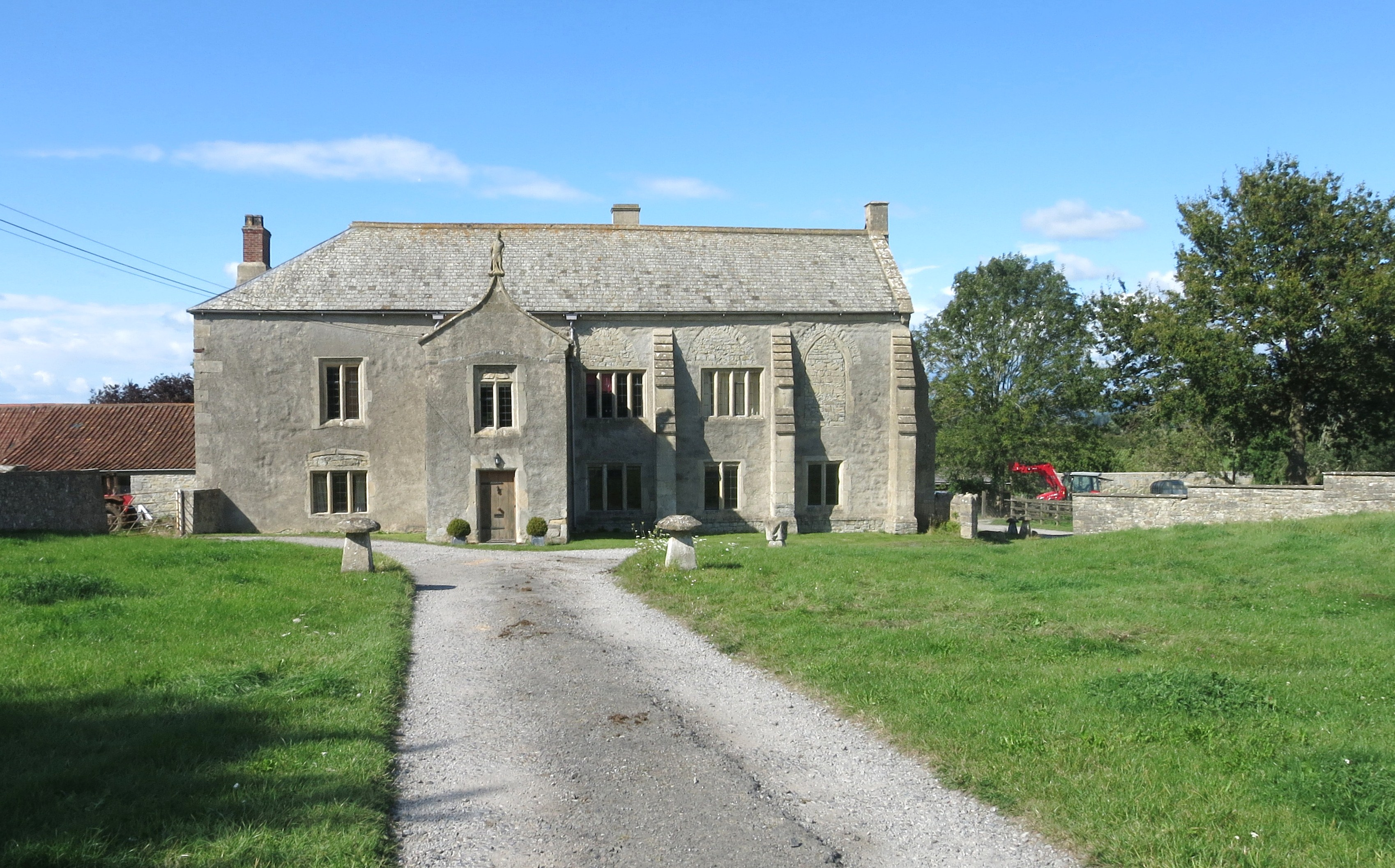

- Location within Somerset
- 51°10′19″N 2°46′44″W
- Location: Meare, Somerset, England

History
- Built: 14th century

Listed Building – Grade I
- Official name: Manor Farmhouse With Attached Range of Outbuildings
- Designated: 22 November 1966
- Reference no.: 1175936

The Manor Farmhouse in Meare, Somerset, England, was built in the 14th century as the summer residence of the Abbots from Glastonbury Abbey and is now a farmhouse. Along with its outbuildings the farmhouse has been designated as a Grade I listed building.

A building on the site in the late 13th century had a hall and south chamber, however little remains from the fabric of this building and the current structure was erected in the 14th. A chapel and cellar were included for the monks by Adam of Sodbury who was the abbot from 1323 to 1334. Richard Beere added further rooms in the early 16th century. The surrounding land provided an orchard and herb garden. There were four fish ponds. The nearby Abbot's Fish House was built around the same time as the house. The fish ponds surrounding the Fish House were recorded in the Domesday Book of 1086 when they were tended by ten fishermen. The fishponds, which were connected with drains and gullies were up to 30 metres (98 ft) long and 5 metres (16 ft) wide. These were connected to the Meare Pool and the River Brue. At one point 5,000 eels were caught each year. Pike, Bream and "white fish" were also caught.

The two-storey building has a porch over the moulded doorway. The main hall was east of the entrance doorway and porch. The wing to the rear contains a large room on the upper floor, which contains a large stone fireplace with a stone hood. A stone figure in robes and mitre appears above the porch which is believed to represent Abbot Richard Whiting, who presided over Glastonbury at the time of the Dissolution of the Monasteries under King Henry VIII of England, and was imprisoned in the Tower of London and executed on Glastonbury Tor in 1539. He is considered a martyr by the Roman Catholic Church, which beatified him on 13 May 1895.

== See also ==
- List of Grade I listed buildings in Mendip
