= The Abbot's Fish House, Meare =

Grade I listed building and scheduled monument in Meare, Somerset, England

The Abbot's Fish House
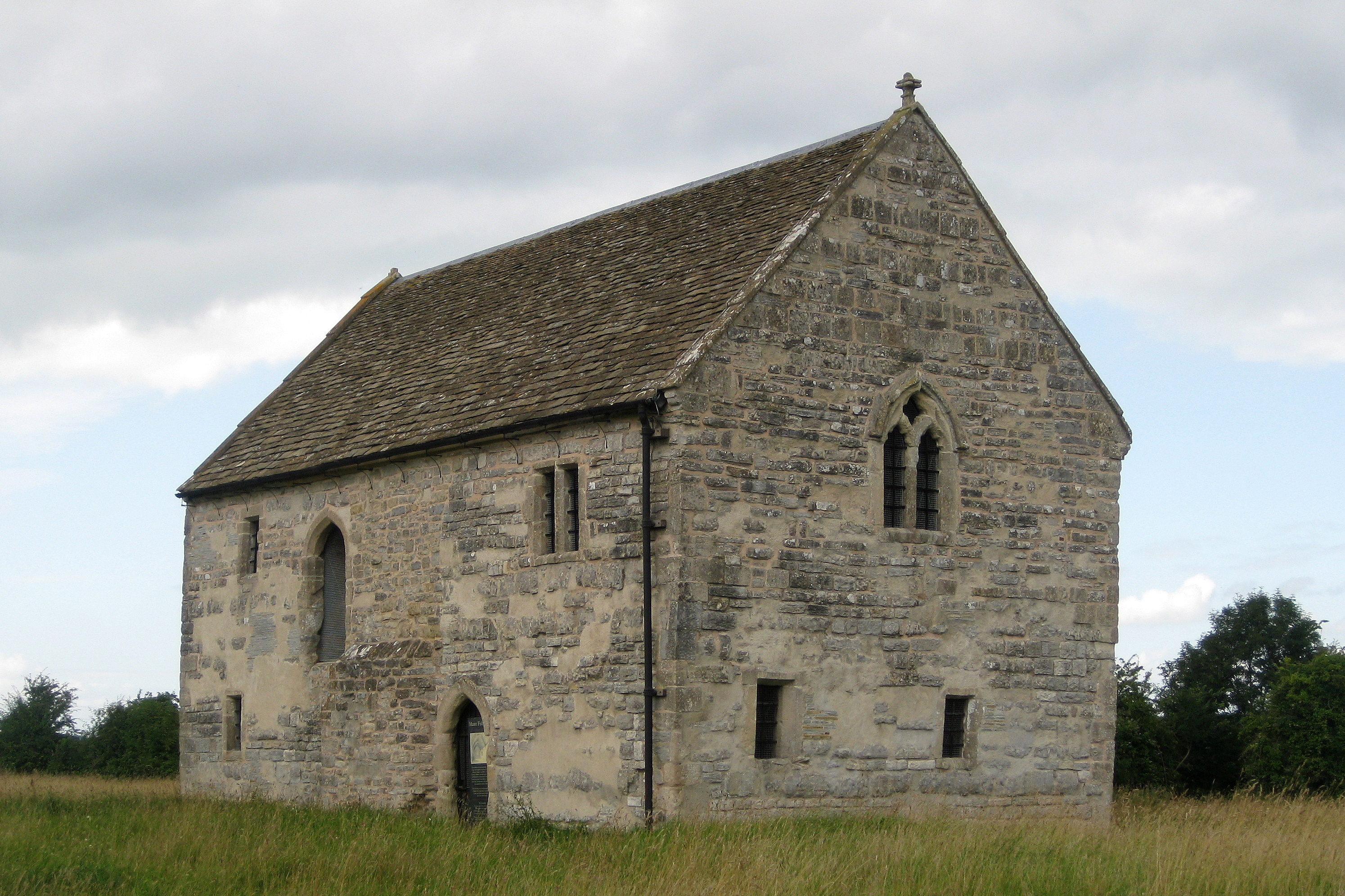

- Location within Somerset

General information
- Architectural style: Gothic
- Location: Meare, Somerset, England
- Coordinates: 51.1718°N 2.7760°W
- Completed: 14th century

Scheduled monument
- Official name: The Abbot's Fish House and Fishponds
- Designated: 7 August 1916
- Reference no.: 1008018

Listed Building – Grade I
- Official name: The Abbot's Fish House
- Designated: 22 November 1966
- Reference no.: 1345067

The Abbot's Fish House in Meare, Somerset, England, was built in the 14th century and has been designated as a Grade I listed building and scheduled monument. It is the only surviving monastic fishery building in England.

Fishing was an important source of food for the monks of Glastonbury Abbey. Fishing was carried out in artificial ponds, which were mentioned at Meare in the Domesday Book and from the River Brue and Meare Pool. The present rectangular stone building was constructed by the abbot between 1322 and 1335 for the storage and processing of the fish and as a residence for the chief fisherman. After the Dissolution of the Monasteries the building fell into disrepair and it was seriously damaged by fire in the 1880s. Some restoration has been undertaken during the 20th century, including the replacement of the roof in the 1920s.

== History ==
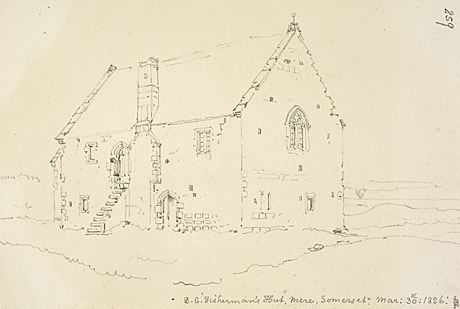
Sketch by John Buckler, 1826.

The fish ponds surrounding the Fish House were recorded in the Domesday Book of 1086 when they were tended by ten fishermen. The fishponds, which were connected with drains and gullies were up to 30 metres (98 ft) long and 5 metres (16 ft) wide. These were connected to the Meare Pool and the River Brue. At one point 5,000 eels were caught each year. Pike, bream and "white fish" were also caught.

Meare Pool was formed by water ponding-up behind the raised peat bogs between the Wedmore and the Polden Hills, and coring has shown that it is filled with at least 2 metres (6.6 ft) of detritus mud, especially in the Subatlantic climatic period (1st millennium BC). Early drainage work was carried out in the later years of the 12th century, with the responsibility for maintaining all the watercourses between Glastonbury and the sea being placed on named individuals among whom were Ralph de Sancta Barbara of Brentmarsh. Its precise boundaries varied according to season, and, over the longer term, as efforts were made to drain the area. The south end was bordered by the high ground that the village of Meare is built upon. The pond would have extended no further west than the current Westhay to Wedmore road, where a shelf of rock formed a natural boundary. To the north lies the Godney ridge. The eastern extent is harder to determine, and it may have gone as far as the site of the Glastonbury Lake Village.

The importance of this fishpond industry is illustrated by a series of acrimonious disputes between Glastonbury and the Dean and Chapter of Wells Cathedral. The Abbey required fish on Fridays, fast days and during Lent. Drainage of the surrounding area by monks of Glastonbury Abbey had reduced the size of the lake to 500 acres (200 ha) at the time of the Dissolution of the Monasteries. Meare Pool had disappeared from maps by 1749.

The current fish house was built between 1322 and 1335 when Adam of Sodbury was the Abbot of Glastonbury who also built the Church of St Mary in the village and the Manor House as his summer residence. It may have replaced a previous abbey building. The upper floor was the abode of the chief fisherman when he visited intermittently and the ground floor was used for storing nets and the salting and preparing fish. Some alterations were made, probably in the 15th century.

Meare Pool was drained after the Dissolution of the Monasteries and the fish house fell into disrepair. It suffered a fire in the 1880s, which destroyed the roof and gutted the interior. In 1893 some repairs were made to the walls, although the roof was not replaced until work was undertaken by the Ministry of Works in the 1920s, with further conservation being carried out in the 1960s. A piece of timber from the building was subject to dendrochronology testing in an attempt to provide a more specific date for the buildings construction, but the results proved inconclusive.

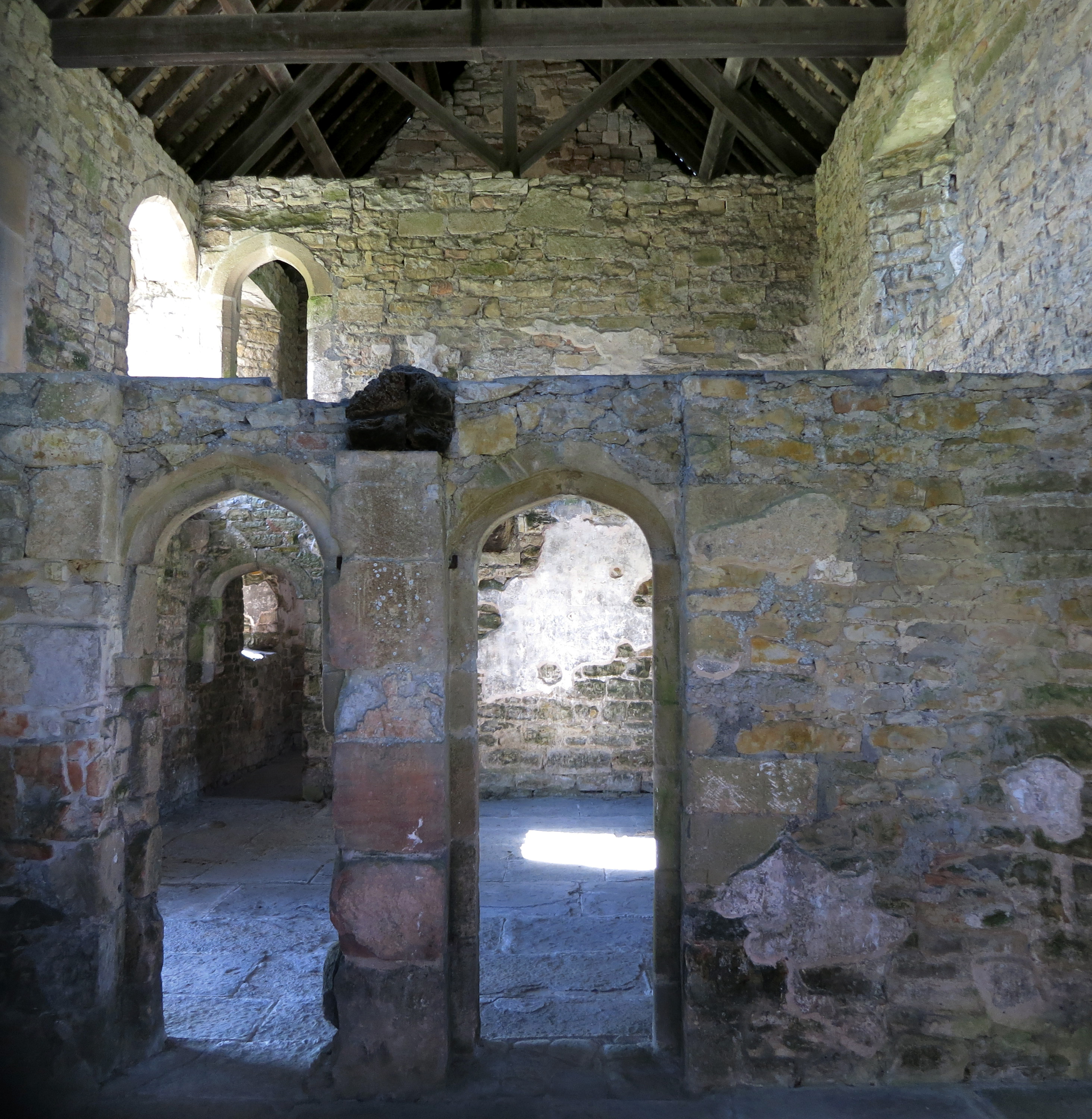

In 1910 the building was inspected by Charles Reed Peers under the Ancient Monuments Protection Act 1900 and taken into state guardianship. The fish house is now in the care of English Heritage.

== Architecture ==
The rectangular Blue Lias stone building has a stone tiled roof. It is 12.4 metres (41 ft) long and 6.6 metres (22 ft) wide. The ground floor had three rooms, one larger than the others which had a fireplace, and a door in the southern wall. The larger room was the hall and linked by arched doorways to the smaller rooms. There were two rooms on the first floor, which were damaged in the fire of 1884, which also has a small entrance door which was accessed via exterior stone steps which no longer exist. There was also a latrine in a turret which no longer exists. There are small traceried arched windows.

== See also ==
- Grade I listed buildings in Mendip
- List of Scheduled Monuments in Mendip
