= Church of St Mary, West Bradley =

Church in Somerset, England

Church of St Mary
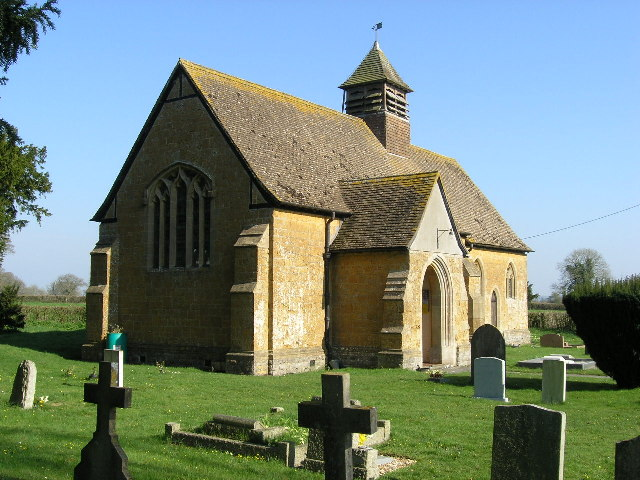

- Location within Somerset
- 51.1132°N 2.6152°W
- Location: Lottisham, West Bradley, Somerset, England

History
- Built: 1876

Site notes
- Architect: Thomas Graham Jackson

Listed Building – Grade II*
- Official name: Church of St Mary
- Designated: 17 October 1985
- Reference no.: 1058792

The Anglican Church of St Mary in Lottisham, West Bradley, Somerset, England, was built in 1876. It is a Grade II* listed building.

== History ==
The church was built in 1876 by Thomas Graham Jackson who also built the Church of St Peter at Hornblotton within the same parish.

The parish is part of the benefice of Baltonsborough with Butleigh, West Bradley and West Pennard within the Diocese of Bath and Wells.

== Architecture ==
The stone building is of Blue Lias with Hamstone dressings in an arts and crafts interpretation of Decorated Gothic architecture.

The building has a tile roof and small bellcote. It consists of two-bay nave, and chancel. The interior is also decorated in an Arts and Crafts style.

In the churchyard are two graves of those who died in World War II.

== See also ==
- List of ecclesiastical parishes in the Diocese of Bath and Wells
