= West Pennard Court Barn =

Grade I listed building in Mendip, UK

Court Barn
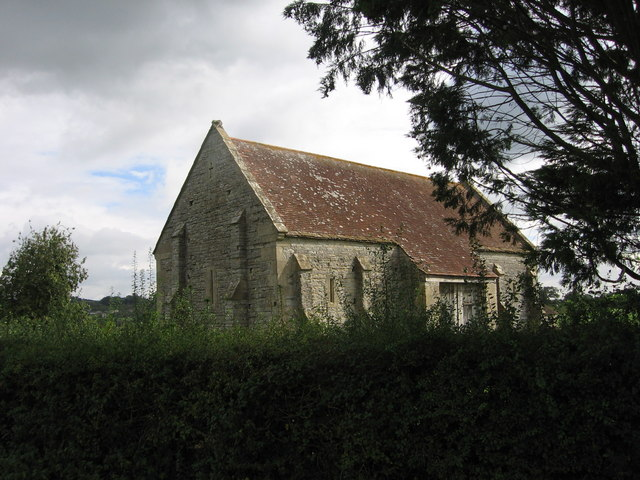

- Location within Somerset
- 51°07′51″N 2°38′56″W
- Location: West Bradley, Somerset, England

History
- Built: 15th century

Listed Building – Grade I
- Official name: Court Barn, West Bradley
- Designated: 2 June 1961
- Reference no.: 1175792

West Pennard Court Barn (which is also known as the Court Barn, West Bradley) is a late 14th or early 15th century tithe barn which was built for Glastonbury Abbey. The Grade I listed building is between West Pennard and West Bradley in the English county of Somerset.

The barn was restored by the Society for the Protection of Ancient Buildings in the 1930s following the collapse of the roof and then given to the National Trust. At 50 feet (15 m) long and 20 feet 6 inches (6.25 m) wide it is the smallest of the barns associated with the abbey. It has a cruck braced timber framed roof and is supported by two-stage buttresses.

== History ==
The barn which was originally known as Parson's Barn, was built on the orders of the Abbot of Glastonbury Abbey in the late 14th or early 15th century. There is no written record of the exact date and there is some debate about the likely age of the building based on the architectural features. Along with several others barns it was used to collect the tithes or dues to the abbey, often one tenth of a farm's produce. It fell within the hundred of Glaston Twelve Hides which was named after the hides who gave food rent to Glastonbury Abbey. The West Pennart Court Barn is the smallest of those which survive.

A survey in 1932 found that the roof was cracked and it eventually collapsed in 1935. In 1936 the roof structure was straightened, preserving the medieval trusses where possible, and covered with clay tiles. The restoration was undertaken by the Society for the Protection of Ancient Buildings, with the work being funded by Roger Clark of the local shoemakers C. & J. Clark who bought the derelict barn for £5. It has been owned by the National Trust since 1938. Designation as a Grade I listed building first took place in 1961. A survey in 2002 found minor repairs were needed to the doors and wall plate.

== Architecture ==
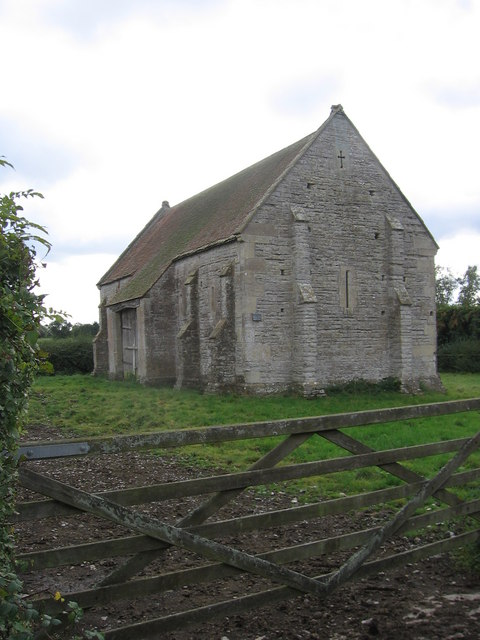
The barn showing the buttresses and (at top) croix pommée ventilation.

The rectangular five-bay barn is 50 feet (15 m) long and 20 feet 6 inches (6.25 m) wide, although it was previously larger. The middle bay is slightly longer than the others because of the central porches. The barn is built of local Blue Lias stone with some better quality oolitic ashlar used for the quoins on the corners and the porches which provided cover for goods being loaded and unloaded at the doors. It is supported by two-stage buttresses reaching to three quarters of the height of the walls. Each of the side walls has ventilation slits, or breathers, with those in the end walls being in the shape of a croix pommée. The barn originally had an attached dovecote on the western end, and still has niches for birds inside the barn and on the east gable wall. The dovecote was adapted into a calf shed.

The roof was originally thatched but now is tiled, and is supported by cruck bracing to the timber frame of six principal trusses. The design of the roof is similar to that in the other tithe barns of Glastonbury Abbey at Pilton, Manor Farm, Doulting and Glastonbury itself, which is now part of the Somerset Rural Life Museum. The carriage porch where wagons would have been unloaded is covered by the sloping roof.

== See also ==
- Grade I listed buildings in Mendip
- List of National Trust properties in Somerset
