= St John's Priory, Wells =

St John's Priory
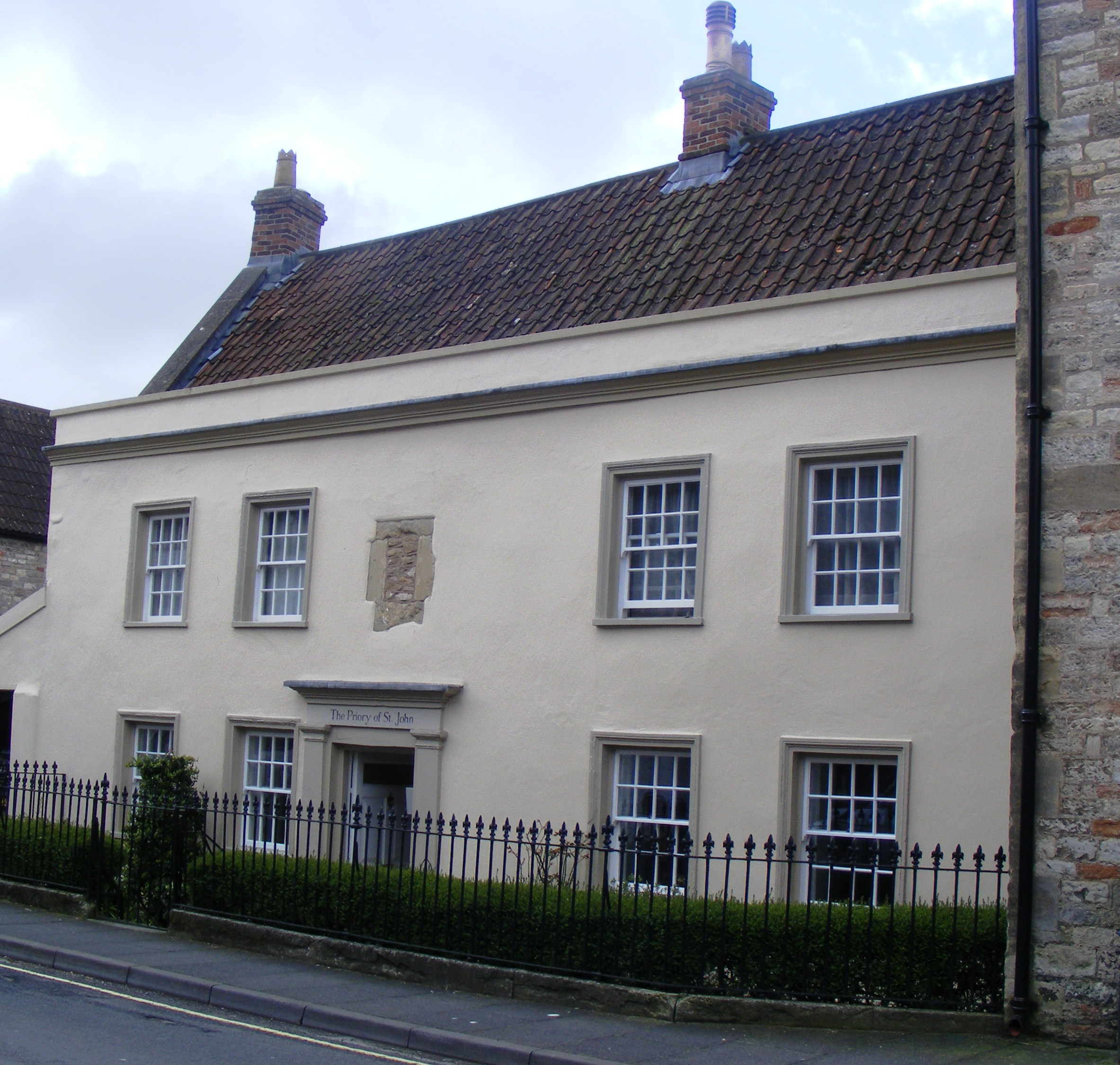

- Location within Somerset
- 51°12′21″N 2°38′52″W
- Location: Wells, Somerset, England

History
- Built: Late 14th century

Listed Building – Grade I
- Official name: St John's Priory With Front Boundary Wall and Railings
- Designated: 12 November 1953
- Reference no.: 1383115

St John's Priory in Wells, Somerset, England, from the 14th century. Along with its boundary walls and railings it has been designated as a Grade I listed building.

The initial development was as a hospital for poor, aged and sick men by 1210. The original foundation was by Jocelin of Wells, after his consecration in 1204, along with his brother Hugh of Wells.

It was made into a priory in 1350 providing accommodation for a prior, chaplain and ten brothers, which lasted until the dissolution of the monasteries when it had an income of £40 per year. It then became crown property until 1575 when it was given to Sir Christopher Hatton and later became the property of Baron Brooke.

Land was donated to St John's in both 1667 and 1716.

The former priory building may also have been used as a guest house for visitors to Wells Cathedral and the Bishop's Palace. There was a cemetery associated with the building. The history of the buildings is set out in 33 deeds including one from 1738 which is displayed in the dining room.

The land surrounding the priory was disturbed and remaining archaeological remains destroyed around 1850 when new roads and a school were built on the site. This also involved demolition of some of the building. In the 1860s the building was owned by the Lovell family.

The two-storey stone building was an open hall but a first floor corridor and bedrooms have been added. The roof is supported by cruck trusses and purlins. Dendochronology has shown the wood used for the roof was felled in the winter of 1313 to 1314.

== See also ==
- List of Grade I listed buildings in Mendip
