= George Hotel and Pilgrims' Inn, Glastonbury =

Grade I listed pub in Glastonbury, England

George Hotel and Pilgrims' Inn
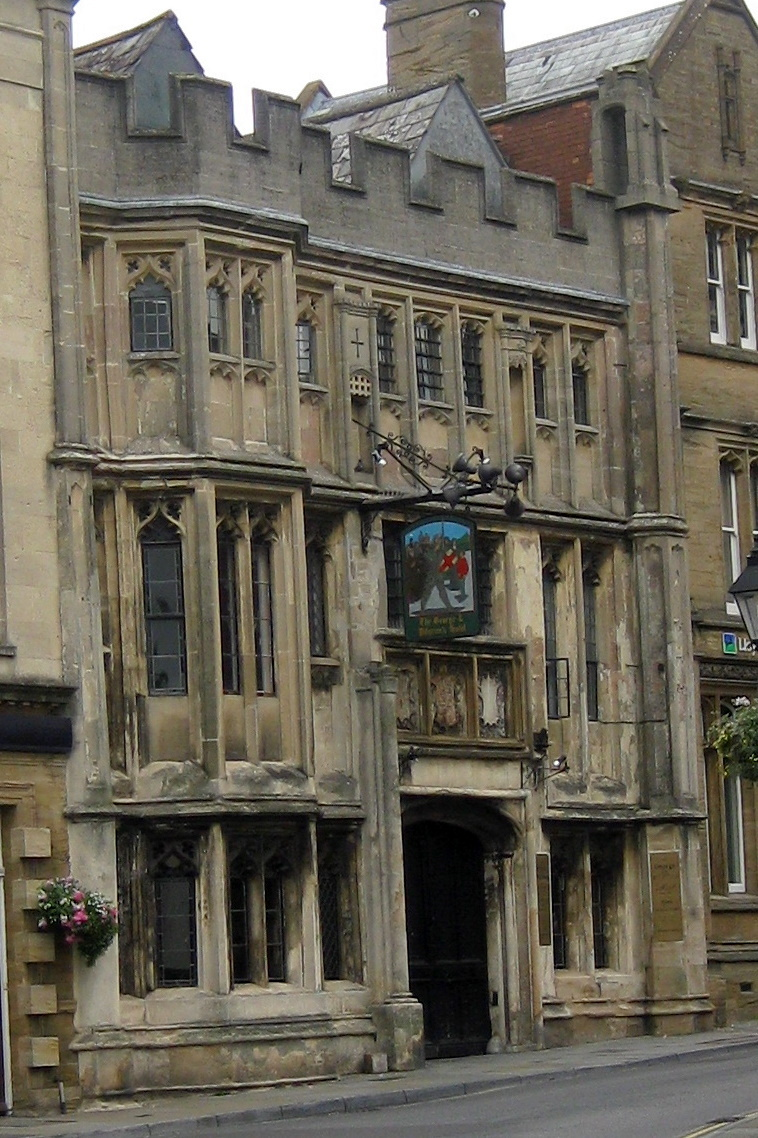
- Main façade of the building in 2009.

- Location within Somerset

General information
- Type: Late medieval courtyard inn
- Location: Glastonbury, England
- Coordinates: 51.1462°N 2.7098°W
- Completed: c.1475

Listed Building – Grade I
- Official name: George Hotel Pilgrims Inn
- Designated: 21 June 1950
- Reference no.: 1345455

The George Hotel and Pilgrims' Inn in Glastonbury, Somerset, England, was built in the late 15th century to accommodate visitors to Glastonbury Abbey. It has been designated as a Grade I listed building. It is claimed to be the oldest purpose built public house in the South West of England.

Having once been the Pilgrims' Inn of Glastonbury Abbey, by the mid-nineteenth century the building was known as the George Hotel. The current name preserves both. The first record of the building is from 1439 when the tenant was N. Kynge. In 1493 Abbot John Selwood gave a "new" building to the abbey chamberlain. After the Dissolution of the Monasteries it became the property of the Duke of Somerset. By 1562, when a 21-year lease on the building was taken out by George Cowdrey, it was described as "in such great ruin that it is likely that in default of repair within a few years the rent will not be answered" but included "six featherbeds". In 1658 the property was divided and a horsemill installed to grind malt. The building was also used for meetings and inquiries for example by Royal Commissioners (in 1672) and the Quakers (in 1691).

The front of the three-storey building is divided into three tiers of panels with traceried heads. Above the right of centre entrance arch are three carved panels bearing the coats of arms of the Abbey and of King Edward IV. The building is panelled and stone faced, with the stone work resembling that normally created in wood at the time of its construction. The stone columns reflect the arrangement of halls and chambers within the building. In front of the roof gables is a crenellated parapet with a small bell tower above. The interior includes a stone newel staircase and beneath the bar are large cellars.

It is believed to be haunted.

== See also ==
- List of Grade I listed buildings in Mendip
