= The Old Deanery, Wells =

The Old Deanery
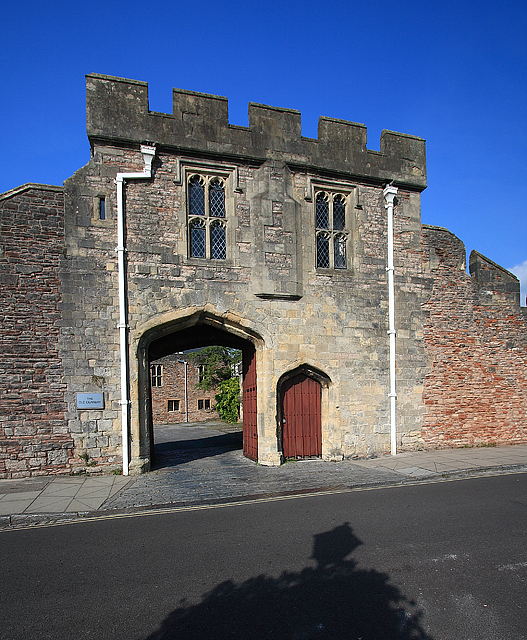
- The Gatehouse of The Old Deanery

Additional information
Location within Somerset
51°12′35″N 2°38′21″W
| Type | Deanery |
| Location | Wells, Somerset |
History
| Built | 12th century |
Site notes
| Architectural style | Mediaeval |
Listed Building – Grade I
| Official name | The Old Deanery |
| Designated | 12 November 1952 |
| Reference no. | 1382906 |
Listed Building – Grade I
| Official name | Old Deanery Court With Link Wall Along East Side |
| Designated | 12 November 1953 |
| Reference no. | 1382907 |
Listed Building – Grade I
| Official name | Gatehouse and South Boundary Wall to The Old Deanery |
| Designated | 12 November 1953 |
| Reference no. | 1382908 |

The Old Deanery of Wells Cathedral in Wells, Somerset, England, dates from the 12th century. Along with the gatehouse and boundary walls has been designated as a Grade I listed building. It was used as the primary residence for the Dean of the Cathedral (who enjoyed a short commute across the city green) between the years 1230 and 1958, after which it became office and the administrative centre for the Diocese of Bath and Wells until 2020, when the building was placed up for sale. As of 2022 the building is now under private ownership, and is a private residence.

The 12th-century building, on Cathedral Green, was largely rebuilt in the late 15th century by Dean Gunthorpe. It was further remodelled and the south range refenestrated by Dean Bathurst in the late 17th century. The two storey south front of the building looking out over the green to the cathedral has six bays which contain 17th century sash windows.

It is no longer the home of the Dean and served as offices for the Diocese of Bath and Wells and provided a resource centre for Christian Education for the diocese. Extensive rebuilding work since 1989 has included the insertion of an oak staircase and addition of a first floor above the education department. The diocesan offices were moved out of the Old Deanery and in 2020 the building was placed up for sale.

William Turner when he was dean between 1551 and 1568, established a herb garden. The garden was recreated between 2003 and 2010.

In April 2022, a bid was accepted for the property from a private buyer, and in September 2022 a planning permission application was submitted to return the building to private residential use. As of March 2023 this planning application was approved, and the building is, once again, a private residence.

== See also ==
- List of Grade I listed buildings in Mendip
