= St Mary's Church, Meare =

Church in Somerset, England

Church of St Mary
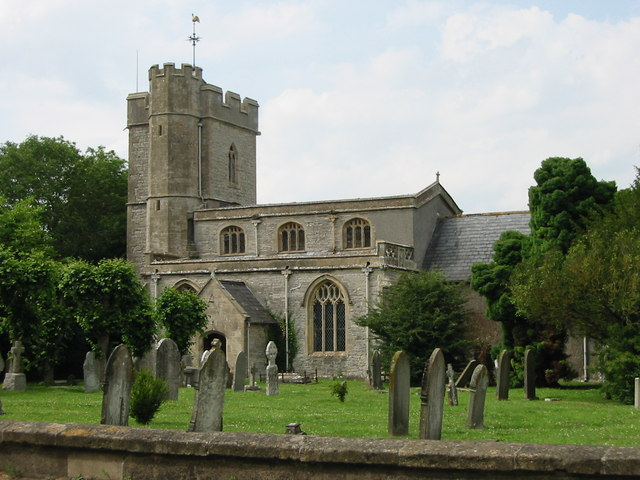

- Location within Somerset

General information
- Location: Meare, England
- Coordinates: 51.1718°N 2.7789°W
- Completed: 1323

The Church of St Mary in Meare, Somerset, England, was formerly in the keeping of Glastonbury Abbey, and dates from 1323. It was built for Abbot Adam of Sodbury, and is a Grade I listed building.

There is a legend that the church was built on the site of a cell of the monk Saint Beonna (also Benen or Beon), who was later confused with Benignus of Armagh, between the 5th and 9th centuries. His remains was moved to Glastonbury Abbey in 1091.

The current chancel and tower date from the building's construction in 1323 when it was consecrated by John Droxford, the Bishop of Bath and Wells. Around 1470 the nave was rebuilt by Abbot John Selwood and the work completed by Abbot Richard Beere. The church has a 15th-century stone pulpit, wooden chest from 1705 and candelabra from 1777. The tower holds a peal of six bells.

The parish is part of the benefice of Glastonbury St John the Baptist and St Benedict with Meare, which is part of the Glastonbury deanery.

== See also ==
- List of Grade I listed buildings in Mendip
- List of towers in Somerset
- List of ecclesiastical parishes in the Diocese of Bath and Wells
