= Church of St John the Baptist, Pilton =

Church in Somerset, England

Church of St John the Baptist
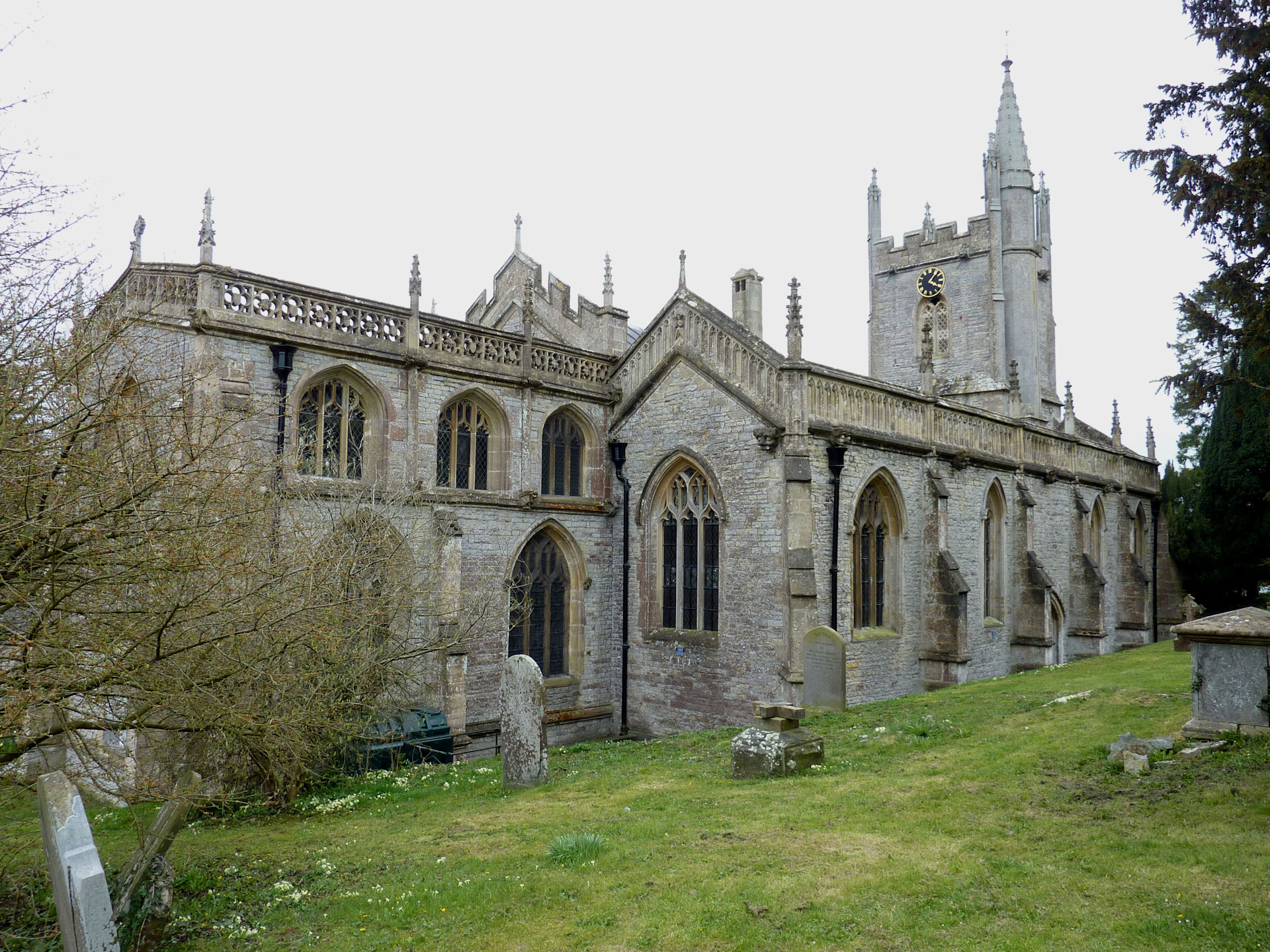

- Location within Somerset

General information
- Location: Pilton, England
- Coordinates: 51.1650°N 2.5898°W
- Completed: 11th century

The Church of St John the Baptist in Pilton, Somerset, England, dates from the 11th century and has been designated as a Grade I listed building.

The present Norman and Medieval structure, may stand on the site of an earlier wattle and daub church built by the early missionaries.

In 2011 a new lighting system was installed at a cost of £17,000 with financial support from Glastonbury Festival and Viridor Landfill Communities Fund.

The Anglican parish is part of the benefice of Pilton with Croscombe, North Wootton and Dinder within the archdeaconry of Wells.

== See also ==
- List of Grade I listed buildings in Mendip
- List of towers in Somerset
- List of ecclesiastical parishes in the Diocese of Bath and Wells
