= Tithe Barn, Pilton =

Historic building at Cumhill Farm in Pilton, Somerset, England

Tithe Barn
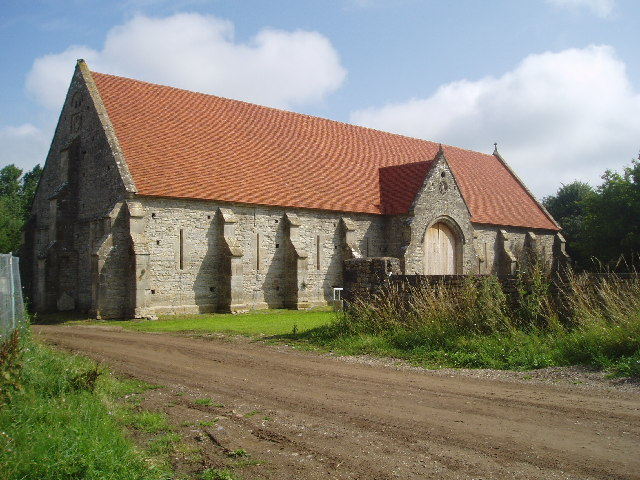

- Location within Somerset

General information
- Location: Pilton, Somerset, England
- Coordinates: 51.1634°N 2.5891°W
- Completed: 14th century
- Client: Glastonbury Abbey

The Tithe Barn at Cumhill Farm in Pilton, Somerset, England, was built in the 14th century as a tithe barn to hold produce for Glastonbury Abbey. It is a Grade I listed building and Scheduled Ancient Monument.

The barn, of coursed and squared rubble, was originally built in the 14th and 15th centuries to hold the produce from farms in the area who paid one tenth (tithe) of their produce to Glastonbury Abbey as the landowner. It is one of four surviving monastic barns built by the Abbey, the others being the Tithe Barn, Manor Farm, Doulting, the West Pennard Court Barn and the Glastonbury tithe barn, now the Somerset Rural Life Museum.

During the Second World War, farms in Pilton were used to train the Women's Land Army, including Cumhill Farm and the medieval barn.

Despite being commonly referred to as the tithe barn, little evidence exists to suggest the barn actually stored tithes. It is possible that it was instead built to store produce farmed from land owned by Glastonbury Abbey, rather than that offered as tithes, but may have stored tithes at a later date. Literature produced by the Pilton Barn Trust in the 1990s referred to it as "Pilton Barn" or the "Abbey Barn" and in 1963 a reverend local to the area claimed in the Cheddar Valley Gazette that another barn, since demolished, was actually responsible for storing tithe payments in the village.

== Restoration ==
On 9 June 1963 lightning set fire to the thatched roof, and it remained a wreck until Michael Eavis, organiser of the Glastonbury Festival, bought it in 1995, and presented the barn to the Pilton Barn Trust.

The project was made possible with a grant of £400,000 from English Heritage. The Glastonbury festival contributed a further £100,000.

A new roof structure replicating the original, using a combination of traditional carpentry techniques and modern technology, has been built by Peter McCurdy, with skills used when recreating the Globe theatre in London, from English oak which came from Northumberland. The roof frame consists of a cruck construction which sits high in the walls, with an arcade plate then carrying the apex of the roof above.

McCurdy was also assisted by a local team run by Jon Maine who designed and erected the complex scaffolding both internally and externally, and then used 8000 36"-long oak hand-split (riven) battens to tile the roof with over 30,000 hand-made plain tiles.

In addition to the new roof a new floor was laid, including a 3 metres (10 ft) wide strip in Blue Lias Stone and 44 cubic metres of lime concrete used to fill the expanses either side. It is said to be the largest expanse of lime concrete flooring anywhere in Europe.

The restoration was nominated for the annual Wood Awards, which recognise and encourage outstanding design, craftmanship and installation in joinery and structures in wood. It was awarded the prize as the Best Use of British Timber Award and Structural Timber Award in 2005. It also received the Royal Institute of British Architects Town and Country Design Award in the same year.

It was officially opened on Friday 1 April 2005 by local historian Sir John Keegan, and is now used for public events such as medieval fairs, dances, weddings, parties, Somerset Arts Week and village events.

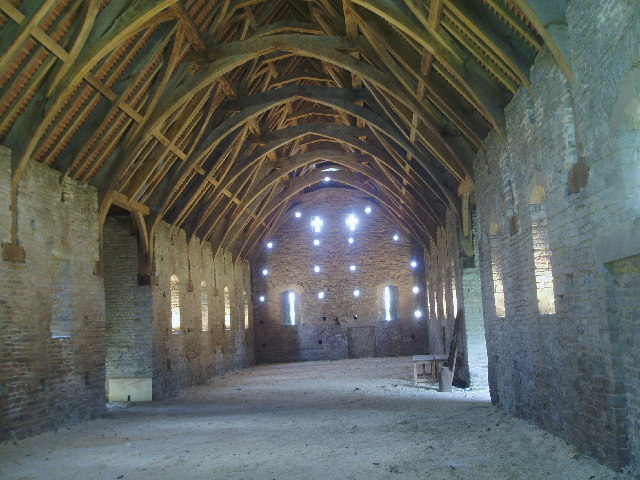
Interior of the barn
