= The Old Manor, Croscombe =

Building in Croscombe, Somerset, England

The Old Manor
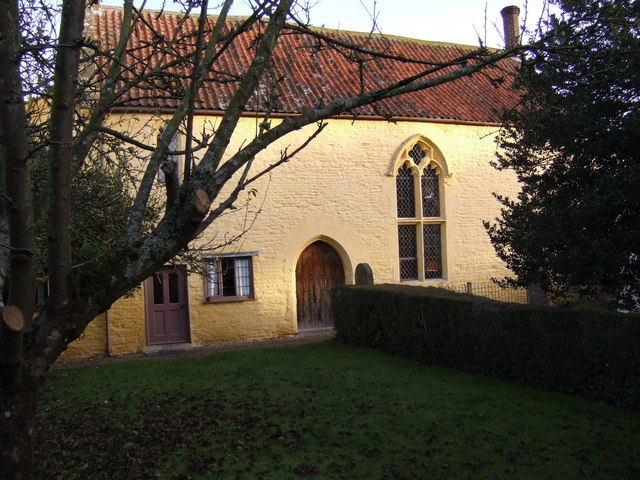

- Location within Somerset

General information
- Location: Croscombe, England
- Coordinates: 51.1966°N 2.5843°W
- Construction started: 1460
- Completed: 1489

The Old Manor in Croscombe, Somerset, England, was built around 1460–89 as a rectorial manor house for Hugh Sugar, the Treasurer of Wells Cathedral. It was altered in the 16th and 18th centuries, and in the 20th century by the Landmark Trust. It has been designated as a Grade I listed building.

== See also ==
- Grade I listed buildings in Mendip
