= The Gatehouse, Baltonsborough =

House in Baltonsborough, Somerset, England

The Gatehouse
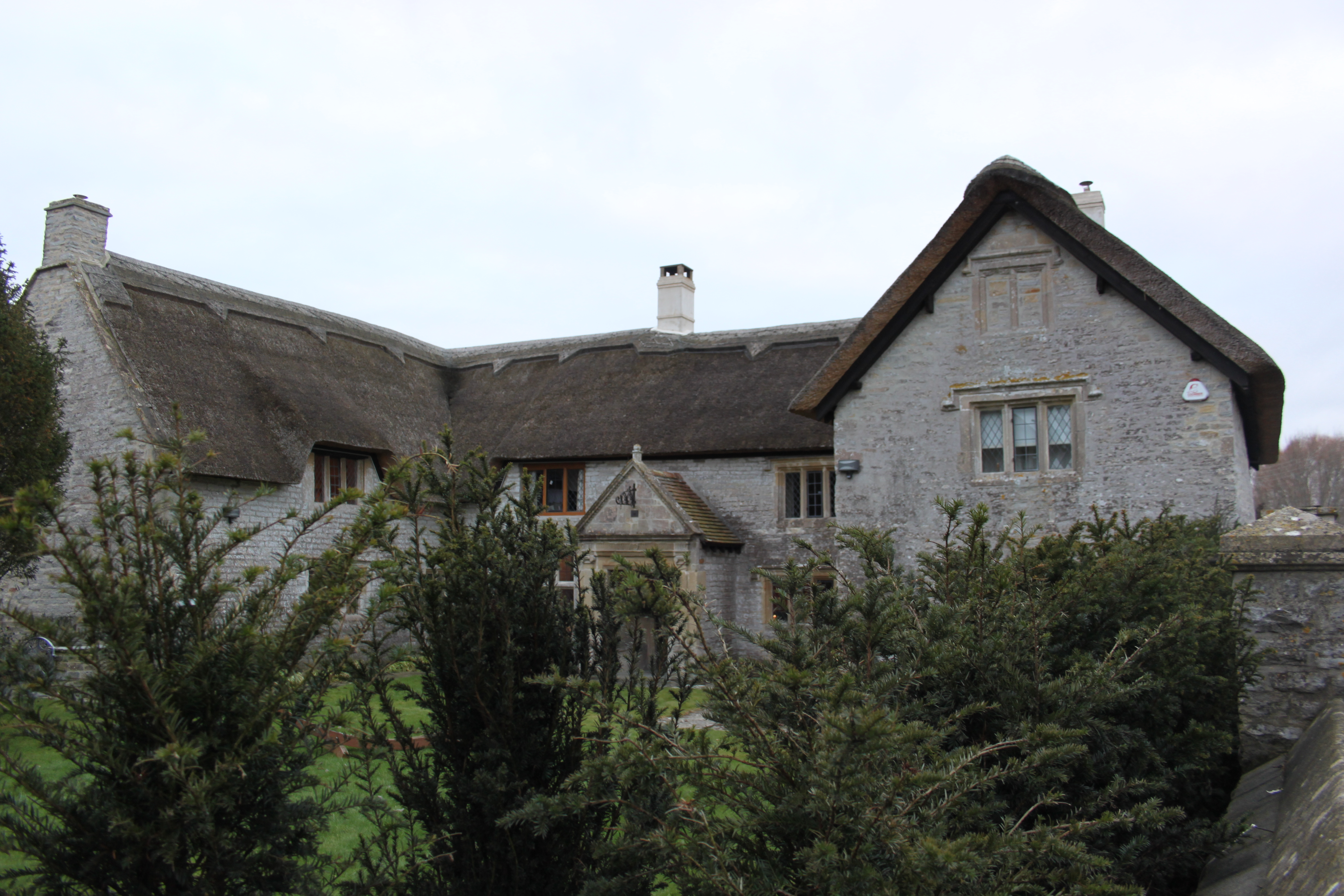

- Location within Somerset

General information
- Location: Baltonsborough, England
- Coordinates: 51.1098°N 2.6650°W
- Completed: 16th century

The Gatehouse in Baltonsborough, Somerset, England, is a thatched house dating from the 16th century. It has been designated a Grade I listed building.

The first house was built in the 15th century, however only two bays of this survive. The building was extended in the late 16th century when a chimney was added in the great hall. A wing was added to the north east of the main hall in the mid 17th century. In the 19th century it was converted into three cottagers but restored to a single house in the 20th century. It has a cruck roof which shows signs of blackening from the smoke of the earlier open fire.

The house is named after the "Gatehouse" family who lived there from 1699 until 1839. It remained part of their estate until 1947.

== See also ==
- List of Grade I listed buildings in Mendip
