= Ammerdown House =

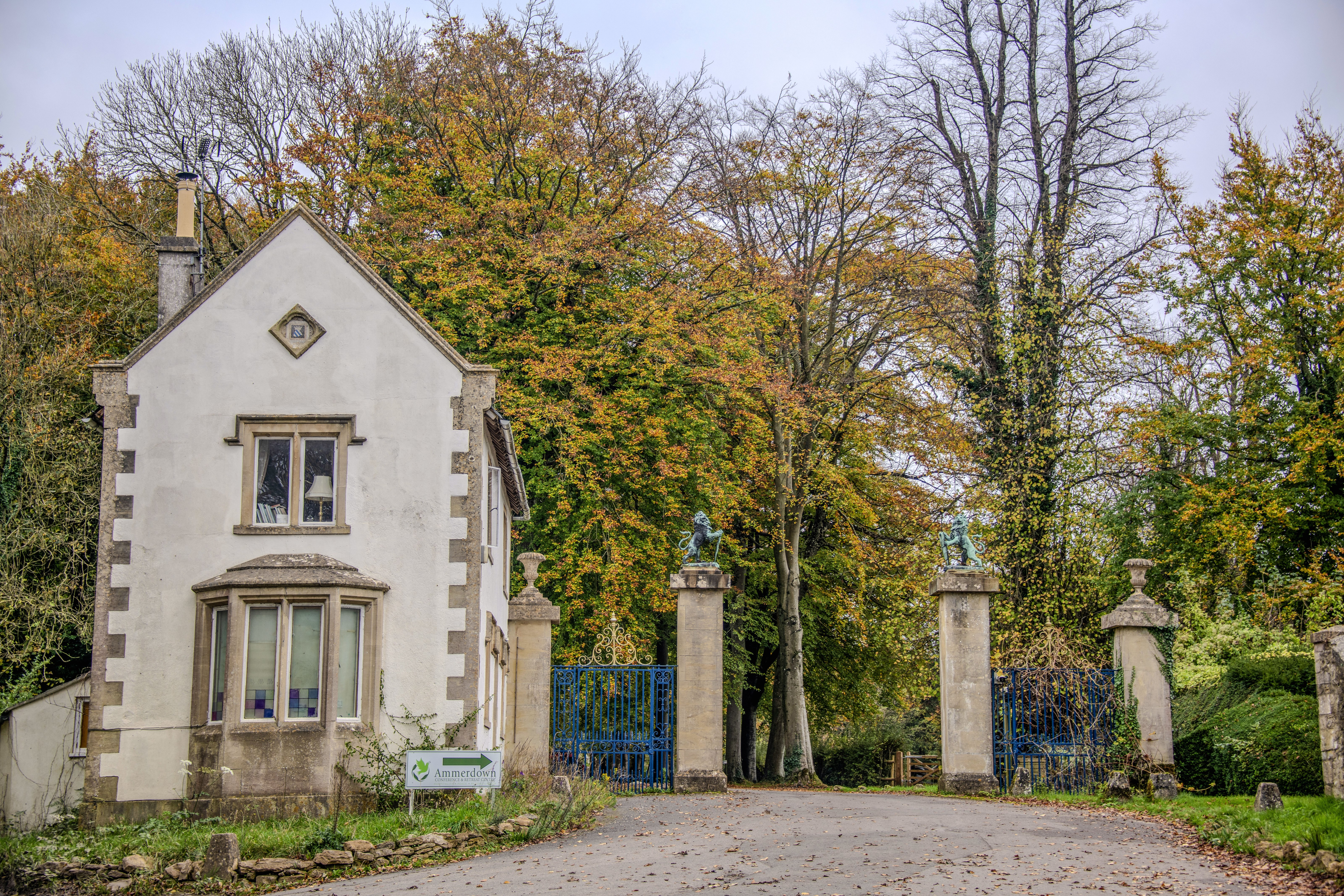
- The gateway to Ammerdown House

- Location within Somerset
- 51°16′21″N 2°24′56″W
- Location: Kilmersdon, Somerset, England

History
- Built: 1788

Site notes
- Architect: James Wyatt

Listed Building – Grade I
- Official name: Ammerdown House and stables now known as Ammerdown Study Centre
- Designated: 11 March 1968
- Reference no.: 1058685

National Register of Historic Parks and Gardens
- Official name: Ammerdown House
- Type: Grade II*
- Designated: 1 June 1984
- Reference no.: 1001136

Ammerdown House in Kilmersdon, Somerset, England, was built in 1788. It has been designated as Grade I listed building.

It was built as a country house with stables and an adjacent formal garden within landscaped parkland in emparked landscape by James Wyatt for Thomas Samuel Jolliffe. The house has been handed down through the Jolliffe family to William Jolliffe, a politician, who was made Baron Hylton in the mid-19th century; the house was enlarged in 1855 & 1877, with further alteration to the west front being undertaken in 1901, possibly by Sir Edwin Lutyens.

A pair of lodges, gate piers and gates, associated with Ammerdown House, which were also built in 1788–94 by James Wyatt, are Grade II* listed buildings and on the English Heritage Heritage at Risk Register. Since 1973 the stables have been significantly altered and converted into a study centre.

The orangery and walled garden were built around 1793.

In 1853 John Twyford Jolliffe & Thomas Robert Jolliffe, the children of the builder of the house, Thomas Samuel Jolliffe, built a 150-foot (46 m) high column, known as the Ammerdown Park Column, Ammerdown Lighthouse or the Jolliffe Column. It was a near replica of Eddystone Lighthouse with a glass dome or viewing lantern which could be illuminated. It is a Grade II* listed building. In the late 19th century a local quarry owner, John Turner of Faulkland, took out a lawsuit against his neighbour Hedworth Jolliffe, 2nd Baron Hylton who owned Ammerdown House in Kilmersdon. When Turner lost he erected a tower of around 180 feet (55 m) high to rival the column at Ammerdown, with a dance hall and tea garden at the base. When Turner died in 1894, Lord Hylton bought the structure to demolish it. The base and dance hall were converted into workers cottages and eventually demolished in 1969.

The gardens include gothic fountains and statues surrounded by mature yews nearly 4 metres (13.1 ft) high, hedging, Portugal laurels and honeysuckles trained over wired umbrellas. Spring colour is provided by daffodils, cowslips and magnolia with roses, dahlias and wild orchids flowering in the summer. The gardens are listed, Grade II*, on the Register of Historic Parks and Gardens of special historic interest in England.

The current residents of the house are Diana Jolliffe, daughter in law of the 5th Baron Hylton, the current Lord Hylton, and her children. The family estate covers many of the villages around including Kilmersdon, although much of the former residential property of the estate is run by a charitable housing association set up by the current Lord Hylton.

== See also ==
- Grade I listed buildings in Mendip
