= Southill House, Cranmore =

Manor house in Cranmore, Somerset, England

Southill House
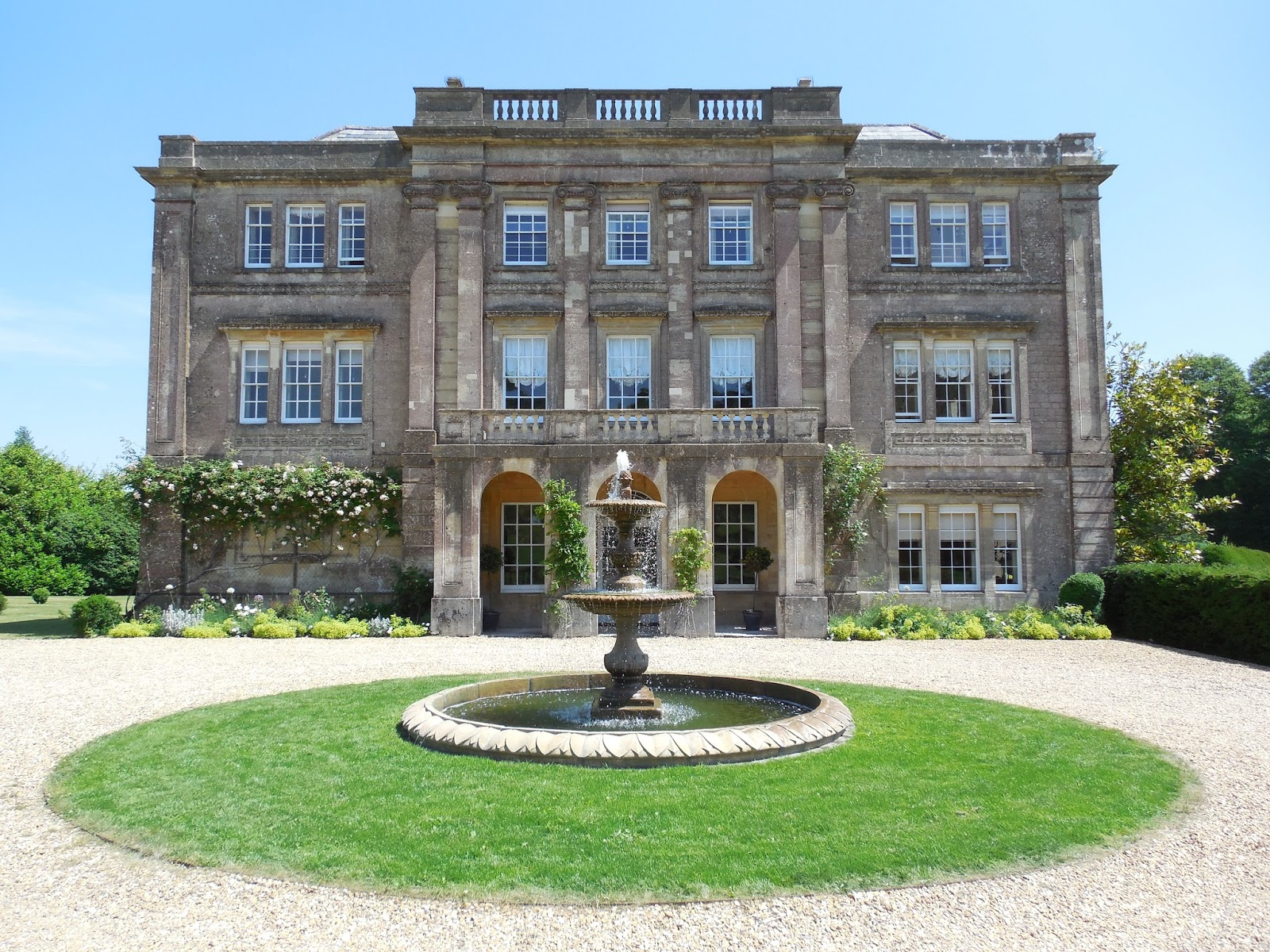

- Location within Somerset

General information
- Location: Cranmore, England
- Coordinates: 51.1819°N 2.4708°W
- Completed: Early 18th century

Southill House in Cranmore, Somerset, England, is an early 18th-century manor house. It was given a new facade by John Wood, the Younger, of Bath, in the late 18th century. It has been designated as a Grade I listed building.

The house is on a site which may have been used for Roman buildings including a hypocaust.

The current 18th-century building includes some remains from a 17th-century building,. standing in a landscaped park.

in World War II the house was used as a base for the Auxiliary Unit Scout Patrol.

The house received moderate publicity in 1998 when a "cow grazing near the croquet lawn" fell through the turf into a forgotten tunnel. The writings of a Victorian servant in the house, Edwin Charles Cox, revealed that the passages were said to be haunted but upon his exploration only contained remainder furniture.

In 2011 the house was short-listed in a competition run by Country Life magazine to find England's Favourite House and was chosen as the South West regional winner. The house was owned by the Cotterell family for over 10 years who then eventually sold the house to Stephen Ellis, a London banker.

== See also ==
- List of Grade I listed buildings in Mendip
