= Seymours Court Farmhouse, Beckington =

Farmhouse in Somerset, England

Seymours Court Farmhouse
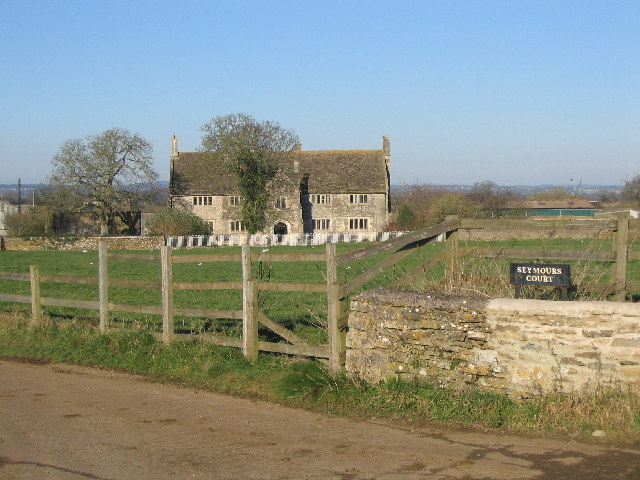

- Location within Somerset

General information
- Location: Beckington, England
- Coordinates: 51.2730°N 2.2702°W
- Completed: 15th century

Seymours Court Farmhouse in Beckington, Somerset, England, dates from the 15th century and is a Grade I listed building.

It was the home of Thomas Seymour, 1st Baron Seymour of Sudeley, who married Queen Catherine Parr.

== See also ==
- List of Grade I listed buildings in Mendip
