= St Mary's Church, Hardington =

Church in Somerset, England

Church of St Mary
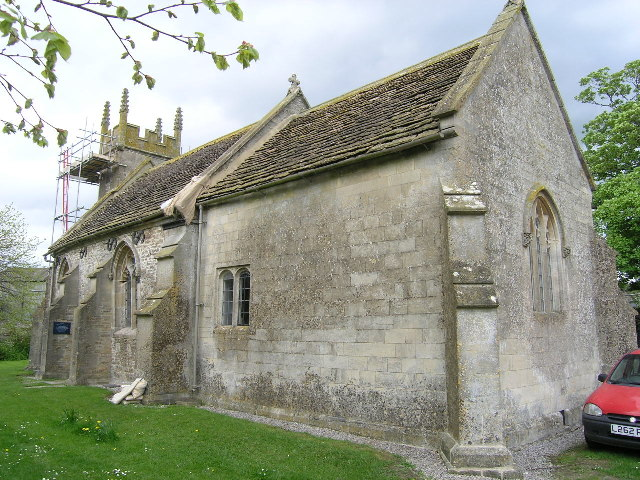

- Location within Somerset

General information
- Location: Hardington, England
- Coordinates: 51.2710°N 2.3691°W
- Completed: 11th century

The Church of St Mary at Hardington in the parish of Hemington, Somerset, England, dates from the 11th century and has been designated as a Grade I listed building.

The church has an un-aisled nave and small west tower which dates from the late 14th century. In the 19th century the earlier chancel was largely rebuilt. The parish of Hardington was formed in the Middle Ages and merged into Hemington in 1733.

It is no longer used as a church and has been in the care of the Churches Conservation Trust since 1972.

The interior of the church includes fragments of medieval wall paintings and a board painted with the arms of Charles I.

== See also ==
- Grade I listed buildings in Mendip
- List of Somerset towers
