= The Bishop's Barn, Wells =

Barn in Somerset, England

The Bishop's Barn
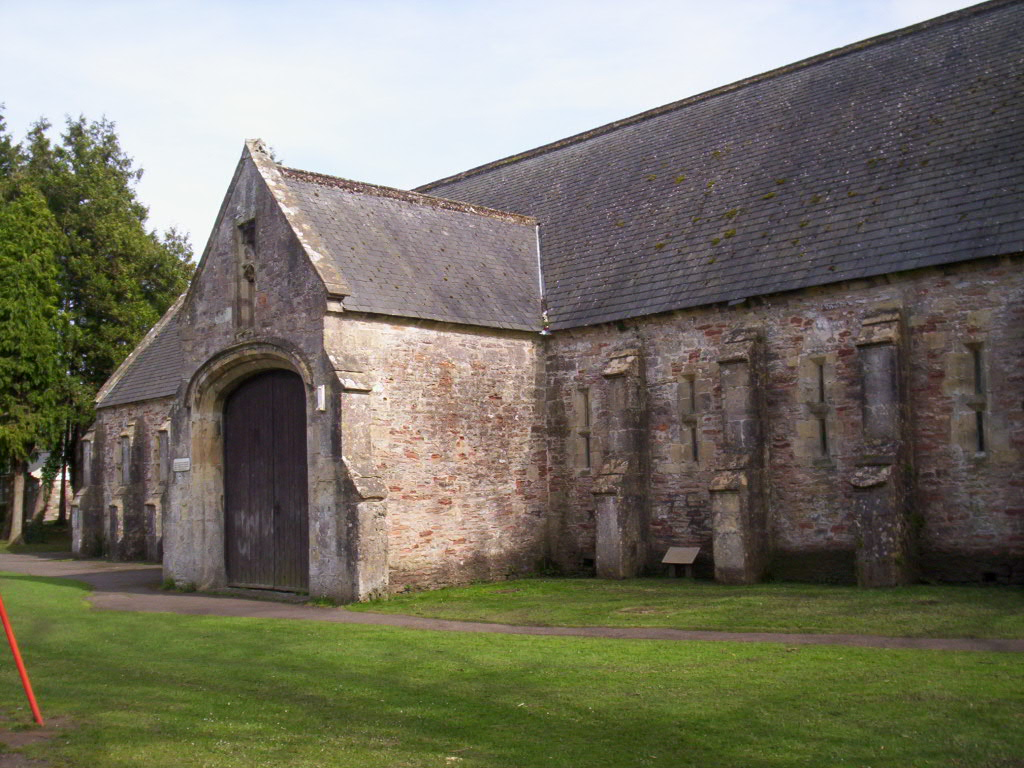

- Location within Somerset

General information
- Location: Wells, Somerset, Silver Street
- Coordinates: 51.2059°N 2.6435°W
- Completed: 15th century

The Bishop's Barn in Silver Street, Wells, Somerset, England, was built as a tithe barn in the 15th century. It has been designated as a Grade I listed building, and scheduled as an ancient monument.

It was built of local stone roughly squared, with Doulting ashlar dressings and a Westmorland slate roof. The barn has 12 bays with a cruck roof with double collar beams and arched wind braces.

Royalist troops were quartered in the barn during the Bloody Assizes. It 1887 the barn was given to the City of Wells by Bishop Lord Arthur Hervey for recreation and amusement.

During the 1970s the barn was used as a music venue, and hosted bands such as Supertramp, Status Quo and Slade, with audiences of up to 1,500. These bands were promoted at the venue by local Wells teenagers Gordon Poole and Tony Leach. It is now managed by the Wells Recreation Ground Trust. The barn and adjacent recreation ground can be booked for events.

In 2014 the Wells Recreation Ground Trust commissioned architects to survey the buildings and develop options for its repair and future use in conjunction with the Somerset Buildings Preservation Trust. The advisory group identified a plan for improvements to the barn, including the installation of central heating and repairs to the walls and roof, estimated to cost at least £400,000 over five years.
