= Church of St Mary Magdalene, Chewton Mendip =

Church in Somerset, England

Church of St Mary Magdalene
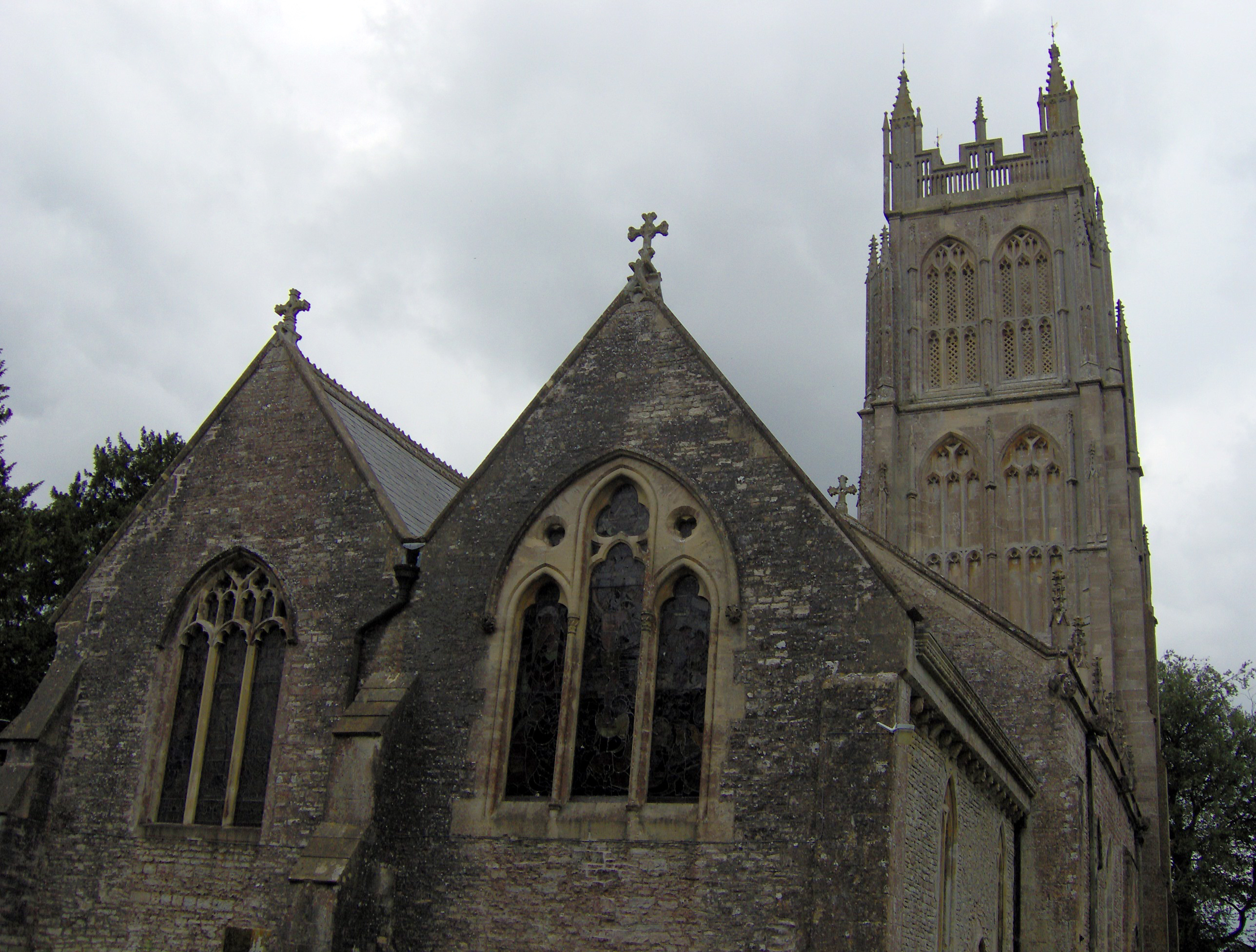

- Location within Somerset

General information
- Location: Chewton Mendip, England
- Coordinates: 51.2761°N 2.5799°W
- Completed: 1440s

The Church of St Mary Magdalene in Chewton Mendip, Somerset, England, was built in the 1540s and has been designated as a Grade I listed building. It is dedicated to Jesus' companion Mary Magdalene.

== History ==
The church has Saxon origins, with the register commencing in 560. Building work being undertaken in the 12th, 13th, 14th, 15th and 16th centuries with restoration in 1865. The current church, which was started in 1441 by Carthusian monks, incorporates several Norman features including the north doorway. The tower was added in 1541.

The church was a Saxon minster with subordinate chapels at Ston Easton, Emborough, Farrington Gurney and Paulton. The church was granted by William the Conqueror to the French Jumièges Abbey. After the confiscation of alien churches Henry V gave it to the Priory of Sheen in Surrey which held it until the Dissolution of the Monasteries.

Wade and Wade in their 1929 book "Somerset" described the church as a "singularly interesting church, which possesses one of the most stately towers in the county".

Their description continued

"The arrangement of double belfry windows in the two upper stages is unusual, and the conventional lines of the elaborately pierced parapet above are relieved by the projecting stair turret and spirelet. The general effect is rich and impressive. The figure of our Lord, surrounded by four pairs of adoring angels, over the W. doorway should also be observed (cp. Batcombe). In the body of the church note should be taken of the good Norm. doorway forming the N. entrance. The interior is remarkable for an ugly bit of mediaeval vandalism. To render the altar observable from all parts of the church, a Norm. triplet, which once formed the chancel arch, has been mutilated; a pointed arch has been inserted, and the corner of the S. wall pared away. The chancel contains the only extant specimen in Somerset of a frid stool, a rough seat let into the sill of the N. window of the sacrarium for the accommodation of anyone claiming sanctuary. Note (1) piscinas of different dates in chancel; (2) change of design in arcading of nave, showing subsequent lengthening of church — the earlier columns stand on Norm. bases; (3) rood-loft doorway and ancient pulpit stairs near modern pulpit; (4) Jacobean lectern and Bible of 1611. The "Bonville" chantry, S. of chancel, contains a 15th-cent. altar-tomb with recumbent effigies of Sir H. Fitzroger and wife, and a modern mural tablet with medallion to Viscountess Waldegrave. In the churchyard is a weather-worn but fine cross, with a canopied crucifix. The Communion plate is pre-Reformation, dating from 1511."

The parish is part of the benefice of East Harptree with West Harptree and Hinton Blewett, Litton with Chewton Mendip within the archdeaconry of Wells.

== Architecture ==
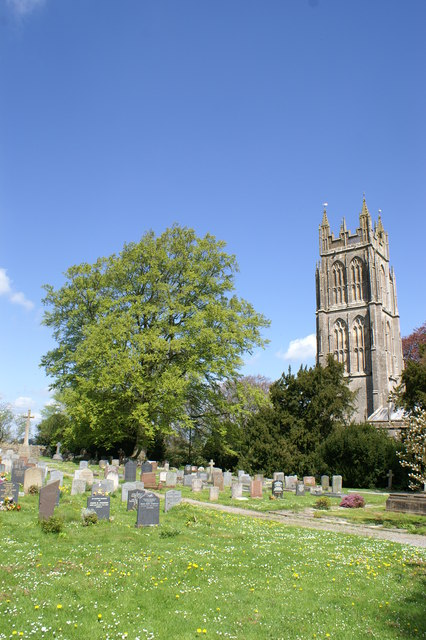
The churchyard and churchyard cross

The church is made of Lias Stone, with a 126-foot (38 m) tower of Doulting Stone which was "unfinished" in 1541. The tower, which dates from around 1540, contains a bell dating from 1753 and made by Thomas Bilbie of the Bilbie family. In addition, there is a peal of eight bells by Taylor's of Loughborough.

Near the altar, there is a stone seat for criminals taking sanctuary in the church.

== Ornaments ==
Near the altar is a stone seat, known as a 'frid' for those, especially criminals, who took sanctuary in the church. The church includes monuments to Sir Henry Fitzroger and his wife who died in 1388, and to Frances, Lady Waldegrave (1879). The Waldegrave family have owned Chewton from 1553, but did not live in the village until the 1860s.

The stained glass is largely from the 19th century, but some 15th-century and earlier fragments remain in the chancel window. The glass in the north window of the chancel comes from various sources. The design of the virgin weeping was found in pieces in a ditch near Glastonbury. They were bought by the Rev. Paul Bush who used them to make a window in his summerhouse which was eventually pulled down. When the old vicarage was sold in 1956 the glass was found in the garden and shown to Christopher Woodforde the Dean of Wells. He identified some fragments as being 19th century but others as being much older possibly 13th or 14th century. Jasper Kettlewell combined them with existing glass in the window into new designs.

There are three piscinae, two medieval chests and 16th-century carved bench ends. The circular Early English font stands under the tower.

== Churchyard cross ==
A 15th-century stone cross in the churchyard also has Grade I listed building status.

== See also ==
- List of ecclesiastical parishes in the Diocese of Bath and Wells
