= Manor Farmhouse Gatehouse, Whatley =

Manor Farmhouse Gatehouse
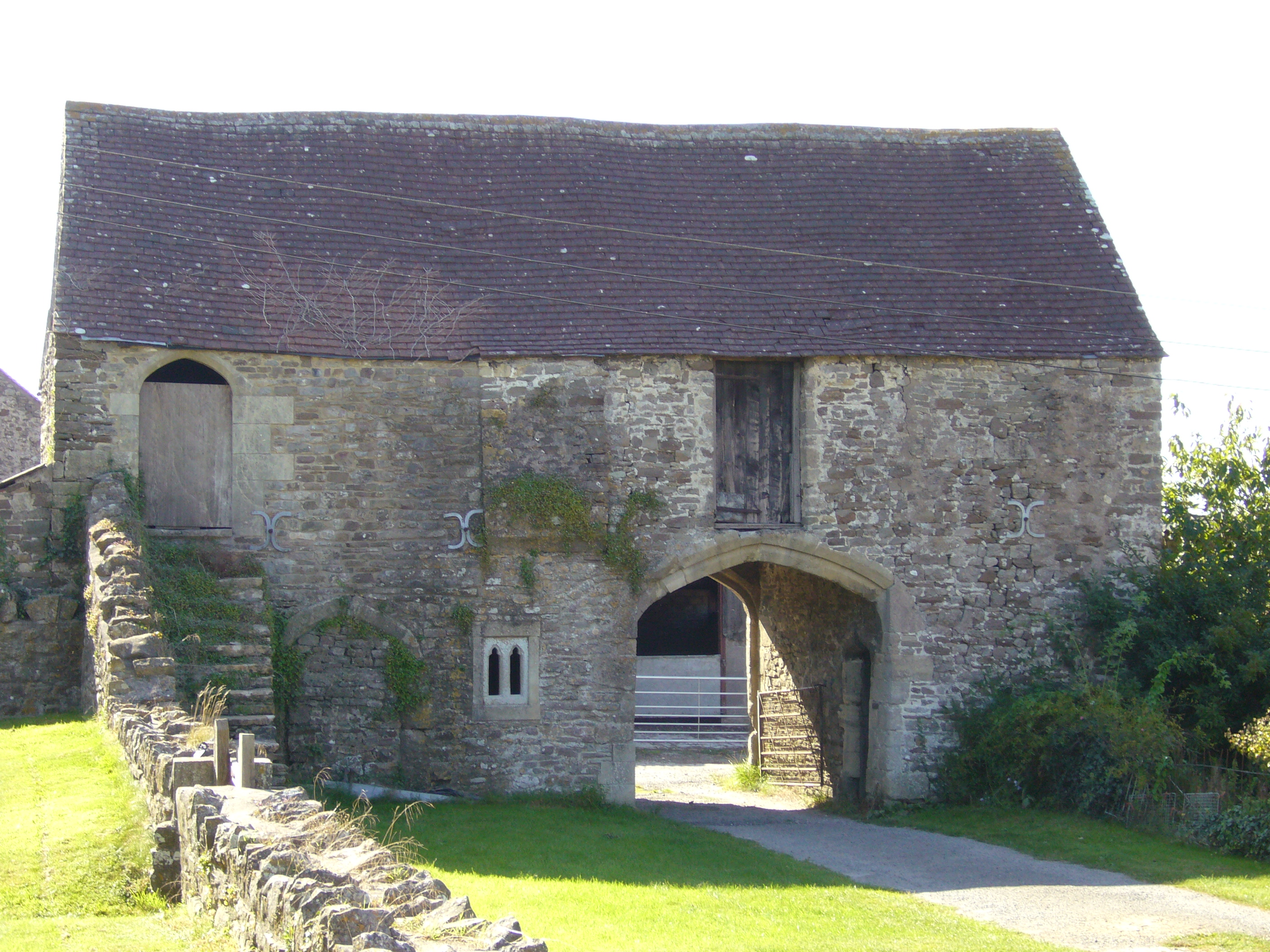

- Location within Somerset
- 51°13′37″N 2°23′0″W
- Location: Whatley, Somerset, England

History
- Built: c. 1500

Listed Building – Grade I
- Official name: Gatehouse to West of Manor Farmhouse
- Designated: 11 March 1968
- Reference no.: 1175158

The Manor Farmhouse Gatehouse in Whatley, Somerset, England, was built around 1500 and has been designated as a Grade I listed building.

The two-storey stone building of four bays still has it original roof trusses including an arch braced cruck. The archways are original, with one having carved spandrels. At the back of the building entry is via a set of stone steps to a first floor doorway.

The structure has been placed on the Heritage at Risk Register because of structural movement to the south gable and weak stonework. There is also damage from vegetation.

Manor Farm is closely associated with the Church Of St George which is Grade II* listed.

== See also ==
- List of Grade I listed buildings in Mendip
