= St Peter's Church, Hornblotton =

Church in Somerset, England

Church of St Peter
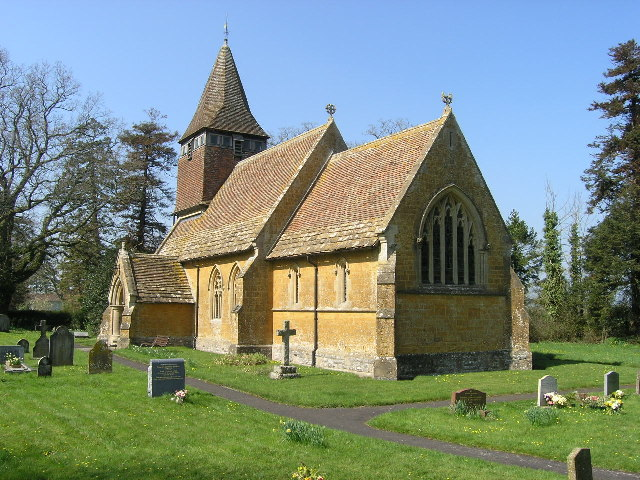

- Location within Somerset

General information
- Location: Hornblotton, England
- Coordinates: 51.1046°N 2.5835°W
- Completed: 1874

The Church of St Peter at Hornblotton in the parish of West Bradley, Somerset, England, was built in 1872–74 by Sir Thomas Graham Jackson, for the rector, Godfrey Thring replacing a medieval church on the same site. It is a Grade I listed building,

The Victorian building is on the site of an earlier church which had fallen into disrepair, from which a stump of the tower remains in the churchyard. The piscina and a memorial in the vestry, were reused from the original church.

One of the features of the church is an early electric clock and the first in England to have a striking mechanism. It was controlled from a master clock in the nearby house. The clock mechanism was taken to the Science Museum in London for restoration in 1984. It was made by Charles Shepherd who also made the Shepherd Gate Clock mounted on the wall outside the gate of the Royal Greenwich Observatory.

The interior walls of the church are decorated with sgraffito which is produced by applying layers of plaster tinted in contrasting colours to a moistened surface, or in ceramics, by applying to an unfired ceramic body two successive layers of contrasting slip, and then in either case scratching so as to produce an outline drawing. The decoration includes representations of Moses, Isaiah, Jeremiah and the Annunciation. The technique is attributed to the Arts and Crafts Movement and, at Hornblotton, have been created by cutting away the upper coat of white cement and leaving exposed the strawberry coloured undercoat of plaster including terracotta patterns of sunflowers and leaves.

The parish is part of the Six Pilgrims benefice within the deanery of Bruton and Cary.

== See also ==
- Grade I listed buildings in Mendip
- List of Somerset towers
- List of ecclesiastical parishes in the Diocese of Bath and Wells
