= West Bradley =

Village in Somerset, England

Coordinates: 51.12604°N 2.63727°W

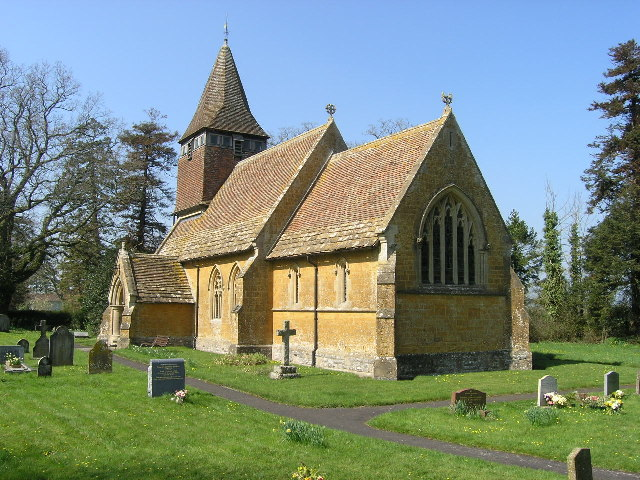
- St Peter's Church, Hornblotton

- Location within Somerset
- Population: 277 (2011)
- OS grid reference: ST555365
- Unitary authority: Somerset Council
- Ceremonial county: Somerset
- Region: South West
- Country: England
- Sovereign state: United Kingdom
- Post town: GLASTONBURY
- Postcode district: BA6
- Dialling code: 01458
- Police: Avon and Somerset
- Fire: Devon and Somerset
- Ambulance: South Western
- UK Parliament: Frome and East Somerset

West Bradley is a village and civil parish 4 miles south-east of Glastonbury in Somerset, England. The parish includes the hamlets of Hornblotton and Lottisham.

Hornblotton Green is a traditional English community with a small village hall. There are no shops in Hornblotton although there are three working farms, and a beautiful Victorian arts and crafts style church. The village is on the Monarch's Way long-distance footpath. Also a cycle route passes through.

== History ==
Bradley comes from Old English and means the broad clearing or wood.

The manor of Bradley was given to Glastonbury Abbey in 746 by Ethelbald, King of Mercia, and held it until the dissolution of the monasteries in 1539.

The parish of West Bradley was part of the hundred of Glaston Twelve Hides, while Hornblotton was part of the Whitstone Hundred.

== Governance ==
The parish council has responsibility for local issues, including setting an annual precept (local rate) to cover the council's operating costs and producing annual accounts for public scrutiny. The parish council evaluates local planning applications and works with the local police, district council officers, and neighbourhood watch groups on matters of crime, security, and traffic. The parish council's role also includes initiating projects for the maintenance and repair of parish facilities, as well as consulting with the district council on the maintenance, repair, and improvement of highways, drainage, footpaths, public transport, and street cleaning. Conservation matters (including trees and listed buildings) and environmental issues are also the responsibility of the council.

For local government purposes, since 1 April 2023, the village comes under the unitary authority of Somerset Council. Prior to this, it was part of the non-metropolitan district of Mendip, which was formed on 1 April 1974 under the Local Government Act 1972, having previously been part of Shepton Mallet Rural District.

It is also part of the Frome and East Somerset county constituency represented in the House of Commons of the Parliament of the United Kingdom. It elects one Member of Parliament (MP) by the first past the post system of election.

== Landmarks ==
The Court Barn was built in the 15th century as a Tithe barn for Glastonbury Abbey, and was restored in the early 20th century.

Lottisham Manor dates from the 15th century. Bradley House is slightly later having been built in the 16th and 17th centuries. It was completed in 1726 by Col William Piers and included ornamental canals in the grounds.

Near the church in Hornblotton is Hornblotton House, a large country mansion with substantial outbuildings and a large pond.

== Religious sites ==
The Church of England Parish Church of St Andrew, West Bradley dates predominantly from the 14th and 15th centuries, but underwent extensive restoration in the 19th century.

The parish Church of St Mary in Lottisham was built in 1876 by Sir T. G. Jackson. It is a Grade II* listed building.

The Church of St Peter in Hornblotton was built in 1872–74 by Sir Thomas Graham Jackson, for the rector, Geoffrey Thring. It is a Grade I listed building, and features one of the first electric clocks produced.
