= Somerset Rural Life Museum =

Grade I listed museum in Somerset, UK

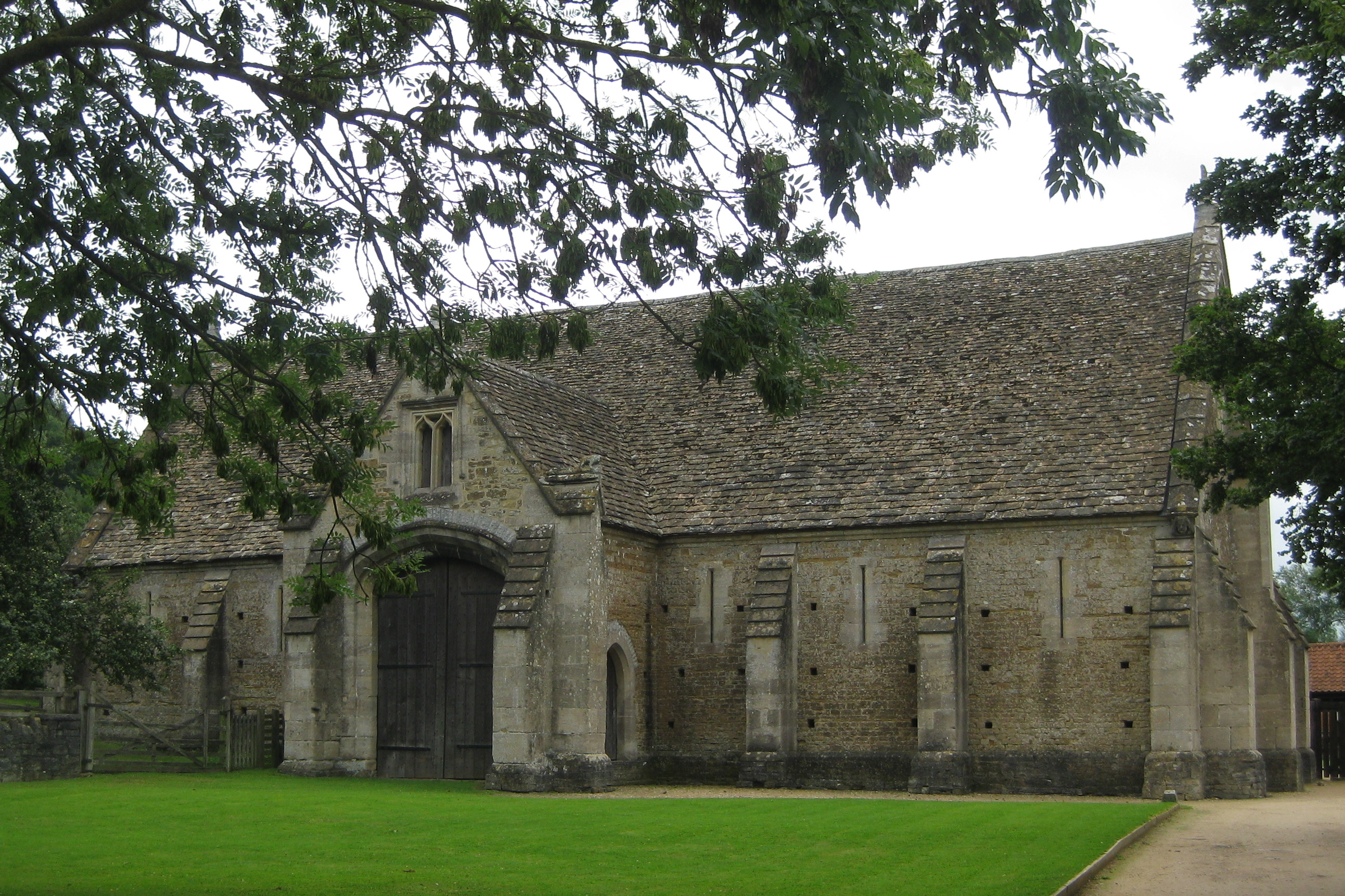

- Location within Somerset and the United Kingdom
- Established: 1975
- Location: Glastonbury, Somerset
- Coordinates: 51.1485°N 2.7140°W
- Website: Museum Website

Scheduled monument
- Official name: The Abbey Barn at Abbey Farm
- Designated: 12 January 1932
- Reference no.: 1019389

Listed Building – Grade I
- Official name: Abbey Tithe Barn including attached wall to the east
- Designated: 21 June 1950
- Reference no.: 1057953

The Somerset Rural Life Museum is situated in Glastonbury, Somerset, UK. It is a museum of the social and agricultural history of Somerset, housed in buildings surrounding a 14th-century barn once belonging to Glastonbury Abbey.

It was used for the storage of arable produce, particularly wheat and rye, from the abbey's home farm of approximately 524 acres (2.12 km^{2}). It is not believed to have stored produce offered as tithe payments and is therefore referred to as an abbey barn rather than a tithe barn. Threshing and winnowing would also have been carried out in the barn.

The barn which was built from local 'shelly' limestone, with thick timbers supporting the stone tiling of the roof. It has been designated by English Heritage as a Grade I listed building, and is a Scheduled monument. In 2011 the 14 feet (4.3 m) high doors of the barn were replaced by local craftsmen using materials and traditional techniques and materials to a design based on The Bishop's Eye in Wells.

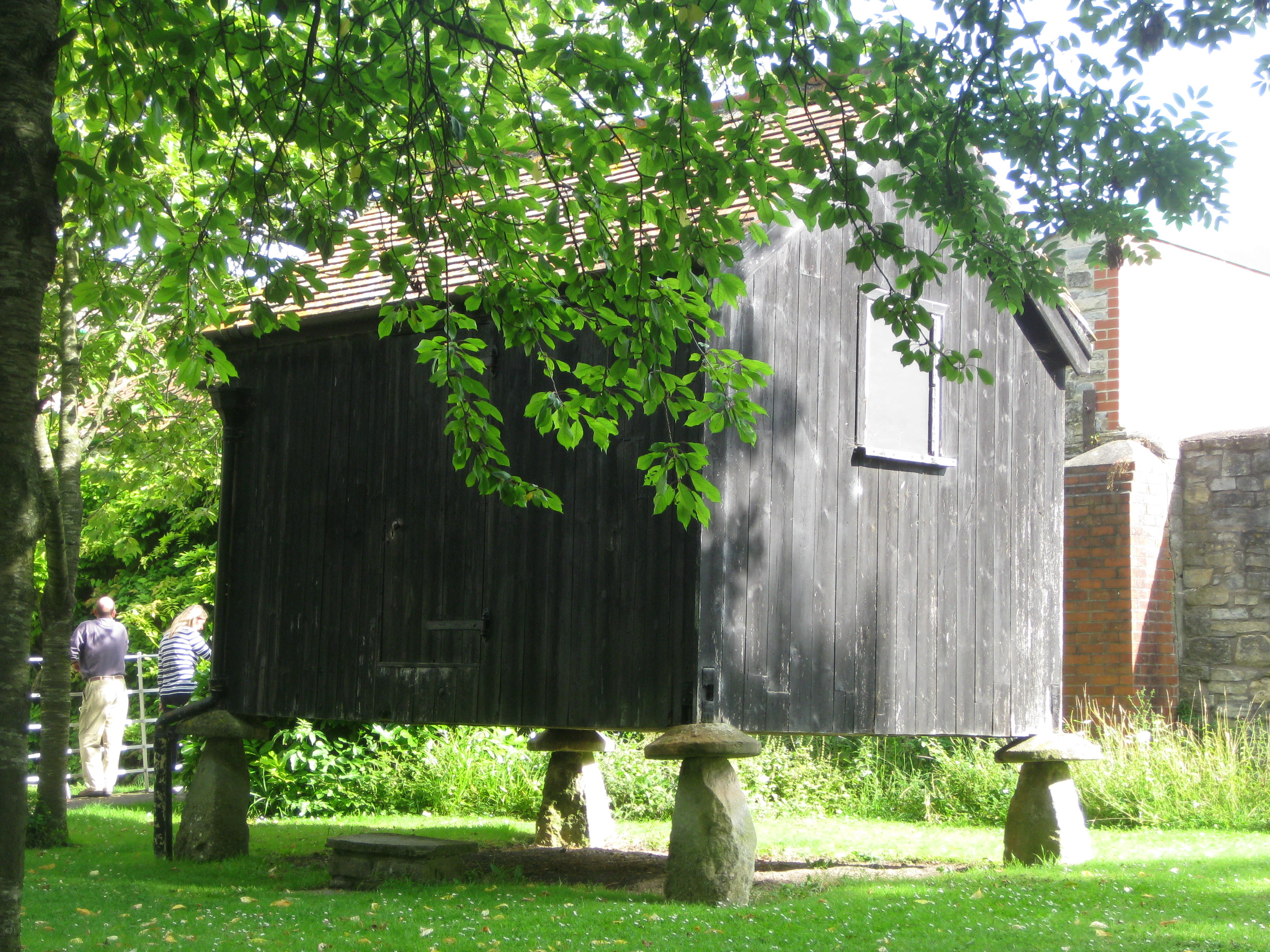
A granary sitting on staddle stones at the Somerset Rural Life Museum

After the Dissolution of the Monasteries in 1539 the barn was given to the Duke of Somerset. By the early 20th century it was being used as a farm store by the Mapstone family. In 1974 they donated it to Somerset County Council and between 1976 and 1978 underwent restoration. It was also used as the location for the pistol duel in Stanley Kubrick's "Barry Lyndon", released in 1975.

The barn and courtyard contain displays of farm machinery from the Victorian or early 20th Century period. Other exhibits show local crafts, including willow coppicing, mud horse fishing on the flats of Bridgwater Bay, peat digging on the Somerset Levels, and the production of milk, cheese, and cider. In reconstructed rooms detailing domestic life in the nearby village of Butleigh, the story of one farm worker, John Hodges, is told from cradle to grave.

Outside, there is a beehive and rare breeds of poultry and sheep, in the cider apple orchard. Regular craft demonstrations and talks on farming are held, as are activities for children and families. There is a shop, tea room, car park and disabled access. The shop is run by the Friends of the Somerset Rural Life Museum.

== Gallery of museum exhibits ==
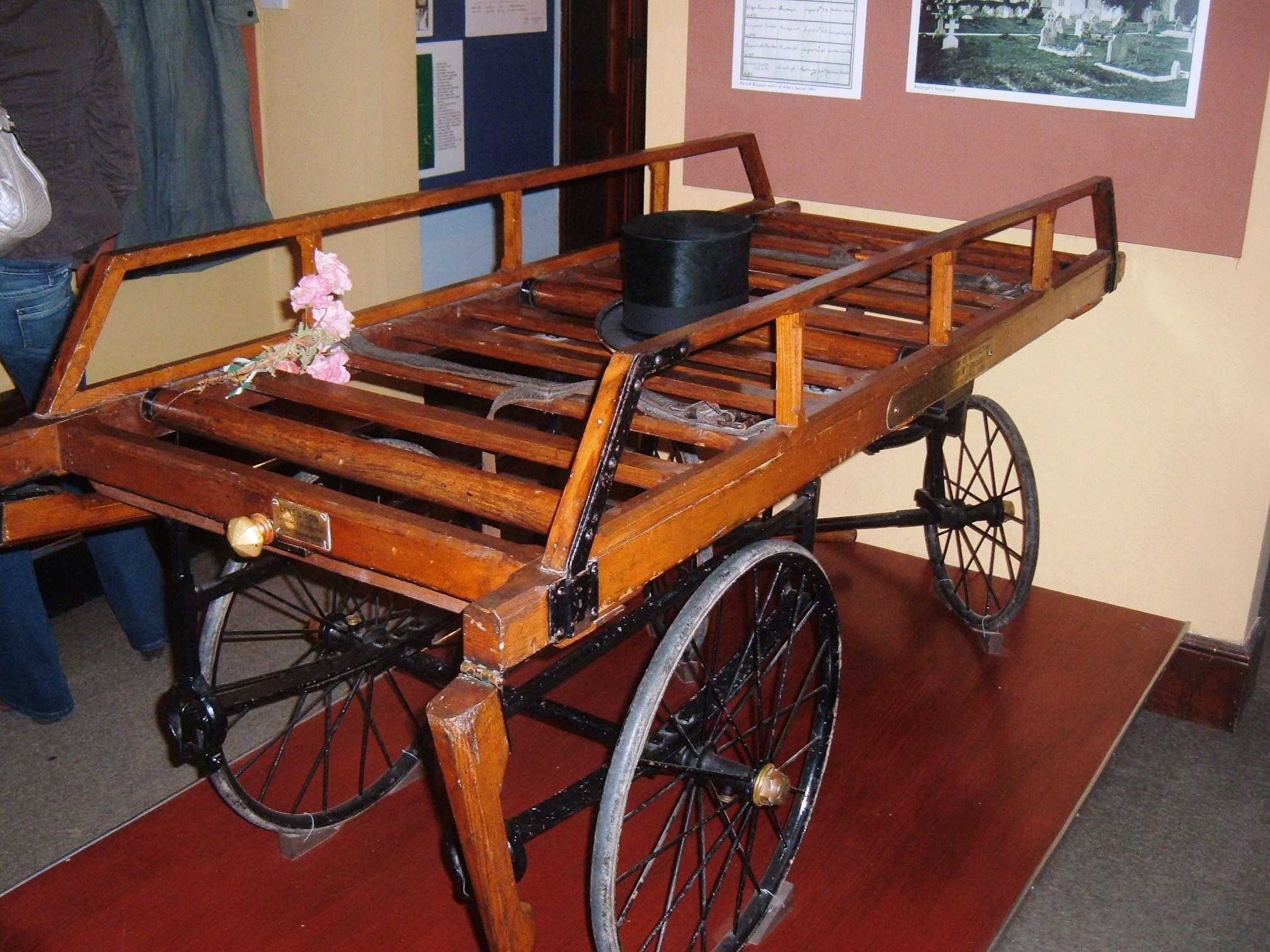
Funeral bier

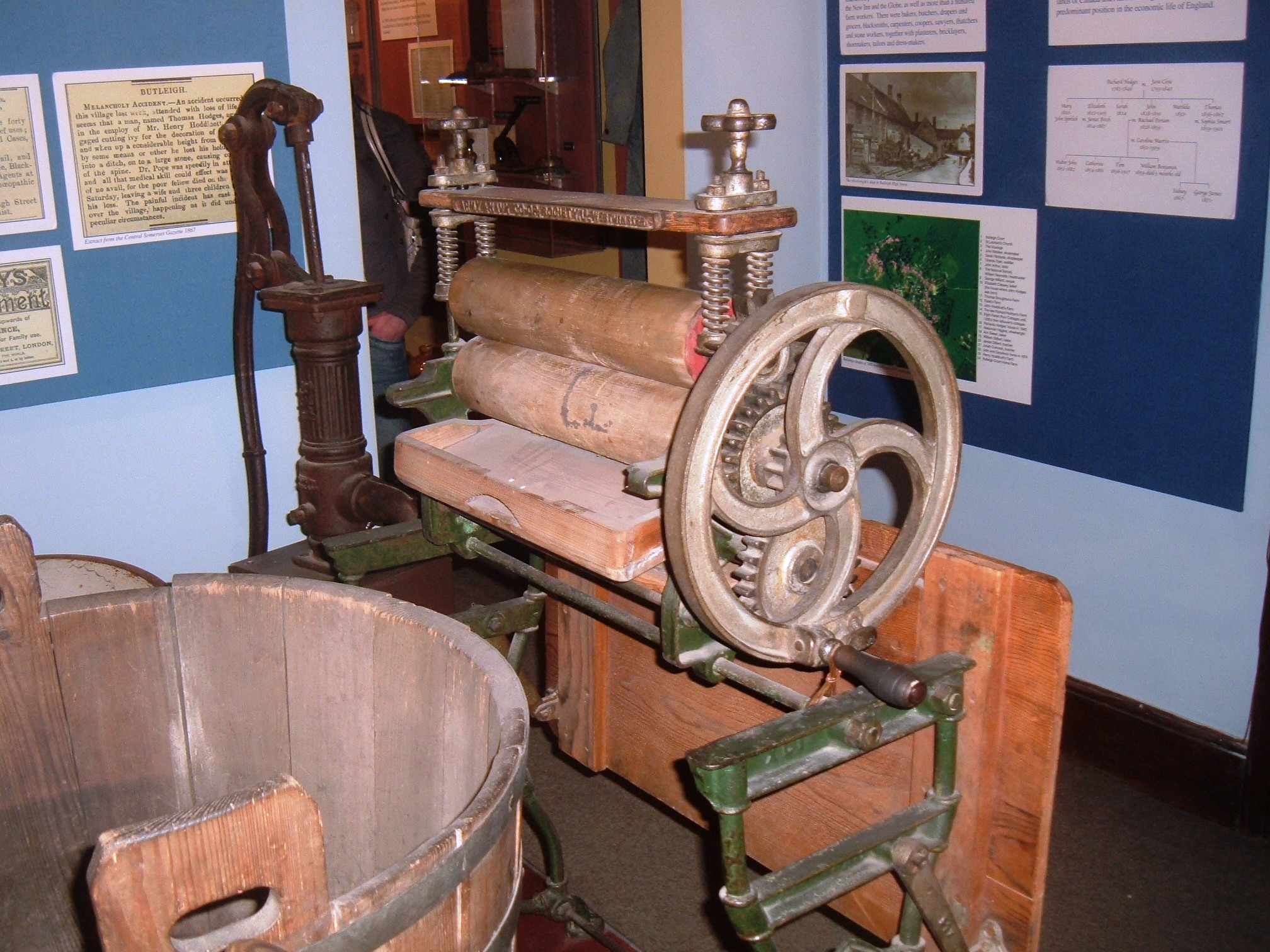
Mangle

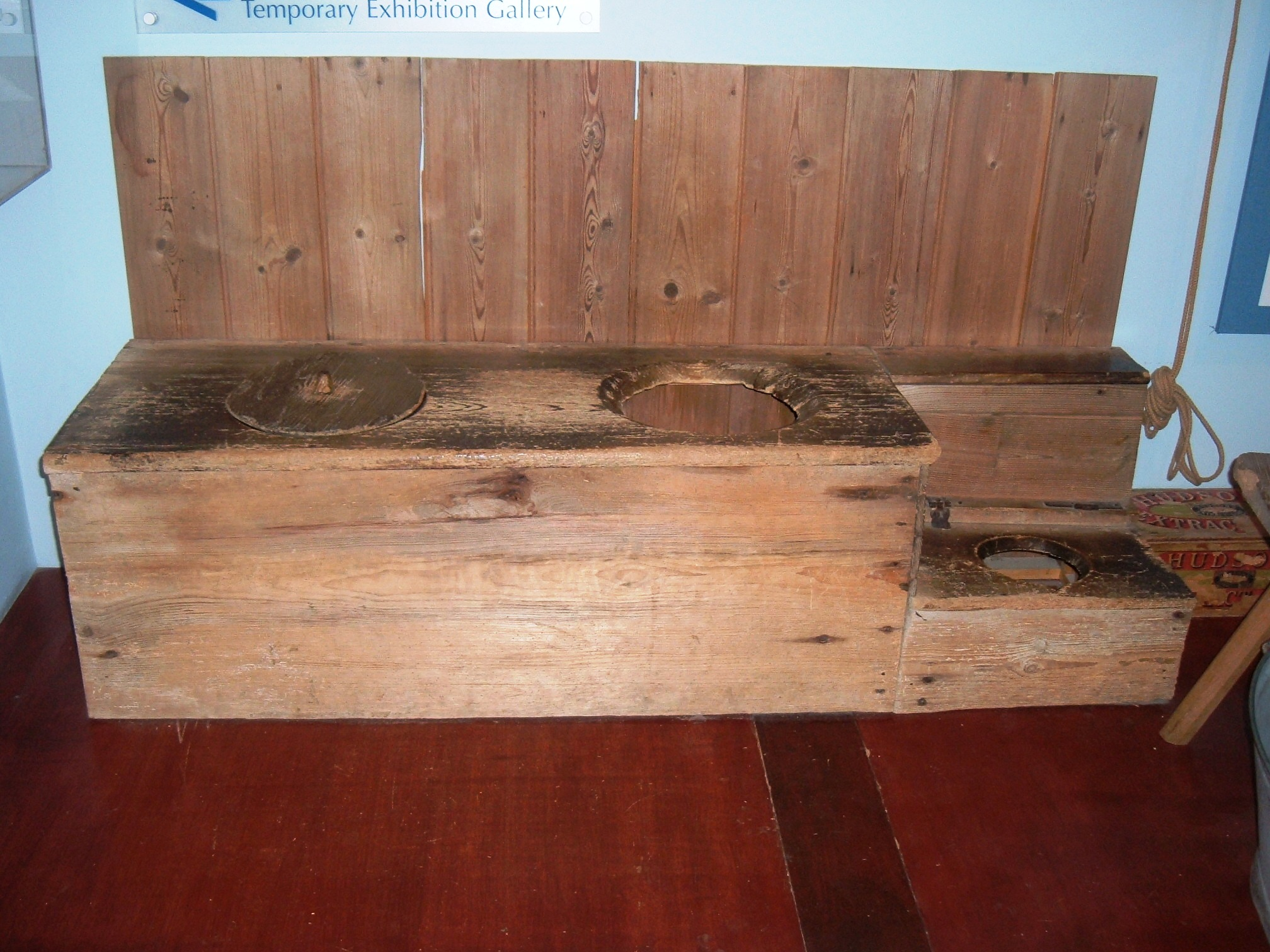
Three seater toilet

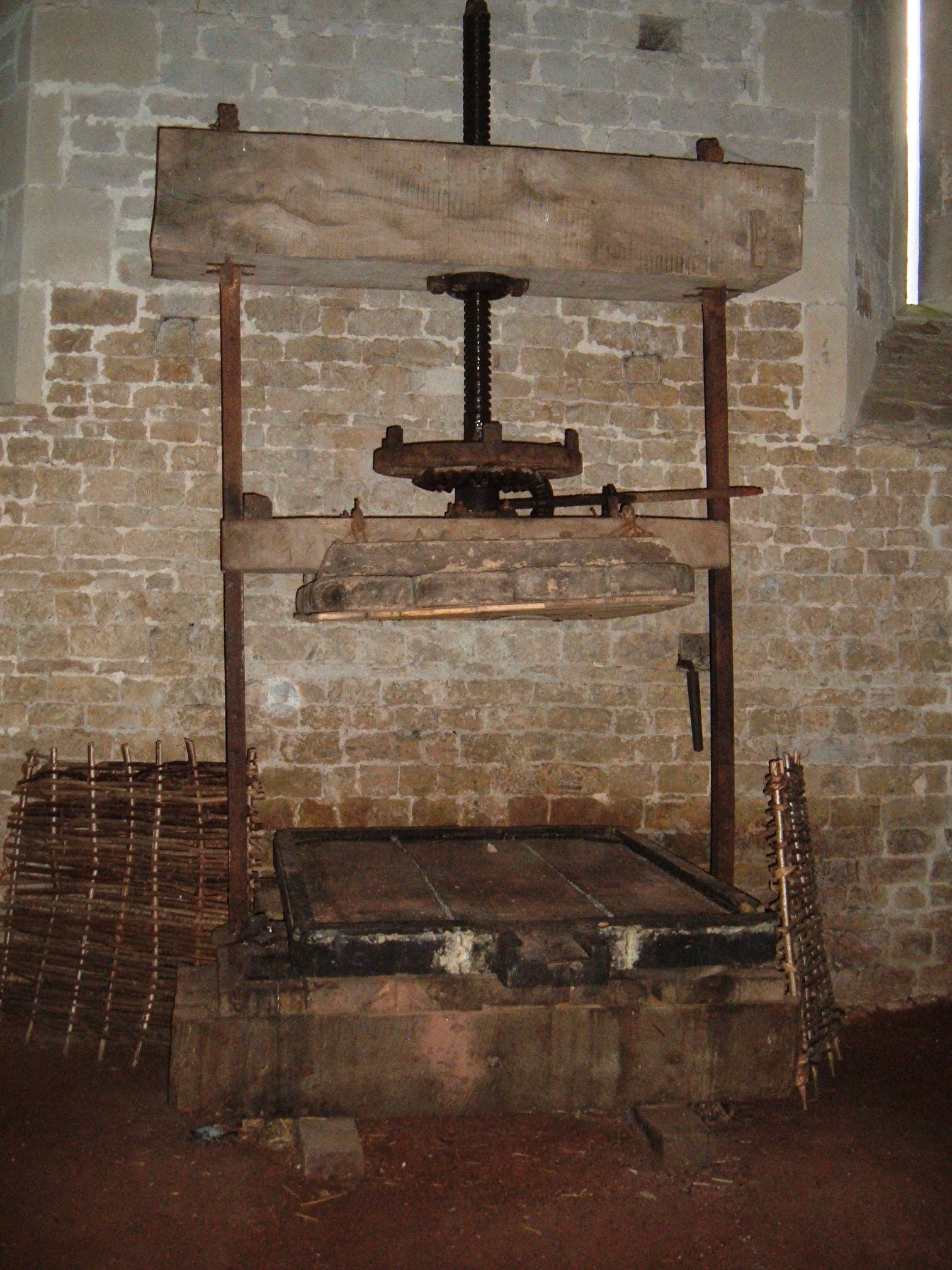
Apple Press for cider making

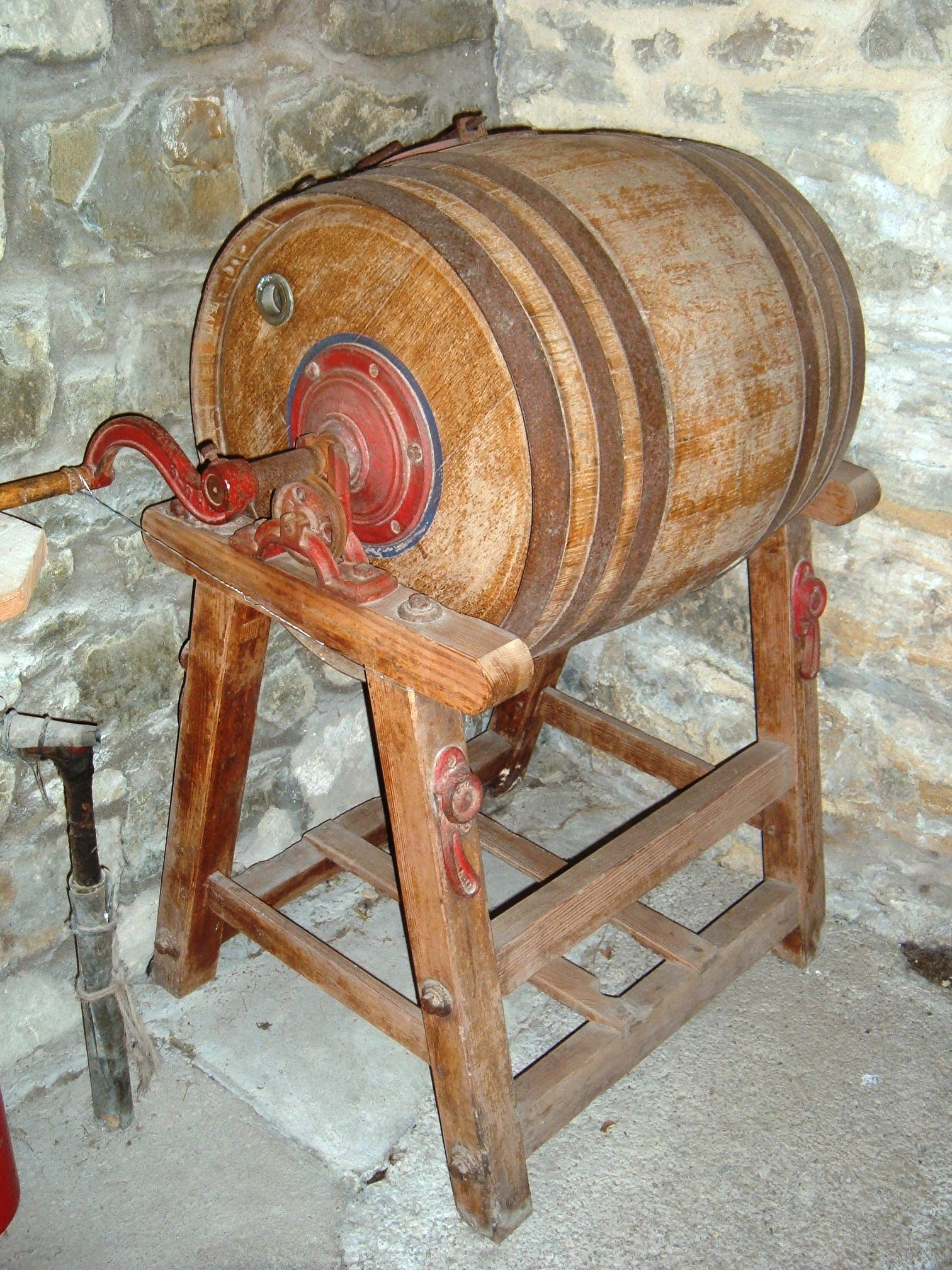
Butter Churn
