= Richard Beere =

English Benedictine abbot of Glastonbury (died 1524)

Richard Beere (or Bere) (born before 1493; died 20 January 1524) was an English Benedictine abbot of Glastonbury, known as a builder for his abbey, as a diplomat and scholar, and a friend of Erasmus.

== Life ==
He was installed as abbot in 1493, the election of Thomas Wasyn having been quashed by the Bishop of Bath and Wells.

In 1503, the king sent Beere, with two other ambassadors, to Rome to congratulate Pope Pius III on his elevation; but the pope died a few weeks after his election. In this year also he supplicated the congregation of the university of Oxford for a degree in divinity.

In 1508, he was engaged in a controversy with William Warham, archbishop of Canterbury, concerning the genuineness of the relics of St Dunstan at Glastonbury. Finding that the worshippers at the shrine of the saint picked off its ornaments, the abbot had caused it to be raised out of reach. The monks of Canterbury saw in this change in the position of the shrine an attempt to increase popular veneration. By order of the archbishop a search for the relics was made at Canterbury on 20 April, and Warham wrote to Abbot Beere telling him of the coffin and the bones which had been found, and bidding him attend on the feast of St. Thomas of Canterbury, and show cause why the Glastonbury monks should claim to have the genuine relics. Beere replied, upholding the claim of his convent, and asserting that if the Canterbury monks had such relics they belonged of right to Glastonbury. In this letter he describes the veneration displayed towards St. Dunstan by the Somerset folk. The archbishop replied in peremptory terms.

Abbot Beere died on 20 January 1524, and was buried under a plain slab of marble in the south aisle of the body of his church, near the chapel of the Holy Sepulchre which he built. A letter addressed to him ('R. Bero Glasconiensi Abbati') by Erasmus, 4 September 1524, shows that he was a scholar of eminence. Writing to him about his edition of St Jerome, Erasmus expresses his agreement in the abbot's opinion of his work. He speaks of his love of learning, and of the liberality he has shown to scholars, naming his own friend, Zacharias Frisius.

== Construction work ==
He was considered a great builder. On his return from Italy, the abbot built chapels of Our Lady of Loretto and of the Holy Sepulchre in his church. John Leland tells us that he built the greater part of King Edgar's chapel at the east end of his abbey church, that he arched on both sides the east end of the nave, and made the vault of the steeple in the transept and under it two arches. Beere also built a new set of chambers, in which he entertained Henry VII on his march into the west during the rebellion of Perkin Warbeck in the autumn of 1497; these rooms were called the king's lodgings. He also added new lodgings for secular priests to the various buildings of the abbey. Almshouses for ten old women were built at the north end of the abbey. A stone in the chapel exhibits his initials, surmounted by his cognisance, a cross between two beer-jugs. His initials and cognisance were also on St. Benedict's church in Glastonbury, and his initials, surmounted by a mitre, on the Lepers' Hospital at Monkton, near Taunton; both these buildings were repaired by him. Among his various works Beere built the manor-house at Sharpham, where Fielding was born.

== In fiction ==
He appears as a character in Monk and Knight (1891) by Frank W. Gunsaulus.
