= Grade II* listed buildings in Mendip =

Mendip district shown within Somerset

Mendip is a former local government district in the English county of Somerset. The Mendip district covers a largely rural area of 285 square miles (738 km^{2}) ranging from the Mendip Hills through on to the Somerset Levels. It had a population of approximately 110,000 in 2014. The administrative centre of the district was Shepton Mallet.

In the United Kingdom, the term listed building refers to a building or other structure officially designated as being of special architectural, historical or cultural significance; Grade II* structures are those considered to be "particularly significant buildings of more than local interest". Listing was begun by a provision in the Town and Country Planning Act 1947. Once listed, severe restrictions are imposed on the modifications allowed to a building's structure or its fittings. In England, the authority for listing under the Planning (Listed Buildings and Conservation Areas) Act 1990 rests with Historic England, a non-departmental public body sponsored by the Department for Digital, Culture, Media and Sport; local authorities have a responsibility to regulate and enforce the planning regulations.

There are 209 Grade II* listed buildings in Mendip. The list includes a large number of churches, some of which are Norman. Several buildings are associated with the church, particularly the Anglican Glastonbury Abbey and Wells Cathedral along with the Benedictine Downside Abbey. Many of the rest of the buildings are urban or rural houses ranging in date from the 12th to 19th centuries. Trade in the area is represented by market crosses and the Anglo-Bavarian Brewery. Shepton Mallet Prison and a village lock-up are also included in the list. The oldest is the Church of St Mary, Laverton, while the most recent is Mells War Memorial by Sir Edwin Lutyens.

== Buildings ==
Name	Location	Type	Completed (Note: The date given is the date used by Historic England as significant for the initial building or that of an important part in the structure's description.)	Grid ref. (Note: The grid reference is based on the British national grid reference system, sometimes known as OSGB36, used by the Ordnance Survey.) Geo-coordinates	Entry number (Note: The "List Entry Number" is a unique number assigned to each listed building and scheduled monument by Historic England.)	Image	Ref.
Abbey Gatehouse	Glastonbury	Porters lodge	Mid 14th century	ST4989738881; 51°08′49″N 2°43′04″W	1345446	Abbey Gatehouse More images	
Abbots Sharpham and Sharpham Park Farmhouse	Sharpham	Farmhouse	18th century	ST4669037428; 51°08′01″N 2°45′48″W	1345069	Abbots Sharpham and Sharpham Park Farmhouse More images	
Alice Street Farmhouse	Wanstrow	Farmhouse	Late 17th century	ST7243542795; 51°11′01″N 2°23′45″W	1345299	Upload Photo	
Almshouses and Chapel of St Mary Magdalene's Hospital	Glastonbury	Almshouse	c.1310	ST4988238661; 51°08′42″N 2°43′04″W	1057909	Almshouses and Chapel of St Mary Magdalene's Hospital More images	
Anglo Trading Estate	Shepton Mallet	Brewery	1864	ST6161443734; 51°11′30″N 2°33′02″W	1296561	Anglo Trading Estate More images	
Argyle House	Frome	House	1768–1769	ST7765247895; 51°13′47″N 2°19′17″W	1057828	Argyle House More images	
Babington House	Babington	Country house	17th century	ST7087350907; 51°15′24″N 2°25′08″W	1177567	Babington House More images	
Barclays Bank	Wells	House	c. 1453	ST5500645796; 51°12′35″N 2°38′44″W	1383011	Barclays Bank More images	
Barn 35 metres to North-East of Nunney Castle	Nunney	Barn	c. 1500	ST7369745782; 51°12′38″N 2°22′41″W	1058267	Barn 35 metres to North-East of Nunney Castle	
Bellerica Farmhouse	Witham Friary	Farmhouse	16th century	ST7215839183; 51°09′04″N 2°23′58″W	1175208	Upload Photo	
Berkley House	Berkley	Country house	Mid 18th century	ST8113149380; 51°14′36″N 2°16′18″W	1058192	Upload Photo	
Boathouse	Lullington	Boat house	Mid 18th century	ST7816151046; 51°15′29″N 2°18′52″W	1174399	Upload Photo	
Bowlish House	Shepton Mallet	House	1732	ST6125843959; 51°11′37″N 2°33′21″W	1058419	Bowlish House More images	
Bradley House	West Bradley	Country house	16th or 17th century	ST5582836925; 51°07′48″N 2°37′57″W	1058794	Bradley House More images	
Bridge Farmhouse	Butleigh	Farmhouse	14th century	ST5226033636; 51°06′00″N 2°40′59″W	1175640	Upload Photo	
Brookside Farm	Lullington	Farmhouse	Mid 18th century	ST7757753446; 51°16′47″N 2°19′22″W	1295843	Upload Photo	
Cathedral Green House	Wells	Row house	Pre 17th century	ST5503545822; 51°12′35″N 2°38′42″W	1382892	Cathedral Green House More images	
Charlton Viaduct	Shepton Mallet	Railway viaduct	1874	ST6279843548; 51°11′24″N 2°32′01″W	1058414	Charlton Viaduct More images	
Christ Church	Frome	Church	1817–1818	ST7733547865; 51°13′46″N 2°19′34″W	1057853	Christ Church More images	
Christ Church	Rode	Church	1824	ST8062954153; 51°17′10″N 2°16′45″W	1058062	Christ Church More images	
Church of All Saints	Downhead	Church	14th century	ST6917046189; 51°12′51″N 2°26′34″W	1174065	Church of All Saints More images	
Church of All Saints	Rodden, Selwood	Church	1640	ST7988147719; 51°13′42″N 2°17′22″W	1058893	Upload Photo	
Church of St Andrew	Holcombe	Church	Late Saxon or Early Norman	ST6688050734; 51°15′17″N 2°28′34″W	1058677	Church of St Andrew More images	
Church of St Andrew	West Bradley	Church	19th century	ST5578636874; 51°07′46″N 2°38′00″W	1058795	Church of St Andrew More images	
Church of St George	Whatley	Church	14th century	ST7340247603; 51°13′37″N 2°22′56″W	1058258	Church of St George More images	
Church of St Hugh	Charterhouse, Priddy	Church	1908	ST5013155663; 51°17′52″N 2°43′00″W	1307304	Church of St Hugh More images	
Church of St James	Milton Clevedon	Church	Rebuilt 1790	ST6645637788; 51°08′18″N 2°28′51″W	1059161	Church of St James More images	
Church of St James the Less	Foxcote, Hemington	Church	Early 18th century	ST7155555570; 51°17′55″N 2°24′34″W	1058709	Church of St James the Less More images	
Church of St John The Baptist	Chilcompton	Church	19th century	ST6469752410; 51°16′11″N 2°30′27″W	1345096	Church of St John The Baptist More images	
Church of St Katherine	East Woodlands, Selwood	Church	c. 1712	ST7898244151; 51°11′46″N 2°18′08″W	1175821	Church of St Katherine More images	
Church of St Lawrence	Westbury-sub-Mendip	Church	1887	ST4996048704; 51°14′07″N 2°43′05″W	1178326	Church of St Lawrence More images	
Church of St Leonard	Butleigh	Church	Mid 19th century	ST5200333922; 51°06′09″N 2°41′13″W	1058773	Church of St Leonard More images	
Church of St Leonard	Farleigh Hungerford	Church	1443	ST7999357423; 51°18′56″N 2°17′18″W	1174661	Church of St Leonard More images	
Church of St Mary	Berkley	Church	1751	ST8111249404; 51°14′37″N 2°16′19″W	1295976	Church of St Mary More images	
Church of St Mary	Chesterblade, Evercreech	Church	12th century	51°10′09″N 2°29′10″W	1222368	Church of St Mary More images	
Church of St Mary	Laverton, Lullington	Church	11th century	ST7781452997; 51°16′32″N 2°19′10″W	1366309	Church of St Mary More images	
Church of St Mary	Wanstrow	Church	15th century	ST7127541717; 51°10′26″N 2°24′44″W	1174955	Church of St Mary More images	
Church of St Mary	Cloford, Wanstrow	Church	15th century	ST7263443983; 51°11′40″N 2°23′35″W	1295509	Church of St Mary More images	
Church of St Mary	Lottisham, West Bradley	Church	1876	ST5703135060; 51°06′48″N 2°36′55″W	1058792	Church of St Mary More images	
Church of St Mary and St John	Lamyatt	Church	13th century	ST6612636190; 51°07′26″N 2°29′07″W	1344874	Church of St Mary and St John More images	
Church of St Mary Magdalene	Upton Noble	Church	12th century	ST7129339451; 51°09′13″N 2°24′43″W	1174889	Church of St Mary Magdalene More images	
Church of St Mary The Virgin	Ston Easton	Church	11th century	ST6238153453; 51°16′44″N 2°32′27″W	1295301	Church of St Mary The Virgin More images	
Church of St Michael	Dinder	Church	14th century	ST5751644601; 51°11′57″N 2°36′34″W	1345121	Church of St Michael More images	
Church of St Michael	Stoke St Michael	Church	c. 1400	ST6644446977; 51°13′16″N 2°28′55″W	1173964	Church of St Michael More images	
Church of St Peter	Lydford-on-Fosse	Church	1846	ST5646331882; 51°05′05″N 2°37′23″W	1175052	Church of St Peter More images	
Church of St Peter	North Wootton	Church	14th or 15th century	ST5637741808; 51°10′26″N 2°37′31″W	1175106	Church of St Peter More images	
Church of St Philip and St James	Norton St Philip	Church	14th century	ST7721755726; 51°18′01″N 2°19′41″W	1345373	Church of St Philip and St James More images	
Church of St Thomas	Wells	Church	1856–1857	ST5560346168; 51°12′47″N 2°38′13″W	1383153	Church of St Thomas More images	
Church of St Thomas A Beckett	Pylle	Church	1868	ST6070638334; 51°08′34″N 2°33′47″W	1175680	Church of St Thomas A Beckett More images	
Church of the Blessed Virgin Mary	Emborough	Church	18th century	ST6144051358; 51°15′36″N 2°33′14″W	1177590	Church of the Blessed Virgin Mary More images	
Church of the Holy Trinity	Binegar	Church	Norman	ST6153749454; 51°14′35″N 2°33′09″W	1058641	Church of the Holy Trinity More images	
Church of the Holy Trinity	Frome	Church	1837	ST7719648349; 51°14′02″N 2°19′41″W	1174175	Church of the Holy Trinity More images	
Churchyard Cross	East Pennard	Cross	15th century	ST5968637468; 51°08′06″N 2°34′39″W	1345215	Churchyard Cross	
Churchyard Cross in Churchyard, Church of St Aldhelm	Doulting	Cross	15th century	ST6461443153; 51°11′11″N 2°30′28″W	1345192	Churchyard Cross in Churchyard, Church of St Aldhelm More images	
Churchyard Cross in Churchyard, South of Church of St Bartholemew	Cranmore	Cross	14th century	ST6683043319; 51°11′17″N 2°28′34″W	1058529	Churchyard Cross in Churchyard, South of Church of St Bartholemew More images	
Claver Morris House	Wells	House	1699	ST5520946114; 51°12′45″N 2°38′33″W	1383173	Claver Morris House More images	
Congregational Chapel	Trudoxhill	Chapel	1699	ST7492143784; 51°11′34″N 2°21′37″W	1345311	Congregational Chapel	
Conservative Club	Wells	House	c. 1453	ST5501145798; 51°12′35″N 2°38′44″W	1383013	Conservative Club More images	
Court Farmhouse	Wookey	Farmhouse	18th century	ST5180445714; 51°12′31″N 2°41′29″W	1058584	Upload Photo	
Cranmore Hall, walling and gazebo, now part of All Hallows School	Cranmore	House	17th century	ST6815843744; 51°11′31″N 2°27′25″W	1058533	Upload Photo	
De Salis House and De Salis Cottage	Wells	House	Late 14th century	ST5521046150; 51°12′46″N 2°38′33″W	1383171	De Salis House and De Salis Cottage More images	
Ditcheat House or Ditcheat Manor	Ditcheat	House	Early 17th century	ST6257336370; 51°07′31″N 2°32′10″W	1275484	Ditcheat House or Ditcheat Manor More images	
Doulting Manor and stables (Previously listed as The Vicarage)	Doulting	House	Early 18th century	ST6457243158; 51°11′12″N 2°30′30″W	1221290	Upload Photo	
Dovecote	Norton St Philip	Dovecote	15th century	ST7713255925; 51°18′07″N 2°19′46″W	1174418	Dovecote	
Downside School	Stratton-on-the-Fosse	School	c. 1700	ST6553150716; 51°15′16″N 2°29′43″W	1295086	Downside School More images	
Dwelling at right angles to Rear of No 3; Wall and Gate Piers The Abbey The Grange	Beckington	House	c. 1620	ST8004451716; 51°15′51″N 2°17′15″W	1345319	Upload Photo	
Former Church of St Michael	Trudoxhill	Church	c. 1857	ST7799240227; 51°09′39″N 2°18′58″W	1058275	Former Church of St Michael More images	
Former St Michael's Roman Catholic Church	Shepton Mallet	Church	1804	ST6165343393; 51°11′18″N 2°33′00″W	1345271	Former St Michael's Roman Catholic Church	
Former Village Reading Room	Witham Friary	Dovecote	c. 1300	ST7445441081; 51°10′06″N 2°22′00″W	1175244	Upload Photo	
Fountain House	Frome	House	1818	ST7710948279; 51°14′00″N 2°19′45″W	1057829	Upload Photo	
Gazebo 20 m north of No 13 Bath Road	Beckington	Gazebo	18th century	ST8004651998; 51°16′00″N 2°17′15″W	1345296	Upload Photo	
Gazebo and attached stables, 10 m south west of No 1 (Rode Mill House)	Rode	Gazebo	Late 18th century	ST8026954294; 51°17′15″N 2°17′04″W	1175487	Upload Photo	
Glastonbury Abbey Precinct Wall from No.2 Silver Street to Abbey Gatehouse	Glastonbury	Precinct wall	15th century	ST4996338916; 51°08′50″N 2°43′00″W	1392856	Glastonbury Abbey Precinct Wall from No.2 Silver Street to Abbey Gatehouse More images	
Gloucester Lodge	Lullington	Lodge	Early 19th century	ST7862651854; 51°15′56″N 2°18′28″W	1295783	Gloucester Lodge More images	
Grey Gables	Pilton	House	15th century	ST5935740834; 51°09′55″N 2°34′58″W	1058805	Upload Photo	
Grottoes, 350 metres south west of rear of The Chantry	Whatley	Grotto	c. 1830	ST7193546603; 51°13′05″N 2°24′12″W	1345304	Upload Photo	
Group of 7 monuments in churchyard, adjacent to nave, Church of St Peter and St Paul	Kilmersdon	Gravestone	1680	ST6959952419; 51°16′12″N 2°26′14″W	1058693	Group of 7 monuments in churchyard, adjacent to nave, Church of St Peter and St Paul More images	
Hapsford House	Great Elm	House	Early 19th century	ST7594649692; 51°14′45″N 2°20′46″W	1174202	Hapsford House More images	
Hassage Manor	Norton St Philip	House	Mid 17th century	ST7522255733; 51°18′01″N 2°21′24″W	1115353	Upload Photo	
Her Majestys Prison and Perimeter Wall	Shepton Mallet	Boundary wall	1610	ST6212643639; 51°11′27″N 2°32′36″W	1058425	Her Majestys Prison and Perimeter Wall More images	
Higher Southtown Farmhouse	West Pennard	Farmhouse	16th century	ST5579337792; 51°08′16″N 2°38′00″W	1058800	Higher Southtown Farmhouse More images	
Ivythorn Manor	Street	Clerical dwelling	Medieval	ST4806534304; 51°06′20″N 2°44′35″W	1176171	Upload Photo	
Jacoby Cottage	Glastonbury	House	Medieval	ST5045539067; 51°08′55″N 2°42′35″W	1345431	Upload Photo	
Kilmersdon Lodges, gate piers and gates	Kilmersdon	Lodge	Early 19th century	ST7066152290; 51°16′08″N 2°25′19″W	1307411	Kilmersdon Lodges, gate piers and gates	
Kings Head Hotel	Wells	Inn	Late 18th century	ST5485945710; 51°12′32″N 2°38′51″W	1382974	Kings Head Hotel More images	
Langham House and attached stables	Rode	Country house	1792	ST8045254238; 51°17′13″N 2°16′54″W	1345390	Langham House and attached stables More images	
Lock-Up	Mells	Lock up	17th century	ST7261248983; 51°14′22″N 2°23′37″W	1058320	Lock-Up More images	
Lottisham Manor	West Bradley	House	Late 16th century	ST5748134331; 51°06′24″N 2°36′31″W	1308193	Lottisham Manor	
Lych Gate, flanking walls and gates on north side of Church of St Peter and St Paul	Kilmersdon	Church	1900	ST6958552445; 51°16′13″N 2°26′14″W	1058695	Lych Gate, flanking walls and gates on north side of Church of St Peter and St Paul More images	
Manor Cottages	Lullington	House	17th century	ST7783953166; 51°16′38″N 2°19′09″W	1366310	Manor Cottages	
Manor Farmhouse	Emborough	Farmhouse	Medieval	ST6139651328; 51°15′35″N 2°33′17″W	1345124	Manor Farmhouse	
Manor Farmhouse	Lullington	Farmhouse	17th century	ST7783753005; 51°16′33″N 2°19′09″W	1058171	Upload Photo	
Manor Farmhouse	Selwood	Farmhouse	Early 17th century	ST7769543947; 51°11′39″N 2°19′14″W	1176081	Upload Photo	
Manor Farmhouse	Wanstrow	House	1633	ST7104641695; 51°10′26″N 2°24′56″W	1174987	Upload Photo	
Manor Farmhouse	Coxbridge, West Pennard	Farmhouse	17th century	ST5417236553; 51°07′35″N 2°39′22″W	1345050	Manor Farmhouse More images	
Manor Farmhouse	Whatley	Farmhouse	c. 1700	ST7338647635; 51°13′38″N 2°22′57″W	1058259	Manor Farmhouse	
Manor Farmhouse Manor House	Wanstrow	House	17th century	ST7104641695; 51°10′26″N 2°24′56″W	1058285	Upload Photo	
Manor Farmhouse and attached dwelling	Stratton-on-the-Fosse	Farmhouse	Early 18th century	ST6663051718; 51°15′49″N 2°28′47″W	1178338	Upload Photo	
Manor Farmhouse and forecourt wall	Upper Milton, St Cuthbert Out	Farmhouse	19th century	ST5459547352; 51°13′25″N 2°39′06″W	1058604	Manor Farmhouse and forecourt wall	
Manor House	Pilton	House	17th century	ST5954342178; 51°10′39″N 2°34′48″W	1058822	Upload Photo	
Manor House	Stoke St Michael	Manor house	c. 1700	ST6641946917; 51°13′14″N 2°28′56″W	1345263	Upload Photo	
Manor House, gates and gate piers adjoining to west	Nunney	House	c. 1720	ST7360245743; 51°12′37″N 2°22′45″W	1174502	Upload Photo	
Market Cross	Nunney	Market cross	c. 1100	ST7374245763; 51°12′38″N 2°22′38″W	1058301	Market Cross More images	
Market Cross	Shepton Mallet	Market cross	c. 1500	ST6189043651; 51°11′27″N 2°32′48″W	1058383	Market Cross More images	
Marston House	Marston Bigot	House	c. 1650	ST7573045232; 51°12′21″N 2°20′56″W	1174802	Marston House More images	
Mellifont Abbey, boundary walls and gate piers	Wookey	Country house	1753–1765	ST5181845816; 51°12′34″N 2°41′28″W	1180119	Upload Photo	
Mells Village Hall	Mells	Village hall	14th century	ST7287449133; 51°14′27″N 2°23′24″W	1058313	Mells Village Hall More images	
Melrose House	Frome	House	c. 1700	ST7745048148; 51°13′55″N 2°19′28″W	1057747	Upload Photo	
Mendip House and boundary walls to road Welshmill House and boundary walls to road	Frome	House	c. 1790	ST7779348503; 51°14′07″N 2°19′10″W	1057740	Upload Photo	
Merfield House	Rode	House	c. 1810	ST7992353604; 51°16′52″N 2°17′21″W	1345393	Upload Photo	
Monastery of St Gregory the Great, Downside Abbey with Petre Cloister	Stratton-on-the-Fosse	Abbey	1873	ST6546850804; 51°15′19″N 2°29′46″W	1295178	Monastery of St Gregory the Great, Downside Abbey with Petre Cloister More images	
Monmouth Chambers	Frome	House	Late 17th century	ST7760948050; 51°13′52″N 2°19′19″W	1057818	Upload Photo	
Newbury House	Coleford	Country house	Early 18th century	ST6994050522; 51°15′11″N 2°25′56″W	1175636	Newbury House More images	
25 Keyford	Frome	House	18th century	ST7766147426; 51°13′32″N 2°19′17″W	1057796	Upload Photo	
4, Cheap Street	Frome	House	Late 16th century	ST7767848018; 51°13′51″N 2°19′16″W	1057840	4, Cheap Street	
11, Cheap Street	Frome	House	17th century	ST7770547980; 51°13′50″N 2°19′14″W	1057842	Upload Photo	
14–16, Willow Vale	Frome	House	c. 1720	ST7798348148; 51°13′56″N 2°19′00″W	1058465	Upload Photo	
21, Wine Street	Frome	House	c. 1730–1750	ST7739447945; 51°13′49″N 2°19′31″W	1058467	Upload Photo	
13, Bridge Street	Frome	House	Early–mid 18th century	ST7779148259; 51°13′59″N 2°19′10″W	1345465	Upload Photo	
16 and 17, Stony Street	Frome	House	c. 1688	ST7760248027; 51°13′52″N 2°19′20″W	1345534	Upload Photo	
6, New Street	Mells	House	c. 1470	ST7279549244; 51°14′30″N 2°23′28″W	1174360	6, New Street	
9, New Street	Mells	House	c. 1470	ST7278549206; 51°14′29″N 2°23′28″W	1174367	Upload Photo	
4, New Street	Mells	House	c. 1470	ST7277849254; 51°14′31″N 2°23′29″W	1295803	Upload Photo	
6 And 8, High Street	Rode	House	18th century	ST8029853779; 51°16′58″N 2°17′02″W	1058091	6 And 8, High Street	
8, Market Place	Shepton Mallet	House	Early to mid 17th century	ST6194343620; 51°11′26″N 2°32′45″W	1058457	8, Market Place More images	
6, High Street	Wells	House	16th century	ST5494845763; 51°12′33″N 2°38′47″W	1382951	6, High Street More images	
8, High Street	Wells	House	15th century	ST5494845753; 51°12′33″N 2°38′47″W	1382953	8, High Street More images	
3, Market Place	Wells	House	c. 1453	ST5499245781; 51°12′34″N 2°38′44″W	1383006	3, Market Place More images	
5, Market Place	Wells	House	c. 1453	ST5499745785; 51°12′34″N 2°38′44″W	1383008	5, Market Place More images	
7, Market Place	Wells	House	c. 1453	ST5499645798; 51°12′35″N 2°38′44″W	1383009	7, Market Place More images	
13, Market Place	Wells	House	c. 1453	ST5501845797; 51°12′35″N 2°38′43″W	1383015	13, Market Place More images	
15, Market Place	Wells	House	c. 1453	ST5502445800; 51°12′35″N 2°38′43″W	1383017	15, Market Place More images	
17, Market Place	Wells	House	c. 1453	ST5502745806; 51°12′35″N 2°38′43″W	1383019	17, Market Place More images	
19, Market Place	Wells	House	c. 1453	ST5503545805; 51°12′35″N 2°38′42″W	1383020	19, Market Place More images	
21, Market Place	Wells	House	c. 1453	ST5504145807; 51°12′35″N 2°38′42″W	1383021	21, Market Place More images	
23, Market Place	Wells	House	c. 1453	ST5504445817; 51°12′35″N 2°38′42″W	1383022	23, Market Place More images	
25, Market Place	Wells	House	c. 1453	ST5505145816; 51°12′35″N 2°38′41″W	1383023	25, Market Place More images	
7, Sadler Street	Wells	House	15th century	ST5495045778; 51°12′34″N 2°38′47″W	1383081	7, Sadler Street More images	
12, Sadler Street	Wells	House	c. 1800	ST5497545801; 51°12′35″N 2°38′45″W	1383086	12, Sadler Street More images	
3 And 5, St Thomas Street	Wells	House	14th century	ST5527946023; 51°12′42″N 2°38′30″W	1383128	3 And 5, St Thomas Street More images	
23, The Liberty	Wells	House	1819	ST5521846067; 51°12′43″N 2°38′33″W	1383176	23, The Liberty More images	
Norwood Park Farmhouse	Glastonbury	Abbots summer palace	1480	ST5255438982; 51°08′53″N 2°40′47″W	1296421	Upload Photo	
Old Bowlish House	Shepton Mallet	House	17th century	ST6124344015; 51°11′39″N 2°33′22″W	1172927	Old Bowlish House More images	
Old Farmhouse	West Pennard	Farmhouse	15th century	ST5405138959; 51°08′53″N 2°39′30″W	1175898	Upload Photo	
Old Pump House	Glastonbury	House	17th century	ST4989638679; 51°08′43″N 2°43′04″W	1296477	Old Pump House More images	
Orangery and walled garden at rear of Ammerdown House	Kilmersdon	Orangery	c. 1793	ST7115252768; 51°16′24″N 2°24′54″W	1345115	Upload Photo	
Orchardlea House, forecourt walls and gates	Lullington	House	1856	ST7771451286; 51°15′37″N 2°19′15″W	1058140	Orchardlea House, forecourt walls and gates More images	
Outbuilding, about 30 m west of Higher Southtown Farmhouse	West Pennard	House	Early 17th century	ST5576337803; 51°08′16″N 2°38′01″W	1175928	Outbuilding, about 30 m west of Higher Southtown Farmhouse	
Parish Church of St John the Baptist	Frome	Church	12th century	ST7770747909; 51°13′48″N 2°19′14″W	1345441	Parish Church of St John the Baptist More images	
Park House	Mells	House	18th century	ST7132248682; 51°14′12″N 2°24′44″W	1058296	Upload Photo	
Park House	Shepton Mallet	House	c. 1700	ST6121944090; 51°11′41″N 2°33′23″W	1172922	Upload Photo	
Polydor House	Wells	House	16th century	ST5501946045; 51°12′43″N 2°38′43″W	1383163	Polydor House More images	
Pylle Manor and attached walled garden at rear	Pylle	House	17th century	ST6076938264; 51°08′32″N 2°33′44″W	1058786	Pylle Manor and attached walled garden at rear	
Retaining walls and associated garden features on south and east sides of Ammerdown House	Kilmersdon	Boundary wall	17th century	ST7118252677; 51°16′21″N 2°24′52″W	1177422	Upload Photo	
Ritchie Hall	Wells	School	1884	ST5504646078; 51°12′44″N 2°38′42″W	1383166	Ritchie Hall	
Rockfield House and service buildings	Nunney	House	c. 1805	ST7339145550; 51°12′31″N 2°22′56″W	1058309	Upload Photo	
Rodden Manor	Selwood	House	Late 16th century	ST7961147573; 51°13′37″N 2°17′36″W	1058894	Upload Photo	
Rode Mill House	Rode	House	Late 18th century	ST8025654321; 51°17′16″N 2°17′04″W	1058061	Upload Photo	
Southfield House	Rode	House	17th century	ST8034153798; 51°16′59″N 2°17′00″W	1058092	Upload Photo	
St Algars Farmhouse	Selwood	Farmhouse	14th century	ST7876841945; 51°10′35″N 2°18′18″W	1058902	St Algars Farmhouse More images	
St Cuthbert's Lodge and attached walls and gate piers	Wells	House	Early 18th century	ST5467245787; 51°12′34″N 2°39′01″W	1382940	St Cuthbert's Lodge and attached walls and gate piers More images	
Stables to Ston Easton Park	Ston Easton	Stable	c. 1769	ST6243354087; 51°17′05″N 2°32′24″W	1295250	Upload Photo	
Stables, about 40 metres west of Standerwick Court	Beckington	Stable	18th century	ST8156351106; 51°15′32″N 2°15′56″W	1173876	Upload Photo	
Standerwick Court	Beckington	House	18th century	ST8163451123; 51°15′32″N 2°15′52″W	1173869	Upload Photo	
The Abbey Retreat House	Glastonbury	House	1830	ST5024238861; 51°08′49″N 2°42′46″W	1167617	The Abbey Retreat House More images	
The Ancient Gate House Hotel	Wells	Hotel	1451	ST5494945843; 51°12′36″N 2°38′47″W	1383093	The Ancient Gate House Hotel More images	
The Castle	Beckington	House	Early 17th century	ST7999451502; 51°15′44″N 2°17′17″W	1296202	The Castle More images	
The Cedars	Wells	House	c. 1758	ST5514546123; 51°12′45″N 2°38′37″W	1383170	The Cedars More images	
The Cedars and garden wall	Beckington	House	17th century	ST8005651951; 51°15′59″N 2°17′14″W	1173480	Upload Photo	
The Chantry	Whatley	House	c. 1826	ST7199246965; 51°13′16″N 2°24′09″W	1058254	Upload Photo	
The Chantry The Hermitage	Frome	House	Late 17th century	ST7764947852; 51°13′46″N 2°19′17″W	1345487	Upload Photo	
The Court House	Frome	House	c. 1700	ST7775948017; 51°13′51″N 2°19′12″W	1173467	Upload Photo	
The Crown Hotel	Wells	Hotel	Late 16th century	ST5501045752; 51°12′33″N 2°38′44″W	1383007	The Crown Hotel More images	
The Dean's Lodging	Wells	House	1610	ST5522446042; 51°12′43″N 2°38′33″W	1383178	The Dean's Lodging More images	
The Falconry, Lodge Farm	Norton St Philip	Farmhouse	14th or 15th century	ST7967558020; 51°19′15″N 2°17′35″W	1345341	Upload Photo	
The Iron Gates	Frome	House	c. 1696	ST7774248010; 51°13′51″N 2°19′13″W	1345516	The Iron Gates More images	
The Jolliffe Arms and Nos 235 and 236	Kilmersdon	House	Early 18th century	ST6957252404; 51°16′12″N 2°26′15″W	1058660	The Jolliffe Arms and Nos 235 and 236 More images	
The Jolliffe Column and terraced base	Kilmersdon	Column	1853	ST7181152170; 51°16′05″N 2°24′20″W	1058687	Upload Photo	
The Manor House	Croscombe	House	15th century	ST5892744312; 51°11′48″N 2°35′21″W	1058823	The Manor House More images	
The Manor House	Upton Noble	House	c. 1600	ST7164239392; 51°09′11″N 2°24′25″W	1345277	Upload Photo	
The Manor House and attached wall to rear	Pilton	Abbots summer palace	1235–1252	ST5880340755; 51°09′52″N 2°35′26″W	1175218	Upload Photo	
The Manor House, forecourt wall with piers and steps	Kilmersdon	House	1674	ST6943252260; 51°16′07″N 2°26′22″W	1345103	Upload Photo	
The Market Cross	Wells	Market cross	c. 1797	ST5499445763; 51°12′33″N 2°38′44″W	1383027	The Market Cross More images	
The Music School and attached walls	Wells	House	13th century	ST5511045946; 51°12′39″N 2°38′38″W	1382905	The Music School and attached walls More images	
The Old Almshouse	Wells	Almshouse	1436	ST5460945703; 51°12′31″N 2°39′04″W	1382942	The Old Almshouse More images	
The Old Chapel	Croscombe	House	Late 14th century	ST5906144462; 51°11′52″N 2°35′14″W	1174728	Upload Photo	
The Old Manse	Beckington	House	17th century	ST8008051919; 51°15′58″N 2°17′13″W	1345333	Upload Photo	
The Old Parsonage	Walton, Somerset	Clerical dwelling	15th century	ST4611236288; 51°07′24″N 2°46′17″W	1058723	Upload Photo	
The Old Vicarage	Frome	Vicarage	1744	ST7780847871; 51°13′47″N 2°19′09″W	1345519	Upload Photo	
The Priest House and adjoining range, Farleigh Hungerford Castle	Farleigh Hungerford	Farmhouse	17th century	ST8014357629; 51°19′03″N 2°17′11″W	1058118	The Priest House and adjoining range, Farleigh Hungerford Castle More images	
The Priory (also known as The Abbey)	Ditcheat	House	1473	ST6235436143; 51°07′24″N 2°32′21″W	1275470	The Priory (also known as The Abbey) More images	
The Rib	Wells	House	Mid 15th century	ST5522645940; 51°12′39″N 2°38′32″W	1383106	The Rib More images	
The Talbot Inn	Mells	Inn	c. 1470	ST7275549207; 51°14′29″N 2°23′30″W	1058314	The Talbot Inn More images	
Thomas Jolliffe Monument in churchyard, about 50 metres south east of Church of St Peter and St Paul	Kilmersdon	Gravestone	1918	ST6964652412; 51°16′12″N 2°26′11″W	1177784	Thomas Jolliffe Monument in churchyard, about 50 metres south east of Church of St Peter and St Paul	
Tower House	Wells	House	Early 14th century	ST5518845983; 51°12′41″N 2°38′34″W	1383103	Tower House More images	
Town Hall, including wall with steps to street	Glastonbury	Wall	1818	ST4991538873; 51°08′49″N 2°43′03″W	1057904	Town Hall, including wall with steps to street More images	
Unidentified Monument in churchyard about 4 metres south of south chapel Church of St Leonard	Rodney Stoke	Chest tomb	15th century	ST4823449840; 51°14′43″N 2°44′35″W	1058593	Upload Photo	
Village Cross adjacent to entrance of and in churchyard, Church of St Mary	Meare	Cross	15th century	ST4553141662; 51°10′18″N 2°46′50″W	1058751	Upload Photo	
Village Cross adjacent to The Bull Terrier	Croscombe	Cross	14th century	ST5904044346; 51°11′49″N 2°35′15″W	1058863	Village Cross adjacent to The Bull Terrier More images	
Village Cross to west of Church of St Peter	Evercreech	Cross	15th century	ST6490038683; 51°08′47″N 2°30′11″W	1059174	Village Cross to west of Church of St Peter More images	
Wall around grounds of Glastonbury Abbey and Abbey Retreat House, including the gate way on Chilkwell Street	Glastonbury	Boundary wall	19th century	ST5033238759; 51°08′45″N 2°42′41″W	1345438	Wall around grounds of Glastonbury Abbey and Abbey Retreat House, including the gate way on Chilkwell Street More images	
Walling enclosing garden of Doulting Manor including gateway with piers, and gazebo	Doulting	Boundary wall	19th century	ST6451143095; 51°11′10″N 2°30′33″W	1058519	Upload Photo	
War Memorial	Mells	War memorial	c. 1920	ST7291649151; 51°14′27″N 2°23′22″W	1058315	War Memorial More images	
West Compton House, forecourt wall and piers on roadside	West Compton, Pilton	Farmhouse	17th century	ST5939742245; 51°10′41″N 2°34′56″W	1345021	Upload Photo	
West Lodge	Frome	House	1778–1780	ST7725747954; 51°13′49″N 2°19′38″W	1296444	Upload Photo	
Westholme House	Pilton	House	Mid to late 18th century	ST5776141425; 51°10′14″N 2°36′20″W	1345043	Upload Photo	
Whitchurch Farmhouse	Ston Easton	Farmhouse	c. 1140	ST6344053553; 51°16′48″N 2°31′32″W	1345104	Whitchurch Farmhouse	
Wick Farmhouse	Norton St Philip	Farmhouse	17th century	ST7873857214; 51°18′49″N 2°18′23″W	1058113	Wick Farmhouse	
Wiltshires Barton	Frome	House	Early 18th century	ST7725848247; 51°13′59″N 2°19′38″W	1295877	Upload Photo	

== See also ==
- Grade II* listed buildings in Somerset
- Grade I listed buildings in Mendip
