= Church of St Andrew, West Bradley =

Church in Somerset, England

The Parish Church of West Bradley
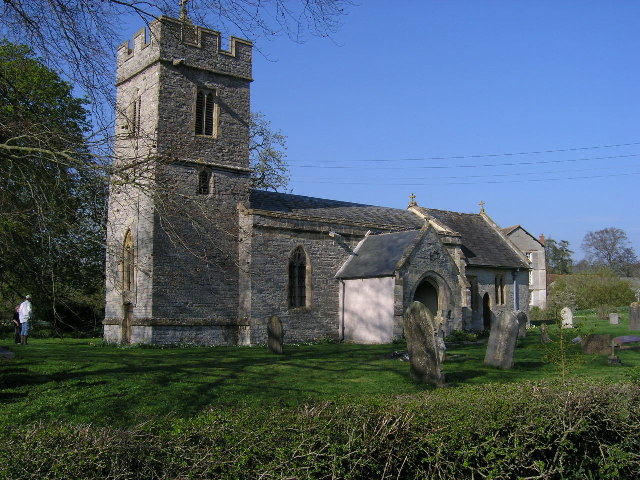

- Location within Somerset
- 51°07′46″N 2°38′00″W
- Location: West Bradley, Somerset, England

History
- Built: 14th century

Listed Building – Grade II*
- Designated: 2 June 1961
- Reference no.: 1058795

The Anglican Parish Church of West Bradley within the English county of Somerset, dates from the 14th century. It is a Grade II* listed building.

The first chapel on the site appears in records dating from 1168. Until 1875 it was a subsidiary chapel to the Church of All Saints at East Pennard. The dedication to St Andrew was only added in the 20th century.

It consists of a two-bay nave, a south porch and a chancel, which has an organ loft. The two-stage square west tower has a small stair-turret on the northern side. The tower holds a ring of bells, the oldest of which dates from 1706, and has a clock which was added in 1739. The chancel and some other parts of the church underwent extensive restoration in the 19th century. Inside the church are a Norman font and a piscina. Further work, including the underpinning of the chancel arch, was undertaken in 1898.

The parish is part of the benefice of Baltonsborough with Butleigh, West Bradley and West Pennard within the Diocese of Bath and Wells.

== See also ==
- List of ecclesiastical parishes in the Diocese of Bath and Wells
