= Glastonbury Town Hall =

Municipal building in Glastonbury, Somerset, England

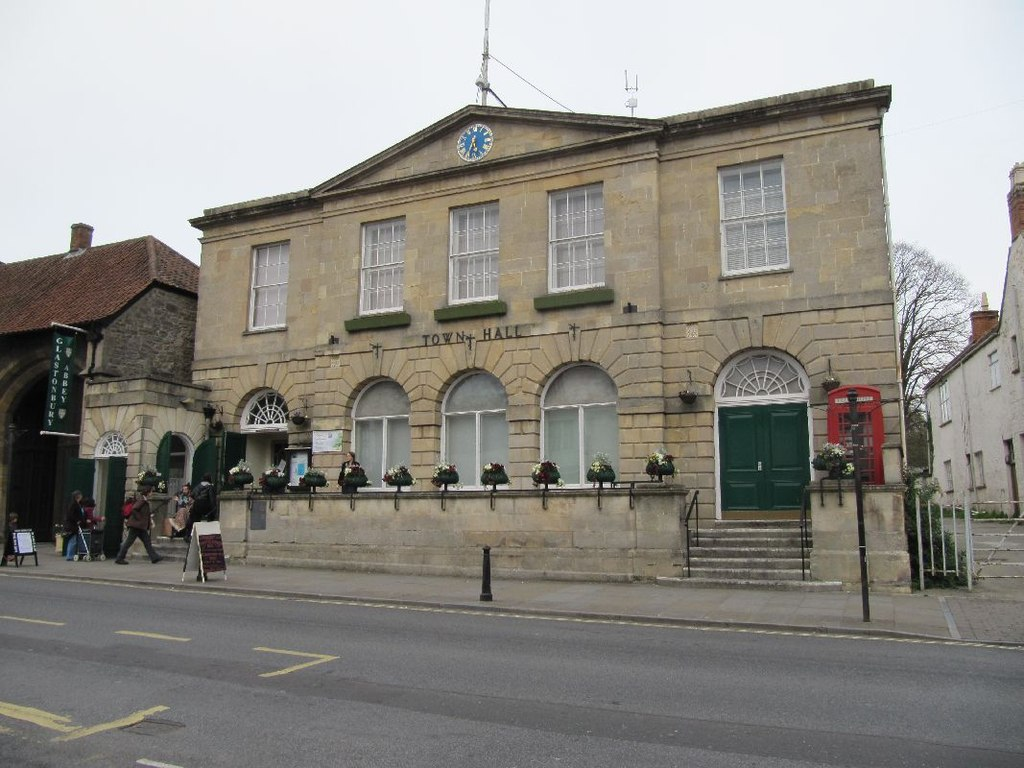
- Glastonbury Town Hall

- Shown in Somerset
- 51.1469°N 2.7175°W
- Location: Magdalene Street, Glastonbury

History
- Built: 1814

Site notes
- Architect: Joseph Beard
- Architectural style: Neoclassical style

Listed Building – Grade II*
- Official name: Town Hall, including wall with steps to street
- Designated: 21 June 1950
- Reference no.: 1057904

Glastonbury Town Hall is a municipal building in Magdalene Street, Glastonbury, Somerset, England. The structure, which is the meeting place of Glastonbury Town Council, is a Grade II* listed building.

== History ==
The first municipal building in the town was a market hall on the west side of the Market Place, which was commissioned by William Strode IV (1675–1746) who owned a share in the local manor, in around 1715. The borough leaders leased the upper part of the building as a venue for their meetings in 1794. By the early 19th century the market hall was in a dilapidated condition and had to be demolished; the borough leaders decided to build a new structure on the east side of the Market Place.

The new building was designed by Joseph Beard in the neoclassical style, built in ashlar stone and was opened in time for a council meeting in December 1814. The design involved a symmetrical main frontage with five bays facing onto Magdalene Street; the building was arcaded on the ground floor, so that markets could be held, with a main hall on the first floor. There was a row of sash windows on the first floor and the central section of three bays, which slightly projected forward, was pedimented with a clock in the tympanum. The ground floor was subsequently infilled with three round headed casement windows in the central section and with doors with fanlights in the outer bays. Internally, the principal room was the main hall on the first floor which became the council chamber for the borough council and was illuminated by chandeliers.

A small geological museum, primarily exhibiting ichthyosaur fossils, was established on the first floor in 1880 but, after outgrowing the premises, it moved to larger premises at Crispin Hall in Street in 1887. Similarly, the building also accommodated a cinema from 1912 until it relocated to more substantial premises in 1930. During the Second World War, the town hall was the meeting place for the invasion committee formed to combat any threat of a German invasion through Lyme Bay. In August 1987 the New Age thinker, Sir George Trevelyan, hosted a ceremony in the town hall to "heal the earth".

Although the town hall continued to be used as the meeting place of the borough council for much of the 20th century, council officers and their departments were located in offices in the High Street. Following local government reorganisation in 1974, when Glastonbury was absorbed into the enlarged Mendip District, the council chamber became the meeting place of the local parish level body, Glastonbury Town Council.

Works of art in the town hall include a portrait by Godfrey Kneller of the former Lord Chancellor, Lord King.

== See also ==
- Grade II* listed buildings in Mendip
