= Cloford Quarry =

Geological Site of Special Scientific Interest in Somerset, England

- Site of Special Scientific Interest
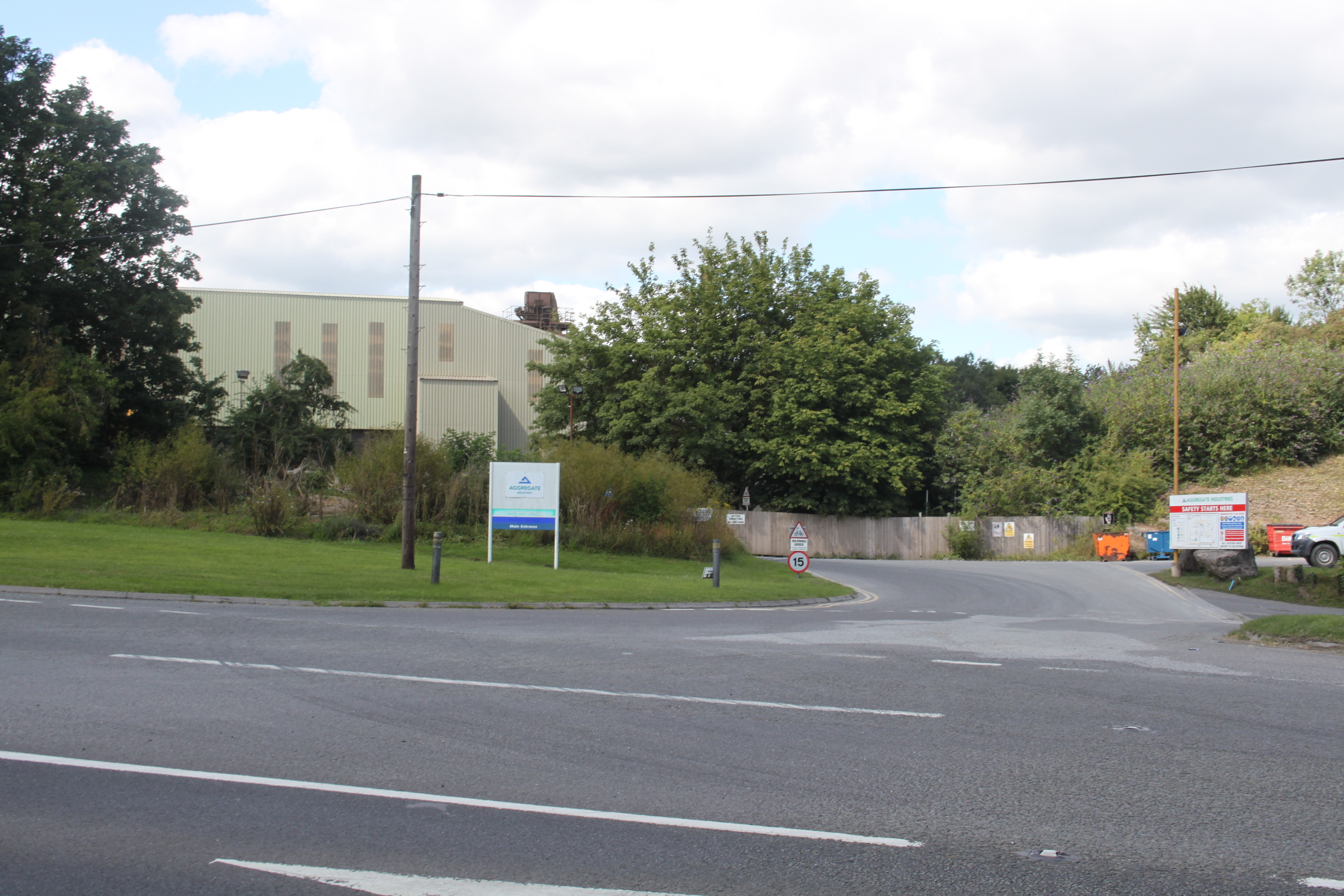

- Location within Somerset
- Location of Cloford Quarry.
- Area of search: Somerset
- Grid reference: ST718444
- Coordinates: 51.19811°N 2.40497°W
- Interest: Geological
- Area: 39.92 ha (98.6 acres)
- Notification date: 1994

Cloford Quarry (grid reference ST718444) is a 39.92-hectare (98.6-acre) geological Site of Special Scientific Interest to the south of the A361 approximately 350 metres (1,150 ft) north of the hamlet of Cloford and 1 kilometre (0.6 mi) west of Nunney on the Mendip Hills in Somerset. It was notified in 1994.

It is a Geological Conservation Review site important for the exposures of sediments of Triassic and Jurassic age which occur in major fissures within the Carboniferous Limestone laid down beneath the sea some 350 million years ago. Fissures, created by the uplift, folding and faulting of the Carboniferous Limestone, periodically opened and closed which were filled with deposits of Rhaetic, Hettangian, Sinemurian, Pliensbachian, Toarcian and Bathonian ages. The surface also contains large number of borings made into it by bivalved molluscs living in the Jurassic seas. No other site in Britain shows such a variety and abundance of sediment-infilled fissures of this age.

In 2006 planning permission was granted for continued extraction of limestone until 2042.

Cloford Quarry was the main location used for the planet Lakertya in the Doctor Who story Time and the Rani. Shots filmed here include the exterior of the Rani's laboratory.

== See also ==
- Quarries of the Mendip Hills
