= Leighton Road Cutting =

- Site of Special Scientific Interest
- Location within Somerset
- Location of Leighton Road Cutting.
- Area of search: Somerset
- Grid reference: ST702437
- Coordinates: 51.19174°N 2.42781°W
- Interest: Geological
- Area: 0.6 hectares (0.0060 km^{2}; 0.0023 sq mi)
- Notification date: 1984

Leighton Road Cutting (grid reference ST702437) is a 0.6 hectare geological Site of Special Scientific Interest between East Cranmore and Cloford in Somerset, notified in 1984. It is a Geological Conservation Review site

Leighton Road Cutting provides exposure of a series of early Jurassic limestones, of Lower Lias age, which are the only known outcrops of these particular rocks to occur in a normal horizontally-bedded sequence in the Mendips. The discovery of the Leighton Road Cutting sections enabled geologists to understand how the fissure infills seen widely throughout the Mendips had been formed.

== Sources ==
- English Nature citation sheet for the site (accessed 10 August 2006)
