= Thomas Crump =

English cricketer

Personal information
- Born: 12 March 1845; Cleobury Mortimer, Shropshire, England
- Died: 18 January 1907 (aged 61); East Pennard, Somerset, England
- Batting: Right-handed

Domestic team information
- Years: Team
- 1885: Somerset

Career statistics
Competition	First-class
Matches	1
Runs scored	8
Batting average	8
100s/50s	0/0
Top score	8
Catches/stumpings	0/0
- Source: ESPNcricinfo, 16 July 2019

Thomas Crump (12 March 1845 – 18 January 1907) was an English clergyman and amateur cricketer. After graduating from Oxford University, Crump held various ecclesiastical roles in the Herefordshire and Shropshire areas before moving to Somerset in 1880. He remained in Somerset until his death in 1907.

He was a keen cricketer, and played county cricket for both Herefordshire and Shropshire, before making his solitary first-class cricket appearance for Somerset in 1885, aged 40: he scored eight runs in his only innings.

== Life and ecclesiastical career ==
Thomas Crump was born on 12 March 1845, in Cleobury Mortimer, Shropshire. (Note: According to his ESPNcricinfo profile, Crump was born on 5 July 1845 in Bristol, and died on 8 January 1907. The lifedates and birthplace detail is also supported by cricket statistician Tony Percival.) His father, also Thomas Crump, was described by the cricket historian Stephen Hill as "a man of means who described his occupation as 'gentleman'". The younger Thomas Crump attended Lucton School, an independent school near Leominster in Herefordshire, and then went up to Wadham College, Oxford. He graduated from Wadham in 1868, and became curate in Bitterley, Shropshire. Three years later, he was made vicar of Leintwardine, Herefordshire, where he remained for five years. In 1876, he married Josephine Helen Colvin, the daughter of Colonel John Colvin of Leintwardine House, and became vicar of the nearby Downton-on-the-Rock.

He remained in the Leintwardine area for another four years, before he was appointed as rector of Corfe, near Taunton, Somerset. One of the senior members of the Church of England in the Taunton area, A. C. Ainslie, was a cousin of Josephine, and often visited the family at Leintwardine House. Hill suggests that the appointment of Crump to Corfe was an example of the "nepotism ... in the Church of England". Crump served as rector of Corfe until 1897, when he became vicar of East Pennard, near Shepton Mallet, Somerset. He had two sons and three daughters, and remained vicar of East Pennard until his death on 18 January 1907 from a long illness.

== Sporting career ==
Before his move to Somerset, Crump had played county cricket for both Herefordshire and Shropshire (the latter in one match in 1871), though neither played first-class cricket, and club cricket for Ludlow. He continued to play cricket after his move, and was praised in the Taunton local press for scoring 120 runs for Fullands against Taunton in 1882.

In 1885, at the age of 40, Crump made his only first-class cricket appearance, playing for Somerset County Cricket Club against Hampshire, scoring eight runs in the only innings in which he batted. Somerset's cricket during the 1885 season was so poor that they were stripped of their first-class status, and did not regain it until 1891. Crump remained involved with the county club, appearing for the "Somerset Club and Ground" team whose fixtures were designed to supplement the club's income, and often involved some members of the county's first team. Later, Crump became a member of Somerset's committee. As well as cricket, he became a keen golfer, and was a member of the Burnham and Berrow Golf Club.

== Bibliography ==
- Foot, David (1986). Sunshine, Sixes and Cider: The History of Somerset Cricket. Newton Abbot, Devon: David & Charles. ISBN 0-7153-8890-8.
- Hill, Stephen (2016). Somerset Cricketers 1882 – 1914. Wellington, Somerset: Halsgrove. ISBN 978-0-85704-291-0.
- Percival, Tony (1999). Shropshire Cricketers 1844–1998. Nottingham: Association of Cricket Statisticians and Historians. ISBN 1-902171-17-9.
