= Charles Daubeny (priest) =

English churchman and controversialist (1745–1827)

Charles Daubeny (baptised 16 August 1745 – 10 July 1827) was an English churchman and controversialist, who became archdeacon of Salisbury.

== Life ==
The second son of George Daubeny, a Bristol merchant, he was baptised 16 August 1745, educated at a private school at Philip's Norton, and sent when 15 years old to Winchester College. Shortly after his admission he fell ill, was incapacitated for more than a year, and never entirely recovered. He became head boy of the school, and at age 18 gained an exhibition at New College, Oxford, where he later became a Fellow.

Coming of age, his father having died, he inherited a fortune, but the state of his health constrained him. In 1770, he went abroad to the German mineral springs. In 1771, he visited St. Petersburg, where, by the influence of the Princess Dashkow, whose acquaintance he had made in Paris, he was introduced at court, and made some study of Greek Catholicism.

On his return to England in 1772, he resided for some months at Oxford to prepare for holy orders, a necessary qualification to his admission to a fellowship at Winchester College. He was ordained deacon in 1773 by the Bishop of Oxford, and priest in the following week by Richard Terrick, bishop of London, and in the same year graduated B.C.L. He obtained his fellowship in 1774, but only held it for two years, when the college living of North Bradley, Wiltshire, was offered him. This living was poor and the parish neglected. He now married a Miss Barnston, and until his vicarage could be made habitable lived at Clifton. He set about restoring his church, and supplemented the Sunday morning service by others in the evening and during the week. He also rebuilt the vicarage, raised the income of the living, and started a Sunday school. He was at first unpopular with his parishioners, both on account of his orthodoxy (most of the inhabitants being dissenters), and because he had pulled down cottages to enlarge the vicarage grounds.

In 1784, he was appointed to the prebend of Minor Pars Altaris in Salisbury Cathedral, and four years later published his first work, 'Lectures on the Church Catechism.' For the two following years Daubeny resided abroad, and was at Versailles on the outbreak of the French Revolution. In 1790, his health was weak and he wintered in Bath, Somerset and while there interested himself in promoting the erection of a free church. His first sermon in aid of this object produced over £1,200. Christ Church, Bath was opened in 1798, and was the first free and open church in the country; Daubeny became the first minister.

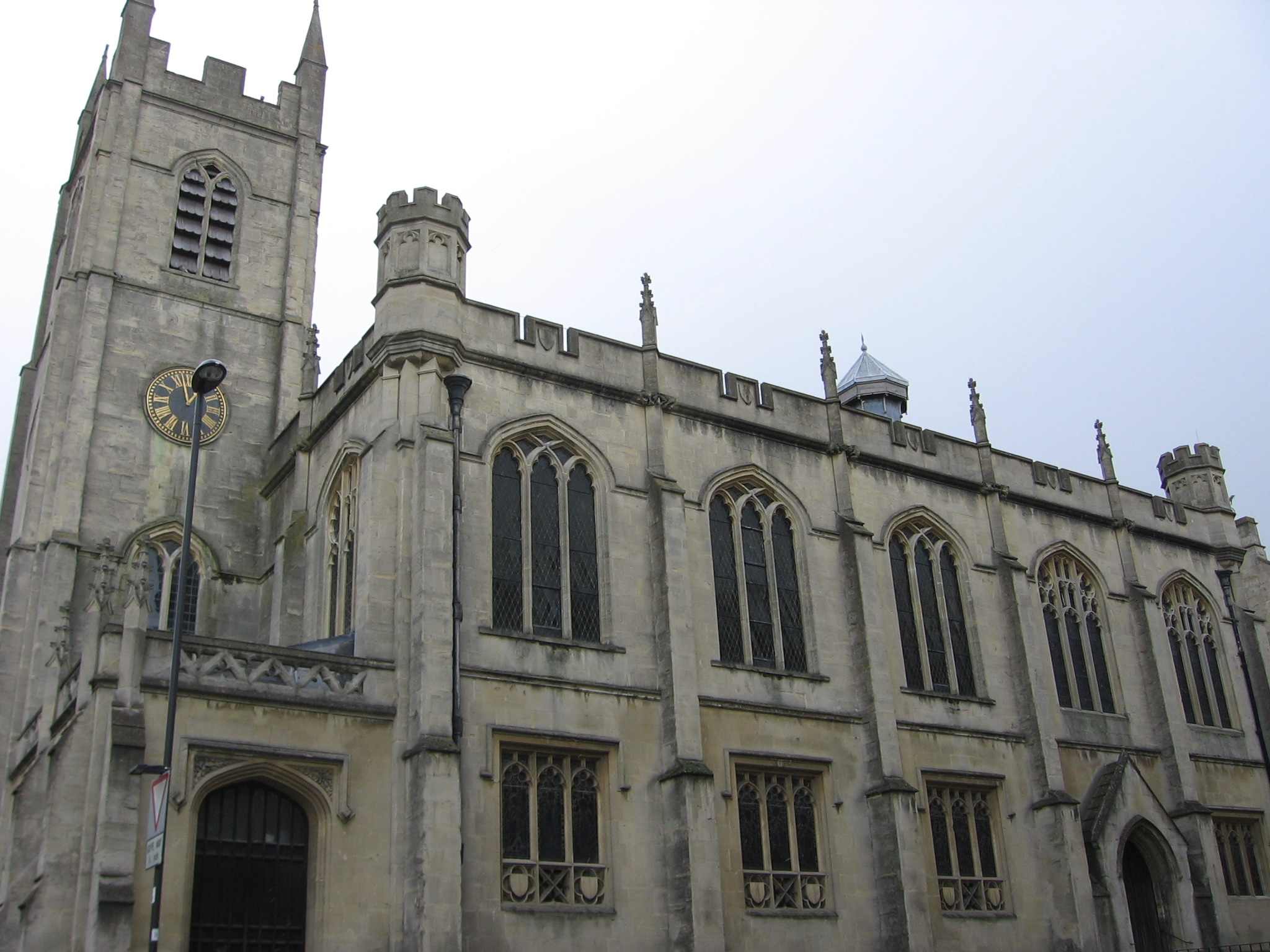
Christ Church, Bath

In 1804, he was appointed archdeacon of Salisbury. In 1801, he had been thanked and invited to court for a sermon preached before the king and queen at Weymouth. Daubeny declined the invitation, as his retired habits rendered him unfit for a court chaplain. George III, however, urged his claims for a bishopric upon various ministers. In 1808, he founded and endowed an almshouse for four poor inhabitants of North Bradley, and also built a school at the same place at his own expense. In a charge delivered in 1812 he gave reasons for supporting the Society for Promoting Christian Knowledge in preference to the Bible Society, which gave rise to a controversy between the supporters of the different societies, but in which he did not take a very active part.

From 1805 to 1816, he was chiefly engaged in literary work and his parochial duties; in the latter year, he had a paralytic stroke. In 1817, he superintended the erection of a poor-house he built for the use of his parishioners. In 1821, he published seventeen sermons, by Bishop Lancelot Andrewes, which he had modernised with the view of making them more popular. The University of Oxford in 1822, in recognition of his services to the church, conferred upon him the degree of D.C.L. During the following year his parishioners expressed a wish that a church should be erected at Road to serve a distant part of the parish, and Daubeny set about collecting subscriptions for the purpose. He got a fever, and his life was for some time despaired of. Shortly after his recovery, he lost his wife. During this year the church at Road, Christ Church, Rode, was consecrated, Daubeny preaching the sermon; its cost, with the endowment and parsonage, was upwards of £13,000, of which he contributed nearly £4,000.

On 8 July 1827, he officiated both at Bradley and Road, and on 9 July, he was taken suddenly ill and died 10 July 1827, aged 81 or 82. By his will, he left several thousand pounds towards parochial objects.

== Works ==
Daubeny was rigidly orthodox; in his theories of the dignity and importance of the Church of England and her ministers he anticipated the Tractarians. He was a strong advocate for education, though he wrote against the system introduced by Joseph Lancaster. He was a voluminous author.

His principal work are:

- 'Lectures on the Church Catechism,' 1788.
- 'A Guide to the Church, in several discourses,' 2 vols. 1798–9. He prepared a series of lectures, delivered to his parishioners at Bradley, embodying a scheme for the union of different parties in the Christian church; and in 1799 he followed it with an appendix which constituted a second volume. This work, which endeavours to prove that the discipline of the church of England is of apostolic origin, and that, therefore, any departure therefrom is schismatical, became popular; it was, however, attacked by nonconformists.
- 'The Fall of Papal Rome,' &c. 1798.
- 'Letters to Mrs. Hannah More, on her Strictures on Female Education,' 1799.
- 'Eight Discourses on the Connexion between the Old and New Testament,' 1802.
- 'Vindiciæ Ecclesiæ Anglicanæ,' 1803.
- 'The Trial of the Spirits; a Warning against Spiritual Delusion,' 1804.
- 'Reasons for Supporting the Society for Promoting Christian Knowledge in preference to the new Bible Society,' 1812.
- 'A Word to the Wise,' 1812.
- 'A few Plain Thoughts on the Liturgy,' 1814.
- 'Remarks on the Unitarian Mode of Explaining the Scriptures,' 1815.
- 'On the Doctrine of Regeneration,' 1816.
- 'Thirteen Discourses,' 1816.
- 'On Schism,' 1819.
- 'Seventeen Sermons of Bishop Andrewes Modernised,' 1821.
- 'The Protestant's Companion,' 1824.
- 'Supplement to the Protestant's Companion,' 1825.

He also published his charges to the clergy in the archdeaconry of Salisbury in 1805, 1806, 1807, 1809, 1810, 1812, 1813, 1815, 1819, 1821, 1824, 1825, and 1827.
