= Wanstrow railway station =

Former railway station in England

Coordinates: 51.1702°N 2.4156°W

Wanstrow railway station was a small station on the East Somerset Railway serving the village of Wanstrow in Somerset.

The East Somerset Railway opened between its junction with the Wilts, Somerset and Weymouth Railway at Witham and Shepton Mallet in 1858, but the railway company did not build a station at Wanstrow. The cost of a building a station was estimated at between £600 and £800, and annual costs of £100. With other stations at Bruton four miles away, and Witham only two miles distant, it was considered there would be very little traffic. Local people paid for a small building, and a platform was built later. The station opened on 1 January 1860.

The East Somerset Railway was extended to Wells in 1862 and then, in 1878, linked through Wells to the Bristol and Exeter Railway's Cheddar Valley line. With both the railway companies involved coming under the ownership of the Great Western Railway, through services began between Witham and Yatton.

Wanstrow station was one of the smallest stations on this line, and for many years the platform was only long enough for two railway coaches. It was unstaffed until 1909 and the buildings were wooden. It closed to passenger traffic with the rest of the line on 9 September 1963 and was then demolished, although the line through the site is still used for goods traffic from local quarries and for transport to and from the preserved East Somerset line.
