= Church of St Katherine, East Woodlands =

Church in East Woodlands, Somerset, UK

Church of St Katherine
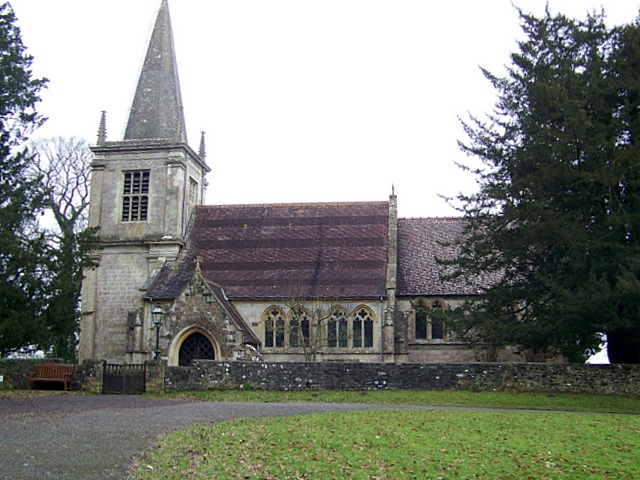

- Location within Somerset
- 51.1962°N 2.3022°W
- Location: East Woodlands, Selwood, Somerset, England

History
- Built: c. 1712

Listed Building – Grade II*
- Official name: Church of St Katherine
- Designated: 11 March 1968
- Reference no.: 1175821

The Anglican Church of St Katherine in East Woodlands, Selwood, Somerset, England was built around 1712. It is a Grade II* listed building.

== History ==
The tower was built around 1712 but the rest of the building was replaced in 1880 to designs by John Loughborough Pearson in the English Gothic style.

The construction of the church was funded by the Longleat estate.

The parish and benefice is within the Diocese of Bath and Wells.

== Architecture ==
The stone church consists of a two-bay nave and chancel, with north and south aisles, and a south porch. The tower has pilaster surmounted by pinnacles.

Inside the church is a 15th-century font.
