= Christ Church, Frome =

Church in Somerset, England

Christ Church
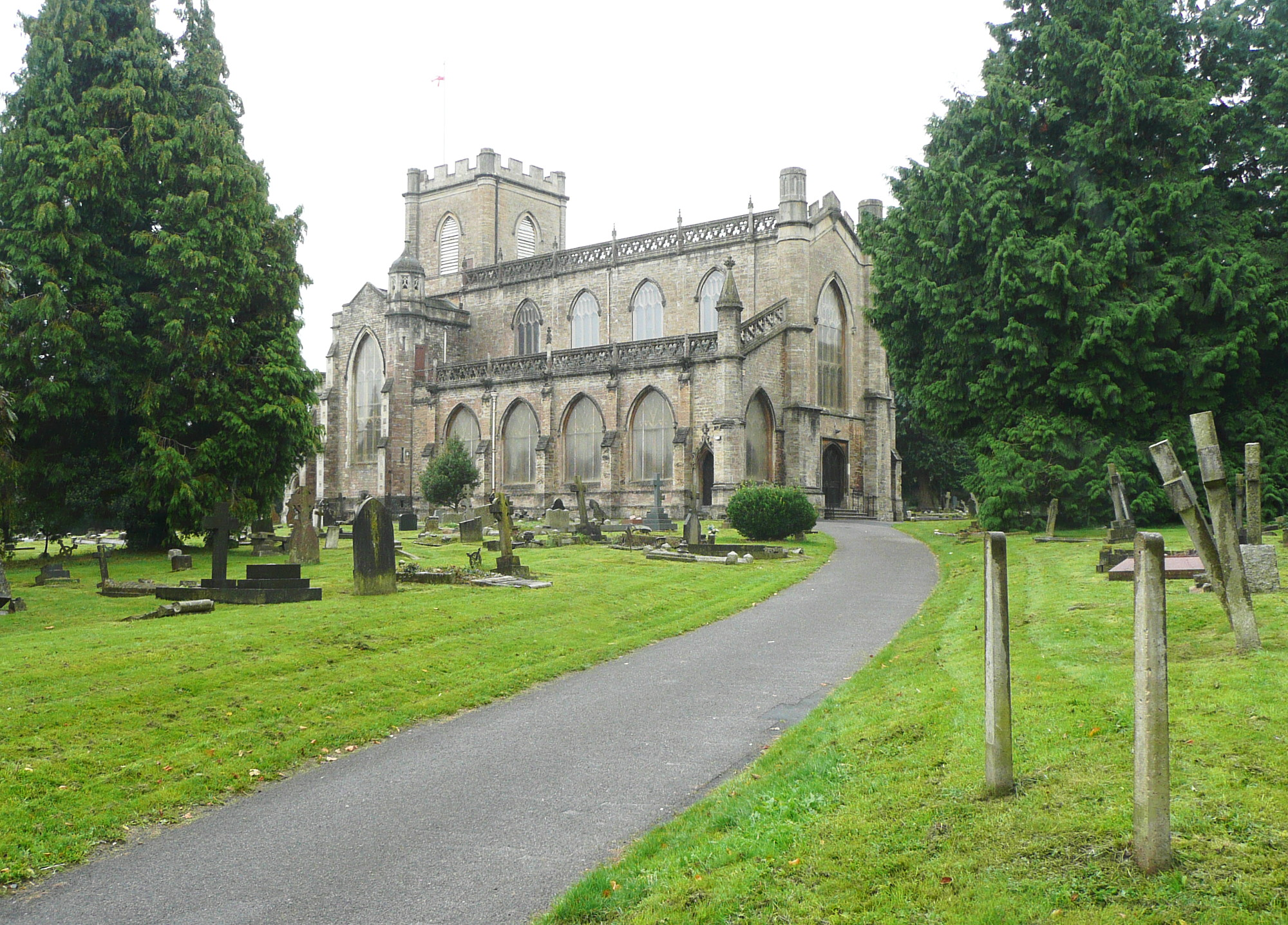

- Location within Somerset
- 51.2295°N 2.3260°W
- Location: Frome, Somerset, England

History
- Built: 1818

Site notes
- Architect: George Allen Underwood

Listed Building – Grade II*
- Official name: Christ Church
- Designated: 22 July 1949
- Reference no.: 1057853

The Anglican Christ Church in Frome, Somerset, England, was built in 1817 and 1818. It is a Grade II* listed building.

== History ==
The church was built in 1817 and 1818 by George Allen Underwood. It was built as a "free church" which meant that no-one paid pew rent.

The building was altered and extended in the late 19th and early 20th centuries. Further work to add a toilet and kitchen took place in 2014.

The parish is part of the benefice of Christ Church with Saint Mary's within the Diocese of Bath and Wells.

== Architecture ==
The stone building consists of a four-bay aisled nave and an east tower. The chancel in beneath the tower in the crossing.

The lady chapel was built on to the church in 1929 by Harold Brakspear and projects from the wall of the building. The tower is supported by clasping buttresses.

== See also ==
- List of ecclesiastical parishes in the Diocese of Bath and Wells
