= Christ Church, Rode =

Church in Somerset, England

Christ Church
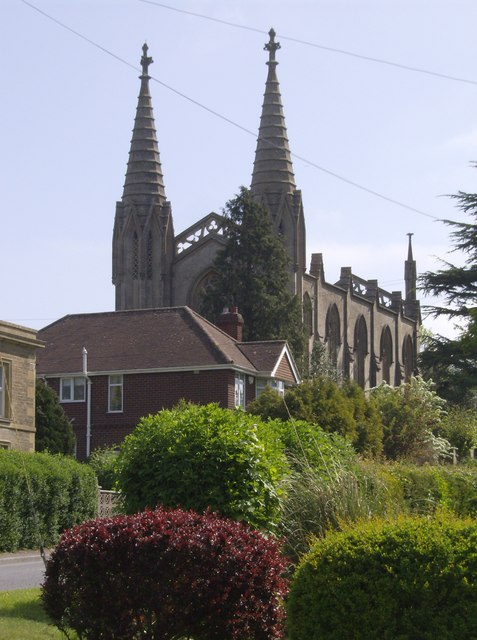

- Location within Somerset
- 51°17′10″N 2°16′45″W
- Location: Rode, Somerset, England

History
- Built: 1824

Listed Building – Grade II*
- Designated: 11 March 1968
- Reference no.: 1058062

The Anglican Church of St Peter in Rode, within the English county of Somerset, dates from 1824. It is a redundant church and a Grade II* listed building.

The church was built by Henry Goodridge for Charles Daubeny, the Archdeacon of Sarum. At that time Rode Hill was in Wiltshire while the adjacent village of Rode was in Somerset, and Daubeny wished to deter parishioners from attending Rode's church, St Lawrence, which was over the border and within the Diocese of Bath and Wells. Therefore he raised subscriptions for the building of the new church at Rode Hill.

The design with a tall nave and chancel was inspired by King's College Chapel, Cambridge. The church was a chapelry of North Bradley until 1933, when it was reassigned to the parish of Rode.

A bell cast for the church by Rudhall of Gloucester in 1823 did not have enough room to swing and was used for static chiming. When the church was declared redundant in 1995 and sold into private hands, the bell was obtained by the Keltek Trust and is now in a church in Menangle, New South Wales.

In the 1990s the fabric of the church was in need of repair and in 1993 a corbel fell into the church. Following this, insurance cover was withdrawn and insufficient funds could be found for the repair. After the church was made redundant, repairs were needed to the south steeple and roof which were supported by a grant from English Heritage.

The church now serves as a house and shop for Andrew Hooker Violins. It is also used for music concerts.
