= Mells Village Hall =

Building in Somerset, England

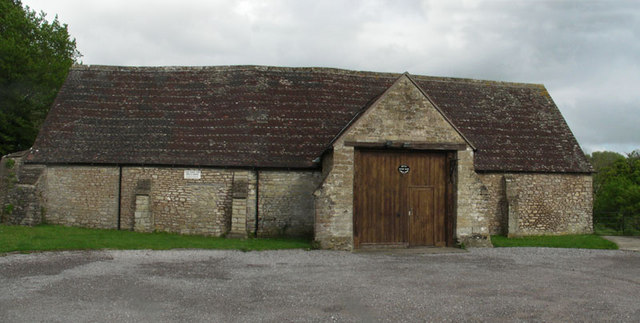

- Location within Somerset
- 51.2407°N 2.3890°W -->
- Location: Mells, Somerset, England

History
- Built: 14th century

Listed Building – Grade II*
- Official name: Mells Village Hall
- Designated: 11 March 1968
- Reference no.: 1058313

Mells Village Hall in Mells, Somerset, England was built in the 14th century as a tithe barn and now serves as the village hall. It is a Grade II* listed building.

== History ==
The hall was built as a tithe barn, belonging to Glastonbury Abbey, in the 14th century. A new roof was constructed and the building revised around 1500. A new ceiling was installed in the 20th century.

The hall is used as a village hall run by a charitable committee, following a lease and trust deed signed in 1964. Toilets and a kitchen have been installed which were refurbished in 2012.

== Architecture ==
The six-bay stone building has a tiled cruck roof. Buttresses are used to support the walls.
