= West Pennard =

Village in Somerset, England

Coordinates: 51.14395°N 2.65181°W

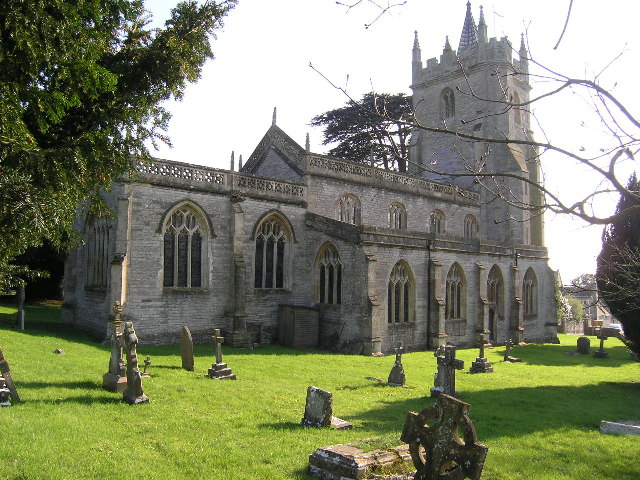
- Church of St Nicholas, West Pennard

- Location within Somerset
- Population: 670 (2011)
- OS grid reference: ST545385
- Unitary authority: Somerset Council
- Ceremonial county: Somerset
- Region: South West
- Country: England
- Sovereign state: United Kingdom
- Post town: GLASTONBURY
- Postcode district: BA6
- Dialling code: 01458
- Police: Avon and Somerset
- Fire: Devon and Somerset
- Ambulance: South Western
- UK Parliament: Frome and East Somerset

West Pennard (or West Pennard Manor) is a village and civil parish east of Glastonbury, situated at the foot of Pennard Hill, in Somerset, England. The parish includes the hamlets of Coxbridge and Woodlands.

== History ==
The village takes its name from the Old Welsh pen ard meaning 'high hill'.

The manor was granted to Glastonbury Abbey by the king of the Mercians in 681, and was held by the Abbey until the dissolution of the monasteries in 1539. It was then granted to Edward Seymour, Duke of Somerset in 1547 until his execution when it reverted to the Crown and leased to successive members of the Rogers family until 1628 when it was sold to Thomas Howard, Earl of Berkshire.

West Pennard features a number of historical settlements. Old Farmhouse, East Street dates from the mid 14th century and features crucks. Other sites such as Higher Southtown Farm, Pennard Farm (~1640), and Manor Farmhouse, Coxbridge were significantly altered in the latter part of the 16th century.

At least four houses dating from the 17th century exist. These include Sticklinch Manor, the Apple Tree inn, and a timber framed dwelling known as 'The Cottage' in Higher Southtown.

West Pennard Court Barn, dating from the 15th century, was built as a tithe barn for Glastonbury Abbey, and is now owned by the National Trust.

A field referred to as Millfurlong on Pennard Hill in 1515 indicates the presence of a windmill. Owing to decay the windmill had been rebuilt by 1606 and stood at Westerdown, remaining in operation until at least 1713.

The parish was part of the hundred of Glaston Twelve Hides.

== Culture and social ==
In 1861 a fair was run on the first Monday in August, and had transitioned to a cattle fair held on the last Monday in July by 1872. The fair ran until approximately 1902.

In 1837 a group of farmers presented Queen Victoria with a cheese created with the milk of 700 cows for the anniversary of her coronation. An octagonal mould made of Spanish mahogany was created (a replica of which is in the village hall) featuring laurels and oak leaves. On 28 June seven of the largest cheese tubs in West Pennard were borrowed, and the cheese was made to cannon fire and the ringing of church bells at the farm of George Naish. The initial pressing stuck to the mould and was reset in the mould after partial treatment. Delivering the 1/2 ton cheese measuring over 37 inches across and 22 inches high to Buckingham Palace Queen Victoria reportedly declared that she preferred her cheese "mature, and not new", sending them away whilst it matured. During this period the cheese was displayed at the Egyptian Hall, Piccadilly. After being ejected from the Egyptian Hall the cheese ended up at a farm in Sticklinch, before ending up at the Old Down Inn. The cheese was not said to be good, and fed to pigs.

The Red Lion pub featured in a 2015 television advert promoting the Rugby World Cup.

West Pennard village hall was gifted by Lady Mostyn of West Pennard House in memory of her husband and opened in 1937.

== Governance ==
The parish council has responsibility for local issues, including setting an annual precept (local rate) to cover the council's operating costs and producing annual accounts for public scrutiny. The parish council evaluates local planning applications and works with the local police, district council officers, and neighbourhood watch groups on matters of crime, security, and traffic. The parish council's role also includes initiating projects for the maintenance and repair of parish facilities, as well as consulting with the district council on the maintenance, repair, and improvement of highways, drainage, footpaths, public transport, and street cleaning. Conservation matters (including trees and listed buildings) and environmental issues are also the responsibility of the council.

For local government purposes, since 1 April 2023, the village comes under the unitary authority of Somerset Council. Prior to this, it was part of the non-metropolitan district of Mendip, which was formed on 1 April 1974 under the Local Government Act 1972, having previously been part of Wells Rural District.

The village falls in 'The Pennards and Ditcheat' electoral ward. From West Pennard the ward stretches through East Pennard to Ditcheat. The total population of the ward taken at the 2011 census is 2,180.

The village is also part of the Frome and East Somerset county constituency represented in the House of Commons of the Parliament of the United Kingdom. It elects one Member of Parliament (MP) by the first past the post system of election.

== Transport ==
West Pennard railway station was a station on the Highbridge branch of the Somerset and Dorset Joint Railway, and briefly featured in Branch Line Railway, a BBC documentary on the Joint Railway presented by John Betjeman. It opened in 1862 and closed in 1966.

The A361 passes through West Pennard running east–west, first being described as the 'great road going to Pilton' in 1235. Maintenance was once the responsibility of a pontarius whose other duties included caring for a Saxon bridge at Steanbow, later replaced. By 1780 the road was the responsibility of the Shepton trust.

Connectivity reduced somewhat during the 18th century with the closure of a road running past West Pennard church, along the lower slopes of Pennard Hill, East Street and ultimately through Norwood Park, linking Bruton to Glastonbury. A road taking a similar route from West Bradley to Wells also closed during this period.

== Religious sites ==
The Church of St Nicholas dates from the 15th century and is a Grade I listed building. The churchyard cross, which was built between 1493 and 1524 by Abbot Richard Beere of Glastonbury, is also Grade I listed.

The Piltown Wesleyan Methodist chapel built in 1847 closed in 1964 and is now a private residence. The adjourning day school was opened in 1878, but had closed by 1931 owing to falling attendance.

== Images ==
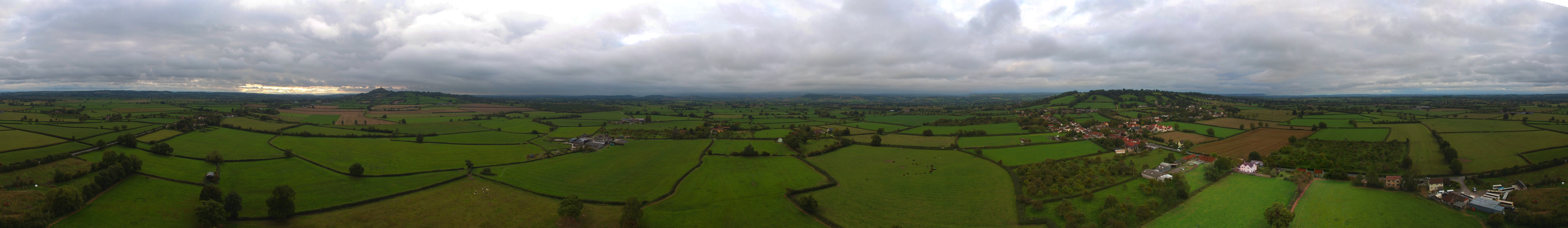
West Pennard aerial panorama
