= Wanstrow =

Village in Somerset, England

Coordinates: 51.172°N 2.409°W

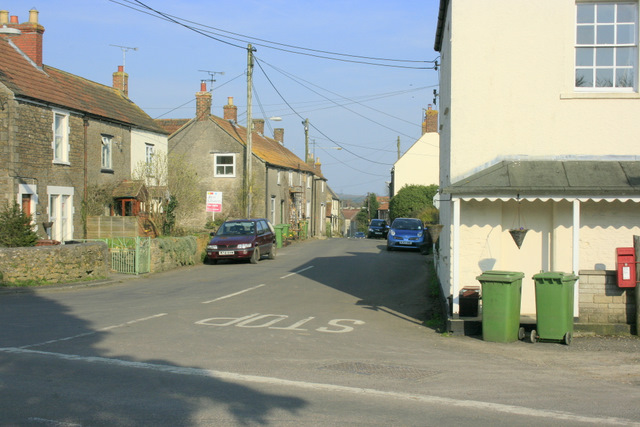

- Location within Somerset
- Population: 489 (2011)
- OS grid reference: ST715415
- Unitary authority: Somerset Council
- Ceremonial county: Somerset
- Region: South West
- Country: England
- Sovereign state: United Kingdom
- Post town: SHEPTON MALLET
- Postcode district: BA4
- Dialling code: 01749
- Police: Avon and Somerset
- Fire: Devon and Somerset
- Ambulance: South Western
- UK Parliament: Frome and East Somerset

Wanstrow is a village and civil parish 6 miles (9.7 km) south west of Frome in Somerset, England. The parish includes the village of Cloford.

== History ==
The name of the village comes from the Old English and means Waendel's tree.

The Bishop of Wells had an estate in the parish before the Norman Conquest which supported a prebend at Wells Cathedral. The estate was split in two with one first called East Wanstrow, and later Church Wanstrow supporting Wells Cathedral and West Wanstrow, Wanstrow Rogers and Wanstrow Buller was given by Hugh Sexey to support the hospital at Bruton.

The parish was part of the hundred of Frome.

The village was involved in the production of coarse earthenware, using clay dug on Wanstrow Common, until 1826.

== Governance ==
The parish council has responsibility for local issues, including setting an annual precept (local rate) to cover the council’s operating costs and producing annual accounts for public scrutiny. The parish council evaluates local planning applications and works with the local police, district council officers, and neighbourhood watch groups on matters of crime, security, and traffic. The parish council's role also includes initiating projects for the maintenance and repair of parish facilities, as well as consulting with the district council on the maintenance, repair, and improvement of highways, drainage, footpaths, public transport, and street cleaning. Conservation matters (including trees and listed buildings) and environmental issues are also the responsibility of the council.

For local government purposes, since 1 April 2023, the village comes under the unitary authority of Somerset Council. Prior to this, it was part of the non-metropolitan district of Mendip, which was formed on 1 April 1974 under the Local Government Act 1972, having previously been part of Frome Rural District.

It is also part of the Frome and East Somerset county constituency represented in the House of Commons of the Parliament of the United Kingdom. It elects one Member of Parliament (MP) by the first past the post system of election.

== Geography ==
Cloford Quarry is a 39.92 hectare geological Site of Special Scientific Interest and Geological Conservation Review site important for the exposures of sediments of Triassic and Jurassic age which occur in major fissures within the Carboniferous Limestone. No other site in Britain shows such a variety and abundance of sediment-infilled fissures of this age. Cloford Quarry was the main location used for the planet Lakertya in the Doctor Who story Time and the Rani.

Leighton Road Cutting is another geological Site of Special Scientific Interest between East Cranmore and Cloford which provides exposure of a series of early Jurassic limestones, of Lower Lias age, which are the only known outcrops of these particular rocks to occur in a normal horizontally-bedded sequence in the Mendips.

== Transport ==
Wanstrow railway station was a small station on the East Somerset Railway which opened in 1858, but the railway company did not build a station at Wanstrow. Local people paid for a small building, and a platform was built later. The station opened on 1 January 1860. It closed to passenger traffic with the rest of the line on 9 September 1963.

== Landmarks ==
The manor house was built in the 17th century and has been designated as a Grade II* listed building.

== Religious sites ==
In Cloford there is a Norman church, dedicated to St Mary, dates from the 15th century and was rebuilt in 1856. It is Grade II* listed.

In Wanstrow itself there is another 15th-century church, Church of St Mary.

== Notable residents ==
Wanstrow is the birthplace of Joseph Harding, the "father of cheddar cheese".
