= Church of St Thomas, Wells =

Church in Somerset, England

Church of St Thomas
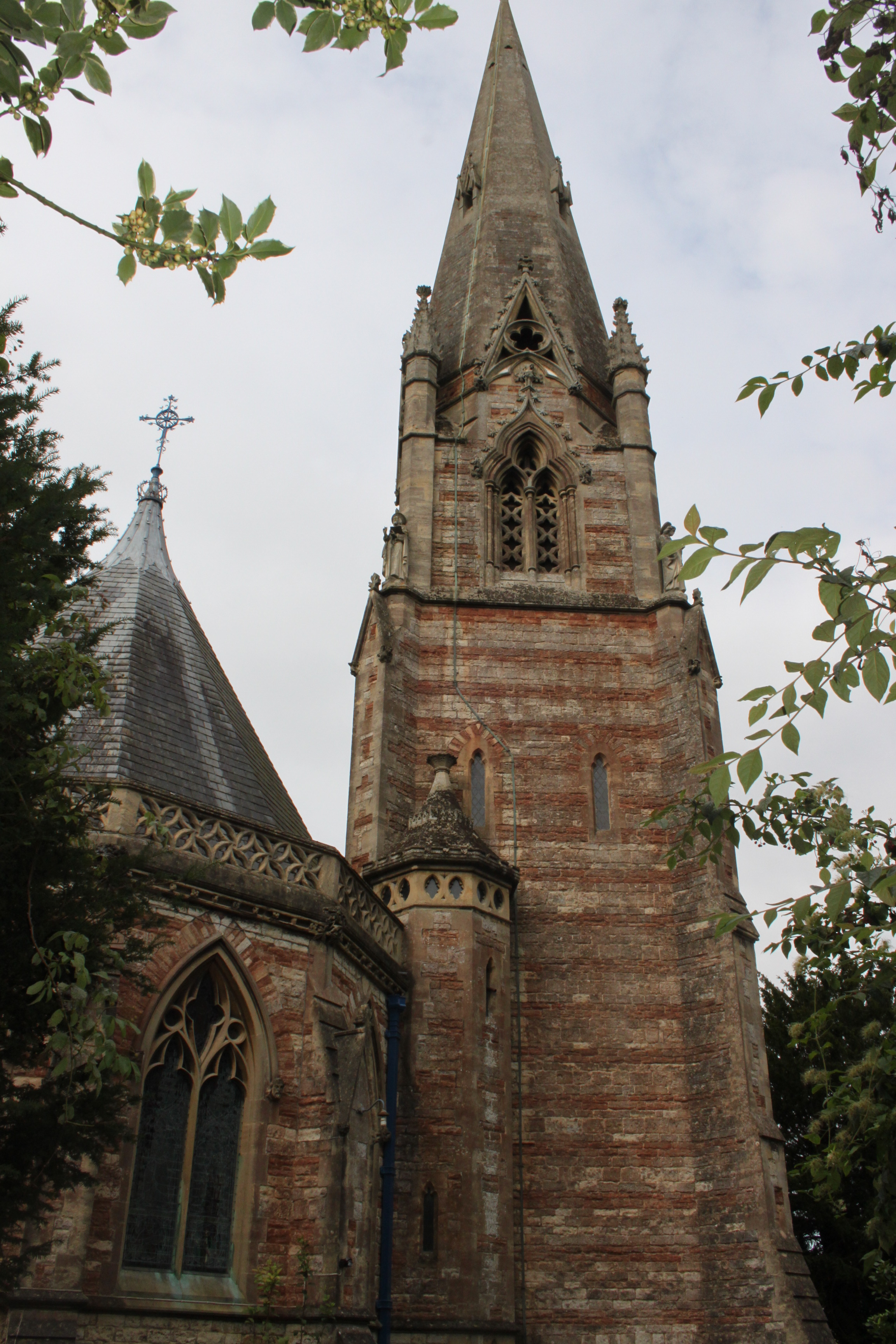

- Location within Somerset
- 51.2129°N 2.6370°W
- Location: Wells, Somerset, England

Listed Building – Grade II*
- Official name: Church of St Thomas
- Designated: 13 September 1972
- Reference no.: 1383153

The Church of St Thomas in Wells, Somerset, England, was built in the 1850s. It is a Grade II* listed building.

== History ==
The church was built during 1856 and 1857. It was extended by Samuel Sanders Teulon in 1864.

The church commemorates the work of Richard Jenkyns the Dean of Wells who had cared for the poor in the east of the city.

In 2017 the refurbishment of the church included the installation of a servery and community room, which will be used for concerts and other events.

The parish is part of the benefice of Wells St Thomas with Horrington within the Diocese of Bath and Wells.

On 18 February 2022, during Storm Eunice, the tip of the church's spire fell to the ground. The spire was restored with reinforcement added to stop it falling over in the future.

== Architecture ==
The polychromatic stone building has Doulting stone dressings and a slate roof. It consists of a five-bay nave, chancel, south aisle and a north porch. Beneath the tower and spire are the vestry and organ chamber.

The stained glass is by William Wailes.

== See also ==
- List of ecclesiastical parishes in the Diocese of Bath and Wells
