= Church of St Hugh, Charterhouse =

Church in Somerset, England

Church of St Hugh
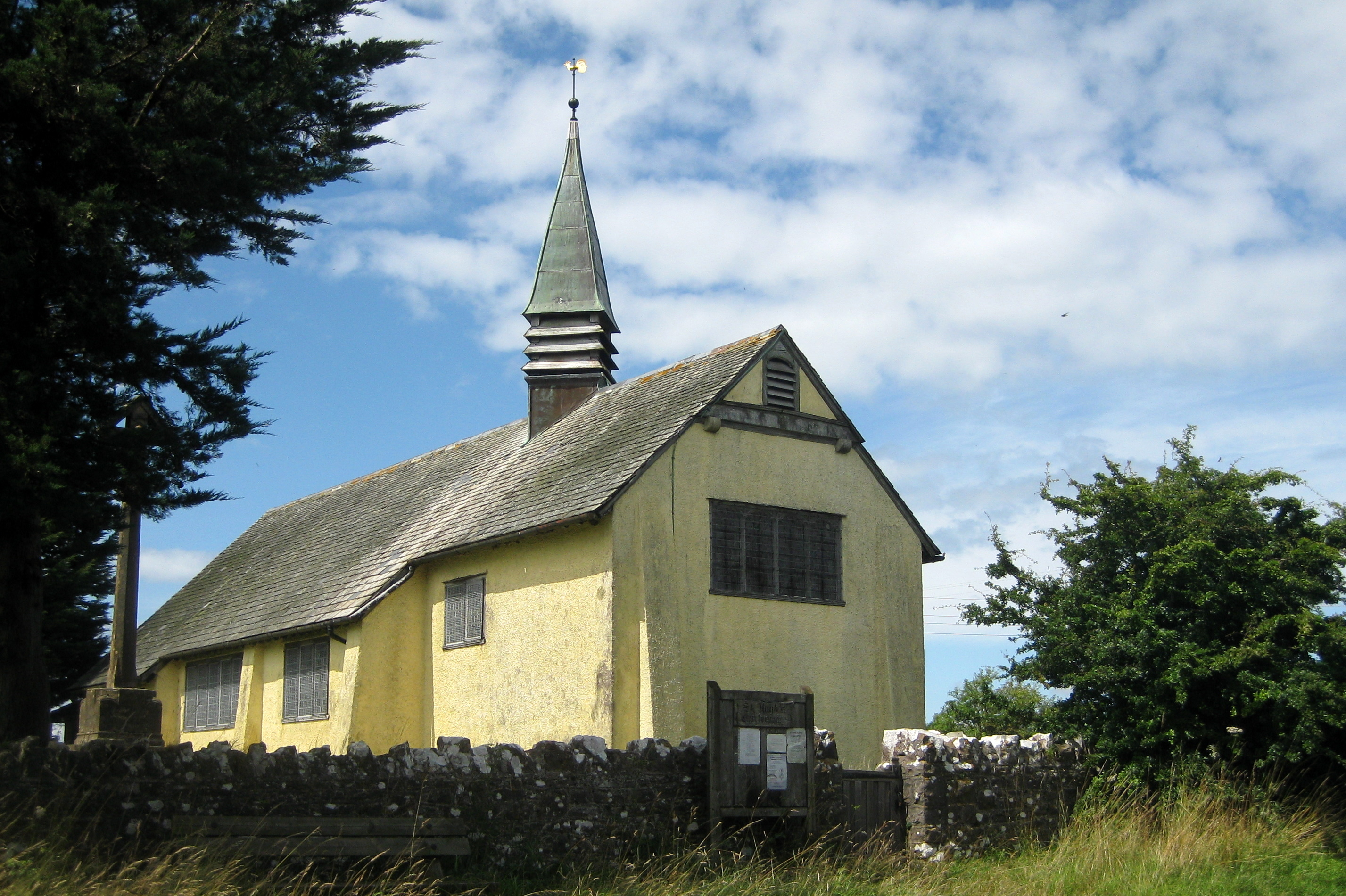

- Location within Somerset
- 51°17′52″N 2°43′00″W
- Location: Charterhouse, Somerset, England

History
- Built: 1908

Listed Building – Grade II*
- Designated: 9 February 1961
- Reference no.: 1307304

The Anglican Church of St Hugh in Charterhouse, within the English county of Somerset, dates from 1908. It is a Grade II* listed building. The church is dedicated to Hugh of Lincoln. It was built in 1908 by W. D. Caröe, on the initiative of the Rev. Menzies Lambrick, from the former welfare hall for the local lead miners.

The roof-truss, screen, rood, and altar are all made of carved whitened oak, with fittings in the Arts and Crafts style. The walls are rough brick and it has a tiled roof. It includes stained glass by Horace Wilkinson showing the nativity scene.

A cross in the churchyard and the churchyard wall are also listed buildings.

It is part of the benefice of Blagdon with Compton Martin and Ubley within the Diocese of Bath and Wells.
