= Church of St Mary, Cloford =

Church in Somerset, England

Church of St Mary
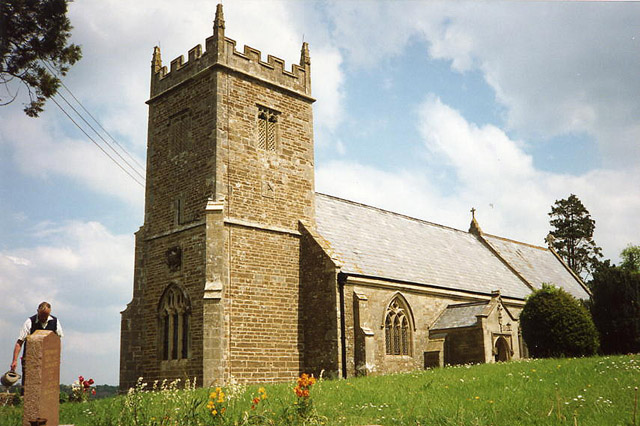

- Location within Somerset
- 51.1944°N 2.3930°W
- Location: Cloford, Wanstrow, Somerset, England

Listed Building – Grade II*
- Official name: Church of St Mary
- Designated: 11 March 1968
- Reference no.: 1295509

The Church of St Mary in Cloford, Wanstrow, Somerset, England was built in the 15th century. It is a Grade II* listed building.

== History ==
The church dates from the 15th century but had a Victorian restoration, during which it was largely rebuilt, in 1856 and the chancel was further extended in 1869.

The parish is part of the Postlebury benefice within the Diocese of Bath and Wells.

== Architecture ==
The church is built of Doulting stone and has a tiled roof. It includes a chancel and nave which has an east chapel. The two-stage west tower is supported by diagonal buttresses.

The interior includes an 11th-century tub font and memorials to the Horner family who were the Lords of the manor. The font is a conical bowl on a plinth.
