= Merchant's House, Shepton Mallet =

Merchant's House
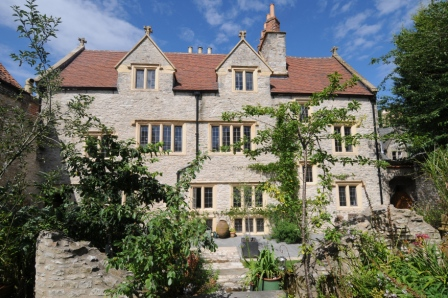
- South Elevation

- Location within Somerset
- 51°11′26″N 2°32′45″W
- Location: Shepton Mallet, Somerset, England

History
- Built: Circa 1675-1680

Listed Building – Grade II*
- Official name: 8, Market Place
- Designated: 20 May 1952
- Reference no.: 1058457

The Merchant's House at Number 8, Market Place, Shepton Mallet, Somerset, England was built around 1675 and has been designated as a Grade II* listed building. The date of construction was confirmed by dendrochronology.

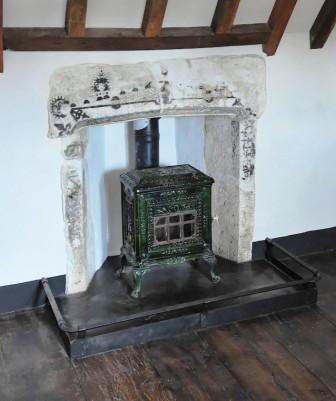
When this fireplace — broken and covered in lime-wash — was discovered in 1995, no one had seen this style of decoration before. Consequently, the Merchant's House was regraded as a 2* from a grade 2.

== History ==
The Merchant's House was built by Edward Strode (c. 1629–1703), a wealthy landowner, to be tenanted. (Edward was a son of Colonel William Strode, a Parliamentarian officer and Member of Parliament.) Shepton Mallet was then a wealthy town on the back of the wool trade so the south range of the house was almost certainly built for a wool merchant. The north was two tenements with two shop units.

When Strode died the house was bequeathed to his daughters with the condition that £8 per year (about £1,700 today) be used to finance a charitable donation of bread to feed the local poor. It passed out of the Strode family in 1756.

In the 20th century the house suffered serious neglect and vandalism.

Since 2004 the building has been renovated with around 5% funding from English Heritage and Mendip Council, receiving the William Stansell/SBPT Building Award from the Somerset Buildings Preservation Trust in 2008. In 2009 the renovation was recognised with a special award from Mendip Council.

The restoration and conservation included 80 new leaded lights and 27 new metal casements. The work undertaken was shown in a programme of the BBC2 series Restore to Glory. The building was in a parlous state prior to work and was included on both national and regional buildings at risk registers.
