= Church of St Mary, Chesterblade =

Church in Somerset, England

Church of St Mary
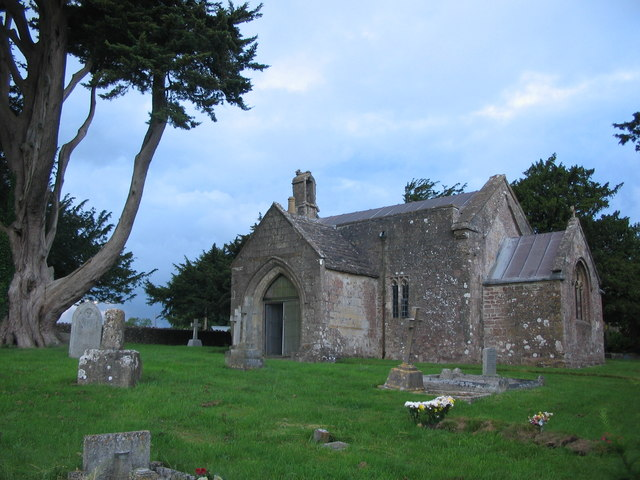

- Location within Somerset
- 51.1693°N 2.4862°W
- Location: Chesterblade, Somerset, England

History
- Built: 12th century

Listed Building – Grade II*
- Official name: Church of St Mary
- Designated: 2 June 1961
- Reference no.: 1222368

The Anglican Church of St Mary in Chesterblade, Somerset, England was built in the 12th century. It is a Grade II* listed building. It is located 3 miles northeast of Evercreech (to which parish it belongs), and three miles south east of Shepton Mallet.

== History ==
The church was first built in the 12th century and revised in the 13th and 15th centuries, with Victorian restoration in 1888. The church was linked with St John's Priory, Wells.

The parish of Evercreech with Chesterblade is part of the Alham Vale benefice within the Diocese of Bath and Wells.

== Architecture ==
The church consists of a three-bay nave with a south porch and a chancel. Above the nave is a small bellcote. It has a king post roof.

The chancel includes some Jacobean panelling. The stone pulpit is 15th century, but the font is Norman. The font stands on Victorian encaustic tiles with an octagonal plinth. The bowl is 0.89 metres (2 ft 11 in) high.
