= Church of St Peter and St Paul, Kilmersdon =

Church in Somerset, England

Church of St Peter and St Paul
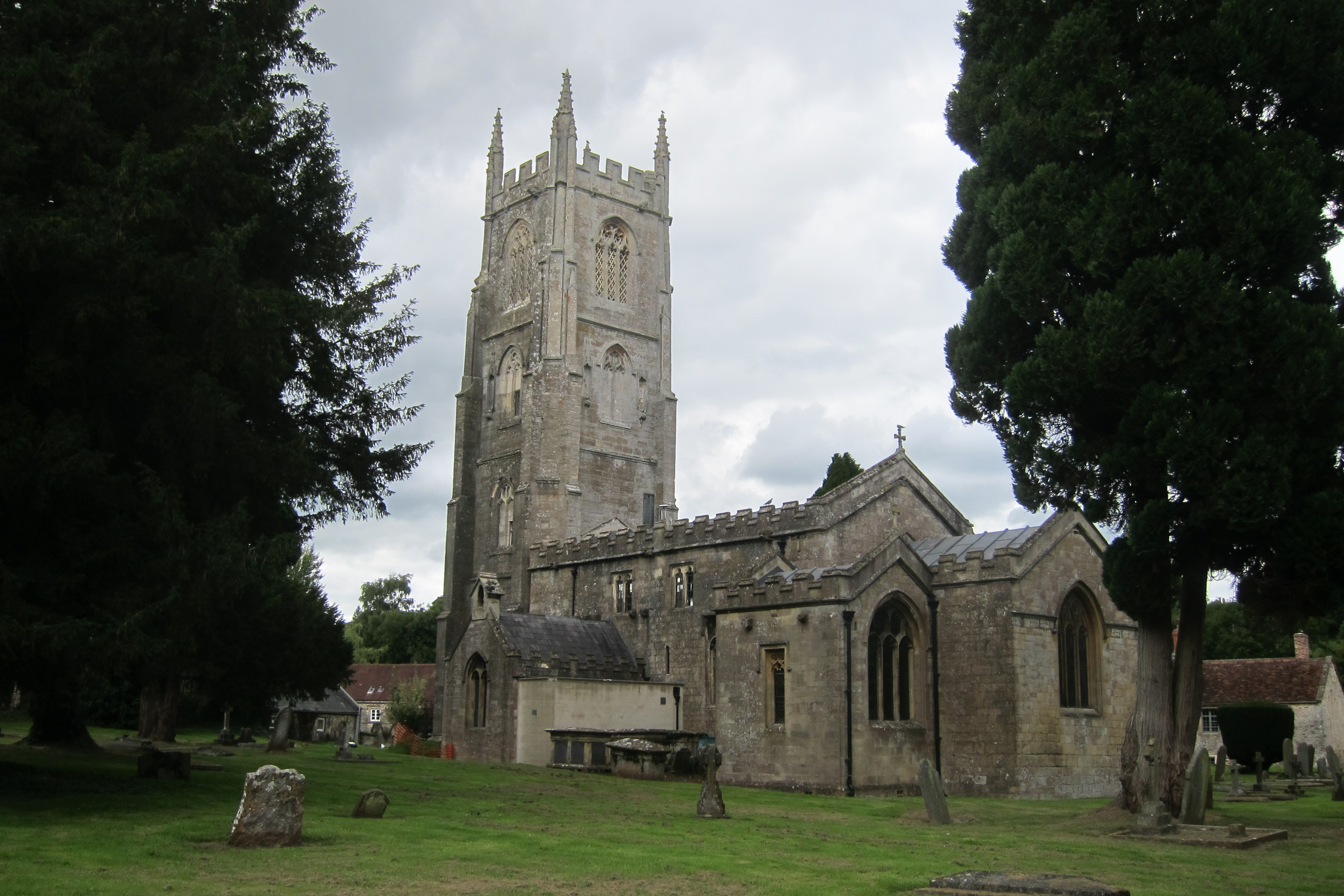

- Location within Somerset

General information
- Location: Kilmersdon, England
- Coordinates: 51.2702°N 2.437°W
- Completed: 16th century

The Anglican Church of St Peter and St Paul in Kilmersdon, Somerset, England, dates back to the Norman period, though much of the current structure was built during the 15th and 16th centuries and restored in the Victorian era. It is a Grade I listed building.

The tower, which was built around 1443, is in four stages, includes corner buttresses with shafts and pinnacles, and is connected across the angle. The tower contains a ring of six bells, the heaviest being a tenor of 21 cwt. There are traceried 3-light bell-chamber windows with a dense quatrefoil interlace and blank 2-light windows on the two lower stages. The flanked niches were for statuary, however this is now missing.

The churchyard has a triangular lychgate designed by Sir Edwin Lutyens.

Several of the chest tombs and headstones in the churchyard are also listed buildings.

In 2013 the church was added to the Heritage at Risk Register because of the repairs needed to the roof and tower. In November 2013 a bell fell through two floors of the tower, but came to rest on rafters above the bellringers.

The parish is part of the benefice of Kilmersdon with Babington within the Diocese of Bath and Wells.

== Gallery ==
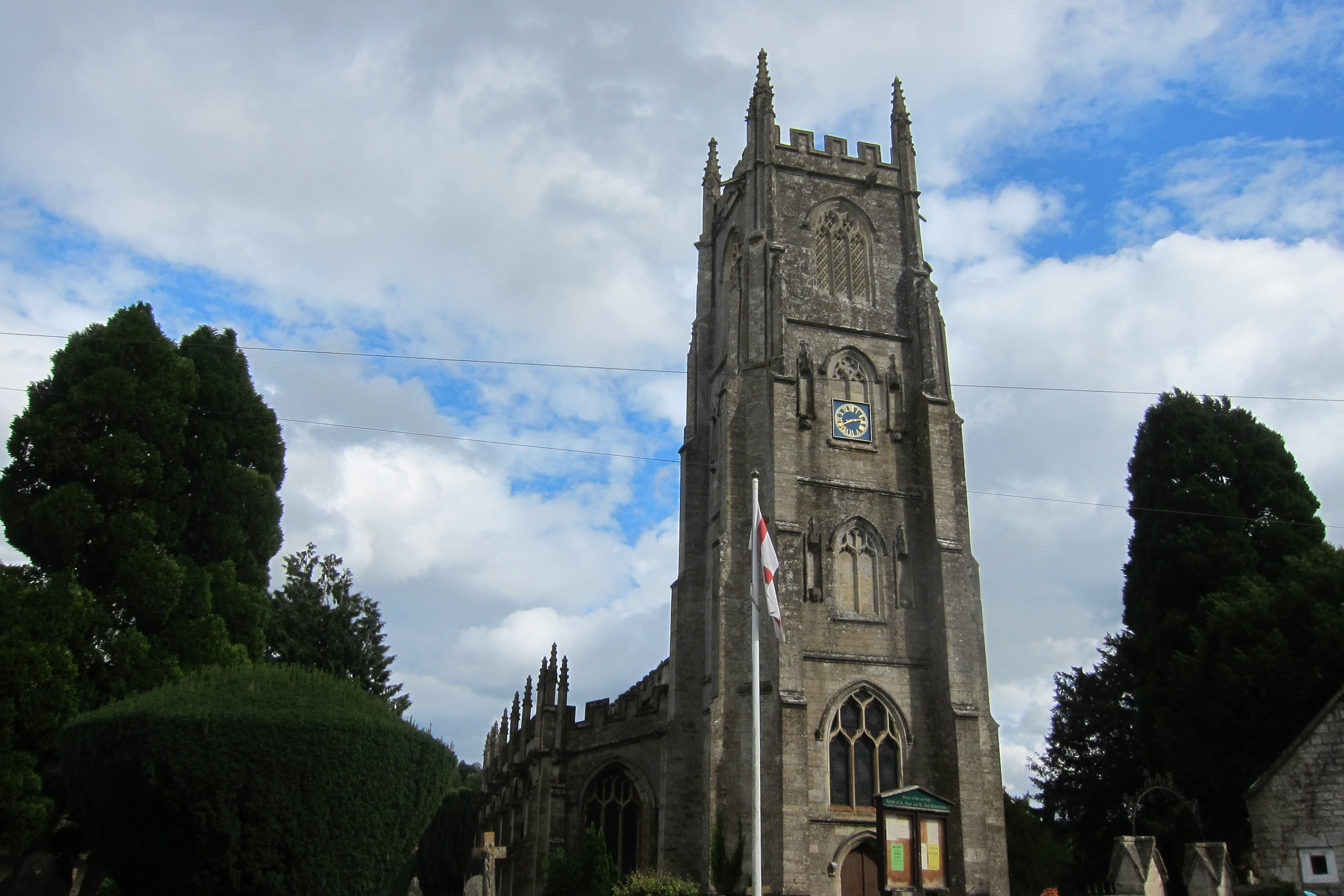
Church of St Peter and St Paul, Kilmersdon

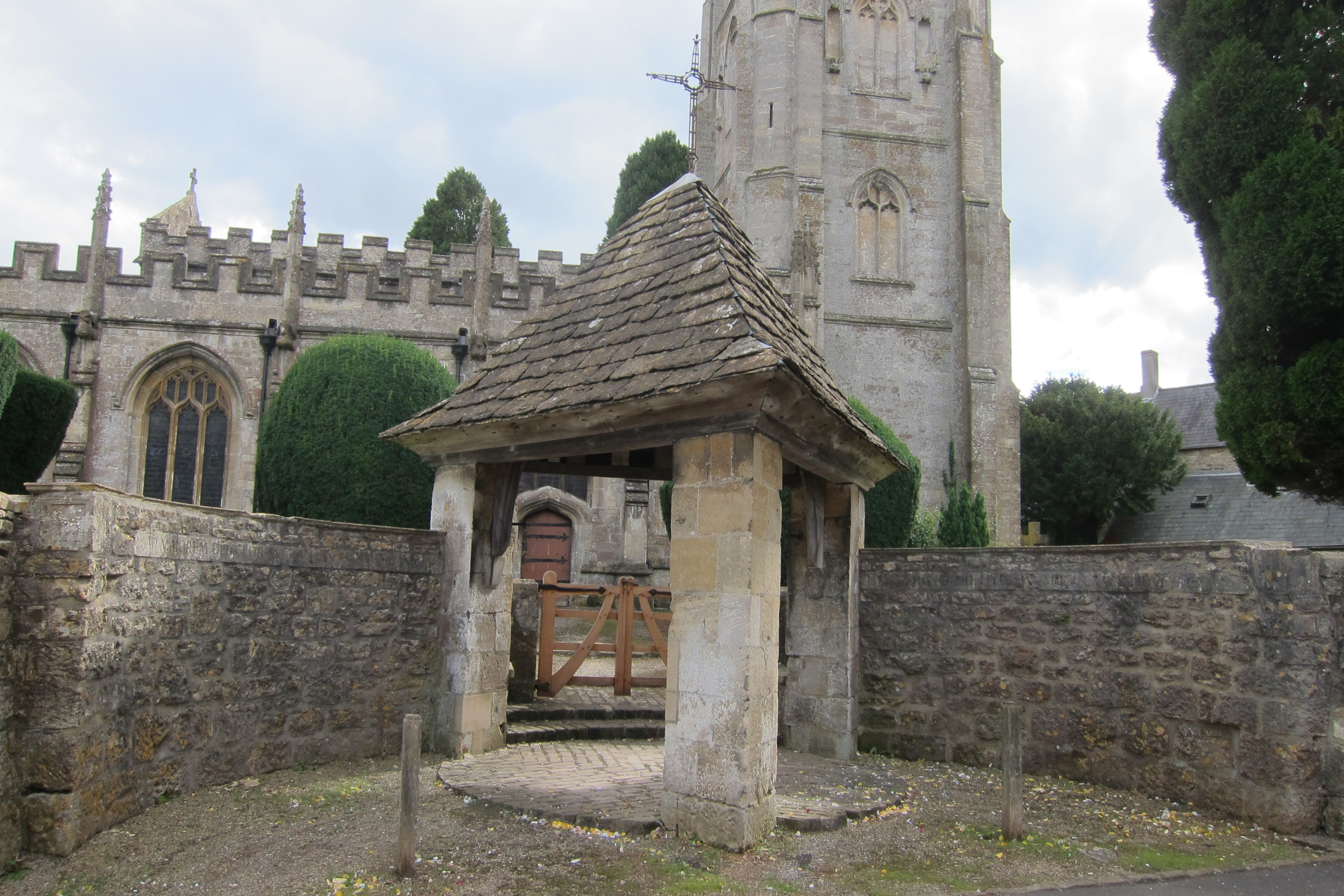
Lych Gate, flanking walls and gates on north side of Church of St Peter and St Paul

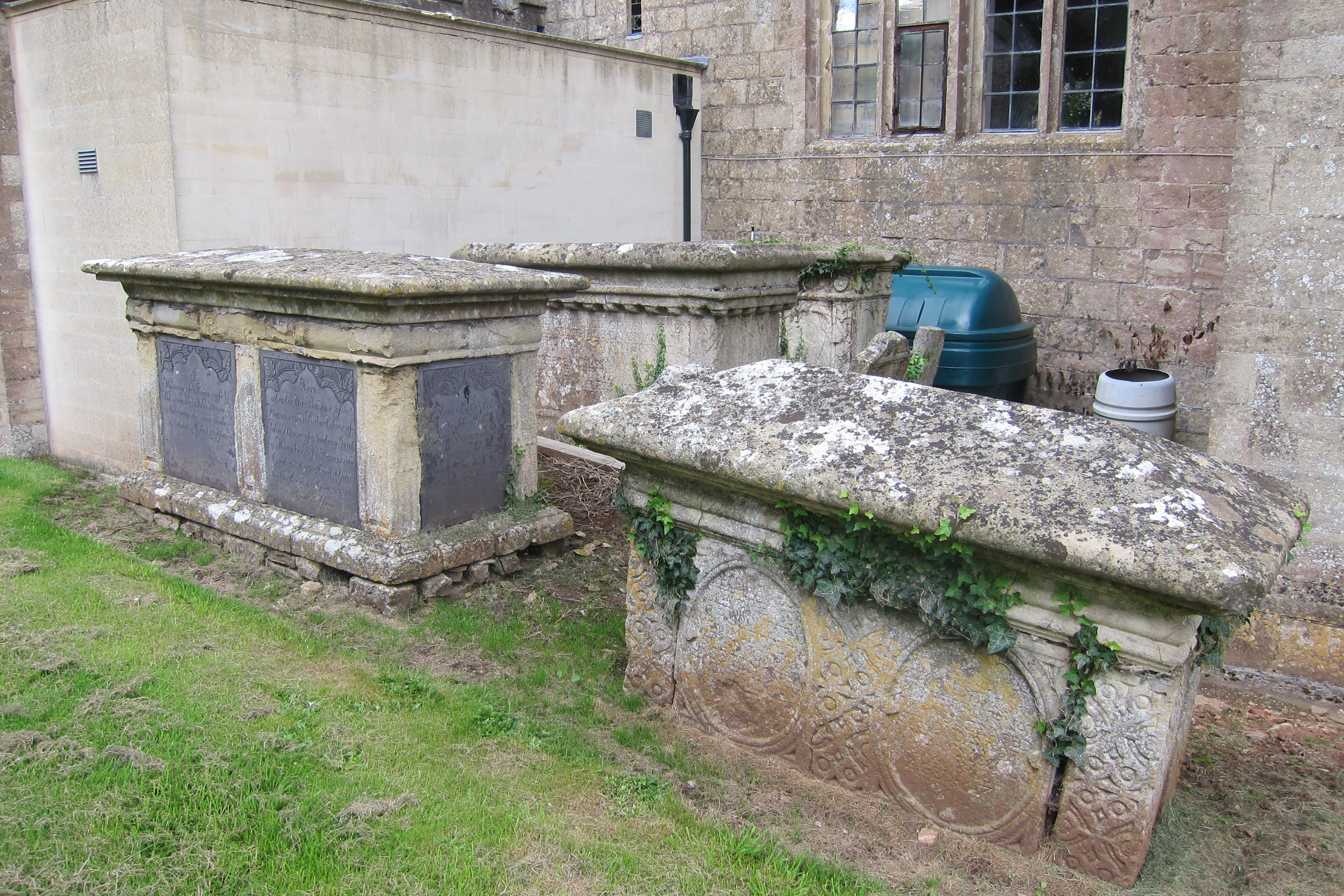
Group of 7 monuments in churchyard, adjacent to nave, Church of St Peter and St Paul

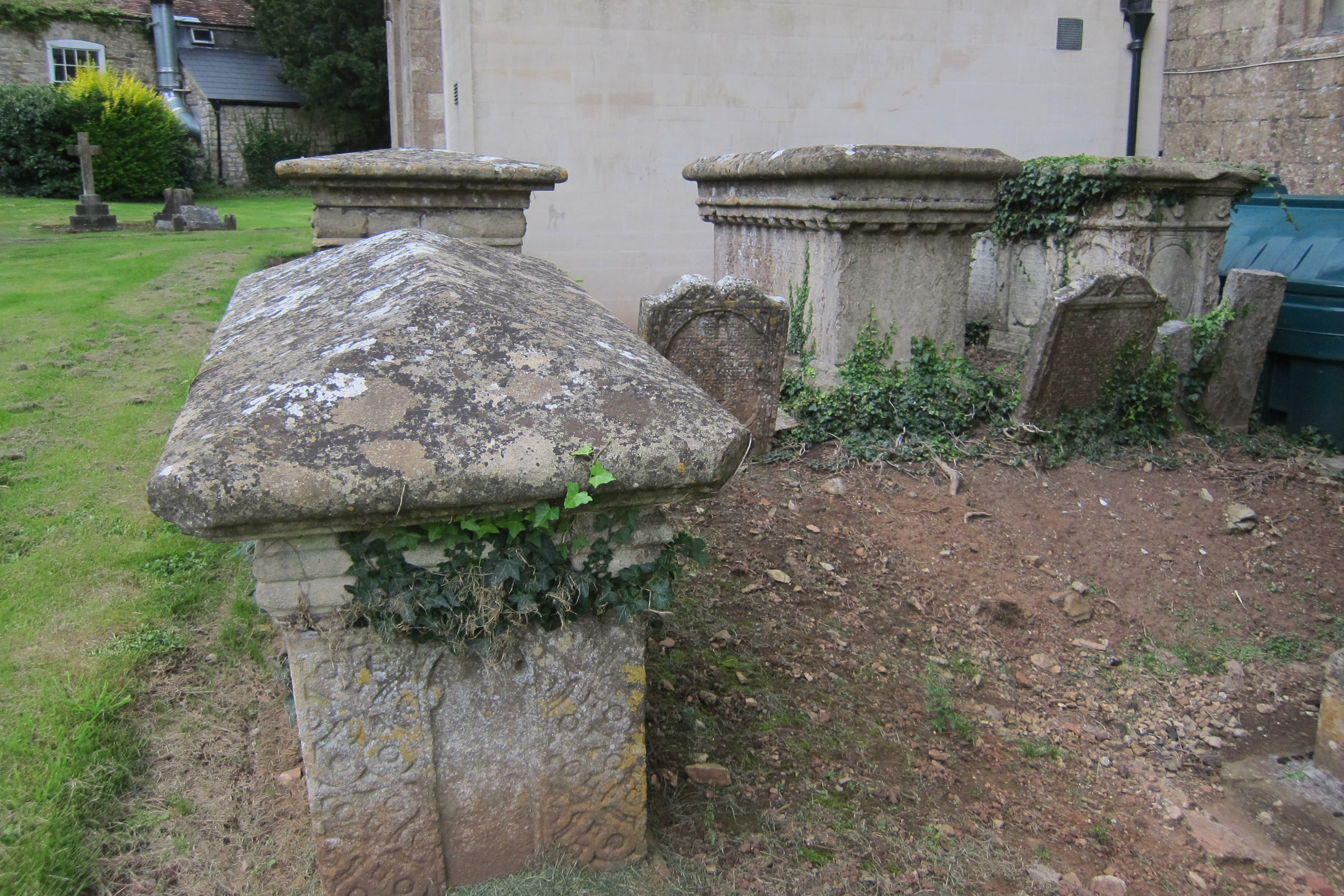
Group of 7 monuments in churchyard, adjacent to nave, Church of St Peter and St Paul

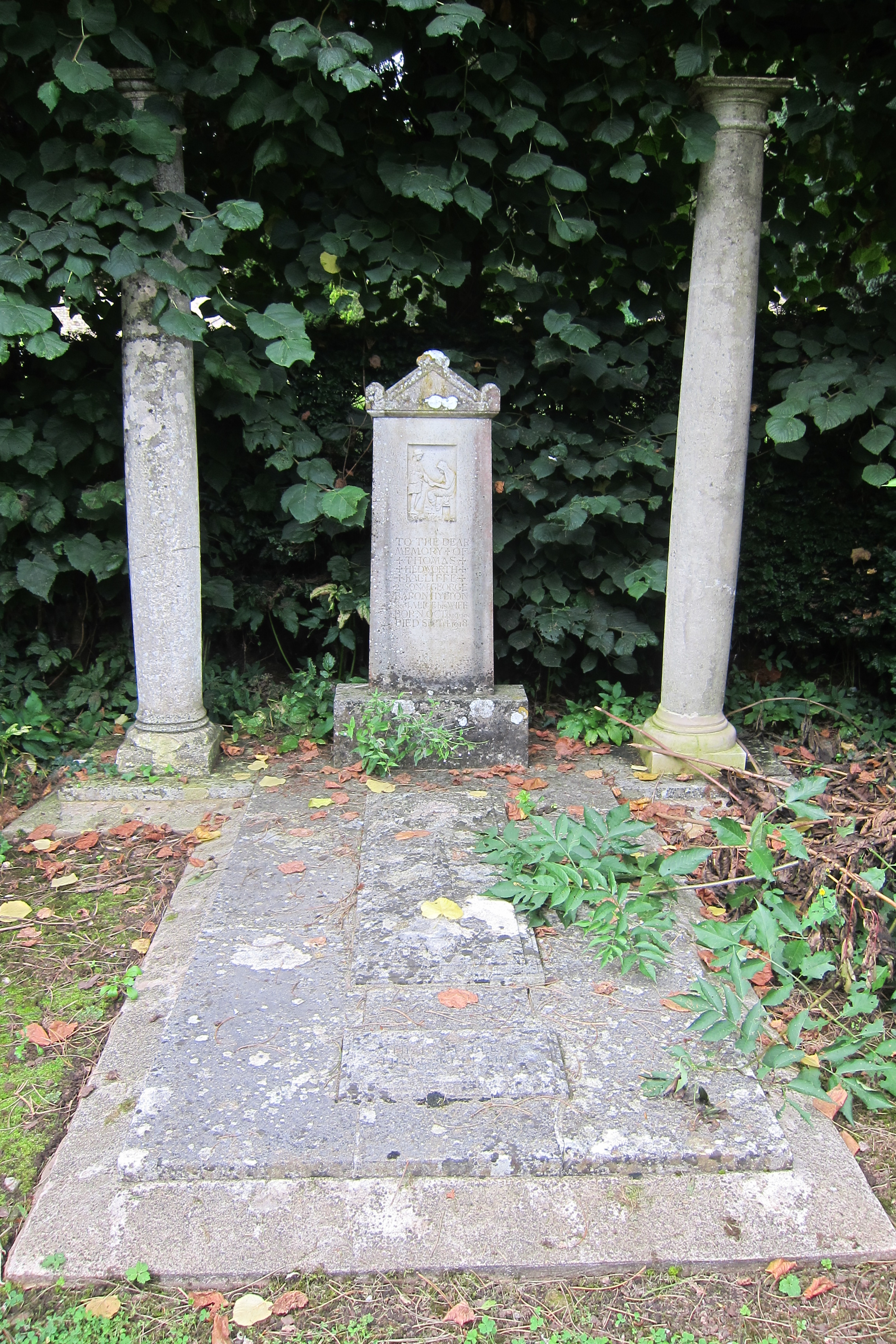
Thomas Jolliffe Monument In Churchyard, About 50 Metres South East Of Church Of St Peter And St Paul

== See also ==
- List of Grade I listed buildings in Mendip
- List of towers in Somerset
- List of ecclesiastical parishes in the Diocese of Bath and Wells
