= Church of St James The Less, Foxcote =

Church in Somerset, England

Church of St James The Less
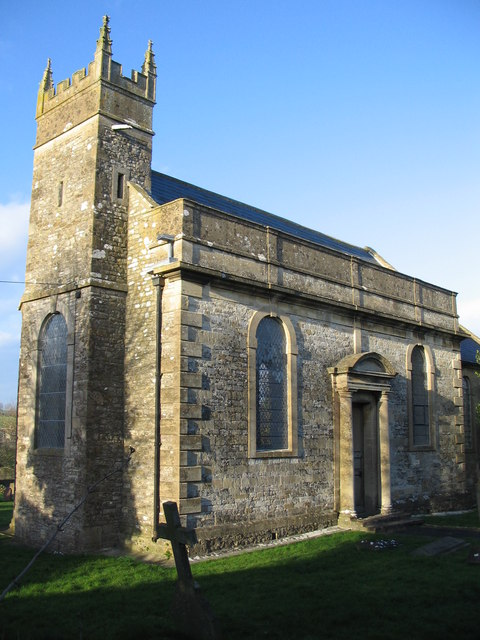

- Location within Somerset
- 51°17′55″N 2°24′34″W
- Location: Somerset, England

History
- Built: Early 18th century

Listed Building – Grade II*
- Designated: 11 March 1968
- Reference no.: 1058709

The Anglican Church of St James The Less in Foxcote, within the English county of Somerset, was rebuilt in the early 18th century incorporating a 15th-century bell turret. It is a Grade II* listed building.

The church was dedicated to James the Less. Inside the church is a Jacobean altar table.

Services take place at St. James' Church Foxcote from Easter Sunday to end of October each year. The services then move to the chapel in Shoscombe from November to Palm Sunday.

The parish is part of the benefice of Peasedown St John with Wellow and Foxcote with Shoscombe within the Diocese of Bath and Wells.
