= Church of All Saints, Downhead =

Church in Somerset, England

Church Of All Saints
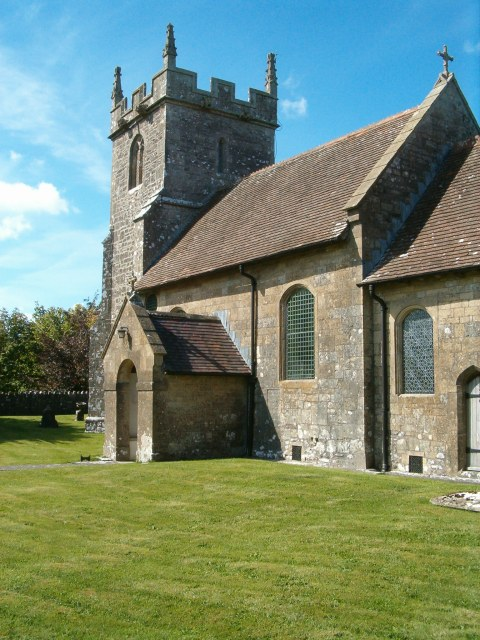

- Location within Somerset
- 51°12′51″N 2°26′34″W
- Location: Downhead, Somerset, England

History
- Built: 14th century

Listed Building – Grade II*
- Designated: 27 November 1984
- Reference no.: 1174065

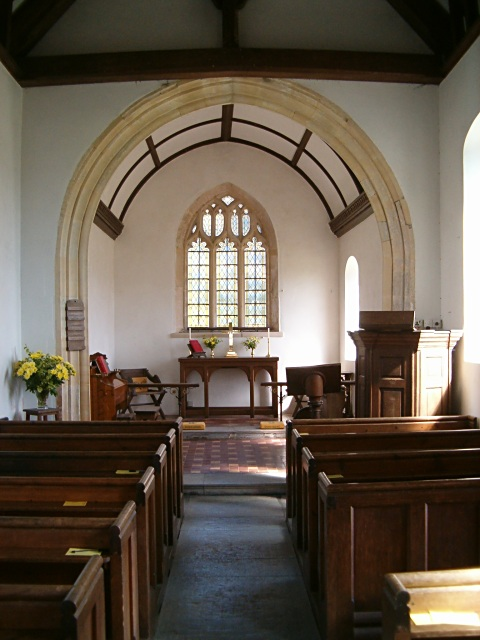
Interior of the church

The Anglican Church Of All Saints in Downhead, within the English county of Somerset, dates from the 14th century. It is a Grade II* listed building.

The tower was built in the 14th and the church has an 18th-century nave and chancel. The porch was added in 1751. The church tower contains three bells cast in 1782 by William Bilbie of Chew Stoke.

The interior of the church contains a Norman font and 18th century pulpit.

In 2007 funding from the levy on nearby quarries was obtained to pay for repair and restoration work on the bells.

The parish is part of the benefice of Leigh-upon-Mendip with Downhead within the Diocese of Bath and Wells.
