= The Abbey, Ditcheat =

Building in Ditcheat, Somerset, England

Coordinates: 51°7′24″N 2°32′21″W

The Abbey
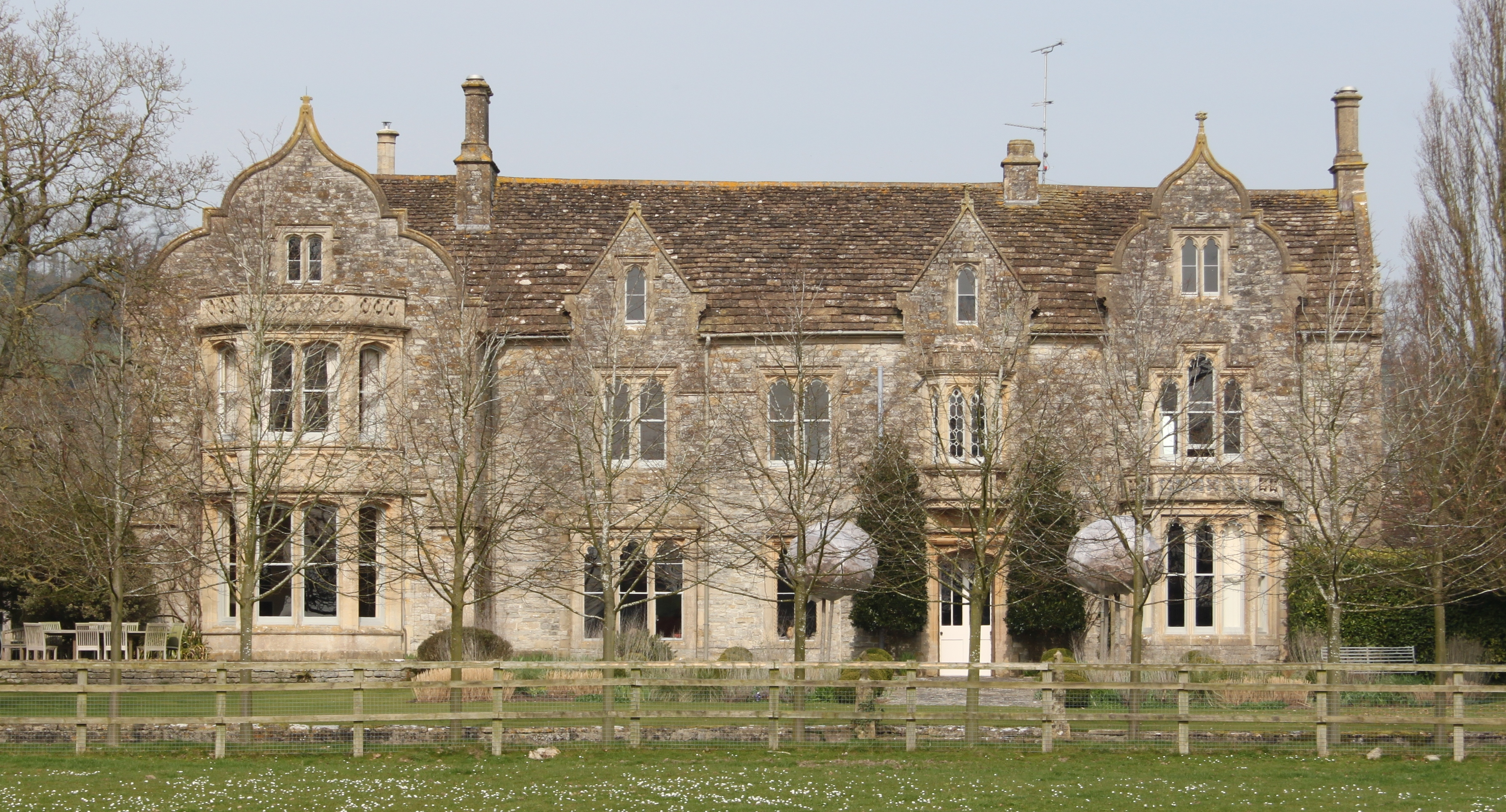
- Interactive map of the The Abbey area

General information
- Location: Ditcheat, England
- Construction started: 1473
- Client: John Gunthorpe

The Abbey, Ditcheat (formerly known as The Priory) is a large house at Ditcheat in Somerset. Originally a rectory, now converted into a house, the Grade II* listed building dates from the 15th century. To the rear of the Abbey is a Grade II listed granary.

== House ==
The Abbey was built as the rectory by John Gunthorpe who was rector of Ditcheat and Dean of Wells, in 1473. The house was altered in 1667 for Christopher Coward; and given a new facade and rearranged internally in 1864–68, probably by James Piers St Aubyn for Rev. William Leir.

The building is constructed of rubble stone, dressed with freestones. The roof is tiled with stone tiles, there are stone finials and grouped ashlar chimneystacks. Originally set out as a hall house, but changed later to form an L-shaped floorplan. The building is two storeys high, with four gables on the frontage, two smaller triangular ones and two larger ogee headed ones.

The exterior is now mostly his Victorian neo-Tudor; inside there are reused fragments and some original 15th- and 17th-century work – coffered ceilings and the arch-braced roof of the ‘chapel wing’, but most of the elaborate Gothic work dates from the 1860s. It was designated a Grade II* listed building on 2 June 1961.

== Granary ==
At the rear of the Abbey, there is a square 18th century granary, built round a timber-frame, with brick filled between the wood. The roof is pyramid shaped, tiled and ends in stone tiles. The granary was designated Grade II listed status on 25 February 1988.
