= Church of St Mary, Wanstrow =

Church in Somerset, England

Church of St Mary
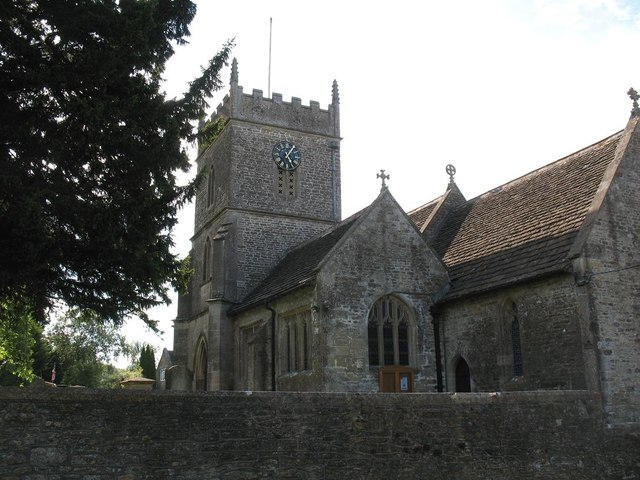

- Location within Somerset
- 51°10′24.600″N 2°24′59.184″W
- Location: Wanstrow, Somerset, England

History
- Built: 15th century

Listed Building – Grade II*
- Designated: 11 March 1968
- Reference no.: 1174955

The Anglican Church Of St Mary in Wanstrow, within the English county of Somerset, was built in the 15th century. It is a Grade II* listed building.

The church was extended and partially rebuilt in the 19th century. The three stage tower, which was added in 1810, is supported by corner buttresses.

The parish is part of the Postlebury benefice which includes the churches in Cloford, Marston Bigot, Nunney, Wanstrow and Witham Friary within the Diocese of Bath and Wells.
