= Church of All Saints, East Pennard =

Church in Somerset, England

Church of All Saints
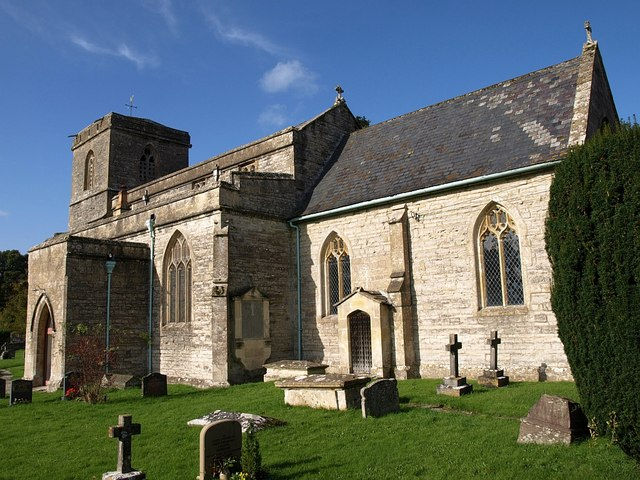

- Location within Somerset

General information
- Location: East Pennard, England
- Coordinates: 51.1350°N 2.5773°W
- Completed: 14th century

The Church of All Saints in East Pennard, Somerset, England, dates from the 14th century. It is a grade I listed building.

The tower contains a clock and five bells. They are the second heaviest peal of five bells in the world.

Inside the church is a Norman font and several stained-glass windows; there is also an altar screen and monuments of the Martines and Napiers.

The 15th-century churchyard cross was restored in 1919 as a memorial to those who died in World War I.

In 2011, fundraising was undertaken to raise the £60,000 needed to repair the roof.

The parish is part of the Fosse Trinity benefice within the deanery of Shepton Mallet.

== See also ==
- Grade I listed buildings in Mendip
- List of Somerset towers
- List of ecclesiastical parishes in the Diocese of Bath and Wells
