= East Pennard =

Village and civil parish in Somerset, England

Coordinates: 51.1352°N 2.5761°W

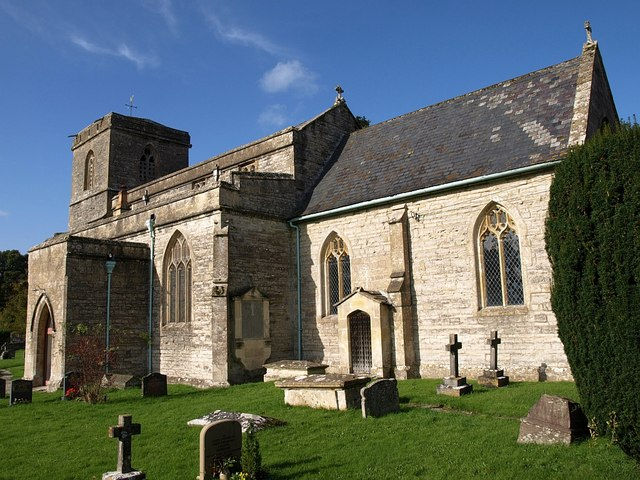
- All Saints church

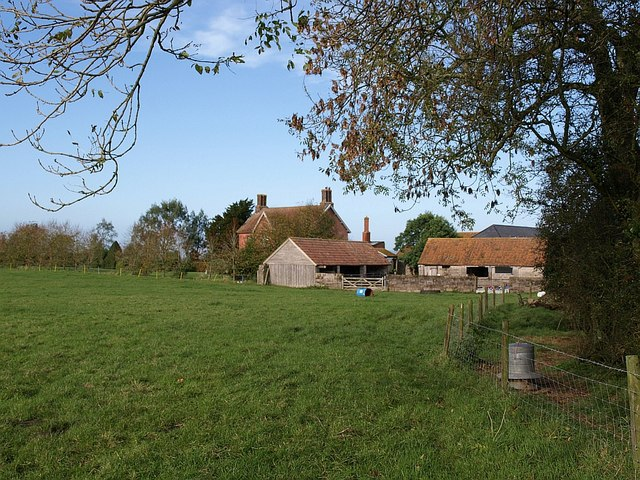
- Pennard Hill Farm

- Location within Somerset
- Population: 348 (2011)
- OS grid reference: ST595375
- Unitary authority: Somerset Council
- Ceremonial county: Somerset
- Region: South West
- Country: England
- Sovereign state: United Kingdom
- Post town: SHEPTON MALLET
- Postcode district: BA4
- Dialling code: 01749
- Police: Avon and Somerset
- Fire: Devon and Somerset
- Ambulance: South Western
- UK Parliament: Frome and East Somerset

East Pennard is a village and civil parish 4 miles (6.4 km) north west of Castle Cary, and 5 miles (8.0 km) south of Shepton Mallet, in the county of Somerset, England. It has a population of 348. The parish includes the hamlets of Stone, Parbrook and Huxham.

It is very close to the site of the Glastonbury Festival. Residents receive free tickets to the Festival.

== History ==
The village takes its name from the Brythonic family of Celtic languages: penn-ardd meaning high hill.

The estate was granted by King Edred to Aelfgyth, a nun of Wilton and she transferred it to Glastonbury Abbey which retained it until the Dissolution of the monasteries in 1539. It then given to William Paulet and eventually to his descendants the Napiers of Tintinhull.

Stone was part of the hundred of Carhampton, while East Pennard was part of the Whitstone Hundred.

== Governance ==
The parish council has responsibility for local issues, including setting an annual precept (local rate) to cover the council’s operating costs and producing annual accounts for public scrutiny. The parish council evaluates local planning applications and works with the local police, district council officers, and neighbourhood watch groups on matters of crime, security, and traffic. The parish council's role also includes initiating projects for the maintenance and repair of parish facilities, as well as consulting with the district council on the maintenance, repair, and improvement of highways, drainage, footpaths, public transport, and street cleaning. Conservation matters (including trees and listed buildings) and environmental issues are also the responsibility of the council.

For local government purposes, since 1 April 2023, the parish comes under the unitary authority of Somerset Council. Prior to this, it was part of the non-metropolitan district of Mendip (established under the Local Government Act 1972). It was part of Shepton Mallet Rural District before 1974.

It is also part of the Frome and East Somerset county constituency represented in the House of Commons of the Parliament of the United Kingdom. It elects one Member of Parliament (MP) by the first past the post system of election.

== Religious sites ==
The church, dedicated to All Saints, dates from the 14th century with a tower containing a clock and five bells. They are the second heaviest peal of five bells in the world. It contains a Norman font and several stained-glass windows, also an altar screen and monuments of the Martines and Napiers. It is a grade I listed building.

== Huxham ==
The hamlet of Huxham is just off the A37, south of Shepton Mallet. It is notable for the large area of common land at its centre (comprising two adjoining registered commons). This is one of the few areas of common land in this part of Somerset and is thought to have once been a holding area for cattle herds being driven to the markets at Lydford-on-Fosse and Glastonbury. There is a public right of Freedom to roam over the common land by virtue of the Countryside and Rights of Way Act 2000, and several public footpaths extend across the surrounding countryside. Huckeymead Lane, which crosses the common, ends at a bridleway that leads to the Monarch's Way. Local wildlife include roe deer, barn owls and (in the large pond on the common) greater-crested newts.

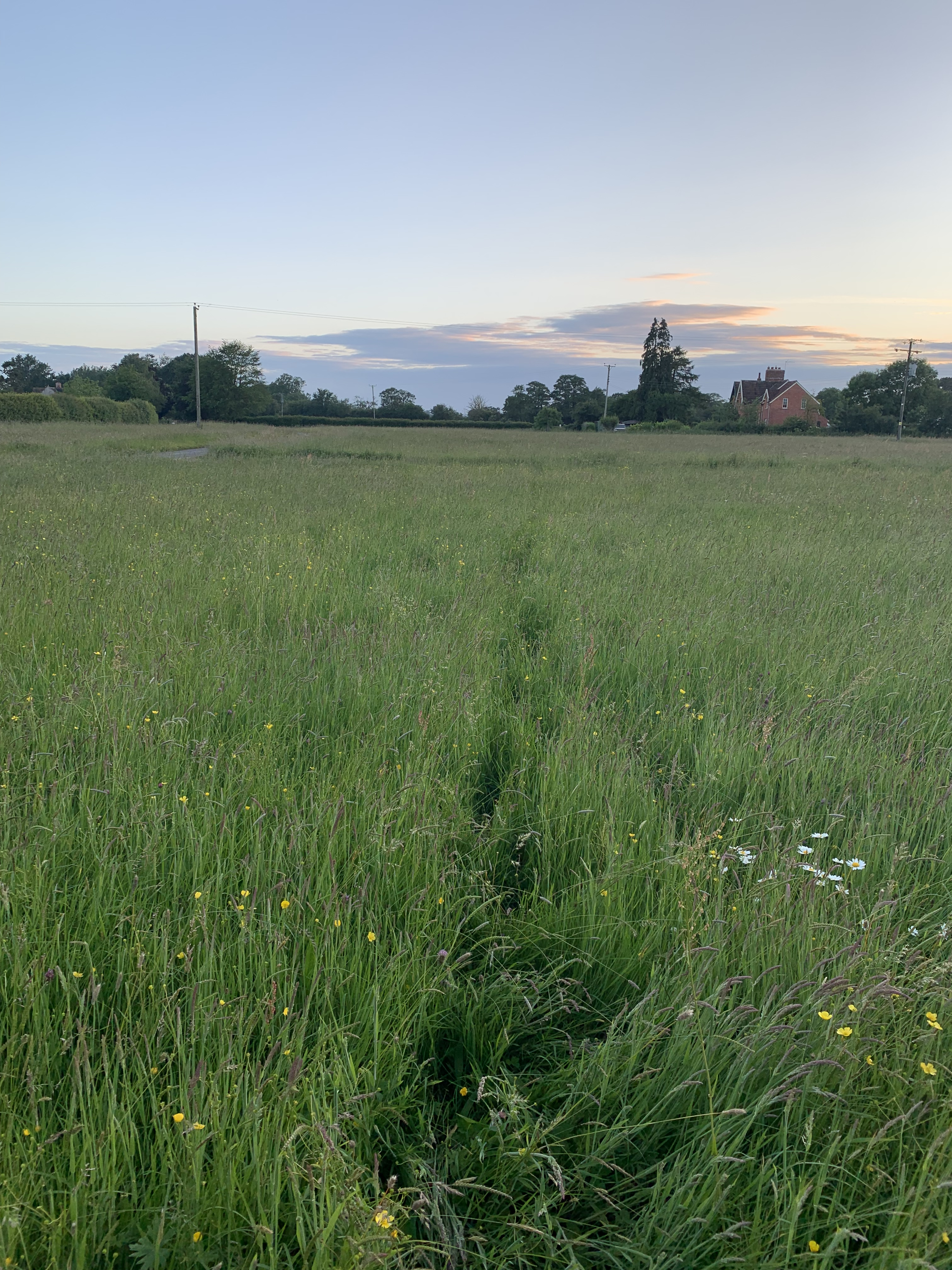
Midsummer view over the common land at Huxham Green

Huxham includes four farms which date back to the Middle Ages and were once owned by Glastonbury Abbey. After the Dissolution of the Monasteries the farms passed into private ownership and in the nineteenth century one of the farms was owned by Wadham College, of Oxford University. The southern edge of Huxham is marked by the Fosse Way (now the A37).

Other amenities in Huxham include a small airfield and a bed and breakfast establishment which is one of the closest accommodations to the Glastonbury Festival site. There are two vineyards nearby, a car repair business, a wedding venue and a local cheesemaker.

== Notable residents ==
The village was the birthplace, in 1869, of Tom Higdon who led the Burston Strike School.

- Thomas Crump (1845 — 1907) was an English cricketer who died in the village.
- Charles Napier (1817–1908), cricketer and clergyman
- Tristram Hillier RA, (1905-1983), English surrealist painter.
- Christy Brown (1932–1981), Irish writer and painter, lived in Parbrook.
