= Ditcheat =

Village in Somerset, England

Coordinates: 51.1264°N 2.5352°W

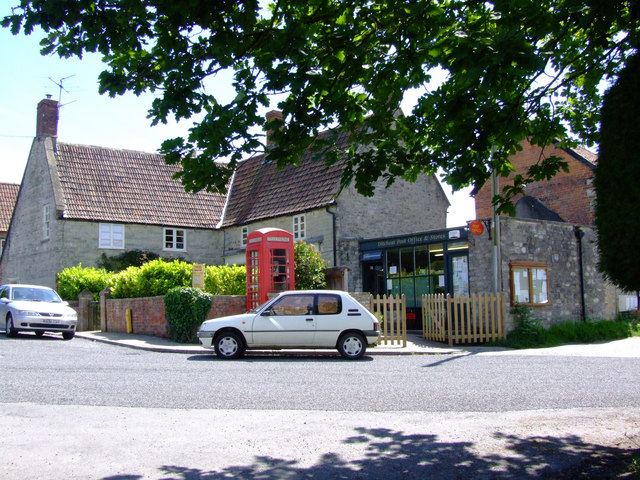
- Ditcheat post office (since closed)

- Location within Somerset
- Population: 725
- OS grid reference: ST625365
- Unitary authority: Somerset Council
- Ceremonial county: Somerset
- Region: South West
- Country: England
- Sovereign state: United Kingdom
- Post town: SHEPTON MALLET
- Postcode district: BA4
- Dialling code: 01749
- Police: Avon and Somerset
- Fire: Devon and Somerset
- Ambulance: South Western
- UK Parliament: Frome and East Somerset

Ditcheat is a village and civil parish 4.5 miles (7 km) south of Shepton Mallet, and 2.5 miles (4 km) north-west of Castle Cary, in Somerset, England. Besides the village, the parish has four hamlets: Wraxall, Lower Wraxall, Alhampton and Sutton.

== History ==
In the Domesday Book of 1086, Ditcheat belonged to Glastonbury Abbey and contained 36 families. The parish of Ditcheat was part of the Whitstone Hundred.

Nearby main roads are the A37, 1.5 miles (2 km) west of the village, connecting Bristol and Yeovil, and the A371, 1 mile (2 km) east, connecting Shepton Mallet and Wincanton. It lies near the River Brue which is crossed by Ansford bridge which dates from 1823. Boulter's Bridge which spans the River Alham is of medieval origin and has been designated as a Scheduled Ancient Monument. The parish is close to the Roman Fosse Way.

The Manor House is a 17th-century manor house built by Sir Ralph Hopton.

== Governance ==
The parish council has responsibility for local issues, including setting an annual precept (local rate) to cover the council’s operating costs and producing annual accounts for public scrutiny. The parish council evaluates local planning applications and works with the local police, district council officers, and neighbourhood watch groups on matters of crime, security, and traffic. The parish council's role also includes initiating projects for the maintenance and repair of parish facilities, as well as consulting with the district council on the maintenance, repair, and improvement of highways, drainage, footpaths, public transport, and street cleaning. Conservation matters (including trees and listed buildings) and environmental issues are also the responsibility of the council.

For local government purposes, since 1 April 2023, the village comes under the unitary authority of Somerset Council. Prior to this, it was part of the non-metropolitan district of Mendip, which was formed on 1 April 1974 under the Local Government Act 1972, having previously been part of Shepton Mallet Rural District.

It is also part of the Frome and East Somerset county constituency represented in the House of Commons of the Parliament of the United Kingdom. It elects one Member of Parliament (MP) by the first past the post system of election. It was part of the South West England constituency of the European Parliament prior to Britain leaving the European Union in January 2020, which elected seven MEPs using the d'Hondt method of party-list proportional representation.

== Religious sites ==
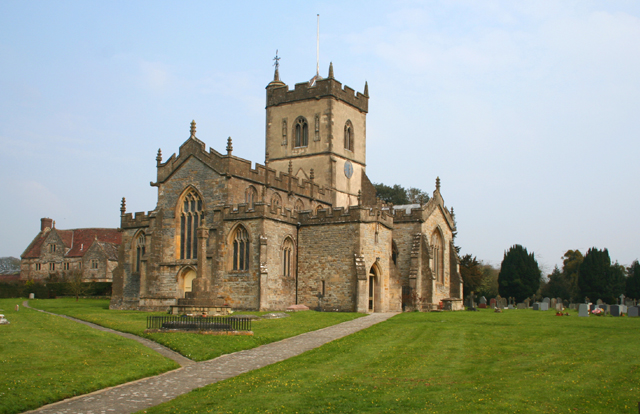
Church of St Mary Magdalene, Ditcheat

The Church of St Mary Magdalene has 12th-century origins. It has been designated by English Heritage as a Grade I listed building.

The Abbey is a large house (formerly known as The Priory), built as the rectory by John Gunthorpe who was rector of Ditcheat, Dean of Wells and Lord Privy Seal, in 1473. The house was altered in 1667 for Christopher Coward; and given a new facade and rearranged internally in 1864–68, probably by James Piers St Aubyn for Rev. William Leir. The exterior is now mostly his Victorian neo-Tudor; inside there are reused fragments and some original 15th- and 17th-century work – coffered ceilings and the arch-braced roof of the ‘chapel wing’ – but most of the elaborate Gothic work dates from the 1860s.

Priors Leigh on the Alhampton Road is a former chapel, now a private home.

Alhampton is served by Alhampton Chapel, a small mission church and tin tabernacle which was erected in 1892. Alhampton Chapel is under the auspices of St Mary Magdalene Church in Ditcheat, both of which form part of the Fosse Trinity Benefice.

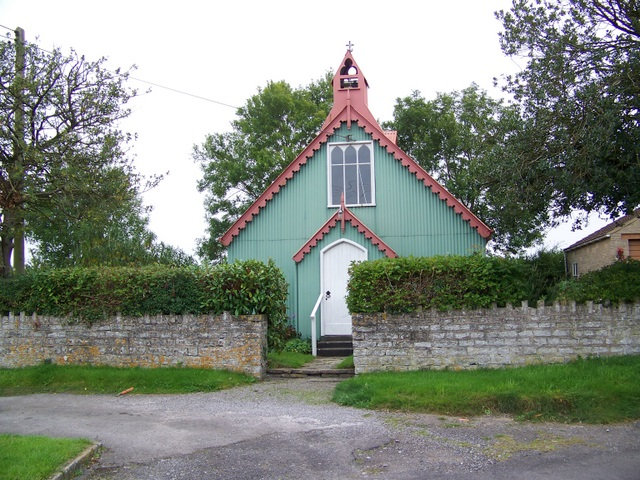
Alhampton Tabernacle

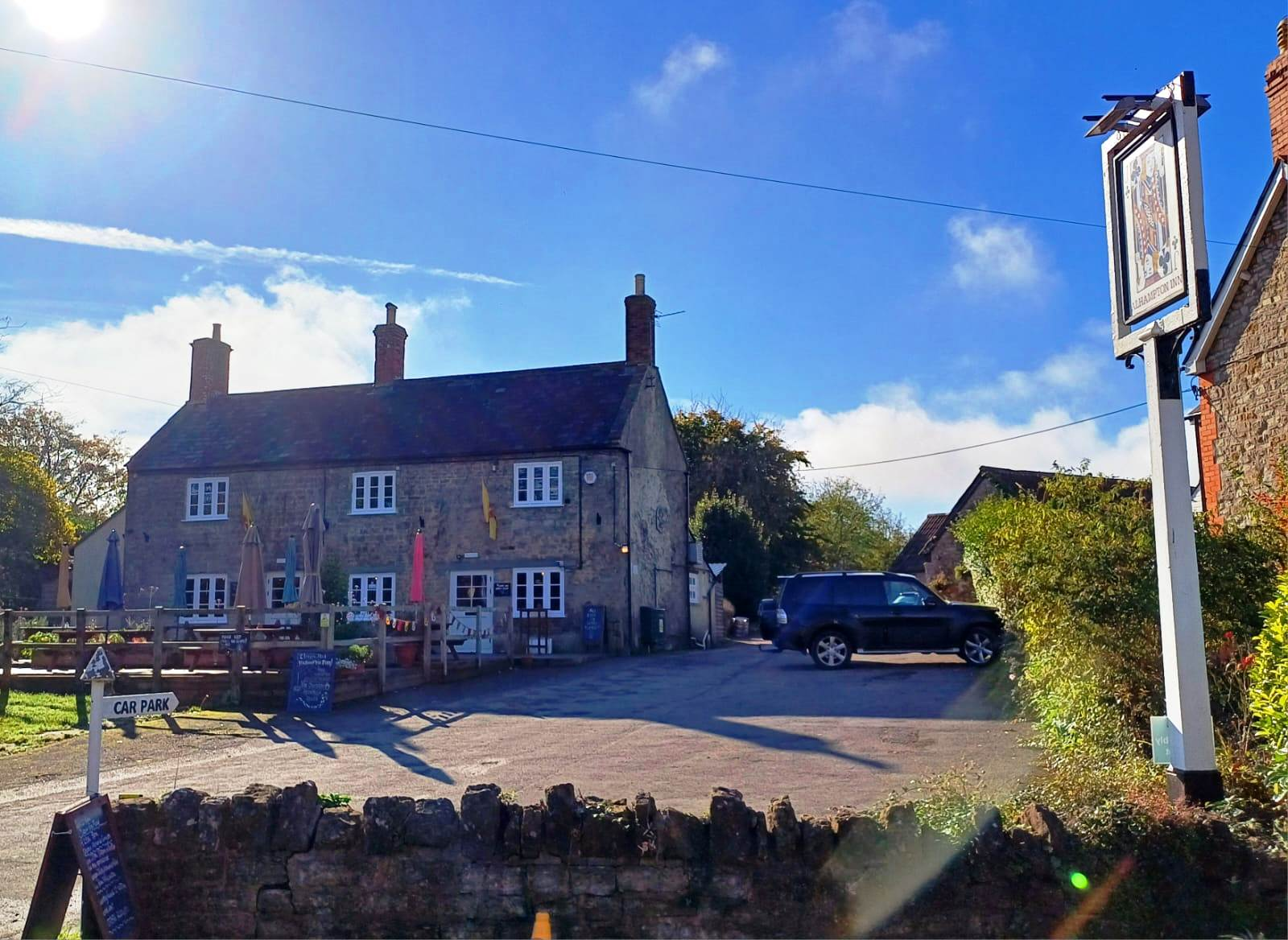
Alhampton Inn

== Community facilities ==
There is a public house in Ditcheat village, called The Manor House Inn, dating from the 17th century and which used to be owned by the lord of the manor.

The Alhampton Inn, also known as the Knave of Clubs, is claimed to have been an alehouse from at least the seventeenth century. After it closed in 2022, a community initiative supported by the Plunkett Foundation was set up to reopen the pub, and this was successfully achieved in August 2023. In 2024, the pub won a Prince of Wales Award of Honour, and was listed by the Daily Mail as one of the hundred best pubs in Britain.

A new woodland, Haddon Wood, was established at Alhampton on 28 acres of land donated by the owner in 2013 to the Woodland Trust for the benefit of the local community. The land has been planted with native and orchard trees, and has a pond.

== Sport ==
Ditcheat is home to the stables operated by Paul Nicholls, trainer of Cheltenham Gold Cup-winning horses Kauto Star and Denman.

== Notable people ==
- Theodosia Alleine (d. 1685), nonconformist writer
- William Alleine (1614–1677), minister
- Paul Barber (1942–2023), farmer, cheese manufacturer and racehorse owner
- Charles Dowding (b.1959), horticulturalist and local resident.
- Paul Nicholls (b.1962), horse racing trainer.
