= No-dig gardening =

Form of permaculture for growing food

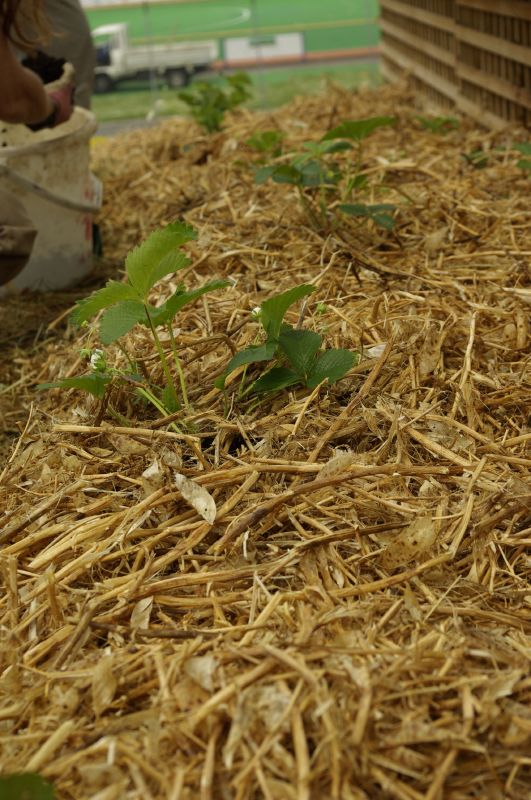
A no-dig garden in Dunedin, New Zealand.

No-dig gardening is a non-cultivation method used by some organic gardeners.

This technique recognizes that micro- and macro-biotic organisms constitute a "food web" community in the soil, necessary for the healthy cycling of nutrients and prevention of problematic organisms and diseases. The plants transfer a portion of the carbon energy they produce to the soil, and microbes that benefit from this energy in turn convert available organic substances in the soil to the mineral components the plants need to thrive.

== History ==
The origins of no-dig gardening are unclear, and may be based on pre-industrial or nineteenth-century farming techniques. Masanobu Fukuoka started his pioneering research work in this domain in 1938, and began publishing in the 1970s his Fukuokan philosophy of "do-nothing farming" or natural farming, which is now acknowledged by some as the tap root of the permaculture movement.

Two pioneers of the method in the twentieth century included F. C. King, Head Gardener at Levens Hall, South Westmorland, in the Lake District of England, who wrote the book "Is Digging Necessary?" in 1946, and a gardener from Middlecliffe in the UK, A. Guest, who in 1948 published the book "Gardening Without Digging". The work of these gardeners was supported by the Good Gardeners Association in the UK. No-dig gardening was also promoted by Australian Esther Deans in the 1970s, and American gardener Ruth Stout advocated a "permanent" garden mulching technique in Gardening Without Work and no-dig methods in the 1950s and 1960s.

== Purpose ==
Historically, the reasons for tilling the soil are to remove weeds, loosen and aerate the soil, and incorporate organic matter such as compost or manure into lower soil layers. In areas with thin soil and high erosion, there is a strong case against digging, which argues that in the long term it can be detrimental to the food web in the fragile topsoil.

While digging is an effective way of removing perennial weed roots, it also often causes seeds that can remain dormant for many decades to come to the surface and germinate. The act of aerating the soil also increases the rate of decomposition and reduces soil organic matter. Digging can also damage soil structure, causing compaction, and unbalance symbiotic and mutualist interactions among soil life. Digging tends to displace nutrients, shifting surface organic material deeper, where there is less oxygen to support the decomposition of plant-available nutrients, which then need to be otherwise replenished. Digging is practised traditionally in regions with old, deep, rich soils such as Western Europe, where digging was followed by periodic resting of the soil, usually with an undisturbed cover crop.

== Methods ==
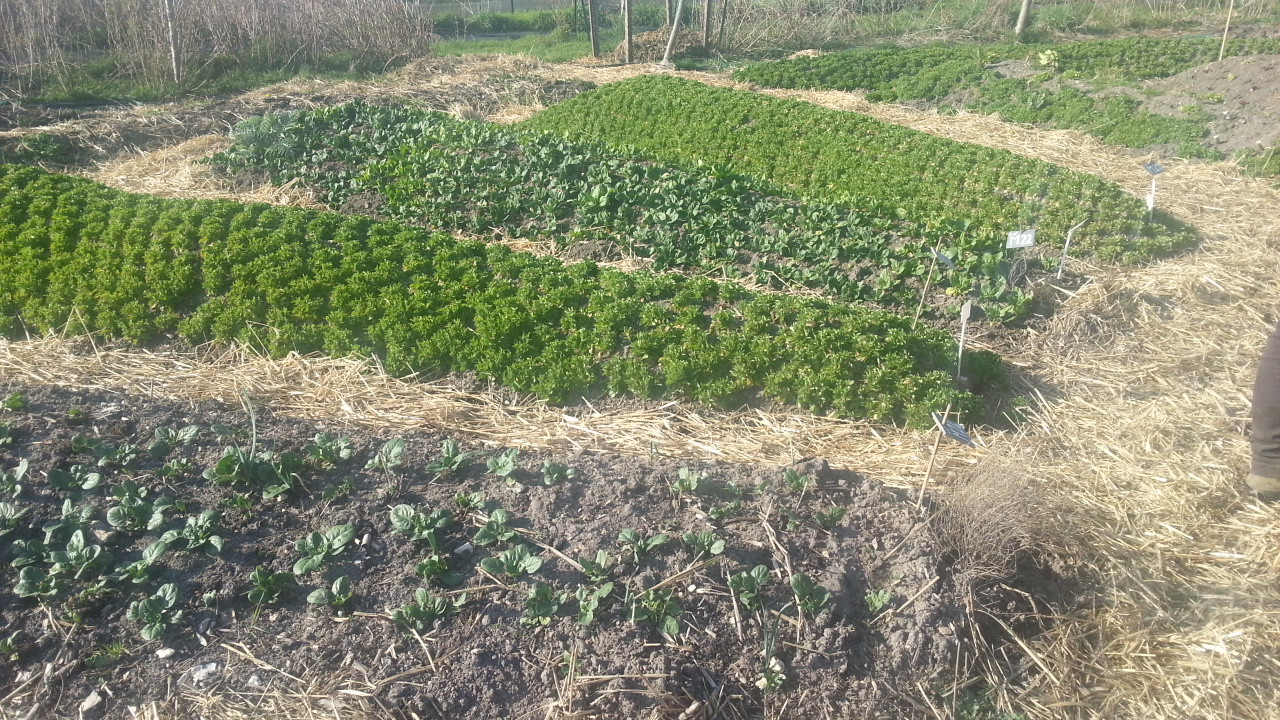

No-dig methods allow nature to carry out cultivation operations. Organic matter such as well rotted manure, compost, leaf mold, spent mushroom compost, old straw, etc., is added directly to the soil surface as a mulch at least 5-15 centimeters (2–6 in) deep, which is then incorporated by the actions of worms, insects and microbes. Worms and other soil life also assist in building up the soil's structure, their tunnels providing aeration and drainage, and their excretions bind together soil crumbs. This natural biosphere maintains healthy conditions in the upper soil horizons, where annual plant roots thrive. No-dig systems are said by practitioners such as Charles Dowding to be freer of pests and disease, possibly due to a more balanced soil population being allowed to build up in this undisturbed environment, and by encouraging the buildup of beneficial rather than harmful soil fungi. Moisture is also retained more efficiently under mulch than on the surface of bare earth, allowing slower percolation and less leaching of nutrients.

Another no-dig method is sheet mulching wherein a garden area is covered with wetted paper or cardboard, compost and topped off with landscape mulch. This technique is also called lasagna gardening.

A no-dig system is considered easier than digging. It is a long term process, and is reliant upon having plentiful organic matter to provide mulch material. It is also helpful to remove any perennial weed roots from the area beforehand, although their hold can be weakened by applying a light-excluding surface layer such as large sheets of cardboard or several thicknesses of spread out newspaper before adding the compost mulch. The newspaper or cardboard should be thoroughly wet to help it lie flat and keep it from blowing away until the overlying material is added.

== Practice ==
=== Australia ===
Esther Deans wrote the books No-Dig Gardening and Leaves of Life. She actively travelled to teach about this gardening method, cooking and promoting raised gardens for those with special needs. She also taught about the necessity to maintain excellent water quality. Deans continued gardening until the age of 95. Around this time, Harper Collins publishers held a special honorary event for her in their Ryde offices, as Esther had become Australia's most published author. As Deans grew older, she was assisted by Lucinda Bartram who helped her carry on the tradition of teaching no-dig gardening methods to others. Between the mid 1990s and 2009 Bartram, from Bondi and then Randwick, helped Deans reach the public and maintained the prolific 'no-dig' flowerbeds kept by Deans around her nursing apartment in the northern Sydney suburb of Waitara. The women shared many years co-teaching 'no-dig' gardening techniques to school children and freely sharing their knowledge together at garden fairs until 2009.

Esther Deans inspired many famous gardeners, including Bill Mollison of the permaculture movement, although she said "it is not quite how I would do it", implying she did not allow nature to take over, but retained formality with strict garden edges and more annuals.

Gardens fashioned on Esther Deans' no dig gardening principles include Randwick Community Organic Garden (RCOG), Sydney, New South Wales, Australia.

=== UK ===
Since 1982 Charles Dowding has been practising no dig in his market gardens, on areas ranging from a quarter to seven acres. He has written eleven books on gardening organically and without digging, and gives regular talks and courses on the subject. His methods centre on using compost as a mulch, rather than unrotted organic matter which tends to accumulate slugs in the damp, British climate. He encourages gardeners to be adaptable in their approach, according to local soil, conditions and crops grown. His own speciality is salad leaves for sale to local outlets and the plants grow well in undisturbed soil.

== See also ==
- Aquaponics
- Broadfork: A tool to aerate the soil without overturning
- No-till farming
- Vegan organic gardening (Veganic gardening)
