= Permaculture =

Approach to agriculture and land management

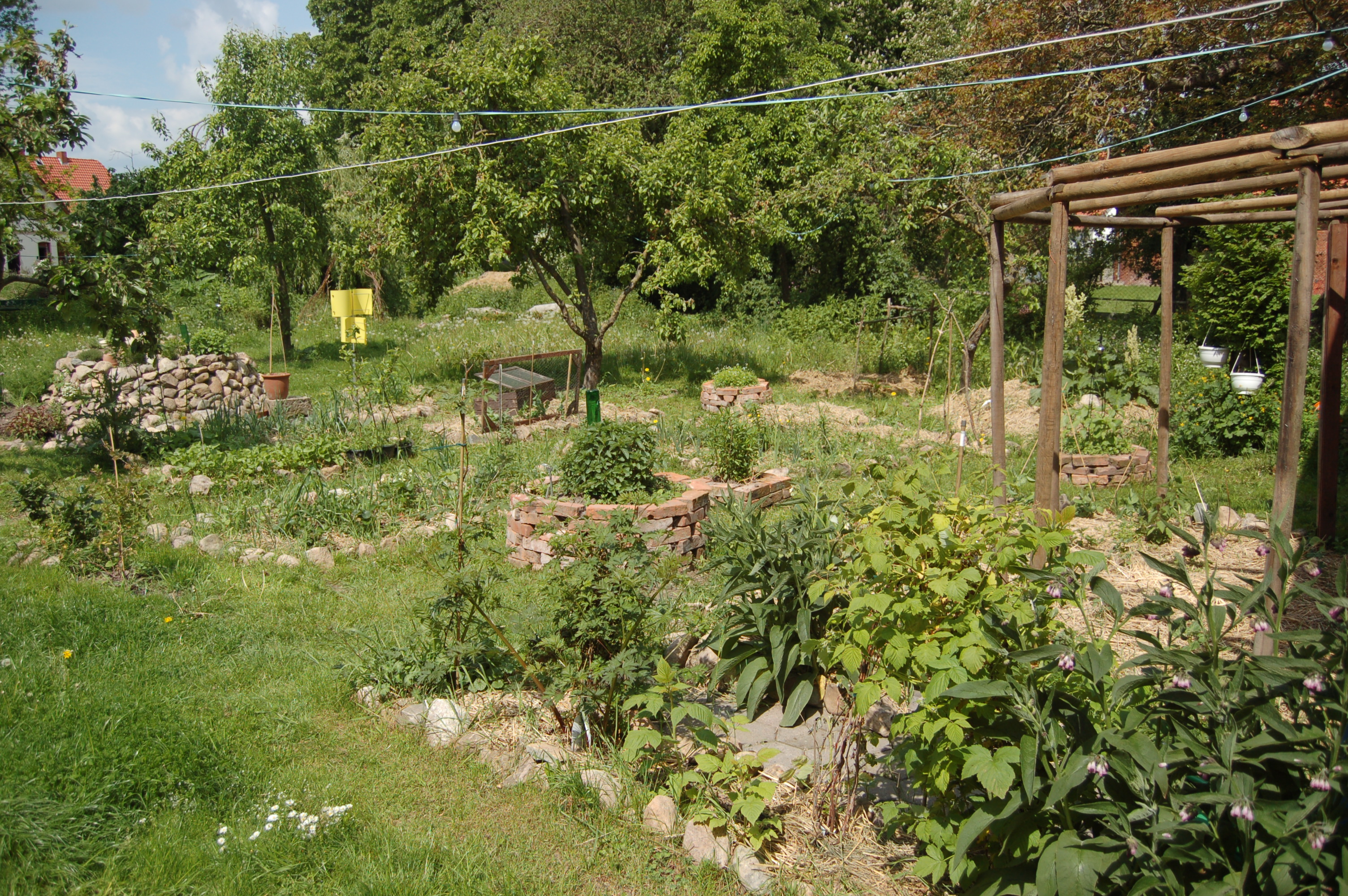
A garden cultivated on permaculture principles

Permaculture is an approach to land management and settlement design that adopts arrangements observed in flourishing natural ecosystems. It includes a set of design principles derived using whole-systems thinking. It applies these principles in fields such as regenerative agriculture, town planning, rewilding, and community resilience. The term was coined in 1978 by Bill Mollison and David Holmgren, who formulated the concept in opposition to modern industrialized methods, instead adopting a more traditional or "natural" approach to agriculture.

Multiple thinkers in the early and mid-20th century explored no-dig gardening, no-till farming, and the concept of "permanent agriculture", which were early inspirations for the field of permaculture. Mollison and Holmgren's work from the 1970s and 1980s led to several books, starting with Permaculture One in 1978, and to the development of the "Permaculture Design Course" which has been one of the main methods of diffusion of permacultural ideas. Starting from a focus on land usage in Southern Australia, permaculture has since spread in scope to include other regions and other topics, such as appropriate technology and intentional community design.

Several concepts and practices unify the wide array of approaches labelled as permaculture. Mollison and Holmgren's three foundational ethics and Holmgren's twelve design principles are often cited and restated in permaculture literature. Practices such as companion planting, extensive use of perennial crops, and designs such as the herb spiral have been used extensively by permaculturists.

Permaculture as a popular movement has been largely isolated from scientific literature, and has been criticised for a lack of clear definition or rigorous methodology. Despite a long divide, some 21st-century studies have supported the claims that permaculture improves soil quality and biodiversity, and have identified it as a social movement capable of promoting agroecological transition away from conventional agriculture.

== Background ==
=== History ===
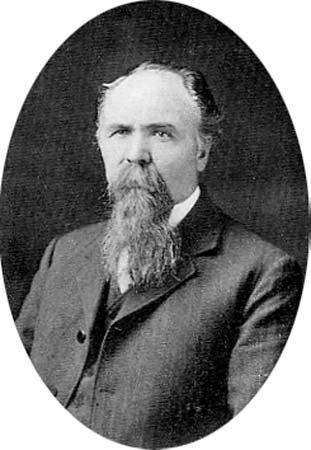
Franklin Hiram King introduced the term "permanent agriculture" in 1911.

In 1911, Franklin Hiram King wrote Farmers of Forty Centuries: Or Permanent Agriculture in China, Korea and Japan, describing farming practices of East Asia designed for "permanent agriculture". (Note: King 1911, p. Title page) In 1929, Joseph Russell Smith appended King's term as the subtitle for Tree Crops: A Permanent Agriculture, which he wrote in response to widespread deforestation, plow agriculture, and erosion in the eastern mountains and hill regions of the United States. He proposed the planting of tree fruits and nuts as human and animal food crops that could stabilize watersheds and restore soil health. Smith saw the world as an inter-related whole and suggested mixed systems of trees with understory crops. This book inspired individuals such as Toyohiko Kagawa who pioneered forest farming in Japan in the 1930s. Another pioneer, George Washington Carver, advocated for practices now common in permaculture, including the use of crop rotation to restore nitrogen to the soil and repair damaged farmland, in his work at the Tuskegee Institute between 1896 and his death in 1947.

In his 1964 book Water for Every Farm, the Australian agronomist and engineer P. A. Yeomans advanced a definition of permanent agriculture as one that can be sustained indefinitely. Yeomans introduced both an observation-based approach to land use in Australia in the 1940s and in the 1950s the Keyline design as a way of managing the supply and distribution of water in semi-arid regions. Other early influences include Stewart Brand's works, Ruth Stout and Esther Deans, who pioneered no-dig gardening, and Masanobu Fukuoka who, in the late 1930s in Japan, began advocating no-till orchards and gardens and natural farming.

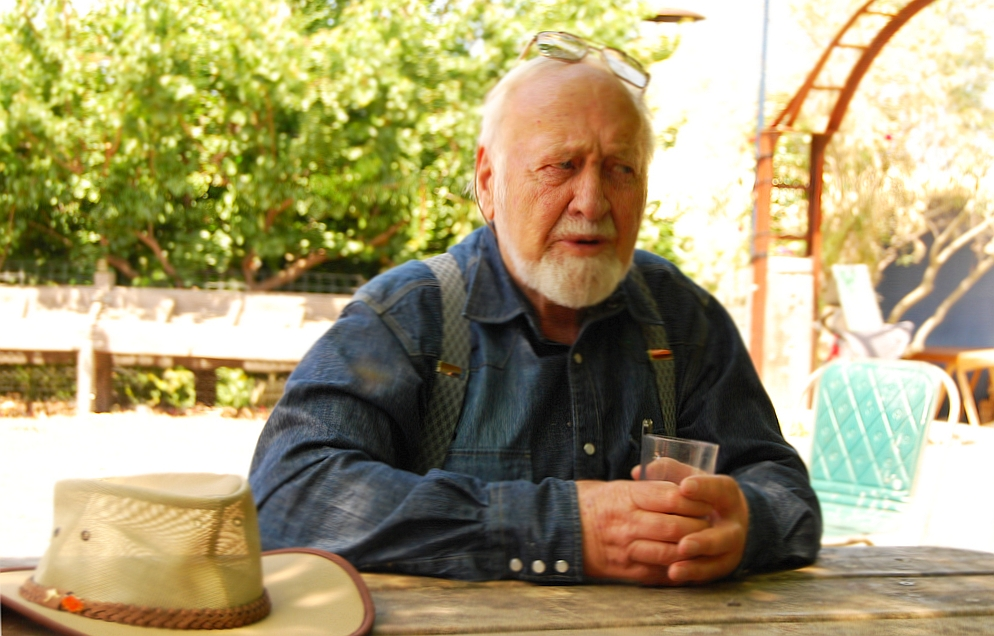
Bill Mollison, who has been described as the "father of permaculture", cites Aboriginal Tasmanian belief systems as an inspiration of the practice.

In the late 1960s, Bill Mollison, senior lecturer in Environmental Psychology at University of Tasmania, and David Holmgren, graduate student at the then Tasmanian College of Advanced Education started developing ideas about stable agricultural systems on the southern Australian island of Tasmania. Their recognition of the unsustainable nature of modern industrialized methods and their inspiration from Tasmanian Aboriginal and other traditional practises were critical to their formulation of permaculture. In their view, industrialized methods were highly dependent on non-renewable resources, and were additionally poisoning land and water, reducing biodiversity, and removing billions of tons of topsoil from previously fertile landscapes. They responded with permaculture. This term was first made public with the publication of their 1978 book Permaculture One.

Permaculture is a philosophy of working with, rather than against nature; of protracted and thoughtful observation rather than protracted and thoughtless labor; and of looking at plants and animals in all their functions, rather than treating any area as a single product system.

— Bill Mollison

Following the publication of Permaculture One, Mollison responded to widespread enthusiasm for the work by traveling and teaching a three-week program that became known as the Permaculture Design Course. It addressed the application of permaculture design to growing in major climatic and soil conditions, to the use of renewable energy and natural building methods, and to "invisible structures" of human society. He found ready audiences in Australia, New Zealand, the USA, Britain, and Europe, and from 1985 also reached the Indian subcontinent and southern Africa. By the early 1980s, the concept had broadened from agricultural systems towards sustainable human habitats and at the 1st Intl. Permaculture Convergence, a gathering of graduates of the PDC held in Australia, the curriculum was formalized and its format shortened to two weeks. After Permaculture One, Mollison further refined and developed the ideas while designing hundreds of properties. This led to the 1988 publication of his global reference work, Permaculture: A Designers Manual. Mollison encouraged graduates to become teachers and set up their own institutes and demonstration sites. Critics suggest that this success weakened permaculture's social aspirations of moving away from industrial social forms. They argue that the self-help model (akin to franchising) has had the effect of creating market-focused social relationships that the originators initially opposed.

=== Foundational ethics ===
The ethics on which permaculture builds are:

1. "Care of the Earth: Provision for all life systems to continue and multiply".
2. "Care of people: Provision for people to access those resources necessary for their existence".
3. "Setting limits to population and consumption: By governing our own needs, we can set resources aside to further the above principles".

Mollison's 1988 formulation of the third ethic was restated by Holmgren in 2002 as "Set limits to consumption and reproduction, and redistribute surplus" and is elsewhere condensed to "share the surplus".

Permaculture emphasizes patterns of landscape, function, and species assemblies. It determines where these elements should be placed so they can provide maximum benefit to the local environment. Permaculture maximizes synergy of the final design. The focus of permaculture, therefore, is not on individual elements, but rather on the relationships among them. The aim is for the whole to become greater than the sum of its parts, minimizing waste, human labour, and energy input, and to and maximize benefits through synergy.

Permaculture design is founded in replicating or imitating natural patterns found in ecosystems because these solutions have emerged through evolution over thousands of years and have proven to be effective. As a result, the implementation of permaculture design will vary widely depending on the region of the Earth it is located in. Because permaculture's implementation is so localized and place specific, scientific literature for the field is lacking or not always applicable. Design principles derive from the science of systems ecology and the study of pre-industrial examples of sustainable land use.

== Theory ==
=== Design principles ===
Holmgren articulated twelve permaculture design principles in his Permaculture: Principles and Pathways Beyond Sustainability:

- Observe and interact: Take time to engage with nature to design solutions that suit a particular situation.
- Catch and store energy: Develop systems that collect resources at peak abundance for use in times of need.
- Obtain a yield: Emphasize projects that generate meaningful rewards.
- Apply self-regulation and accept feedback: Discourage inappropriate activity to ensure that systems function well.
- Use and value renewable resources and services: Make the best use of nature's abundance: reduce consumption and dependence on non-renewable resources.
- Produce no waste: Value and employ all available resources: waste nothing.
- Design from patterns to details: Observe patterns in nature and society and use them to inform designs, later adding details.
- Integrate rather than segregate: Proper designs allow relationships to develop between design elements, allowing them to work together to support each other.
- Use small and slow solutions: Small and slow systems are easier to maintain, make better use of local resources, and produce more sustainable outcomes.
- Use and value diversity: Diversity reduces system-level vulnerability to threats and fully exploits its environment.
- Use edges and value the marginal: The border between things is where the most interesting events take place. These are often the system's most valuable, diverse, and productive elements.
- Creatively use and respond to change: A positive impact on inevitable change comes from careful observation, followed by well-timed intervention.

=== Guilds ===
Mycorrhizal fungi usually function in a mutualistic symbiotic relationship with plants.

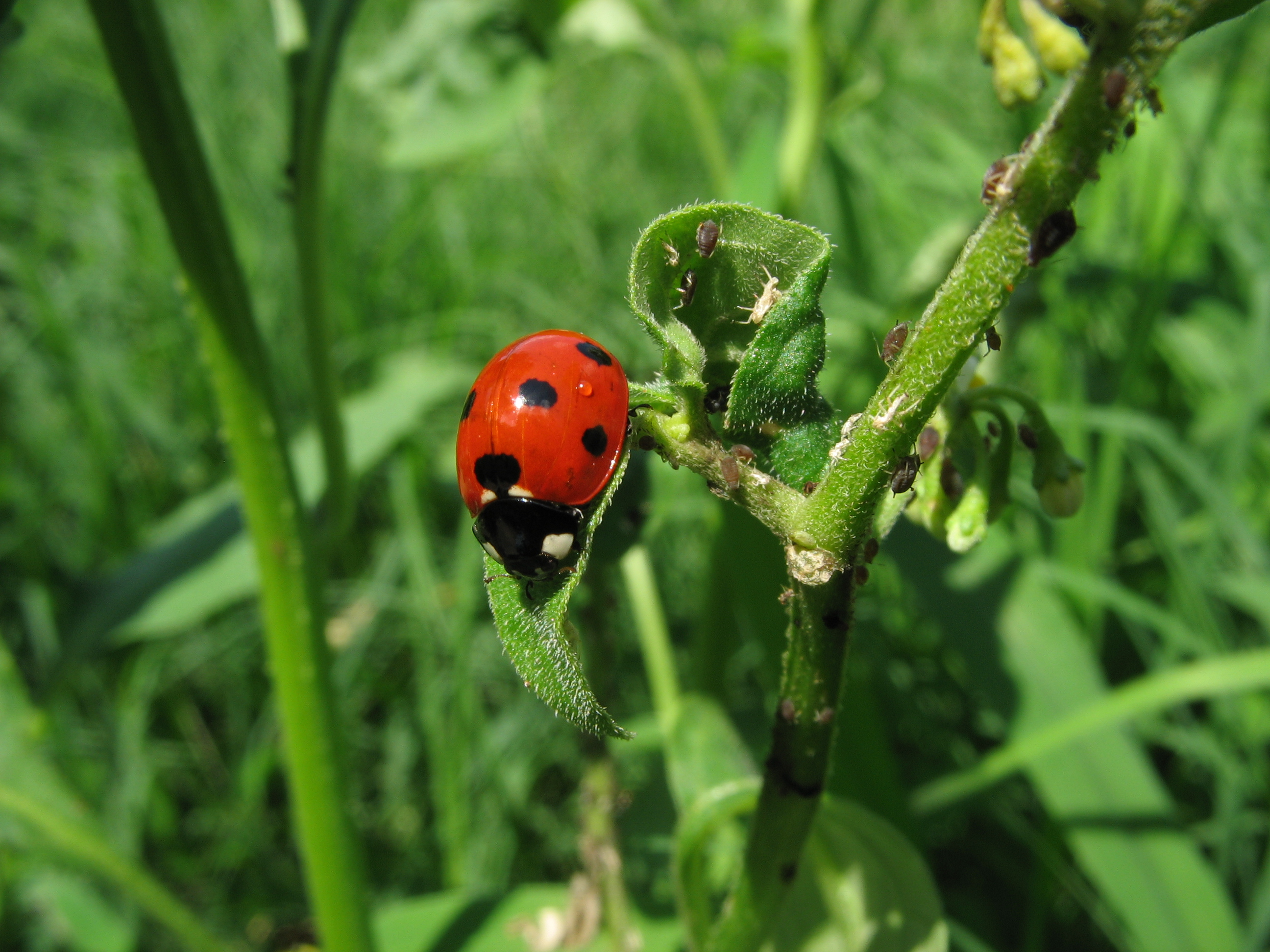
Ladybugs are seen as beneficial insects in permaculture because of their help with aphid control.

A guild is a mutually beneficial group of species that form a part of the larger ecosystem. Within a guild each species of insect or plant provides a unique set of diverse services that work in harmony. Plants may be grown for food production, drawing nutrients from deep in the soil through tap roots, balancing nitrogen levels in the soil (legumes), for attracting beneficial insects to the garden, and repelling undesirable insects or pests. There are several types of guilds, such as community function guilds, mutual support guilds, and resource partitioning guilds.

- Community function guilds group species based on a specific function or niche that they fill in the garden. Examples of this type of guild include plants that attract a particular beneficial insect or plants that restore nitrogen to the soil. These types of guilds are aimed at solving specific problems which may arise in a garden, such as infestations of harmful insects and poor nutrition in the soil.
- Establishment guilds are commonly used when working to establish target species (the primary vegetables, fruits, herbs, etc. you want to be established in your garden) with the support of pioneer species (plants that will help the target species succeed). For example, in temperate climates, plants such as comfrey (as a weed barrier and dynamic accumulator), lupine (as a nitrogen fixer), and daffodil (as a gopher deterrent) can together form a guild for a fruit tree. As the tree matures, the support plants will likely eventually be shaded out and can be used as compost.
- Mature guilds form once your target species are established. For example, if the tree layer of your landscape closes its canopy, sun-loving support plants will be shaded out and die. Shade loving medicinal herbs such as ginseng, Black Cohosh, and goldenseal can be planted as an understory.
- Mutual support guilds group species together that are complementary by working together and supporting each other. This guild may include a plant that fixes nitrogen, a plant that hosts insects that are predators to pests, and another plant that attracts pollinators.
- Resource partitioning guilds group species based on their abilities to share essential resources with one another through a process of niche differentiation. An example of this type of guild includes placing a fibrous- or shallow-rooted plant next to a tap-rooted plant so that they draw from different levels of soil nutrients.

=== Zones ===
Permaculture zones 0-5

Zones intelligently organize design elements in a human environment based on the frequency of human use and plant or animal needs. Frequently manipulated or harvested elements of the design are located close to the house in zones 1 and 2. Manipulated elements located further away are used less frequently. Zones are numbered from 0 to 5 based on positioning.

Zone 0
The house, or home center. Here permaculture principles aim to reduce energy and water needs harnessing natural resources such as sunlight, to create a harmonious, sustainable environment in which to live and work. Zone 0 is an informal designation, not specifically defined in Mollison's book.
Zone 1
The zone nearest to the house, the location for those elements in the system that require frequent attention, or that need to be visited often, such as salad crops, herb plants, soft fruit like strawberries or raspberries, greenhouse and cold frames, propagation area, worm compost bin for kitchen waste, etc. Raised beds are often used in Zone 1 in urban areas.
Zone 2
This area is used for siting perennial plants that require less frequent maintenance, such as occasional weed control or pruning, including currant bushes and orchards, pumpkins, sweet potato, etc. Also, a good place for beehives, larger-scale composting bins, etc.
Zone 3
The area where main crops are grown, both for domestic use and for trade purposes. After establishment, care and maintenance required are fairly minimal (provided mulches and similar things are used), such as watering or weed control maybe once a week.
Zone 4
A semi-wild area, mainly used for forage and collecting wild plants as well as production of timber for construction or firewood.
Zone 5
A wilderness area. Humans do not intervene in zone 5 apart from observing natural ecosystems and cycles. This zone hosts a natural reserve of bacteria, molds, and insects that can aid the zones above it.

=== Edge effect ===
The edge effect in ecology is the increased diversity that results when two habitats meet. Permaculturists argue that these places can be highly productive. An example of this is a coast. Where land and sea meet is a rich area that meets a disproportionate percentage of human and animal needs. This idea is reflected in permacultural designs by using spirals in herb gardens, or creating ponds that have wavy undulating shorelines rather than a simple circle or oval (thereby increasing the amount of edge for a given area). On the other hand, in a keyhole bed, edges are minimized to avoid wasting space and effort.

== Common practices ==
=== Hügelkultur ===
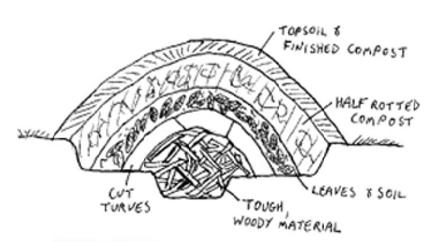
Sketch of a Hügelkultur bed

Hügelkultur is the practice of burying wood to increase soil water retention. The porous structure of wood acts like a sponge when decomposing underground. During the rainy season, sufficient buried wood can absorb enough water to sustain crops through the dry season. This technique is a traditional practice that has been developed over centuries in Europe and has been recently adopted by permaculturalists. The Hügelkultur technique can be implemented through building mounds on the ground as well as in raised garden beds. In raised beds, the practice "imitates natural nutrient cycling found in wood decomposition and the high water-holding capacities of organic detritus, while also improving bed structure and drainage properties." This is done by placing wood material (e.g. logs and sticks) in the bottom of the bed before piling organic soil and compost on top. A study comparing the water retention capacities of Hügel raised beds to non-Hügel beds determined that Hügel beds are both lower maintenance and more efficient in the long term by requiring less irrigation.

=== Sheet mulching ===
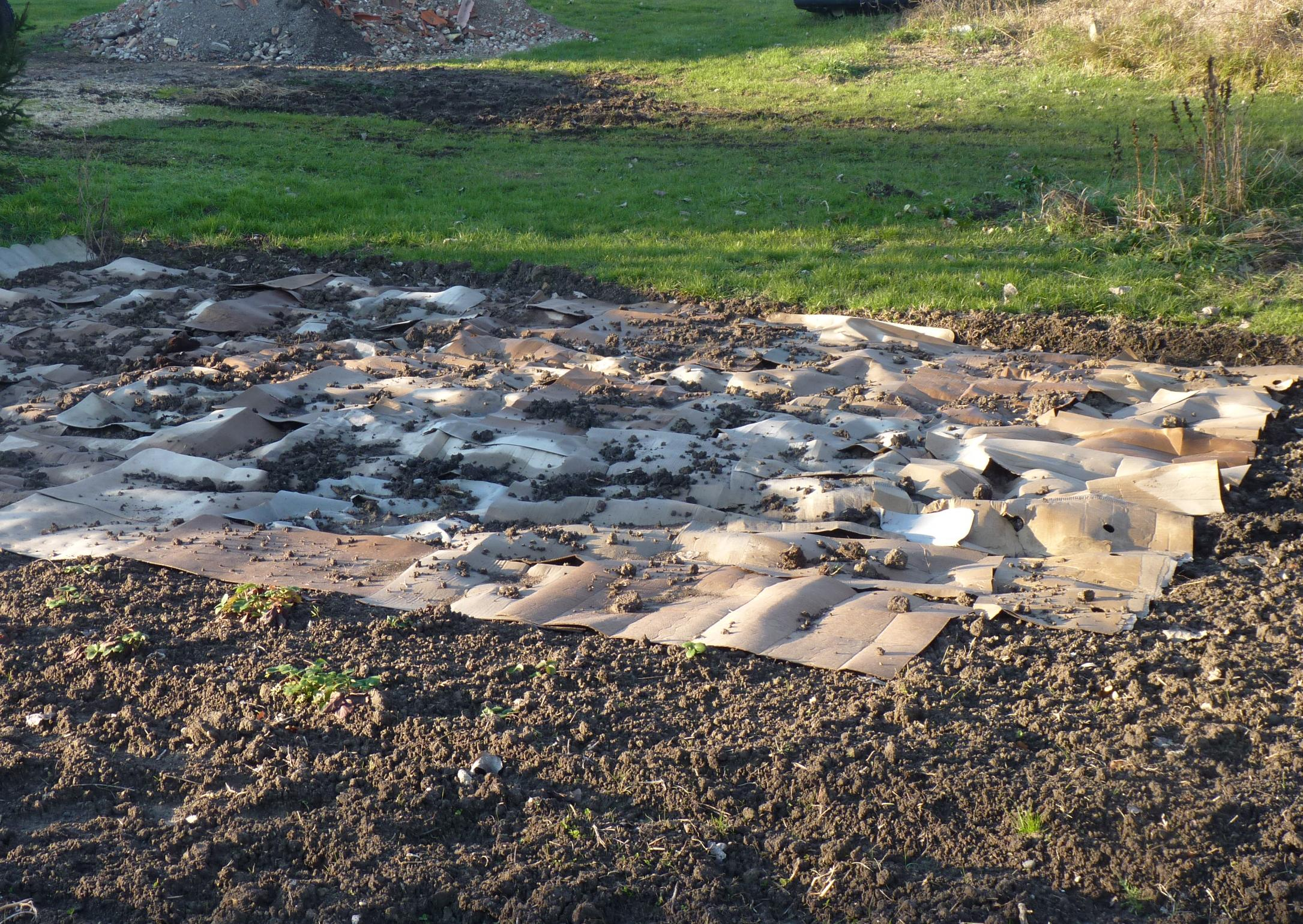
Preparation of a sheet mulch

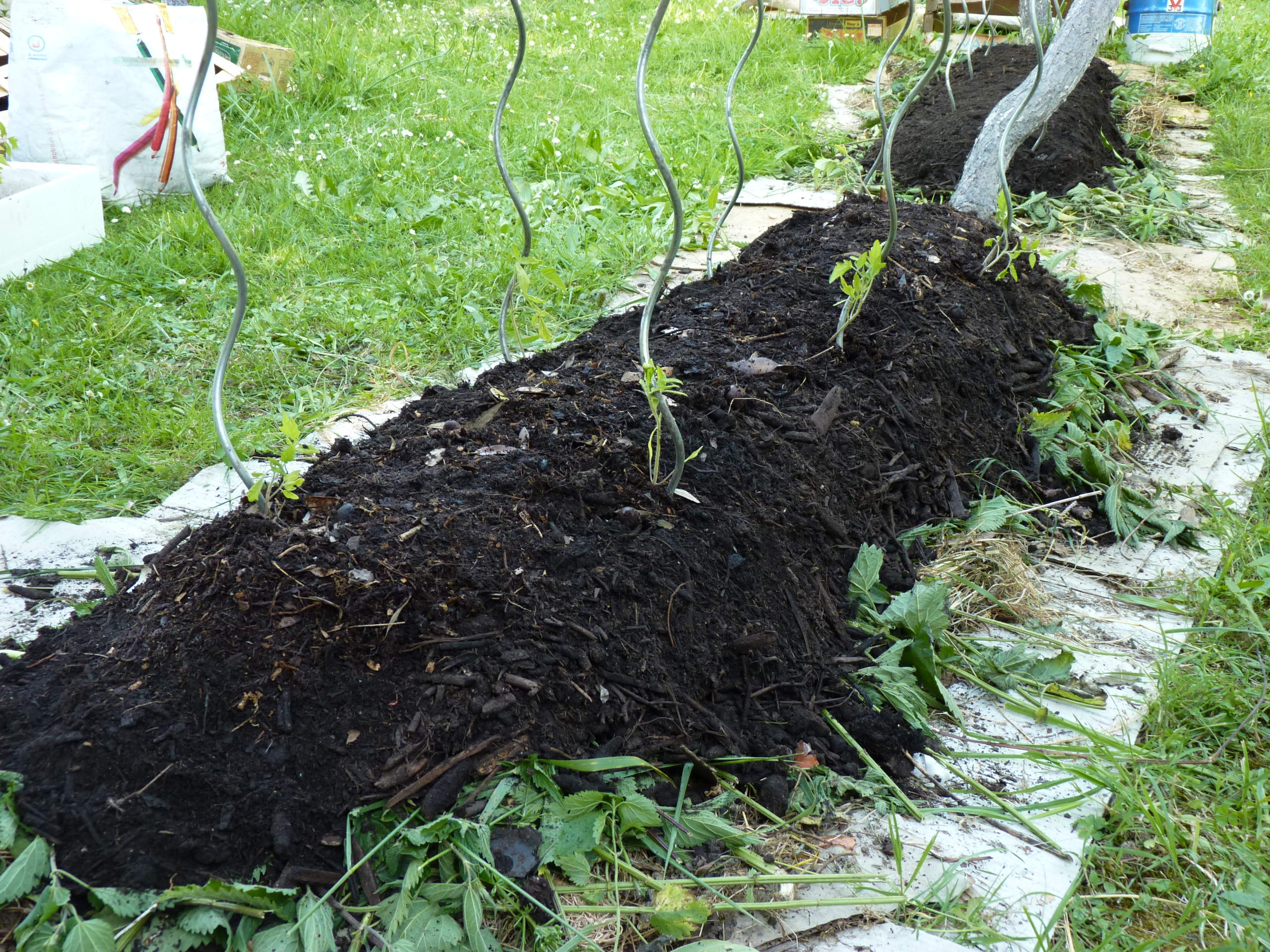
Tomato plants growing on a "lasagna" or sheet mulch

Mulch is a protective cover placed over soil. Mulch material includes leaves, cardboard, and wood chips. These absorb rain, reduce evaporation, provide nutrients, increase soil organic matter, create habitat for soil organisms, suppress weed growth and seed germination, moderate diurnal temperature swings, protect against frost, and reduce erosion. Sheet mulching or lasagna gardening is a gardening technique that attempts to mimic the leaf cover that is found on forest floors.

=== No-till gardening ===
Edward Faulkner's 1943 book Plowman's Folly, King's 1946 pamphlet "Is Digging Necessary?", A. Guest's 1948 book "Gardening without Digging", and Fukuoka's "Do Nothing Farming" all advocated forms of no-till or no-dig gardening. No-till gardening seeks to minimise disturbance to the soil community so as to maintain soil structure and organic matter.

=== Cropping practices ===
Low-effort permaculture favours perennial crops which do not require tilling and planting every year. Annual crops inevitably require more cultivation. They can be incorporated into permaculture by using traditional techniques such as crop rotation, intercropping, and companion planting so that pests and weeds of individual annual crop species do not build up, and minerals used by specific crop plants do not become successively depleted.

Companion planting aims to make use of beneficial interactions between species of cultivated plants. Such interactions include pest control, pollination, providing habitat for beneficial insects, and maximizing use of space; all of these may help to increase productivity.

=== Rainwater harvesting ===
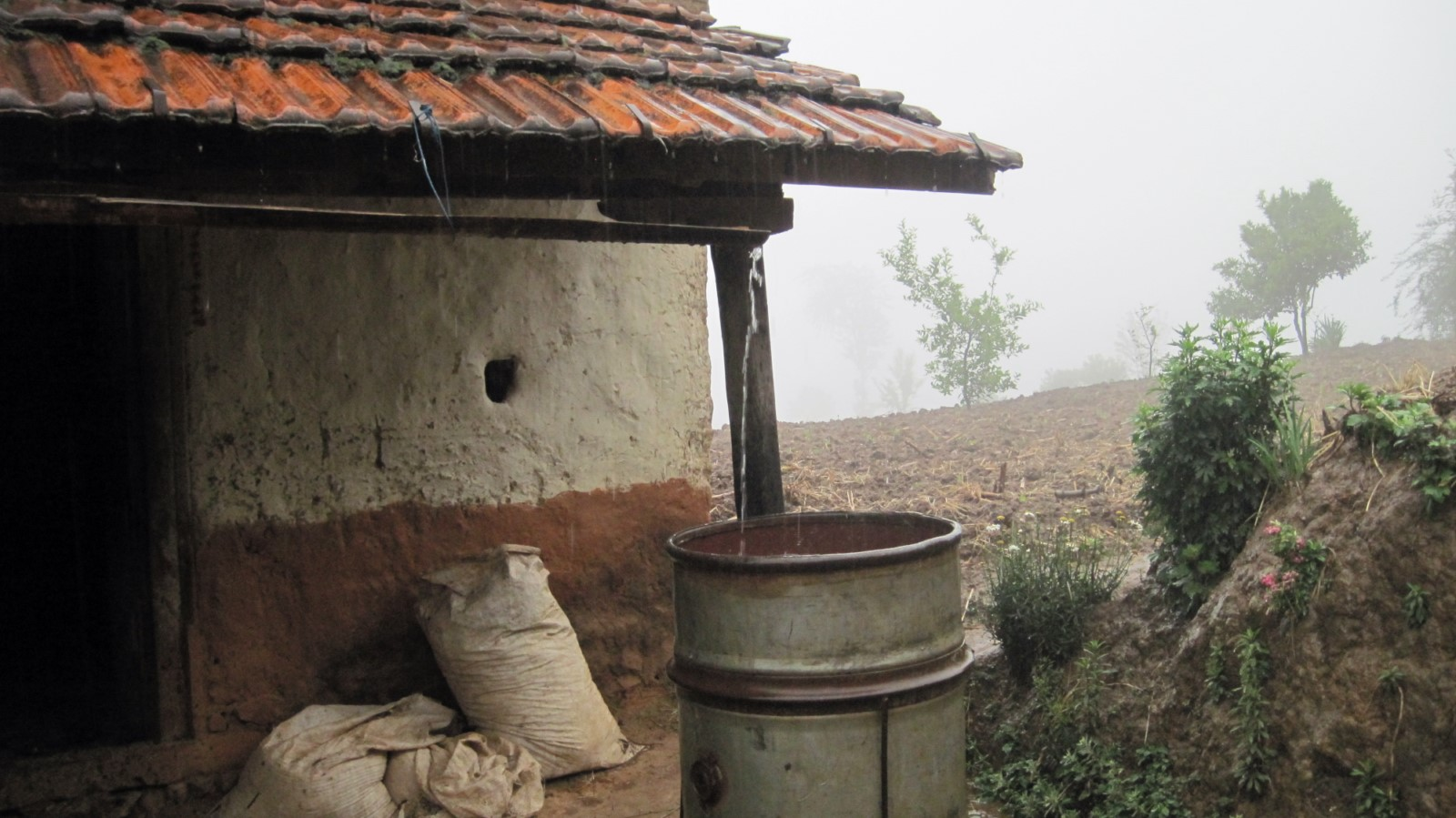
Rainwater collection is a common practice of permaculture.

Rainwater harvesting is the accumulation and storage of rainwater for reuse before it runs off or reaches the aquifer. It has been used to provide drinking water, water for livestock, and water for irrigation, as well as other typical uses. Rainwater collected from the roofs of houses and local institutions can make an important contribution to the availability of drinking water. It can supplement the water table and increase urban greenery. Water collected from the ground, sometimes from areas which are specially prepared for this purpose, is called stormwater harvesting.

Keyline design is a technique for maximizing the beneficial use of water resources. It was developed in Australia by farmer and engineer P. A. Yeomans. Keyline refers to a contour line extending in both directions from a keypoint. Plowing above and below the keyline provides a watercourse that directs water away from a purely downhill course to reduce erosion and encourage infiltration.

=== Compost production ===
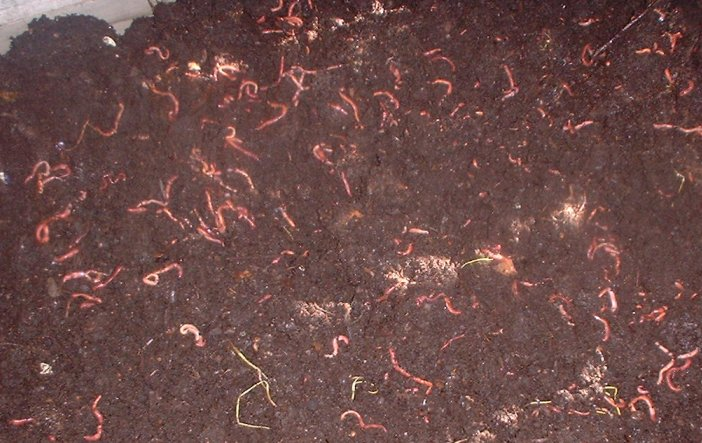
Healthy population of red wigglers in a vermicomposting bin

Vermicomposting is a common practice in permaculture. The practice involves using earthworms, such as red wigglers, to break down green and brown waste. The worms produce worm castings, which can be used to organically fertilize the garden. Worms are also introduced to garden beds, helping to aerate the soil and improve water retention. Worms may multiply quickly if provided conditions are ideal. For example, a permaculture farm in Cuba began with 9 tiger worms in 2001 and 15 years later had a population of over 500,000. The worm castings are particularly useful as part of a seed starting mix and regular fertilizer. Worm castings are reportedly more successful than conventional compost for seed starting.

Sewage or blackwater contains human or animal waste. It can be composted, producing biogas and manure. Human waste can be sourced from a composting toilet, outhouse or dry bog (rather than a plumbed toilet).

=== Fruit trees ===
Masanobu Fukuoka experimented with no-pruning methods on his family farm in Japan, finding that trees which were never pruned could grow well, whereas previously-pruned trees often died when allowed to grow without further pruning. He felt that this reflected the Tao-philosophy of Wú wéi, meaning no action against nature or "do-nothing" farming. He claimed yields comparable to intensive arboriculture with pruning and chemical fertilisation.

== Applications ==
=== Suburban and urban ===
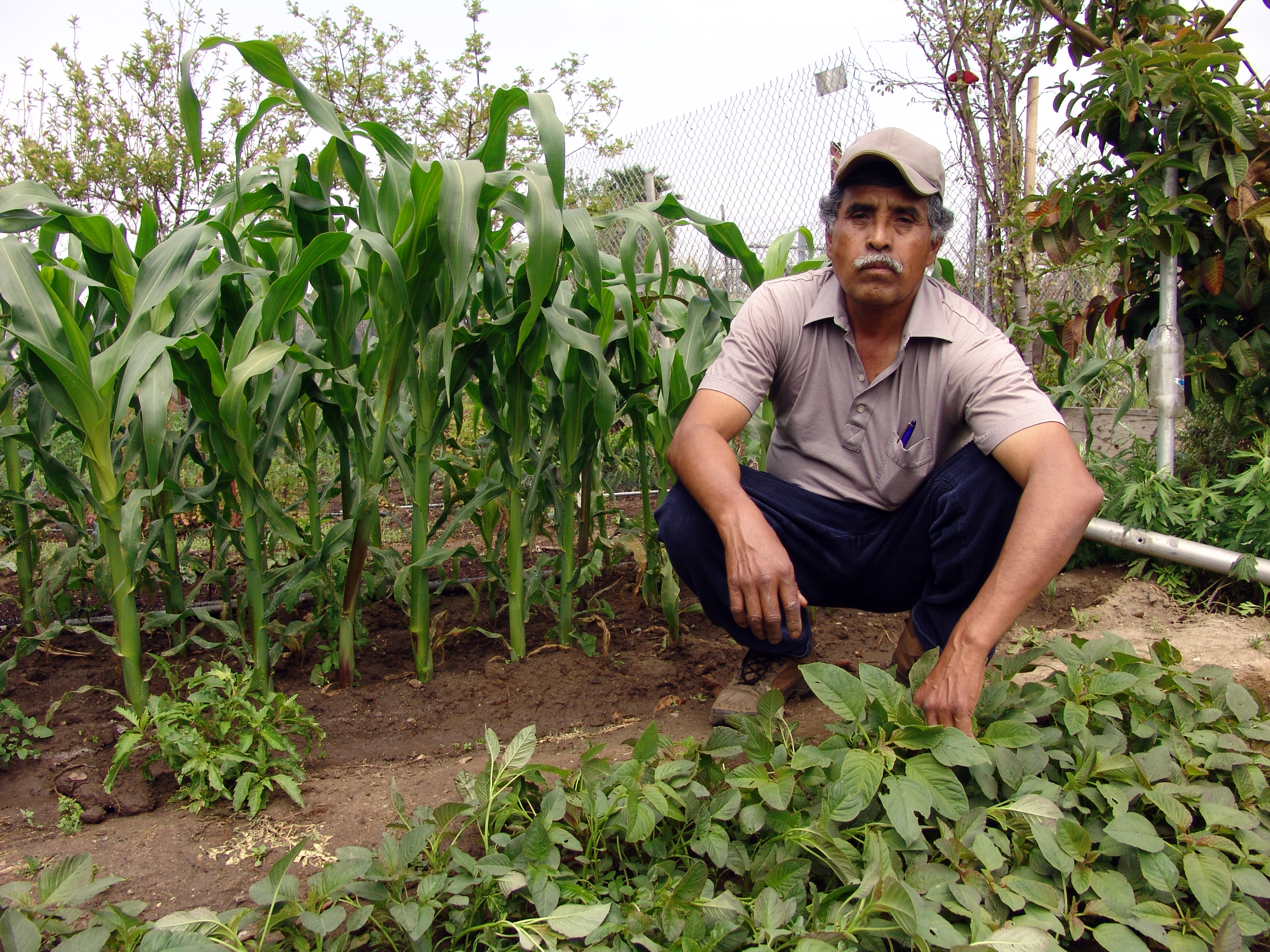
South Central Farm was one of the largest urban gardens in the United States before its demolition in 2006.

Vacant lot farms are community-managed farm sites, but are often seen by authorities as temporary rather than permanent. For example, Los Angeles' South Central Farm (1994–2006), one of the largest urban gardens in the United States, was bulldozed with approval from property owner Ralph Horowitz, despite community protest.

The possibilities and challenges for suburban or urban permaculture vary with the built environment around the world. For example, land is used more ecologically in Jaisalmer, India than in American planned cities such as Los Angeles:

the application of universal rules regarding setbacks from roads and property lines systematically creates unused and purposeless space as an integral part of the built landscape, well beyond the classic image of the vacant lot. ... Because these spaces are created in accordance with a general pattern, rather than responding to any local need or desire, many if not most are underutilized, unproductive, and generally maintained as ecologically disastrous lawns by unenthusiastic owners. In this broadest understanding of wasted land, the concept is opened to reveal how our system of urban design gives rise to a ubiquitous pattern of land that, while not usually conceived as vacant, is in fact largely without ecological or social value.

— Korsunsky (2019), "From vacant land to urban fallows: a permacultural approach to wasted land in cities and suburbs"

== Issues ==
=== Intellectual property ===
Trademark and copyright disputes surround the word permaculture. Mollison's books claimed on the copyright page, "The contents of this book and the word PERMACULTURE are copyright." Eventually Mollison acknowledged that he was mistaken and that no copyright protection existed.

In 2000, Mollison's U.S.-based Permaculture Institute sought a service mark for the word permaculture when used in educational services such as conducting classes, seminars, or workshops. The service mark would have allowed Mollison and his two institutes to set enforceable guidelines regarding how permaculture could be taught and who could teach it, particularly with relation to the PDC, despite the fact that he had been certifying teachers since 1993. This attempt failed and was abandoned in 2001. Mollison's application for trademarks in Australia for the terms "Permaculture Design Course" and "Permaculture Design" was withdrawn in 2003. In 2009 he sought a trademark for "Permaculture: A Designers' Manual" and "Introduction to Permaculture", the names of two of his books. These applications were withdrawn in 2011. Australia has never authorized a trademark for the word permaculture.

=== Definition ===
The broad range of topics discussed in permaculture has led to criticism that permaculture is not clearly defined. Peter Harper from the Centre for Alternative Technology has lamented that, "for some people 'Permaculture' is a generic term for sustainable living, giving another whole set of shifting, fuzzy meanings". Even permaculture texts have expressed that "there are as many permaculture definitions as there are permaculturists", although this is also seen as a strength of the flexibility of permaculture principles.

Studies of permaculture farms have shown a diversity as well as a number of consistent features. A 2017 study of 36 self-described American permaculture farms found a variety of business strategies, including small mixed farms, integrated producers of perennial and animal crops, mixes of production and services, livestock, and service-based businesses. A 2019 study by Hirschfeld and Van Acker found that adopting permaculture consistently encouraged cultivation of perennials, crop diversity, landscape heterogeneity, and nature conservation. They found that grass-roots adopters were "remarkably consistent" in their implementation of permaculture, leading them to conclude that the movement could exert influence over positive agroecological transitions.

=== Scientific basis ===
Permaculture as a popular movement has been largely isolated from scientific literature. Most permaculture literature is non-scientific in nature and is written for non-specialists. Many permaculturalists rarely engage with mainstream research in agroecology, agroforestry, or ecological engineering, and permaculture publications rarely cite academic sources. In parallel, it was observed in 2007 that few academic papers studied permaculture principles or permaculture farm productivity. Going back to Mollison and Holmgren's early publications, permaculturalists have often claimed that mainstream science has an elitist or pro-corporate bias, or that academic institutions are too rigid to study the interdisciplinary approach permaculture proposes.

This divide has led some to criticise permaculture as pseudo-scientific or to call for a more clear methodology to be used. Peter Harper has attempted to draw a distinction between "'cult' permaculture", where oversimplified claims are assumed to be true and go untested, and "'smart' permaculture", which acts "more like an immature academic field". Some permaculturalists have also observed oversimplification, such as Robert Kourik, who commented that the supposed advantages of "less- or no-work gardening, bountiful yields, and the soft fuzzy glow of knowing that the garden will ... live on without you" were often illusory.

More recently, permaculture has started to be an object of scientific study. Julius Krebs and Sonja Bach argue in a 2018 issue of Sustainability that there is "scientific evidence for all twelve [of Holmgren's] principles". In 2024, Reiff and colleagues stated that permaculture is a "sustainable alternative to conventional agriculture", and that it "strongly" enhances carbon stocks, soil quality, and biodiversity, making it "an effective tool to promote sustainable agriculture, ensure sustainable production patterns, combat climate change and halt and reverse land degradation and biodiversity loss." They point out that most of permaculture's most common methods, such as agroforestry, polycultures, and water harvesting features, are also backed by peer-reviewed research.

== See also ==
- Climate-friendly gardening – Gardening practices that aim to reduce and mitigate climate change
- Permacomputing – Concept in sustainable computing
- Zaï – Sahelian farming technique
