= Alhampton Mission Church =

Church in Somerset, England

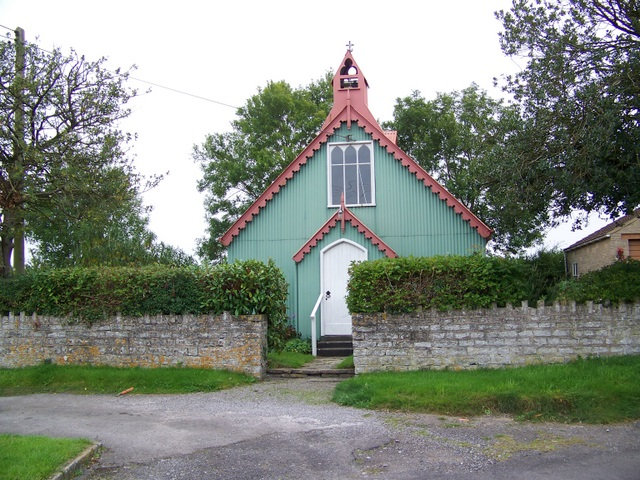

Religion
- Affiliation: Church of England
- Ecclesiastical or organizational status: Active

Location
- Location: Alhampton, Somerset, England
- Interactive map of Alhampton Mission Church
- Coordinates: 51.1098°N 2.5326°W

Architecture
- Type: Church
- Completed: 1892

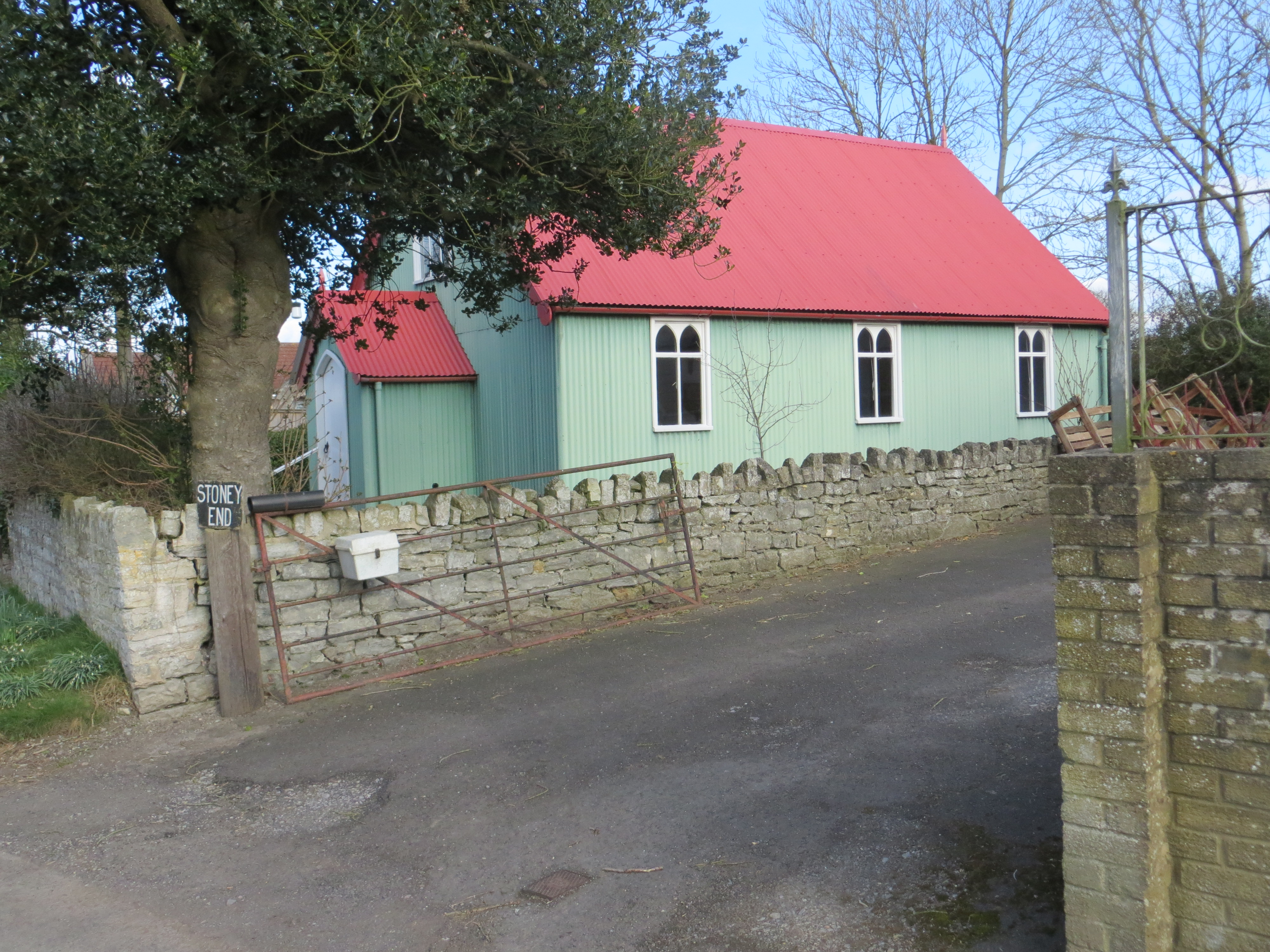
Side view in 2013

Alhampton Mission Church is a Church of England chapel in Alhampton, Somerset, England. The tin tabernacle was erected in 1892 and now forms part of the Fosse Trinity Benefice.

== History ==
Alhampton's iron church was erected in 1892 as a chapel of ease to the parish church of St Mary Magdalene at Ditcheat. A chapel of ease for Alhampton had been suggested as early as 1887. The rector of Ditcheat, Rev. C. E. Leir, determined to supply a chapel for Alhampton, in particular to serve those who struggled or were unable to get to the parish church, such as the elderly and sick.

Rev. Leir, with assistance from members of his family, obtained the iron chapel in 1892 and Mr. Butt of Manor Farm gifted the church's seating. The opening service was held on 12 October 1892, which included an address from Rev. Preb. Ainslie. The chapel, which cost £250, was almost free from debt by the beginning of 1893. £15 of its cost had been covered by a grant from the Bath and Wells Diocesan Societies.
