= Alhampton =

Village in Somerset, England

Coordinates: 51.1115°N 2.5329°W

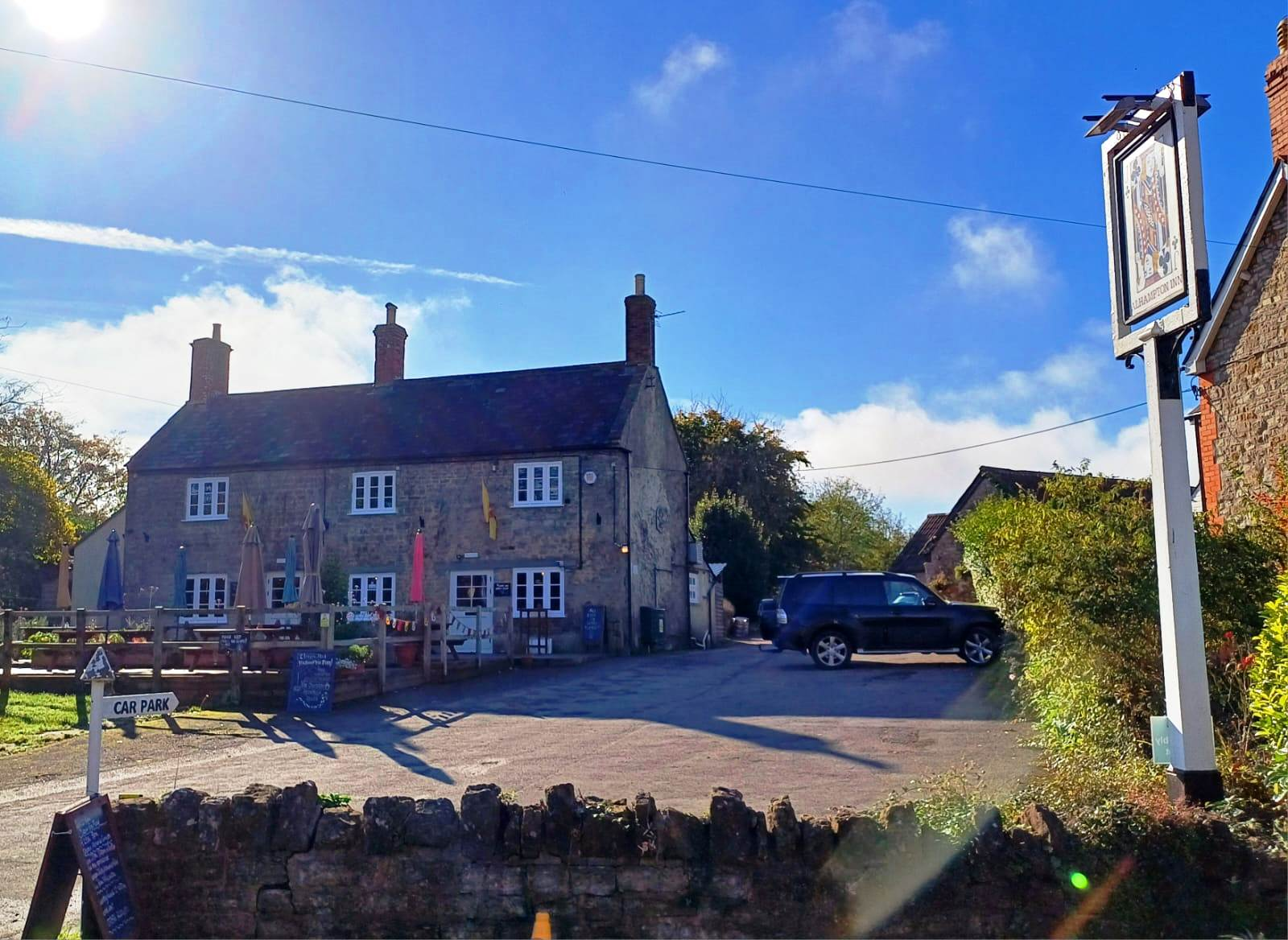
- The Alhampton Inn, reopened in 2023

- Location within Somerset
- OS grid reference: ST 62789 34825
- Civil parish: Ditcheat
- Unitary authority: Somerset Council
- Ceremonial county: Somerset
- Region: South West
- Country: England
- Sovereign state: United Kingdom
- Post town: SHEPTON MALLET
- Postcode district: BA4
- Dialling code: 01749
- Police: Avon and Somerset
- Fire: Devon and Somerset
- Ambulance: South Western
- UK Parliament: Frome and East Somerset

Alhampton is a small village 5 miles (8 km) south of Shepton Mallet, and 2 miles (3 km) north-west of Castle Cary, in Somerset, England. It lies within the civil parish of Ditcheat.

== Administration ==
Historically, Alhampton was classed as a tything of Ditcheat. Between 1894 and 1974 the village was administered within Shepton Mallet Rural District, and from then until 2023 it fell within Mendip District. It now comes under the unitary authority of Somerset Council.

== River Alham ==
The River Alham flows through Alhampton. It was known as the Alauna in Roman times, and supported several mills between the Domesday Book and the 18th century. One of them, at Alhampton, had an Archimedes' screw turbine installed in 2010 to generate hydro-electric power.

== Alhampton Chapel ==
Alhampton Chapel, also known as Alhampton Mission Church, forms part of the Fosse Trinity Benefice within the Church of England. The building is a tin tabernacle erected in 1892 as a chapel of ease to the parish church of St Mary Magdalene at Ditcheat. In 1887, the rector of Ditcheat, Rev. C. E. Leir, determined to supply a chapel for Alhampton, in particular to serve those who struggled or were unable to get to the parish church, such as the elderly and sick. The chapel cost £250, opened in 1892, and was almost free from debt by the beginning of 1893. It now holds regular monthly and other occasional services.

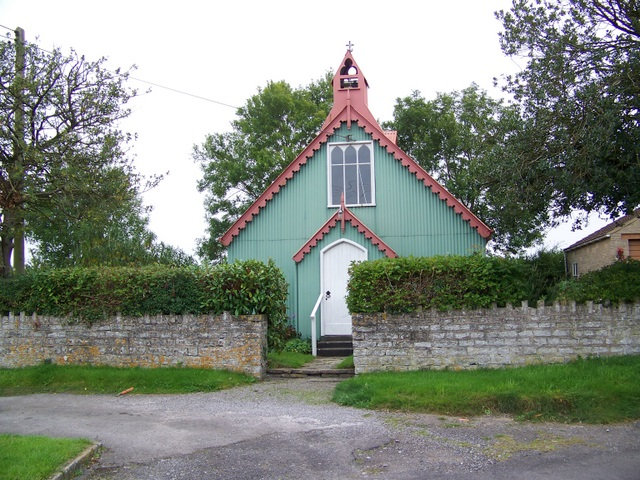
Alhampton Chapel

== Alhampton Inn ==
The Alhampton Inn, also known as the Knave of Clubs, is claimed to have been an alehouse from at least the seventeenth century, and a public house from the nineteenth century. After it closed in late 2022, a community initiative supported by the Plunkett Foundation was set up to reopen the pub, and this was successfully achieved in August 2023. In 2024, the pub won a Prince of Wales Award of Honour, and was listed by the Daily Mail as one of the hundred best pubs in Britain.

== Buildings ==
Alhampton has ten listed buildings, all of grade II status, including Alhampton Court, built in about 1650 of Cary stone, a local form of limestone.

== Haddon Wood ==
A new woodland, Haddon Wood, was established at Alhampton on 28 acres (11 ha) of land donated by the owner in 2013 to the Woodland Trust for the benefit of the local community. The land has been planted with native and orchard trees, and has a pond.

== Gardens ==
Alhampton runs an Open Gardens Scheme weekend each year. The village is home to horticulturalist Charles Dowding.

== Transport ==
Alhampton is located close to the A37 road, linking Bristol and Bath to the north with Yeovil and Dorchester to the south; and to the A371 between Shepton Mallet and Castle Cary. The village is 1.5 miles (2.4 km) from Castle Cary railway station on the Reading to Taunton line.
