= Sheet mulching =

Agricultural and gardening practice

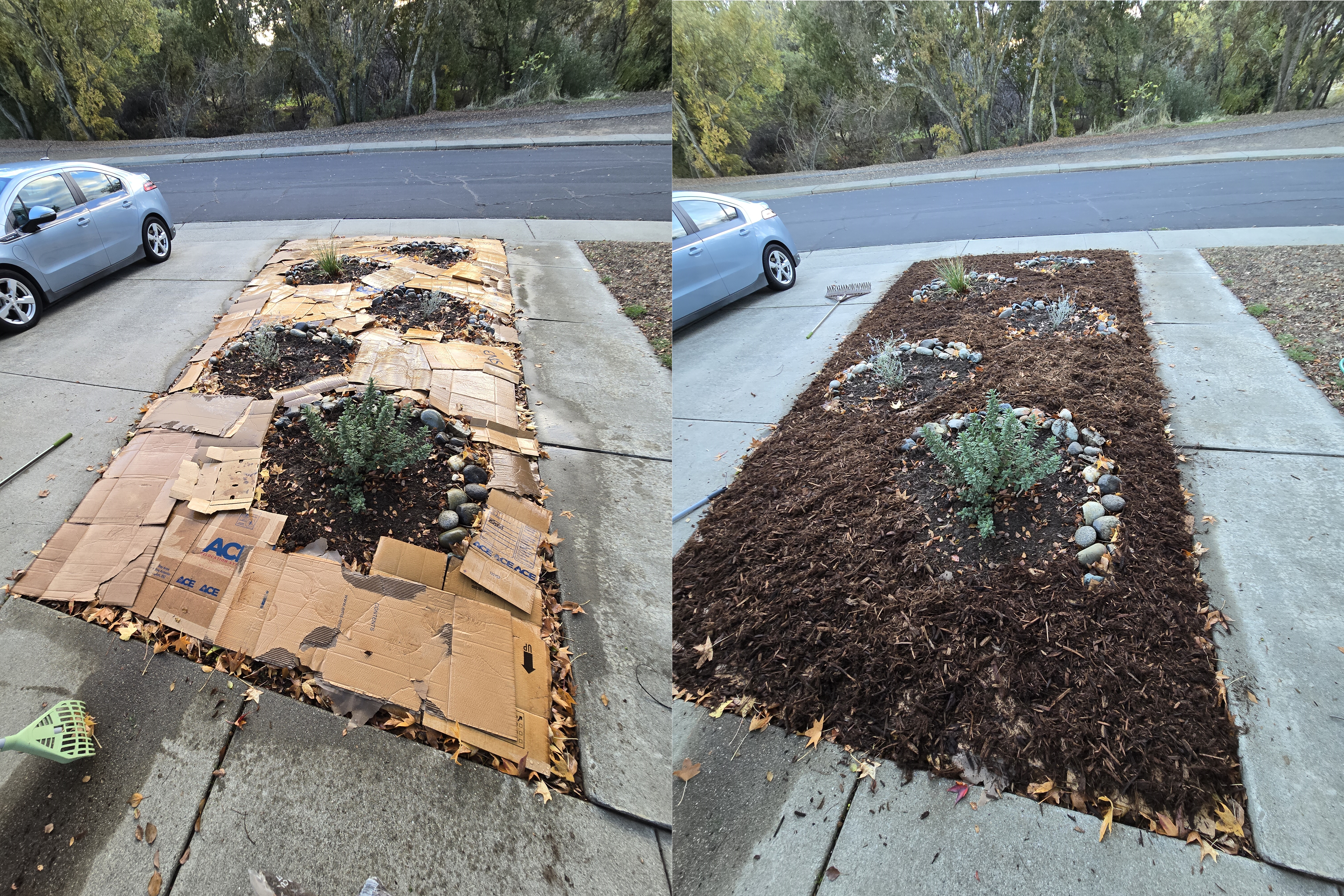
Views of a sheet mulched area with a layer of cardboard and the overlayer of redwood mulch on top

In permaculture, sheet mulching is an agricultural no-dig gardening technique that attempts to mimic the natural soil-building process in forests. When deployed properly and in combination with other permaculture principles, it can generate healthy, productive, and low-maintenance ecosystems.

Sheet mulching, also known as composting in place, mimics nature by breaking down organic material from the topmost layers down. The simplest form of sheet mulching consists of applying a bottom layer of decomposable material, such as cardboard or newspapers, to the ground to kill existing vegetation and suppress weeds. Then, a top layer of organic mulch is applied. More elaborate sheet mulching involves more layers. Sheet mulching is used to transform a variety of surfaces into a fertile soil that can be planted. Sheet mulching can be applied to a lawn, a dirt lot full of perennial weeds, an area with poor soil, or even pavement or a rooftop.

== Technique ==
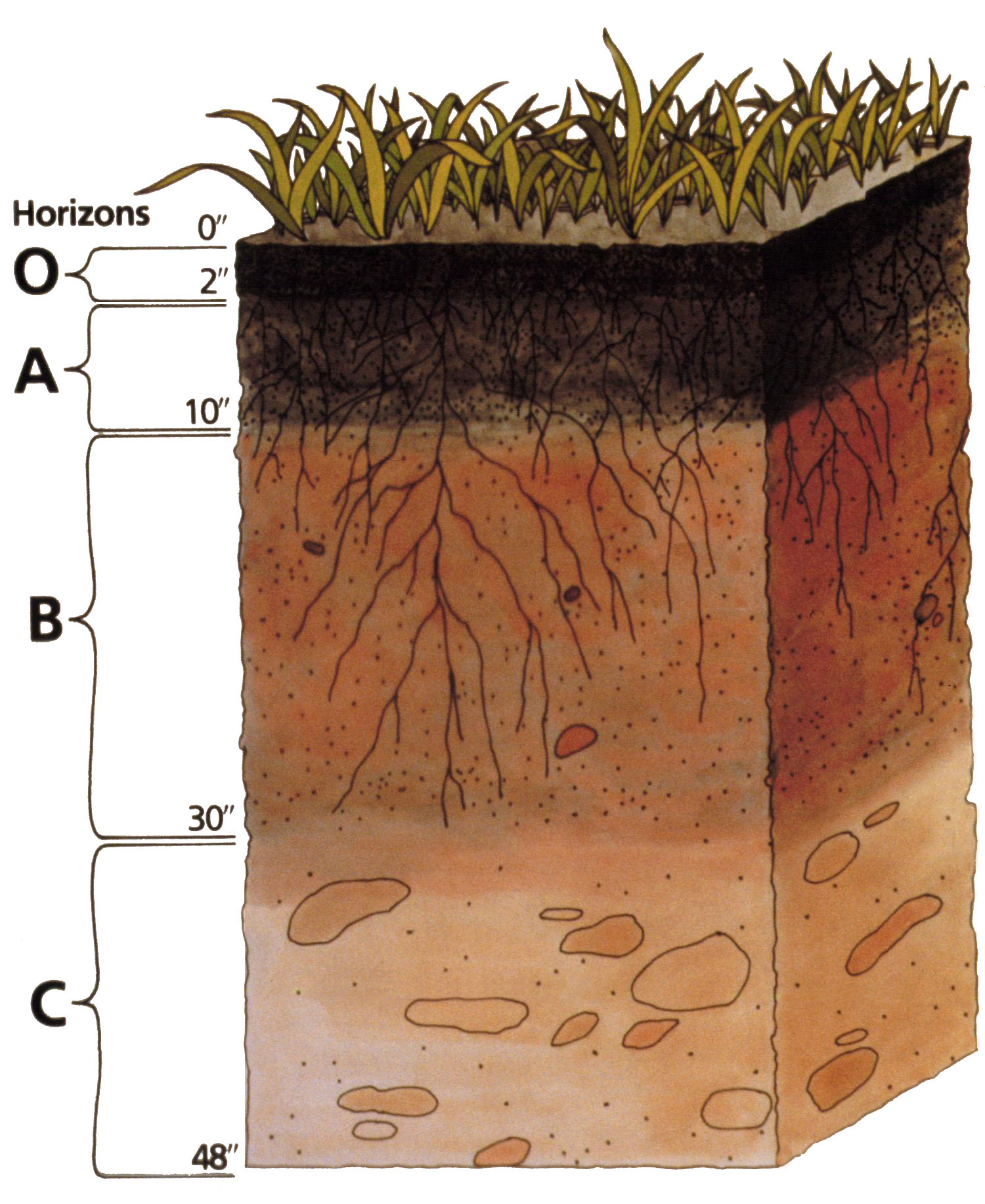
Typical layers of natural soil.

A model for sheet mulching consists of the following steps:

1. The area of interest is flattened by trimming down existing plant species, such as grasses.
2. The soil is analyzed, and its pH is adjusted (if needed).
3. The soil is moisturized (if needed) to facilitate the activity of decomposers.
4. The soil is then covered with a thin layer of slowly decomposing material (known as the weed barrier), typically cardboard. This suppresses the weeds by blocking sunlight, adds nutrients to the soil as weed matter quickly decays beneath the barrier, and increases the mechanical stability of the growing medium.
5. A layer (around 10 cm thick) of weed-free soil, rich in nutrients, is added, in an attempt to mimic the surface soil, or A horizon.
6. A layer (at most 15 cm thick) of weed-free, woody, and leafy matter is added in an attempt to mimic the forest floor, or O horizon. Theoretically, the soil is now ready to receive the desirable plant seeds or transplants.

== Variations and considerations ==
- Some varieties of grasses and weeds may be beneficial in a number of ways. Such plants can be controlled and used rather than eradicated. See also: mulch, list of beneficial weeds.
- Very thick barriers can create anaerobic conditions.
- Often, the barrier is applied a few months before planting to ensure the penetration of roots of newly planted seeds.
- Sheets of newspaper and clothing can be used instead of cardboard.
- Fibrous mulch from redwood bark, sometimes called "gorilla hair", can be advantageous in windy areas, due to its ability to weave together in a continuous mat.
- One variation of mulching, called Hügelkultur, involves using buried logs and branches as the first layer of the bed.
- Before step 4, an initial layer (2–3 kg/m^{2}) of matter rich in nutrients (such as compost or manure) may be added to bolster decomposition.
- Some permaculturists incorporate composting in step 5, step 6, or both.

== Advantages ==
Sheet mulch has important advantages relative to conventional methods, such as tilling, plowing, or applying herbicides:

- Improvement of desirable plants' health and productivity.
- Retention of water and nutrients and stabilization of biochemical cycles.
- Improvement of soil structure, soil life, and prevention of soil erosion.
- Avoidance of potentially dangerous pesticides, especially herbicides.
- Reduction of overall maintenance labor and costs.
- Most of the materials required to sheet mulch can be collected at no cost, and materials can be substituted for those readily available in certain areas. For instance, suburban areas may have a plentiful supply of leaves, and farming communities may have spoiled hay and manure.

== Disadvantages ==
- Some weed seeds (such as those of Bermuda grass and species of bindweed) may persist under the barrier and within the soil seed bank.
- Termites are attracted to the area. While they are a natural part of the ecosystem that transforms the weed barrier into rich soil, they can pose a hazard to nearby wood-framed structures.
- Slug populations may increase during the early stages of decomposition. However, they can be kept away or harvested.
- The system may need a constant supply of organic material, at least during the early stages.
- Roaming animals may interrupt the sheet mulching process.

== See also ==
- Agroecology
- Ecoagriculture
- Ecological design
- Ecosystem approach
- Forest gardening
