= River Alham =

River in Somerset, England

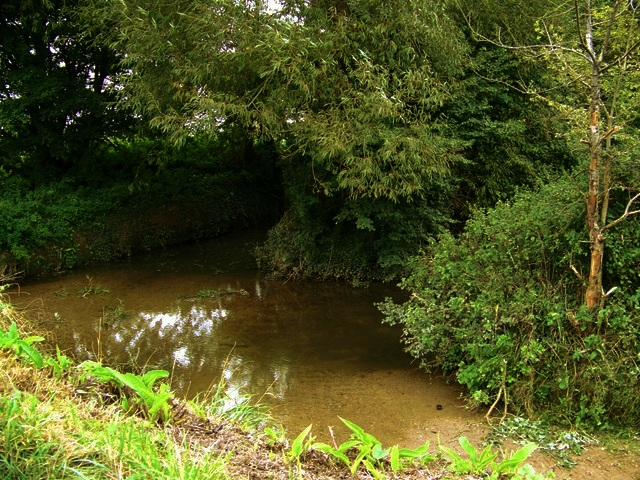
- The ford across the river at Alhampton

Location
- Country: England
- County: Somerset
- City: Milton Clevedon

Physical characteristics
- Source: Higher Alham
  - location: Somerset, England
  - coordinates: 51°10′16″N 2°27′49″W
- Mouth: River Brue
  - location: Alford, Somerset, England
  - coordinates: 51°05′37″N 2°34′03″W
- Length: 16 km (9.9 mi)

The River Alham flows through Somerset, England.

It rises at Higher Alham above Batcombe and runs through Alhampton, Milton Clevedon and joins the River Brue to the north of Alford.

It was known as the Alauna in Roman times.

The river supported several mills between the Domesday Book and the 18th century. One of them, at Alhampton, has had an Archimedes' screw turbine installed to generate hydro-electric power.

Boulter's Bridge, which spans the border between Ditcheat and West Bradley parishes, is of medieval origin and has been designated as a scheduled monument.
