= Charles Dowding =

English horticulturalist and author

Charles Dowding (born 1959) is an English horticulturalist and author who has pioneered modern no dig and organic soil management in the UK since 1983.

== Life and work ==
Dowding spent his childhood on a dairy farm in Somerset. He graduated from his degree in geography at Cambridge University in 1980, having been influenced by environmental writers such as Rachel Carson. In the 1980s he worked for a hotel in the Hebrides.

Dowding joined the Soil Association and began with his own organic, no dig market gardening, interested in improving quality of soil, while making a vegetable garden beautiful, ornamental, productive and supportive of biodiversity. He became influenced by the approaches of gardeners such as Ruth Stout, who championed strategies of leaving organic matter on the soil surface, rather than working it into the soil. Dowding started one of the UK's first vegetable box distribution schemes, bringing produce to local homes. In 1990 he left to live in France and Zambia before returning to settle back in Somerset for the rest of his life. He has worked four farms in Somerset, trialling and teaching organic, no dig methods and experimented with various forms of mulch. With his wife he also ran a bed and breakfast business, inspired by their time in France.

At Homeacres, in Alhampton near Castle Cary, Dowding now lectures and runs courses on no dig gardening methods, writing for assorted newspapers and the BBC. He is described as the "Guru of No Dig" and has published over ten books on the subject. In 2021 the work was featured at the RHS Hampton Court Flower Show. In 2024 he was awarded a RHS Elizabeth Medal of Honour for his work to promote no-dig gardening.

== Methods ==
Dowding states that, with one helper, he can produce 100 kg of produce from a 10sqm plot and generates £20,000 worth of vegetables per year (2020 prices). He does not believe in the principles of crop rotation, or digging out vegetables to harvest. Hoeing and other forms of soil disturbance are minimally used; no pesticides, herbicides, fungicides or synthetic fertilisers are used. Main resources for enriching crops are pesticide-free manure and homemade organic compost. He proposes that if the soil is left unmolested, the community of biodiverse microbes, insects, invertebrates and important fine fungi can thrive. He suggests that fully alive humus holds moisture, air, and food for the resident life. Fungal proteins, such as glomalin from arbuscular mycorrhizal fungi, are left intact to spread and thrive, benefiting the soil, and leading to a reduction in erosion. After weeding, adding a thick layer of mulch to the soil helps to feed the plot and keep the annual weeds from growing by blocking their access to light.

Traditional garden methods suggest that soil should be dug over each autumn in order to aerate it, aid drainage and add growth improvers like manure. Dowding and other 'no dig' proponents state these approaches are not needed and do not support the resources of the soil.

== Views ==
Dowding has become known for denying human made climate change and his support of the chemtrail conspiracy theory.

== Publications ==
- Organic Gardening: The Natural No-Dig Way (2007)
- Salad Leaves for All Seasons: Organic Growing from Pot to Plot (2008)
- Charles Dowding's Vegetable Course (2012)
- How to Grow Winter Vegetables (2011)
- Gardening Myths and Misconceptions (2014)
- Charles Dowding's Veg Journal: Expert no-dig advice, month by month (2014)
- How to Create a New Vegetable Garden: Producing a Beautiful and Fruitful Garden from Scratch (2015)
- Charles Dowding's Vegetable Garden Diary: No Dig, Healthy Soil, Fewer Weeds (2016)
- No Dig Organic Home & Garden: Grow, Cook, Use, and Store Your Harvest (2017)
- Charles Dowding's No Dig Gardening: From Weeds to Vegetables quickly and easily (2020)
- Skills for Growing (2022)
- No Dig (2022)
- Compost – Transform Waste into New Life (2024)
- Grow Together: 50 planting partnerships to boost your harvests (2026)
