= Church of St Mary Magdalene, Ditcheat =

Church in Somerset, England

Church of St Mary Magdalene
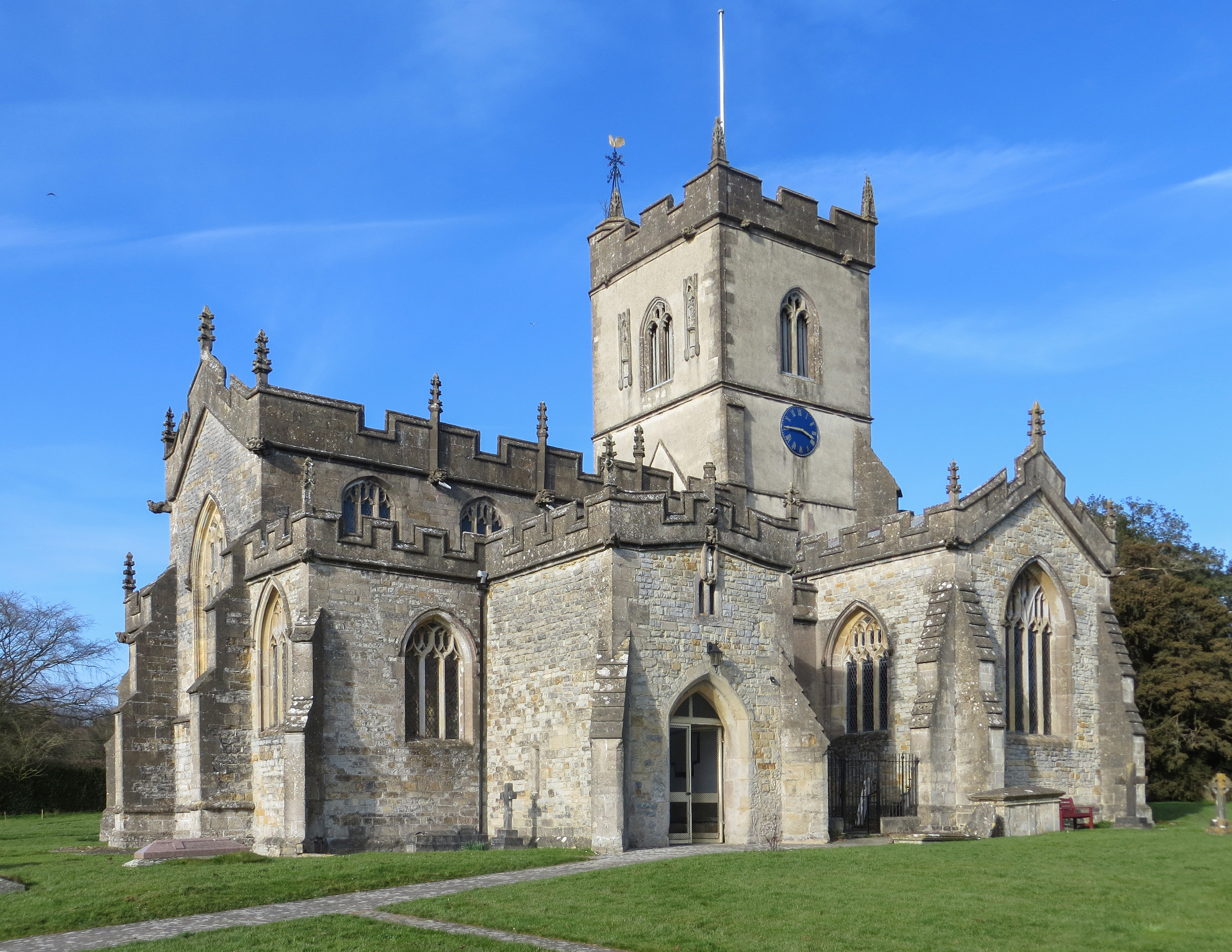
- Church of St Mary Magdalene from the south-west

- Location in Somerset
- OS grid reference: ST 62569 36329
- Location: Ditcheat, Somerset, England
- Country: England
- Denomination: Church of England
- Website: www.ditcheatchurch.org

History
- Status: Parish church
- Founded: c. 824
- Dedication: Mary Magdalene

Architecture
- Functional status: Active
- Heritage designation: Grade I listed
- Designated: 2 June 1961

Administration
- Province: Canterbury
- Diocese: Bath and Wells
- Archdeaconry: Wells
- Deanery: Shepton Mallet
- Benefice: Fosse Trinity
- Parish: Ditcheat

The Church of St Mary Magdalene is the Church of England parish church for the village of Ditcheat, Somerset, England. There has been a church on the site since 824, and the present building owes much of its grandeur to the Abbots of Glastonbury. Historic England have designated it a Grade I listed building.

== History ==
=== Pre-conquest ===
The first church at Ditcheat is believed to have been founded in 824, though all traces of this building have disappeared with centuries of rebuilding. This date comes from an ancient parish book, found by Rev. Henry Tripp in an old chest during the early 1930s.

In 842, Æthelwulf, King of Wessex, granted an estate of 25 hides of land in Ditcheat to Eanulf, a Somerset ealdorman, which included the villages of Ditcheat and Lottisham. In 867, Eanulf, dying, gave the estate to the Abbot of Glastonbury. Glastonbury Abbey continued to manage the estate until the abbey was dissolved in 1539, as part of the Dissolution of the Monasteries.

=== 12th and 13th centuries ===
In the 12th century, the church was demolished and rebuilt, and as such, no trace of the Saxon church remains. The Norman church that replaced it was likely cruciform in plan, as was common with many churches built at that time. The present church also incorporates 12th-century work in the tower and transepts, which gives further evidence that the Norman church likely comprised a simple nave, tower, transepts and chancel.

In the 13th century, during the reign of Henry III, the dedication of the church was altered to its present form of St Mary Magdalene. The previous dedication of the church is unknown. The 13th century also saw the rebuilding of the chancel, at the time only one storey high, in the Early English Gothic style.

=== 14th and 15th centuries ===
In the 14th century, the chancel was raised by a further stage, unusually by adding a row of windows directly on top of the old, giving the appearance of a two-storey building.

During the final decades of the 15th centuries, the church saw major rebuilding, which included demolishing the old Norman transepts and nave, and rebuilding them in the Gothic style. The tower, primarily dating from the 12th century, was also heightened by adding an additional storey, and massive corner buttresses added to the eastern corners to support the added weight. A fan vault was added to the empty space inside the tower; it was most likely a lantern tower before this. A rood loft was added across the nave arch, separating the nave from the tower and east end.

=== 16th and 17th centuries ===
The church saw much change again during the 16th and 17th centuries, including the removal of the rood loft and staircase, and damage caused by the English Civil War. The church, like many others, was damaged by Oliver Cromwell and his forces, including smashing many stained glass windows, destroying monuments and furnishings, and decapitating the head from the churchyard cross. As such, many of the windows in the church, especially in the nave, are now made from clear glass.

=== 18th – 20th centuries ===
In 1753, a gallery was erected across the western end, though this was removed just under a century later, in a restoration of 1850–1860. This restoration involved removing the galleries, re-roofing the chancel, and adding a new reredos, north transept screen, and choir stalls. A new organ by W. G. Vowles was added, also in the north transept, during 1888.

In 1920, major restoration was required again and was carried out in three stages. The first stage, carried out from 1920 to 1924, involved recasting the church bells and restoring the tower and clock, at a cost of £1,731. The second stage, the largest and longest, involved the renewing of floors, seating, walls, heating apparatus, the restoration of the roofs of chancel, north transept and nave aisles, at a cost of £1,791. The third and final stage, lasting from 1931 to 1932, included the restoration of the nave and south transept roofs, and the pinnacles, parapets, and gables. This final stage was overseen by Mr W. D. Caroe, the Bath & Wells Diocesan Architect, and cost a further £793.

During this work, a beautiful and rare 13th-century fresco painting of St Christopher was discovered in the north nave aisle. This was restored and opened up too, carried out by Mr P. L. Blevins of Glasgow, who bore the cost of restoring the fresco entirely. The total cost of the restoration project was £4,315, and the parish raised more than £2,600 of the total sum. Donations also arrived from further afield, including from Gloucestershire, London, Canada, the United States, and New Zealand.

=== 21st century ===
As with all church buildings, constant maintenance is required to keep the building watertight and in good condition. Minor repair works have included new guttering and roof repairs. In January 2016, a significant patch of dry rot was discovered under the choir stalls in the chancel, and at the same time, the south transept roof required recovering. The total cost of these two works was more than £35,000.

== Architecture ==
=== Plan ===
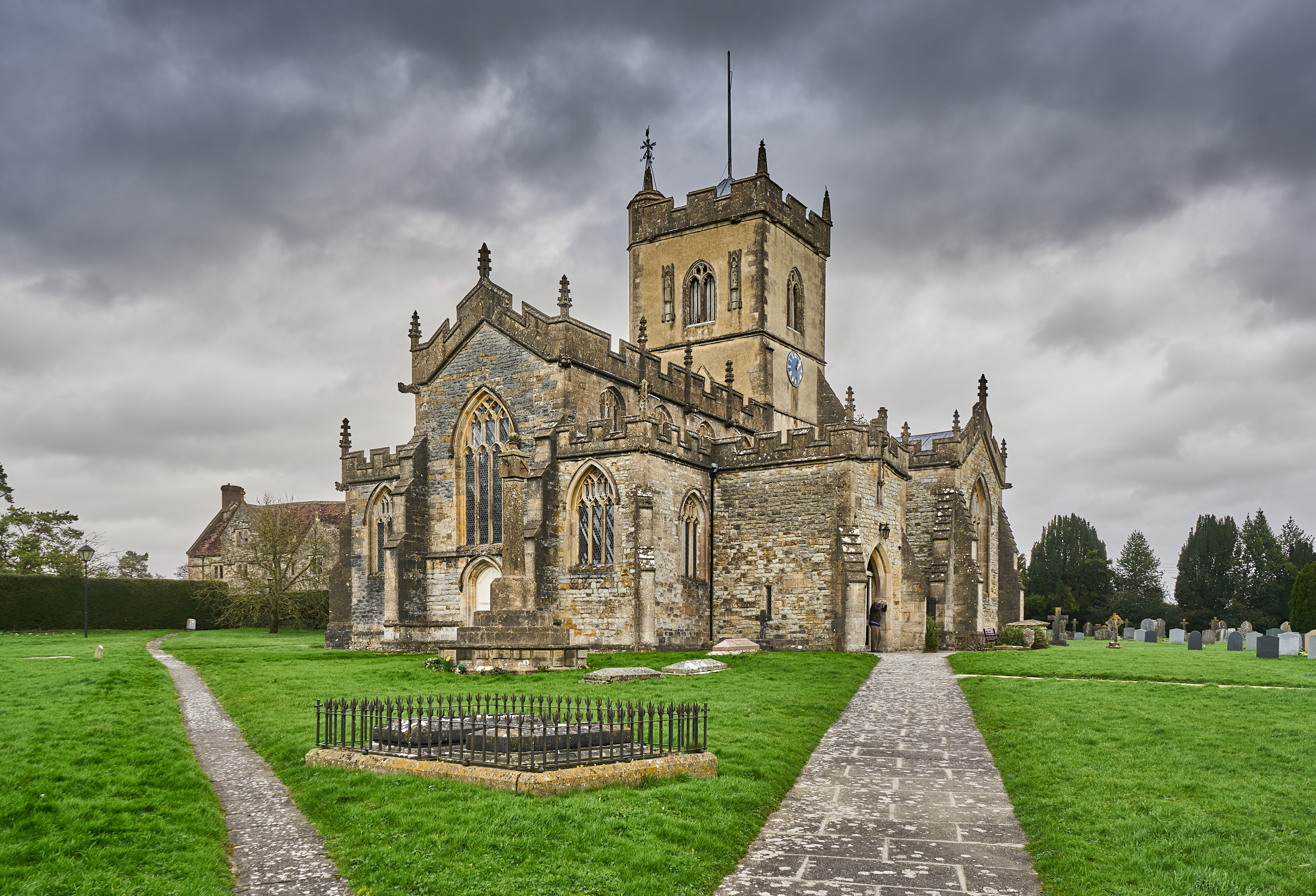
The church from the south-west in March 2020 during stormy conditions.

The church is built in a cruciform plan, with a four-bay aisled nave, transepts, three-bay chancel, and a low central tower. There is also a substantial south porch, almost transept-like in appearance. The church is built out of local Blue Lias stone. The church covers an area of 499 square metres (5,370 ft^{2}), which according to the Church of England, makes it a "medium" sized building.

=== Exterior ===
The church has a grand west façade, with the aisles finishing in three-light windows, and the nave in larger, four-light windows, separated by buttresses. The aisles and nave are embattled and feature three-light windows along their length, separated by buttresses. The nave clerestory buttresses finish in pinnacles that rise above the battlements. The 2nd bay of the south aisle is punctured by the large south porch, which is also embattled, featuring pinnacles and gargoyles. There is a very small window in the upper level of the porch, but there is no evidence there was ever a floor giving access to the upper storey. The battlements above the nave clerestory are more substantial than their corresponding aisle battlements, appearing both thicker and longer.

The north and south transepts are lower than the nave and chancel: the walls are only slightly higher than the nave aisles. They too are embattled, featuring pinnacles. There are three-light windows in the east and west faces of the transepts, with larger four-light windows in the north and south faces. The transepts have larger corner buttresses on their north and south gables.

The chancel is of three bays, features two rows of windows, the lower stage from the 13th century, and the upper from the 14th, giving the impression of a two-storey structure. The chancel also has an embattled parapet but features shields in relief rather than pinnacles. The shields depict Robert Stillington, Bishop of Bath and Wells (1466–91), John Selwood, Abbot of Glastonbury (1457–93), and John Gunthorp, Dean of Wells. (1465–98). The lower windows of the chancel are two-light, the upper windows are three-light, and they differ in design. The eastern gable has a large three-light window, featuring unusual geometrical tracery.

The central tower rises two storeys above the present roof ridge and is supported by two massive corner buttresses on the south-east and north-east faces of the tower, added when the tower was heightened in the 15th century. The lower storeys of the tower are 12th century in origin, and the old level of the Norman roof ridge can be seen on the western face. The tower must have been almost invisible before its heightening, as the roof ridge came right up to the top of the Norman work. It was heightened in the 15th century and features two-light boarded belfry windows, an embattled parapet, a weather vane and a flagpole. The entrance to the tower is in the north nave aisle, where a short spiral staircase leads to the transept roof, and a further staircase ascends the north face of the tower, culminating in a weather vane.

=== Interior ===
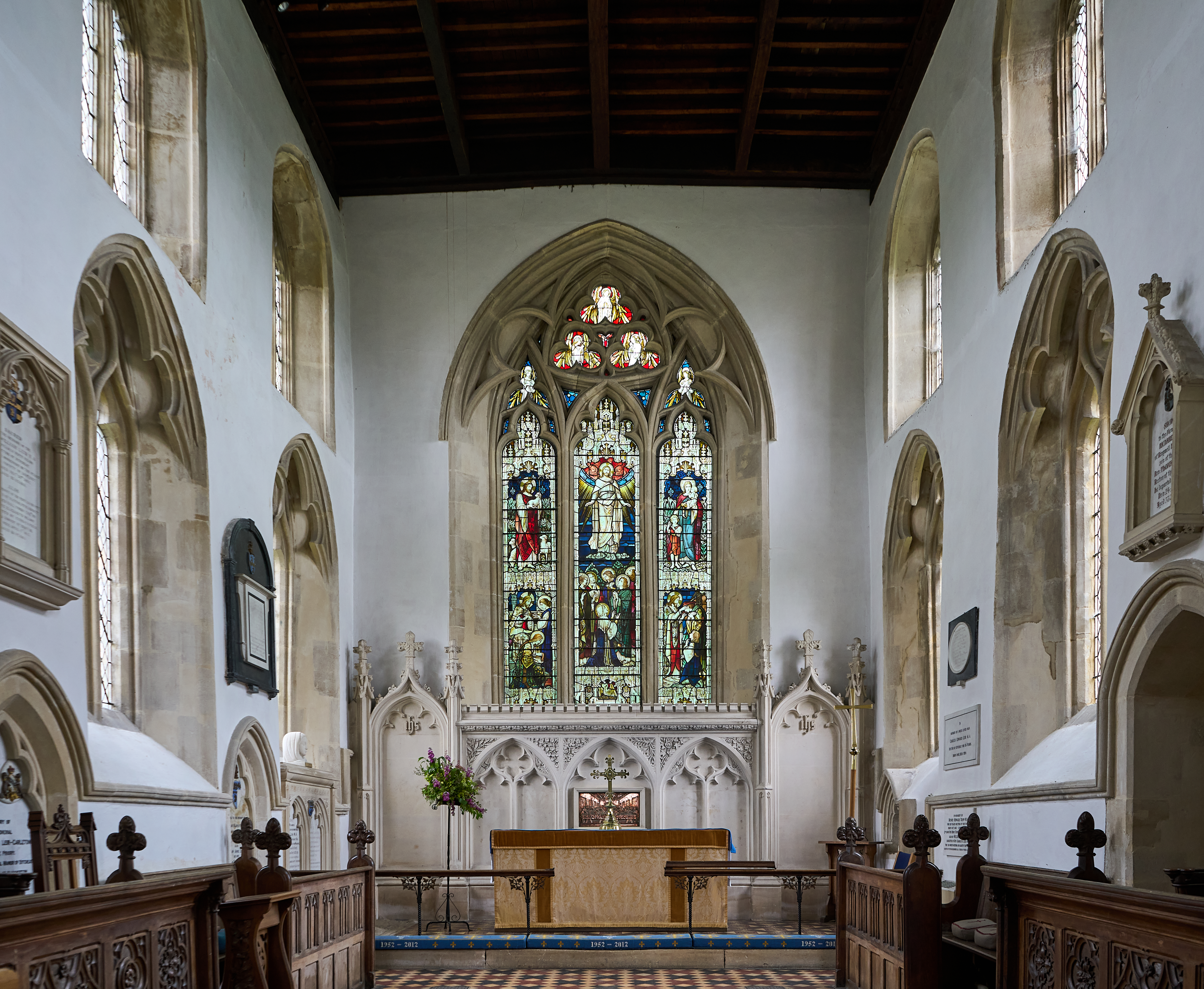
The 13th and 14th century chancel, showing the geometrical tracery, and 19th century reredos and choir stalls.

The nave arcade is tall, the aisles narrow, and the nave light. There is little remaining stained glass in the nave, much of it was destroyed in the English Civil War. The nave clerestory has corbels that support the fine tie-beam roof, dating from the late 15th century. The aisle roofs are of simple lean-to construction, featuring moulded ribs, bosses and angel corbels. The door to the former rood screen in the nave is still visible above the tower arches, and the corbels supporting the rood screen are visible underneath it. There is an intricately carved Jacobean pulpit in the nave, which stands on a stone base. There is also a 17th-century clerk's desk, and like the pulpit, this is intricately designed.

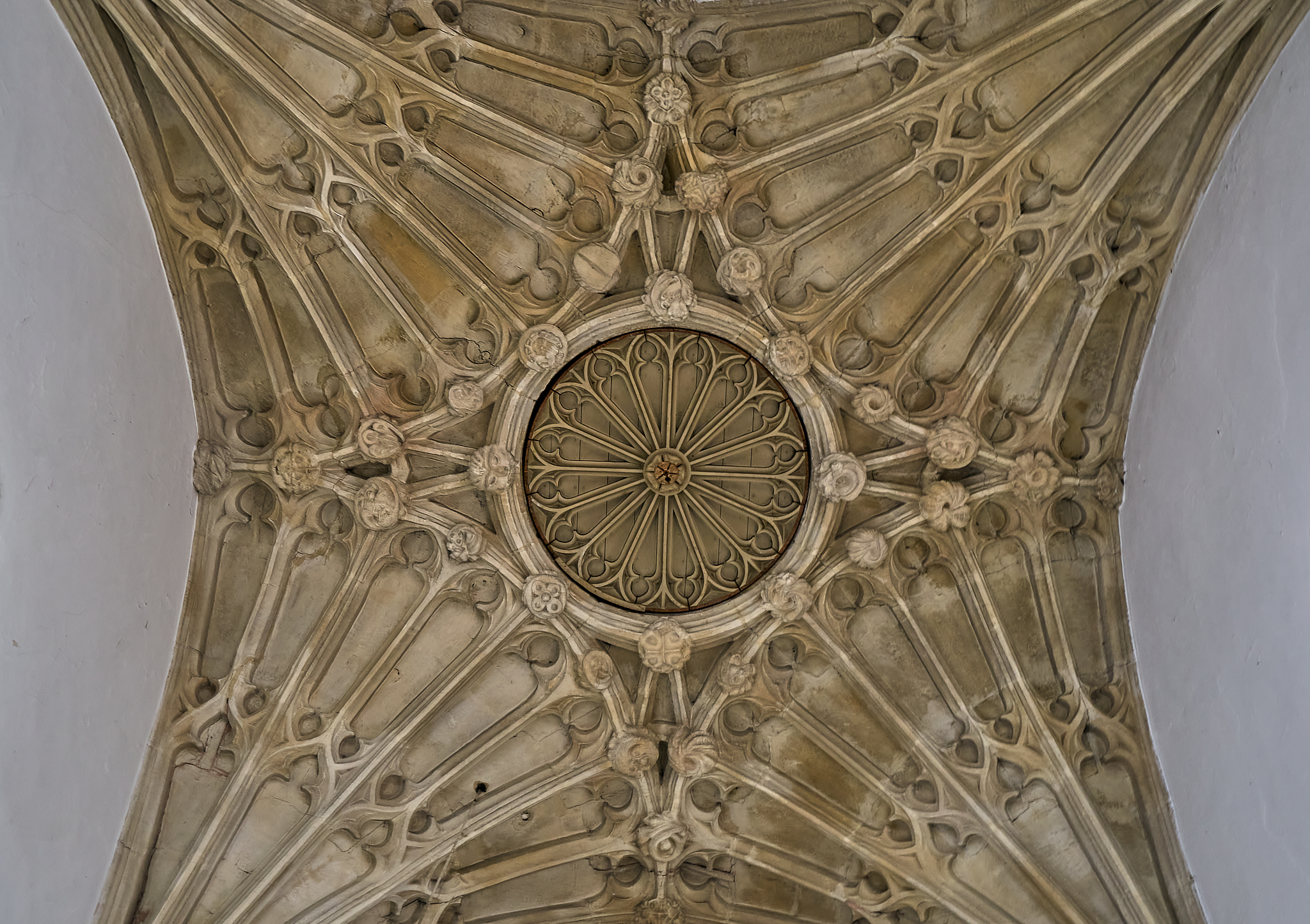
The Perpendicular Gothic fan vault underneath the tower.

The tower arches at the crossing are slightly bent in their central sections, indicating potential problems with the tower in the past, and the need for the massive supporting buttresses. Underneath the tower is a highly decorative stone fan vault, a hallmark of the Perpendicular Gothic style.

The south transept, much like the nave, has little stained glass but does have several monuments, including an excellent 18th-century marble monument with a pediment and a bust. The north transept is mostly occupied by the organ but does have a 19th-century screen, incorporating some 17th century work. The transepts have hagioscopes, to allow those seated in the transepts to see the altar.

The chancel is the most richly decorated part of the building, featuring most of the surviving medieval stained glass in the church. The windows have beautiful geometric tracery, with similarities to the now ruinous Tintern Abbey in Monmouthshire, Wales, and decorative arches with carved foliage. The chancel roof is a simple 19th-century construction. It has High Victorian Gothic fittings, including choir stalls, reredos and altar.

The interior is mostly whitewashed flagstone, that of the north transept is left bare.

The organ, situated in the north transept, is a moderately sized instrument, manufactured by W.G. Vowles of Bristol in 1888. The organ has a pitch-pine case and decorative pipes. It features two manuals, three couplers and a 16 ft swell.

== Bells ==
During the 17th century, there were four bells at Ditcheat, including at least one 15th century bell. In 1685, these bells were augmented to five by Thomas Purdue of Closworth, who recast the tenor, and added a treble bell. In 1750, these were augmented to six with a treble cast by William Cockey, and all six bells rehung in a new anticlockwise wooden frame by George Nott. The tenor bell weighed 17 long hundredweight (860 kg).

By 1902, restoration was required. The wooden frame from 1750 was in good condition and was strengthened with iron corner plates. The bells were all quarter-turned to reduce the wear on their soundbows, and they received new gudgeons, bearings and clapper joints from John Taylor & Co of Loughborough, Leicestershire. The clock room floor was also removed to give ringers more headroom, and the clock mechanism re-sited to the edge of the ringing chamber so that the bell ropes no longer pass through it. The bells were rededicated and reopened on 23 November 1902.

In 1918, the 3rd bell cracked, and an estimate was obtained from John Taylor & Co for recasting the 3rd and augmenting the bells to eight with two new trebles. The estimate came to £772. However, only a year later, the 4th bell also cracked, so the estimate was revised to recasting all six bells, and augmenting them to eight. This new estimate came to £1,462. There was some caution to spending this money, money the village did not have, so a compromise was reached between the parish and John Taylor & Co. The terms of the contract, signed on 19 July 1920, says that the parish would pay any money they have up front, and then pay any outstanding money as it comes in. No interest was to be charged on the outstanding balance in the first twelve months.

The project began almost straight away, for Taylor's bell hanger was at Ditcheat in August to remove the old bells and frame. A problem occurred when it was discovered that in the 1902 restoration, the ringing chamber ceiling had been re-boarded, and no trapdoor had been included, for it was not expected that the bells would be lowered again so soon. Whilst this was well within the skill set of Taylor's bell hanger, it was not in the terms of the contract, so an additional charge of £53 was incurred for cutting a trapdoor. The bells were then lowered through the circular hatch in the fan vaulting into the church, and out into the churchyard. The bells were then sent by cart to nearby Evercreech Junction, and on to Loughborough by train.

In November, Taylor's invited the parish up to the foundry to witness the casting of the new bells. The new bells were cast on 14 December 1920 at 2 pm. The bells arrived back at Ditcheat via Evercreech Junction on 26 February 1921. The load involved the bells themselves, all new fittings for the bells, including ball bearings, a new cast iron frame, and two lengths of railway line. The lengths of railway line, purchased from the Somerset and Dorset Railway Company, were to be installed on the roof beams, to allow the hoist and tackle to be attached from which the bells would be lifted into the belfry. The frame was a very tight fit in the tower, for some of the stonework needed to be dressed to accommodate it.

The new bells were dedicated on 11 April 1921 by Basil Willson, Bishop of Bath and Wells. The first peal on the new bells was on 14 May 1921, comprising 5040 changes of Grandsire Triples.

Since recasting in 1920, the bells have received no major work. They are a ring of eight bells, the tenor weighing 24 long hundredweight and 4 pounds (1,221 kg), and are regarded as one of the finest rings of eight bells in the world. The bells are all named after the Nine Fruits of the Spirit, and in order from smallest to largest, these are: 'Love', 'Joy', 'Peace', 'Longsuffering & Gentleness', 'Goodness', 'Faith', 'Meekness', and 'Temperance'. The bells are very popular with visiting ringers, with almost 200 full peals recorded on the present peal of bells.

The bells are hung with traditional Taylor fittings, including cast iron headstocks, ball bearings, gudgeons, wrought iron clappers, and Hasting stays. They recently celebrated their 100th anniversary.

== See also ==
- List of Grade I listed buildings in Mendip
- List of towers in Somerset
- List of ecclesiastical parishes in the Diocese of Bath and Wells
