= Ruth Stout =

American writer (1884–1980)

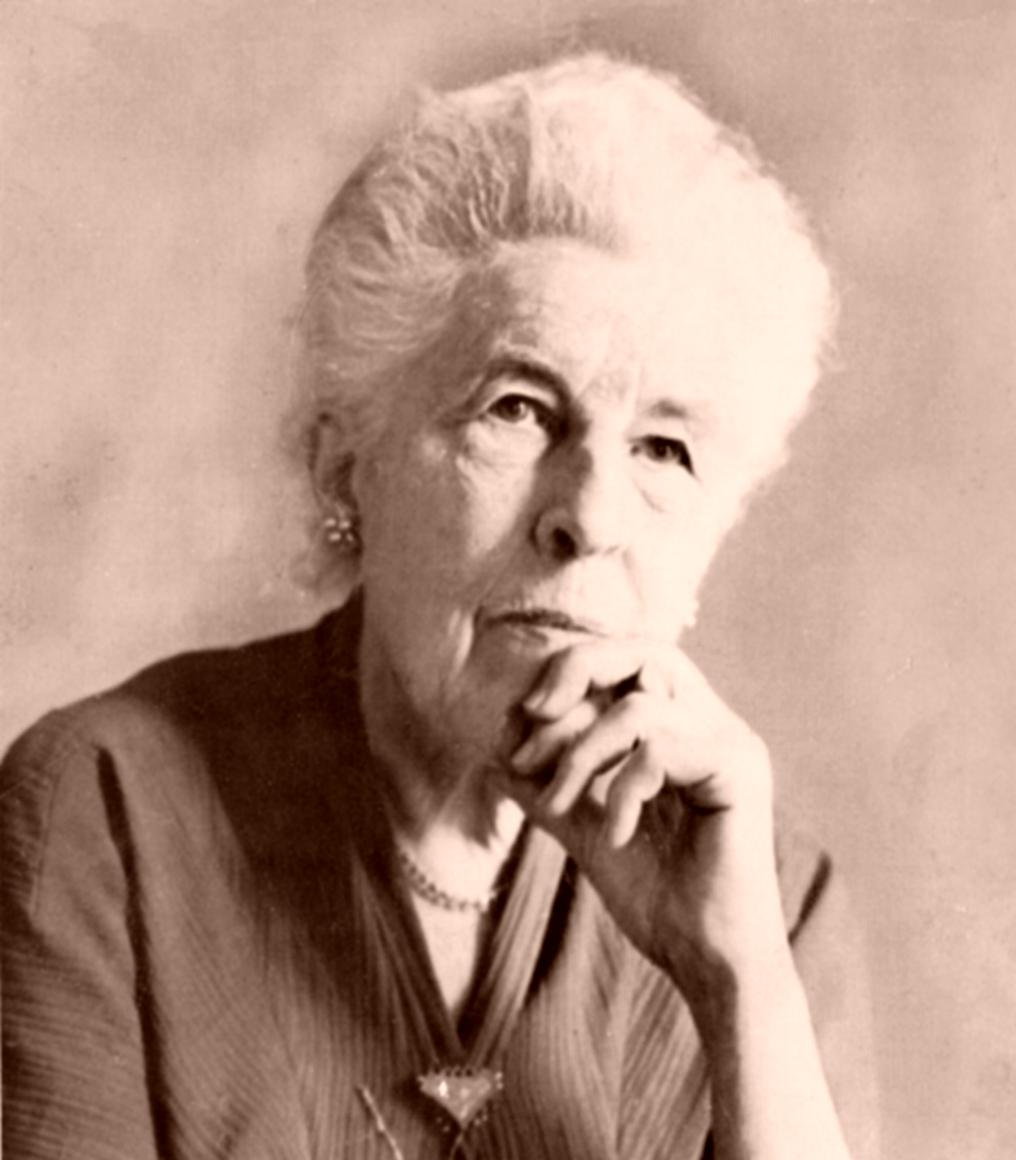
- Born: Ruth Imogen Stout; June 14, 1884; Topeka, Kansas
- Died: August 22, 1980 (aged 96); Redding, Connecticut
- Occupation: Writer
- Spouse: Alfred Rossiter (married 1929–1960)
- Relatives: Rex Stout (brother)
- Writing career
- Language: English
- Genre: Gardening

Ruth Imogen Stout (June 14, 1884 – August 22, 1980) was an American author best known for her "No-Work" gardening books and techniques.

== Early and mid-life ==
Ruth Imogen Stout was born June 14, 1884, in Girard, Kansas, the fifth child of Quaker parents John Wallace Stout and Lucetta Elizabeth Todhunter Stout. Her younger brother Rex Stout, also an author, was famous for the Nero Wolfe detective stories.

At age 16 Stout accompanied temperance activist Carrie Nation in a 'joint hatchetation', smashing the windows of a Topeka bar to protest against the public sale of alcohol. Nation was arrested but Stout was ignored by the police and proceeded to deal more damage.

Stout moved to New York when she was 18 and was employed at various times as a baby nurse, a bookkeeper, a secretary, a business manager, and a factory worker. She was a lecturer and coordinated lectures and debates, and she owned a small tea shop in Greenwich Village and worked for a fake mind-reading act.

In 1923, she accompanied fellow Quakers to Russia to assist in famine relief. She married Fred Rossiter in June 1929 at age 45. Rossiter, the son of an American businessman, was born in Germany in 1882. His family relocated to New York City in 1894. In March 1930, the couple moved to a 55-acre (220,000 m^{2}) farm in Poverty Hollow, Redding Ridge, on the outskirts of Redding, Connecticut. Rossiter, a Columbia-trained psychologist, followed his passion for wood turning and subsequently became known for his wooden bowls. Stout decided to try her luck at gardening, and in the spring of 1930, she planted her first garden.

== Roots of the no-work method ==
During her first year of gardening and for many years after, Ruth employed conventional techniques and practices in her garden with mixed results. She had to wait for someone else to come and plow the fields before she could start. This gentleman was frequently late or delays would occur due to mechanical failures. Wasted time lessened the already short growing season and tried her patience. Furthermore, the manual labor involved in planting a traditional garden became more than she could handle by herself. In the spring of 1944, after following the advice of other gardeners who used commercial fertilizers, "poisonous sprays" and plowing for fifteen years, Stout decided that she wasn't going to wait for the plowman, nor was she going to plow on her own. Instead she planted the seeds and covered them, waiting to see what would happen, and discovered surprising success.

== The Stout system ==
Stout claimed that to be successful her system required a thick mulch of at least 8 inches. She suggests that if starting a new garden in poor soil it is beneficial to plow manure in the first year and then proceed with the mulch, which is to be left on the garden year-round. After the first year, plowing is no longer needed and compost piles are not necessary either - the "compost pile" is maintained in place in the seed beds and garden paths. Mulching material is a combination of what ever one can find at hand, similar to the same materials that one might find in a compost heap.

== Later life ==
As the years progressed, Stout refined her techniques, eventually adopting a year-round mulch which virtually eliminated the labor associated with traditional gardening. Her minimalist approach spawned a long-running series of articles in Organic Gardening and Farming magazine as well as several books. Stout wrote under her maiden name but had changed her legal name to Rossiter after getting married.

Her husband, Fred, died on November 24, 1960, after an extended illness. Her sister, Mary, who also lived at Poverty Hollow for over 40 years, died on August 20, 1977, at 88.

== Works ==
- Stout, R. (1955). How to have a Green Thumb without an Aching Back: A New Method of Mulch Gardening. New York: Exposition Press, 1955, ISBN 0-88365-144-0
- Stout, R. (1958). Company Coming: Six Decades of Hospitality, Do-It-Yourself and Otherwise. New York: Exposition Press, Reprinted by Norton Creek Press, 2012, ISBN 978-0-9819284-8-7
- Stout, R. (1960). It's a Woman's World. Garden City, NJ: Doubleday & Co., Inc.
- Stout, R. (1962). If You Would Be Happy. Garden City, NJ: Doubleday & Co., Inc. Reprinted by Norton Creek Press, 2016, ISBN 978-1-938099-00-7
- Stout, R. (1963). Gardening Without Work: For the Aging, the Busy & the Indolent. New York: The Devin-Adair Company, Reprinted by Norton Creek Press, 2011, ISBN 978-0-9819284-6-3
- Stout, R. & Clemence, R. (1971). The Ruth Stout No-Work Garden Book: Secrets of the year-round mulch method. Emmaus, PA: Rodale Press.
- Stout, R. (1975). As We Remember Mother. New York: Exposition Press.
- Stout, R. (1975). I've Always Done It My Way. New York: Exposition Press.
- Stout, R. (2002). Don't Forget to Smile or How to Stay Sane and Fit over Ninety.
