= List of scheduled monuments in Mendip =

Mendip shown within Somerset and England

Mendip is a local government district of Somerset in England. The Mendip district covers a largely rural area of 285 square miles (738 km^{2}) ranging from the Mendip Hills through on to the Somerset Levels. It has a population of approximately 110,000. The administrative centre of the district is Shepton Mallet but the largest town (with more than twice the population of Shepton Mallet) is Frome.

A scheduled monument is a nationally important archaeological site or monument which is given legal protection by being placed on a list (or "schedule") by the Secretary of State for Culture, Media and Sport; Historic England takes the leading role in identifying such sites. The legislation governing this is the Ancient Monuments and Archaeological Areas Act 1979. The term "monument" can apply to the whole range of archaeological sites, and they are not always visible above ground. Such sites have to have been deliberately constructed by human activity. They range from prehistoric standing stones and burial sites, through Roman remains and medieval structures such as castles and monasteries, to later structures such as industrial sites and buildings constructed for the World Wars or the Cold War.

There are 234 scheduled monuments in Mendip. These include a large number of bowl and round barrows and other neolithic, Bronze and Iron Age tumuli such as the Priddy Circles and Priddy Nine Barrows and Ashen Hill Barrow Cemeteries. There are also several Iron Age hill forts on the hill tops and lake villages on the lowlands such as Meare and Glastonbury Lake Villages. The lake villages were often connected by timber trackways such as the Sweet Track. There are several Roman sites particularly around the Charterhouse Roman Town and lead mining. Some later coal mining sites are also included in the list.

Two major religious sites in Mendip at Glastonbury Abbey and Wells Cathedral and their precincts and dispersed residences, tithe barns and The Abbot's Fish House, are included in the list. Prehistoric defensive features such as Ponter's Ball Dyke were supplemented in the medieval period by motte-and-bailey castles such as Farleigh Hungerford, Nunney and Fenny Castle. Commercial and industrial development is represented by the Old Iron Works at Mells and various market crosses. The most recent site on the list is a World War II bombing decoy complex and anti-aircraft obstructions, which were built in 1940, on Black Down, the highest point of the Mendip Hills. The monuments are listed below using the titles given in the Historic England data sheets.

== Monuments ==
Name	Location	Type	Completed (Note: The date given is the date used by Historic England as significant for the initial building or that of an important part in the structure's description.)	Grid ref. (Note: The grid reference is based on the British national grid reference system, sometimes known as OSGB36, used by the Ordnance Survey.) Geo-coordinates	Notes	Entry number (Note: The "List Entry Number" is a unique number assigned to each listed building and scheduled monument by Historic England.)	Image	Ref.
An area of the Romano-British linear village at Fosse Lane, Shepton Mallet	Shepton Mallet	Earthworks	Romano-British	ST 62920 42423; 51°10′47″N 2°31′54″W	Earthworks from a Romano-British village next to the Fosse Way.	1011635	Upload Photo	
Ashen Hill barrow cemetery: a group of eight round barrows 500 m southeast of Harptree Lodge	Priddy	Round barrows	Bronze Age	ST 53911 52055; 51°15′46″N 2°39′45″W	Priddy Nine Barrows and Ashen Hill Barrow Cemeteries are a collection of round barrows, dating from the Bronze Age. The barrows sit on crests of land at either end of a field in an area of the Mendip Hills with several Neolithic remains. They are assumed to be related to the Priddy Circles which lie 750 metres (2,460 ft) to the north. Ashen Hill consists of six bowl barrows and two bell barrows aligned east to west while Priddy Nine Barrows divided into one group of seven round barrows and another pair slightly separated from the others. Excavations in 1815 uncovered cremation burials and grave goods. A geophysical magnetometry survey suggested that there may have been three further barrows.	1010513	Ashen Hill barrow cemetery: a group of eight round barrows 500 m southeast of Harptree Lodge	
Badger Hole, Wookey	St Cuthbert Out	Cave	Iron Age	ST 53247 47954; 51°13′44″N 2°40′16″W	Badger Hole is a dry cave on the slopes above the Wookey ravine near the Wookey Hole Caves resurgence and contain in situ cave sediments laid down during the Ice Age. Just outside the cave the foundations of a 1st-century hut have been identified. These had been built on during the Roman era up to the end of the 4th century.	1010294	Upload Photo	
Barrow, 350 m east of Harptree Lodge	Chewton Mendip	Bowl barrow	Neolithic to Bronze Age	ST 54015 52388; 51°16′08″N 2°39′38″W	A bowl barrow close to Priddy Circles. The mound is approximately 20 metres (66 ft) in diameter.	1015921	Upload Photo	
Beckery Chapel and cemetery (site of)	Glastonbury	Cemetery	Middle Ages	ST 48405 38312; 51°08′30″N 2°44′20″W	The site of a chapel, also known as St Brigid's Chapel, and medieval cemetery. The chapel was "in ruins" in 1791. Excavations in 1967 found the remains of 63 burials.	1006147	Upload Photo	
Bell barrow south of Blackwell Tyning Plantation	Emborough	Bell barrow	Bronze Age	ST 60691 50278; 51°15′01″N 2°33′53″W	A bell barrow which is approximately 32 metres (105 ft) in diameter.	1008288	Upload Photo	
Bishop's palace	Wookey	Bishop's Palace	13th century	ST 51784 45647; 51°12′29″N 2°41′30″W	Earthworks from a medieval Bishop's Palace first documented in 1224 which may have been built by Jocelin of Wells. New buildings were added in the 1550s which included the only building which still survives and is used as Court Farmhouse.	1013588	Upload Photo	
Bishop's Palace ruined portions, walls and well house	Wells	Bishop's Palace	c. 1280	ST5516845702; 51°12′32″N 2°38′35″W	The Bishop's Palace and accompanying Bishops House is adjacent to Wells Cathedral and has been the home of the Bishops of the Diocese of Bath and Wells for 800 years. Building of the palace started around 1210 by Bishops Jocelin of Wells and Reginald Fitz Jocelin. The chapel and great hall were added by Bishop Robert Burnell between 1275 and 1292. The walls, gatehouse and moat were added in the 14th century by Bishop Ralph of Shrewsbury. The Bishops House was added in the 15th century by Bishop Thomas Beckington. The great hall later fell into disrepair and was partially demolished around 1830. The palace was originally surrounded by a medieval deer park. When the walls were built, streams were diverted to form the moat as a reservoir. In the 1820s, the grounds within the walls were planted and laid out as pleasure grounds by Bishop George Henry Law, who created a reflecting pond near the springs. Parts of the buildings are still used as a residence by the current bishop, however much of the palace is now used for public functions and as a tourist attraction.	1006201	Bishop's Palace ruined portions, walls and well house More images	
Bishop's tithe barn	Wells	Tithe barn	15th century	ST 55090 45532; 51°12′21″N 2°38′37″W	Local stone roughly squared, with Doulting ashlar dressings and a Westmorland slate roof. Royalist troops were quartered in the barn during the Bloody Assizes.	1003247	Bishop's tithe barn More images	
Bolter's Bridge, Hornblotton	Ditcheat	Bridge	Middle Ages	ST 60604 33410; 51°05′55″N 2°33′50″W	A medieval stone bridge, carrying a small road over the River Alham. The bridge is approximately 2 metres (6 ft 7 in) wide.	1006231	Bolter's Bridge, Hornblotton	
Bowl barrow 20 m northwest of Whitestown Farm	Priddy	Bowl barrow	Neolithic to Bronze Age	ST 52782 55227; 51°17′39″N 2°40′43″W	A bowl barrow which is 19 metres (62 ft) in diameter.	1011522	Upload Photo	
Bowl barrow 70 m east of Barrow House Farm	Chewton Mendip	Bowl barrow	Neolithic to Bronze Age	ST 60119 53250; 51°16′37″N 2°34′23″W	A bowl barrow which is 19 metres (62 ft) in diameter.	1011527	Upload Photo	
Bowl barrow 70 m northeast of King Down Farm	Priddy	Bowl barrow	Neolithic to Bronze Age	ST 50892 54211; 51°17′06″N 2°42′20″W	A bowl barrow which is 19 metres (62 ft) in diameter.	1011531	Upload Photo	
Bowl barrow 70 m northwest of Hill View	Priddy	Bowl barrow	Neolithic to Bronze Age	ST 52180 52320; 51°16′05″N 2°41′12″W	A bowl barrow which is 22 metres (72 ft) in diameter.	1010390	Upload Photo	
Bowl barrow 70 m west of Rowberrow Farm	Priddy	Bowl barrow	Neolithic to Bronze Age	ST 52000 52189; 51°16′00″N 2°41′22″W	A bowl barrow which is 17 metres (56 ft) in diameter.	1010425	Upload Photo	
Bowl barrow 90 m northeast of Hill View	Priddy	Bowl barrow	Neolithic to Bronze Age	ST 52299 52388; 51°16′07″N 2°41′06″W	A bowl barrow which is 18 metres (59 ft) in diameter.	1009747	Upload Photo	
Bowl barrow 100 m north east of Home Farm Cottage	Ston Easton	Bowl barrow	Neolithic to Bronze Age	ST 62202 54284; 51°17′11″N 2°32′36″W	A bowl barrow which is 21 metres (69 ft) in diameter.	1016296	Bowl barrow 100 m north east of Home Farm Cottage	
Bowl barrow 120 m north west of Burnt Wood	Emborough	Bowl barrow	Neolithic to Bronze Age	ST 59873 49566; 51°14′38″N 2°34′34″W	A bowl barrow which is 17 metres (56 ft) in diameter.	1008079	Upload Photo	
Bowl barrow 130 m west of St Lawrence's Church	Priddy	Bowl barrow	Neolithic to Bronze Age	ST 52694 51406; 51°15′35″N 2°40′45″W	A bowl barrow which is 24 metres (79 ft) in diameter.	1009768	Upload Photo	
Bowl barrow 150 m north east of Victoria Farm	St Cuthbert Out	Bowl barrow	Neolithic to Bronze Age	ST 59619 48618; 51°14′07″N 2°34′47″W	A bowl barrow which is 35 metres (115 ft) in diameter.	1016236	Upload Photo	
Bowl barrow 150 m southwest of King Down Farm	Priddy	Bowl barrow	Neolithic to Bronze Age	ST 50624 54034; 51°17′00″N 2°42′34″W	A bowl barrow which is 19 metres (62 ft) in diameter.	1011520	Upload Photo	
Bowl barrow 170 m south-east of Hunter's Lodge Inn	Priddy	Bowl barrow	Neolithic to Bronze Age	ST 55094 50086; 51°14′54″N 2°38′41″W	A bowl barrow which is 18 metres (59 ft) in diameter.	1010648	Upload Photo	
Bowl barrow 180 m southwest of Yoxter Farm	Priddy	Bowl barrow	Neolithic to Bronze Age	ST 51047 53886; 51°16′55″N 2°42′12″W	A bowl barrow which is 16 metres (52 ft) in diameter.	1011532	Upload Photo	
Bowl barrow 180 m west of Ubley Warren Farm	Priddy	Bowl barrow	Neolithic to Bronze Age	ST 51108 55226; 51°17′39″N 2°42′09″W	A bowl barrow which is 25 metres (82 ft) in diameter.	1010160	Upload Photo	
Bowl barrow 220 m south west of Ubley Hill Farmhouse	Priddy	Bowl barrow	Neolithic to Bronze Age	ST 51606 57202; 51°18′43″N 2°41′45″W	A bowl barrow which is 14 metres (46 ft) in diameter.	1010284	Upload Photo	
Bowl barrow 230 m north west of Hunter's Lodge Inn	Priddy	Bowl barrow	Neolithic to Bronze Age	ST 54710 50191; 51°14′57″N 2°39′01″W	A bowl barrow which is 10 metres (33 ft) in diameter.	1010182	Upload Photo	
Bowl barrow 250 m northeast of King Down Farm	Priddy	Bowl barrow	Neolithic to Bronze Age	ST 50941 54362; 51°17′11″N 2°42′17″W	A bowl barrow which is 21 metres (69 ft) in diameter.	1011530	Upload Photo	
Bowl barrow 250 m north west of Victoria Farm	St Cuthbert Out	Bowl barrow	Neolithic to Bronze Age	ST 59314 48669; 51°14′09″N 2°35′03″W	A bowl barrow which is 18 metres (59 ft) in diameter.	1016233	Upload Photo	
Bowl barrow 250 m south east of Redhill Farm	Emborough	Bowl barrow	Neolithic to Bronze Age	ST 60667 50669; 51°15′14″N 2°33′54″W	A bowl barrow which is 30 metres (98 ft) in diameter.	1016297	Upload Photo	
Bowl barrow 250 m west of Starve Lark Farm	Priddy	Bowl barrow	Neolithic to Bronze Age	ST 53251 55975; 51°18′04″N 2°40′19″W	A bowl barrow which is 24 metres (79 ft) in diameter.	1008078	Upload Photo	
Bowl barrow 260 m east of Templedown Farm	Priddy	Bowl barrow	Neolithic to Bronze Age	ST 51848 54848; 51°17′27″N 2°41′31″W	A bowl barrow which is 18 metres (59 ft) in diameter.	1011534	Upload Photo	
Bowl barrow 280 m south east of Ubley Hill Farmhouse	Priddy	Bowl barrow	Neolithic to Bronze Age	ST 52012 57325; 51°18′47″N 2°41′24″W	A bowl barrow which is 12 metres (39 ft) in diameter.	1010282	Upload Photo	
Bowl barrow 300 m north of Hazel Manor	Priddy	Bowl barrow	Neolithic to Bronze Age	ST 52749 57059; 51°18′39″N 2°40′45″W	A bowl barrow which is 17 metres (56 ft) in diameter.	1010265	Upload Photo	
Bowl barrow 300 m north east of Whitnell Corner	Emborough	Bowl barrow	Neolithic to Bronze Age	ST 59872 49026; 51°14′20″N 2°34′34″W	A bowl barrow which is 10 metres (33 ft) in diameter.	1011670	Bowl barrow 300 m north east of Whitnell Corner	
Bowl barrow 300 m south west of Harptree Lodge	Chewton Mendip	Bowl barrow	Neolithic to Bronze Age	ST 53553 52235; 51°16′03″N 2°40′02″W	A bowl barrow which is 18 metres (59 ft) in diameter.	1010287	Upload Photo	
Bowl barrow 300 m southwest of Moor View	Priddy	Bowl barrow	Neolithic to Bronze Age	ST 52107 49325; 51°14′28″N 2°41′15″W	A bowl barrow which is 18 metres (59 ft) in diameter.	1009773	Upload Photo	
Bowl barrow 300 m west of Newlands Farm	Chewton Mendip	Bowl barrow	Neolithic to Bronze Age	ST 57332 50604; 51°15′11″N 2°36′46″W	A bowl barrow which is 25 metres (82 ft) in diameter.	1008094	Upload Photo	
Bowl barrow 310 m southeast of Eastwater Farm	Priddy	Bowl barrow	Neolithic to Bronze Age	ST 53772 50538; 51°15′08″N 2°39′50″W	A bowl barrow which is 22 metres (72 ft) in diameter.	1009767	Upload Photo	
Bowl barrow 320 m east of Lodmore Farm	Priddy	Bowl barrow	Neolithic to Bronze Age	ST 53567 53914; 51°16′57″N 2°40′02″W	A bowl barrow which is 15 metres (49 ft) in diameter.	1010458	Upload Photo	
Bowl barrow 330 m north of Stoke Woods	Rodney Stoke	Bowl barrow	Neolithic to Bronze Age	ST 49160 51339; 51°15′32″N 2°43′48″W	A bowl barrow which is 17 metres (56 ft) in diameter.	1008086	Upload Photo	
Bowl barrow 340 m east of Templedown Farm	Priddy	Bowl barrow	Neolithic to Bronze Age	ST 51923 54875; 51°17′28″N 2°41′27″W	A bowl barrow which is 16 metres (52 ft) in diameter.	1011535	Upload Photo	
Bowl barrow 340 m north-east of Wellington Farm	Priddy	Bowl barrow	Neolithic to Bronze Age	ST 49267 54030; 51°16′59″N 2°43′44″W	A bowl barrow which is 17 metres (56 ft) in diameter.	1010644	Upload Photo	
Bowl barrow 350 m northeast of Cheddar Head Farm	Priddy	Bowl barrow	Neolithic to Bronze Age	ST 50408 53068; 51°16′29″N 2°42′44″W	A bowl barrow which is 12 metres (39 ft) in diameter.	1010635	Upload Photo	
Bowl barrow 350 m northwest of Fernhill Farm	Priddy	Bowl barrow	Neolithic to Bronze Age	ST 52523 55752; 51°17′56″N 2°40′57″W	A bowl barrow which is 16 metres (52 ft) in diameter.	1009745	Upload Photo	
Bowl barrow 350 m north west of Harptree Lodge	Priddy	Bowl barrow	Neolithic to Bronze Age	ST 53444 52804; 51°16′21″N 2°40′08″W	A bowl barrow which is 23 metres (75 ft) in diameter.	1010286	Upload Photo	
Bowl barrow 365 m south west of Ubley Warren Farm	Priddy	Bowl barrow	Neolithic to Bronze Age	ST 51132 54900; 51°17′28″N 2°42′08″W	A bowl barrow which is 40 metres (130 ft) in diameter.	1008287	Upload Photo	
Bowl barrow 370 m east of Ubley Hill Farmhouse	Priddy	Bowl barrow	Neolithic to Bronze Age	ST 52119 57378; 51°18′49″N 2°41′18″W	A bowl barrow which is 16 metres (52 ft) in diameter.	1010281	Upload Photo	
Bowl barrow 380 m south east of Southfield Farm	Priddy	Bowl barrow	Neolithic to Bronze Age	ST 55186 49623; 51°14′38″N 2°38′36″W	A bowl barrow which is 15 metres (49 ft) in diameter.	1010178	Upload Photo	
Bowl barrow 380 m south east of Beechbarrow	St Cuthbert Out	Bowl barrow	Neolithic to Bronze Age	ST 57466 48871; 51°14′15″N 2°36′38″W	A bowl barrow which is 15 metres (49 ft) in diameter.	1020020	Upload Photo	
Bowl barrow 390 m northeast of Bristol Plain Farm	Priddy	Bowl barrow	Neolithic to Bronze Age	ST 50691 52201; 51°16′00″N 2°42′29″W	A bowl barrow which is 26 metres (85 ft) in diameter.	1010483	Upload Photo	
Bowl barrow 390 m northwest of Fernhill Farm	Priddy	Bowl barrow	Neolithic to Bronze Age	ST 52469 55772; 51°17′57″N 2°40′59″W	A bowl barrow which is 15 metres (49 ft) in diameter.	1009763	Upload Photo	
Bowl barrow 400 m north of Stoke Woods	Rodney Stoke	Bowl barrow	Neolithic to Bronze Age	ST 49419 51291; 51°15′31″N 2°43′34″W	A bowl barrow which is 12 metres (39 ft) in diameter.	1008087	Upload Photo	
Bowl barrow 400 m north-west of Starve Lark Farm	Priddy	Bowl barrow	Neolithic to Bronze Age	ST 53091 56075; 51°18′07″N 2°40′27″W	A bowl barrow which is 20 metres (66 ft) in diameter.	1008077	Upload Photo	
Bowl barrow 400 m south of Rookham	St Cuthbert Out	Bowl barrow	Neolithic to Bronze Age	ST 55211 49240; 51°14′26″N 2°38′35″W	A bowl barrow which is 18 metres (59 ft) in diameter.	1016298	Upload Photo	
Bowl barrow 400 m southwest of Moor View	Priddy	Bowl barrow	Neolithic to Bronze Age	ST 51965 49326; 51°14′28″N 2°41′22″W	A bowl barrow which is 9 metres (30 ft) in diameter.	1010106	Upload Photo	
Bowl barrow 410 m northeast of Bristol Plain Farm	Priddy	Bowl barrow	Neolithic to Bronze Age	ST 50742 52157; 51°15′59″N 2°42′27″W	A bowl barrow which is 23 metres (75 ft) in diameter.	1010486	Upload Photo	
Bowl barrow 420 m east of Bristol Plain Farm	Priddy	Bowl barrow	Neolithic to Bronze Age	ST 50756 52106; 51°15′58″N 2°42′26″W	A bowl barrow, previously known as Green Barrow, which is 15 metres (49 ft) in diameter.	1010488	Upload Photo	
Bowl barrow 420 m north of Stoke Woods	Rodney Stoke	Bowl barrow	Neolithic to Bronze Age	ST 49276 51382; 51°15′33″N 2°43′42″W	A bowl barrow, previously known as Green Barrow, which is 12 metres (39 ft) in diameter.	1011918	Upload Photo	
Bowl barrow 430 m north of Whitnell Corner	Emborough	Bowl barrow	Neolithic to Bronze Age	ST 59788 49198; 51°14′26″N 2°34′39″W	A bowl barrow, which is 25 metres (82 ft) in diameter.	1008080	Upload Photo	
Bowl barrow 430 m north east of Stoke Woods	Rodney Stoke	Bowl barrow	Neolithic to Bronze Age	ST 49757 51180; 51°15′27″N 2°43′17″W	A bowl barrow, which is 14 metres (46 ft) in diameter.	1008088	Upload Photo	
Bowl barrow 430 m northwest of King Down Farm	Priddy	Bowl barrow	Neolithic to Bronze Age	ST 50352 54230; 51°17′06″N 2°42′48″W	A bowl barrow, which is 20 metres (66 ft) in diameter.	1011519	Upload Photo	
Bowl barrow 430 m southwest of King Down Farm	Priddy	Bowl barrow	Neolithic to Bronze Age	ST 50370 53922; 51°16′56″N 2°42′47″W	A bowl barrow, which is 10 metres (33 ft) in diameter.	1011521	Upload Photo	
Bowl barrow 435 m north west of Ivy Cottage	St Cuthbert Out	Bowl barrow	Neolithic to Bronze Age	ST 54435 48464; 51°14′01″N 2°39′14″W	A bowl barrow, which is 9 metres (30 ft) in diameter.	1020495	Upload Photo	
Bowl barrow 450 m east of Bristol Plain Farm	Priddy	Bowl barrow	Neolithic to Bronze Age	ST 50782 52033; 51°15′55″N 2°42′24″W	A bowl barrow, which is 21 metres (69 ft) in diameter.	1010481	Bowl barrow 450 m east of Bristol Plain Farm	
Bowl barrow 450 m north west of Harptree Lodge	Priddy	Bowl barrow	Neolithic to Bronze Age	ST 53308 52803; 51°16′21″N 2°40′15″W	A bowl barrow, which is 16 metres (52 ft) in diameter.	1010285	Upload Photo	
Bowl barrow 450 m south-east of Red Quar Farm	Chewton Mendip	Bowl barrow	Neolithic to Bronze Age	ST 56517 51667; 51°15′45″N 2°37′29″W	A bowl barrow, which is 18 metres (59 ft) in diameter.	1008083	Upload Photo	
Bowl barrow 450 m southwest of Fernhill Farm	Priddy	Bowl barrow	Neolithic to Bronze Age	ST 52440 55251; 51°17′40″N 2°41′01″W	A bowl barrow, which is 23 metres (75 ft) in diameter.	1011523	Upload Photo	
Bowl barrow, 455 m west of Brimble Pit Pool	Westbury	Bowl barrow	Neolithic to Bronze Age	ST5033650796; 51°15′15″N 2°42′47″W	A bowl barrow, which is 11 metres (36 ft) in diameter.	1415590	Bowl barrow, 455 m west of Brimble Pit Pool	
Bowl barrow 460 m east of Charterhouse Warren Farm	Priddy	Bowl barrow	Neolithic to Bronze Age	ST 50438 54861; 51°17′27″N 2°42′44″W	A bowl barrow, which is 12 metres (39 ft) in diameter.	1010640	Upload Photo	
Bowl barrow 470 m south east of Southfield Farm	Priddy	Bowl barrow	Neolithic to Bronze Age	ST 55490 49795; 51°14′44″N 2°38′21″W	A bowl barrow, which is 18 metres (59 ft) in diameter.	1010263	Upload Photo	
Bowl barrow 490 m north west of Pen Hill Farm	St Cuthbert Out	Bowl barrow	Neolithic to Bronze Age	ST 55349 48418; 51°14′00″N 2°38′27″W	A bowl barrow, which is 14 metres (46 ft) in diameter.	1020206	Upload Photo	
Bowl barrow 500 m north of East Water	Priddy	Bowl barrow	Neolithic to Bronze Age	ST 53717 51462; 51°15′37″N 2°39′53″W	A bowl barrow, which is 13 metres (43 ft) in diameter.	1010637	Upload Photo	
Bowl barrow 510 m south east of Lodmore Farm	Priddy	Bowl barrow	Neolithic to Bronze Age	ST 53724 53754; 51°16′52″N 2°39′54″W	A bowl barrow, which is 19 metres (62 ft) in diameter.	1010427	Bowl barrow 510 m south east of Lodmore Farm	
Bowl barrow 520 m south-east of Red Quar Farm	Chewton Mendip	Bowl barrow	Neolithic to Bronze Age	ST 56551 51647; 51°15′44″N 2°37′27″W	A bowl barrow, which is 18 metres (59 ft) in diameter.	1008082	Upload Photo	
Bowl barrow, 540 m west of Brimble Pit Pool	Westbury	Bowl barrow	Neolithic to Bronze Age	ST5025750847; 51°15′17″N 2°42′51″W	A bowl barrow, which is 22 metres (72 ft) in diameter.	1415589	Upload Photo	
Bowl barrow 550 m south of Bristol Plain Farm: part of a linear round barrow cemetery	Rodney Stoke	Bowl barrow	Neolithic to Bronze Age	ST 50211 51421; 51°15′35″N 2°42′54″W	A bowl barrow, which is 12 metres (39 ft) in diameter.	1008090	Bowl barrow 550 m south of Bristol Plain Farm: part of a linear round barrow cemetery	
Bowl barrow 550 m southwest of Nordrach	Priddy	Bowl barrow	Neolithic to Bronze Age	ST 50788 55768; 51°17′56″N 2°42′26″W	A bowl barrow, which is 18 metres (59 ft) in diameter.	1011529	Upload Photo	
Bowl barrow 550 m south east of Southfield Farm	Priddy	Bowl barrow	Neolithic to Bronze Age	ST 55554 49741; 51°14′42″N 2°38′17″W	A bowl barrow, which is 18 metres (59 ft) in diameter.	1010264	Upload Photo	
Bowl barrow 550 m south east of Brimble Pit Pool: one of a group of round barrows north and east of Foxhills Wood	Westbury	Bowl barrow	Neolithic to Bronze Age	ST 51123 50363; 51°15′01″N 2°42′06″W	A bowl barrow, which is 13 metres (43 ft) in diameter.	1016293	Upload Photo	
Bowl barrow 570 m south east of Lodmore Farm	Priddy	Bowl barrow	Neolithic to Bronze Age	ST 53759 53653; 51°16′48″N 2°39′52″W	A bowl barrow which is 17 metres (56 ft) in diameter.	1010424	Upload Photo	
Bowl barrow 570 m south east of Southfield Farm	Priddy	Bowl barrow	Neolithic to Bronze Age	ST 55529 49654; 51°14′39″N 2°38′19″W	A bowl barrow, which is 15 metres (49 ft) in diameter.	1010231	Upload Photo	
Bowl barrow 570 m west of Newlands Farm	Chewton Mendip	Bowl barrow	Neolithic to Bronze Age	ST 57030 50530; 51°15′08″N 2°37′02″W	A bowl barrow, which is 30 metres (98 ft) in diameter.	1008093	Upload Photo	
Bowl barrow 590 m south-east of Charterhouse Warren Farm	Priddy	Bowl barrow	Neolithic to Bronze Age	ST 50581 54816; 51°17′25″N 2°42′36″W	A bowl barrow, which is 20 metres (66 ft) in diameter.	1008076	Upload Photo	
Bowl barrow 600 m east of Priddy Hill Farm	Priddy	Bowl barrow	Neolithic to Bronze Age	ST 52037 52814; 51°16′21″N 2°41′20″W	A bowl barrow, which is 22 metres (72 ft) in diameter.	1010521	Upload Photo	
Bowl barrow 600 m north of Rookham Plantation	Priddy	Bowl barrow	Neolithic to Bronze Age	ST 54538 49100; 51°14′21″N 2°39′09″W	A bowl barrow, which is 21 metres (69 ft) in diameter.	1009774	Upload Photo	
Bowl barrow 610 m northwest of Whitestown Farm	Priddy	Bowl barrow	Neolithic to Bronze Age	ST 52238 55261; 51°17′40″N 2°41′11″W	A bowl barrow, which is 30 metres (98 ft) in diameter.	1011536	Bowl barrow 610 m northwest of Whitestown Farm	
Bowl barrow 650 m northeast of Higher Pitts Farm	Priddy	Bowl barrow	Neolithic to Bronze Age	ST 54038 49468; 51°14′33″N 2°39′35″W	A bowl barrow, which is 16 metres (52 ft) in diameter.	1010649	Upload Photo	
Bowl barrow 700 m south of Bristol Plain Farm: part of a linear round barrow cemetery	Rodney Stoke	Bowl barrow	Neolithic to Bronze Age	ST 50305 51291; 51°15′31″N 2°42′49″W	A bowl barrow, which is 12 metres (39 ft) in diameter.	1008084	Upload Photo	
Bowl barrow 730 m southeast of Bristol Plain Farm	Priddy	Bowl barrow	Neolithic to Bronze Age	ST 50931 51694; 51°15′44″N 2°42′17″W	A bowl barrow, which is 18 metres (59 ft) in diameter.	1010490	Upload Photo	
Bowl barrow 750 m southwest of Dale Farm	Priddy	Bowl barrow	Neolithic to Bronze Age	ST 51939 50857; 51°15′17″N 2°41′24″W	A bowl barrow, which is 16 metres (52 ft) in diameter.	1008214	Upload Photo	
Bowl barrow 760 m southeast of Bristol Plain Farm	Priddy	Bowl barrow	Neolithic to Bronze Age	ST 50960 51676; 51°15′44″N 2°42′15″W	A bowl barrow, which is 13 metres (43 ft) in diameter.	1010492	Upload Photo	
Bowl barrow 770 m south of Townsend Farm	Priddy	Bowl barrow	Neolithic to Bronze Age	ST 51689 51152; 51°15′26″N 2°41′35″W	A bowl barrow, which is 15 metres (49 ft) in diameter.	1009743	Upload Photo	
Bowl barrow 800 m south of Townsend Farm	Priddy	Bowl barrow	Neolithic to Bronze Age	ST 51735 51113; 51°15′26″N 2°41′35″W	A bowl barrow, which is 16 metres (52 ft) in diameter.	1009740	Upload Photo	
Bowl barrow 810 m southeast of Bristol Plain Farm	Priddy	Bowl barrow	Neolithic to Bronze Age	ST 51003 51646; 51°15′42″N 2°42′13″W	A bowl barrow, which is 20 metres (66 ft) in diameter.	1010499	Upload Photo	
Bowl barrow 820 m south of Bristol Plain Farm: part of a linear round barrow cemetery	Rodney Stoke	Bowl barrow	Neolithic to Bronze Age	ST 50402 51182; 51°15′27″N 2°42′44″W	A bowl barrow, which is 17 metres (56 ft) in diameter.	1008089	Upload Photo	
Bowl barrow 850 m south of Bristol Plain Farm: part of a linear round barrow cemetery	Westbury	Bowl barrow	Neolithic to Bronze Age	ST 50448 51142; 51°15′26″N 2°42′41″W	A bowl barrow, which is 10 metres (33 ft) in diameter.	1008085	Upload Photo	
Bowl barrow 850 m south of Townsend Farm	Priddy	Bowl barrow	Neolithic to Bronze Age	ST 51808 51046; 51°15′23″N 2°41′31″W	A bowl barrow, which is 17 metres (56 ft) in diameter.	1009741	Upload Photo	
Bowl barrow 850 m southeast of Bristol Plain Farm	Priddy	Bowl barrow	Neolithic to Bronze Age	ST 51036 51629; 51°15′42″N 2°42′11″W	A bowl barrow, which is 15 metres (49 ft) in diameter.	1010502	Upload Photo	
Bowl barrow 870 m southwest of Charterhouse Warren Farm	Priddy	Bowl barrow	Neolithic to Bronze Age	ST 49221 54528; 51°17′15″N 2°43′46″W	A bowl barrow, which is 16 metres (52 ft) in diameter.	1010642	Upload Photo	
Bowl barrow 870 m southwest of Dale Farm	Priddy	Bowl barrow	Neolithic to Bronze Age	ST 51701 50931; 51°15′20″N 2°41′37″W	A bowl barrow, which is 26 metres (85 ft) in diameter.	1008217	Upload Photo	
Bowl barrow 900 m south west of Bristol Plain Farm: part of a group of round barrows south and south west of Bristol Plain Farm	Rodney Stoke	Bowl barrow	Neolithic to Bronze Age	ST 49593 51435; 51°15′35″N 2°43′26″W	A bowl barrow, which is 21 metres (69 ft) in diameter.	1008784	Upload Photo	
Bowl barrow in the garden of Beechbarrow	St Cuthbert Out	Bowl barrow	Neolithic to Bronze Age	ST 57071 48924; 51°14′16″N 2°36′59″W	A bowl barrow, which is 20 metres (66 ft) in diameter.	1020019	Upload Photo	
Bowl barrow on Stock Hill: part of the Stock Hill round barrow cemetery	Chewton Mendip	Bowl barrow	Neolithic to Bronze Age	ST 55679 50914; 51°15′21″N 2°38′11″W	A bowl barrow, which is 12.5 metres (41 ft) in diameter.	1014239	Bowl barrow on Stock Hill: part of the Stock Hill round barrow cemetery	
Bracelet Cave	St Cuthbert Out	Cave	Palaeolithic	ST 52283 48340; 51°13′56″N 2°41′05″W	A cave from which nine human skeletons have been uncovered, probably from the Bronze Age. Roman artefacts have also been identified.	1012062	Upload Photo	
Browne's Gate	Wells	Gateway	1451	ST5494445852; 51°12′36″N 2°38′47″W	Brown's Gatehouse (also known as the Dean's Eye) is an entrance gateway into a walled precinct, the Liberty of St Andrew, which encloses the twelfth century Cathedral, the Bishop's Palace, Vicar's Close and the residences of the clergy who serve the cathedral. The Brown's Gatehouse was built around 1451, by Bishop Thomas Beckington (also spelt Beckyngton), and provides the entrance to the Bishop's Place from Sadler Street. It is named after the shoemaker Richard Brown, who was the next door tenant in 1553. It is a two-storey building of Doulting ashlar stone, with a Welsh slate roof with coped gables behind parapets.	1006198	Browne's Gate More images	
Brownes' Hole	Stoke St Michael	Cave	Palaeolithic	ST 66928 47558; 51°13′34″N 2°28′30″W	An extensive cave system believed to contain archaeological artefacts.	1010709	Upload Photo	
Burial chamber (remains of), Murtry Hill, Orchardleigh Park	Buckland Dinham	Chamber tomb	Neolithic	ST 76297 50667; 51°15′17″N 2°20′28″W	A probable burial chamber which was excavated in 1803 and 1804 when human bones and cremation urns were discovered.	1006174	Burial chamber (remains of), Murtry Hill, Orchardleigh Park More images	
Camp 600 yd (548 m) E of Charterhouse	Priddy	Hillfort	Iron Age and Romano-British	ST 50405 55783; 51°15′17″N 2°20′28″W	Charterhouse Camp is a univallate Iron Age hill fort. It is situated approximately 0.97 kilometres (0.6 mi) east from the village of Charterhouse. There is some evidence, in the form of burials in local caves, of human occupation since the late Neolithic times and the early Bronze Age. The site is associated with Charterhouse Roman Town and may have been the site of Iscalis.	1006195	Upload Photo	
Central of three duck decoys on Walton Moor, south of Lord Bath's Drove	Walton	Duck decoy	19th century	ST 45747 33772; 51°06′03″N 2°46′34″W	An island within a square pool which was supplied by four "pipes". Used as a duck decoy	1014449	Upload Photo	
Charterhouse lead works	Priddy	Lead mine	Romano-British	ST 49586 55184; 51°17′37″N 2°43′28″W	The lead and silver mines at Charterhouse, were first operated on a large scale by the Romans, from at least A.D. 49. At first the lead/silver industries were tightly controlled by the Roman military, but within a short time the extraction of these metals was contracted out to civilian companies, probably because the silver content of the local ore was not particularly high.	1006127	Charterhouse lead works	
Circular earthwork and barrows on Beacon Hill	Doulting	Earthworks	Neolithic	ST 63842 45913; 51°12′41″N 2°31′08″W	Three bowl barrows.	1006199	Upload Photo	
Deserted medieval hamlet E of Draycott	Rodney Stoke	Earthworks	Middle Ages	ST 48876 51586; 51°15′40″N 2°44′03″W	A small medieval farmstead including the foundations of a building, and the surrounding field system.	1006122	Upload Photo	
Deserted medieval farmstead and field system NW of Ebbor Wood	Priddy	Earthworks	Middle Ages	ST 51510 49353; 51°14′29″N 2°41′46″W	The site of medieval farmsteads. The more recent was built around 1788 and was ruined by 1886.	1006138	Upload Photo	
Deserted medieval site SW of Tytherington Bridge	Selwood	Earthworks	Middle Ages	ST 76981 44781; 51°12′06″N 2°19′51″W	A deserted medieval village.	1006123	Upload Photo	
Deserted medieval site W of Lower Batch Farm	Lamyatt	Earthworks	Middle Ages	ST 65117 35944; 51°07′18″N 2°29′59″W	Earthworks from a deserted medieval village.	1003749	Upload Photo	
Disc barrow 610 m northeast of Drove Cottage	Priddy	Disc barrow	Bronze Age	ST 55910 50083; 51°14′54″N 2°37′59″W	A disc barrow which is 18 metres (59 ft) in diameter.	1009746	Upload Photo	
Dovecote 220 m north of St Philip and St James's Church	Norton St Philip	Dovecote	15th century	ST 77130 55926; 51°18′07″N 2°19′46″W	A 15th century Doulting stone dovecote containing approximately 660 nesting boxes.	1019896	Upload Photo	
Drying house at The Coach House, Willow Vale	Frome	Drying house	18th or 19th century	ST 77896 48142; 51°13′55″N 2°19′05″W	A circular stone building, about 5 metres (16 ft) in diameter used for drying cloth from the local woolen industry.	1016955	Upload Photo	
Duck decoy 1 km south east of Manor Farm	Godney	Duck decoy	Before 1736	ST 47776 41530; 51°10′14″N 2°44′54″W	A duck decoy which survives as waterlogged hollows up to 50 metres (160 ft) in length.	1014442	Upload Photo	
Duck decoy, 590 m south west of Rice Farm	Sharpham	Duck decoy	?	ST 46779 40362; 51°09′36″N 2°45′45″W	The site of a four pipe duck decoy with two small islands in a square pool. The site was dredged in 1984 and 1985 and still attracts water fowl.	1014447	Upload Photo	
Duck decoy, 820 m SSW of Little Huckham Farm: the western of three decoys on Walton Moor	Walton	Duck decoy	1823	ST 44731 34328; 51°06′20″N 2°47′27″W	A duck decoy which survives as an oval pool.	1014448	Upload Photo	
Duck decoy, 950 m south west of junction of Westhay Moor Drove and Lewis's Drove	Meare	Duck decoy	Before 1736	ST 45807 43087; 51°11′04″N 2°46′36″W	A six pipe duck decoy from which a rectangular pool area can be seen.	1014435	Upload Photo	
Duck decoy east of Barrow Wood Lane	Westbury	Duck decoy	Late 18th or early 19th century	ST 47869 48501; 51°14′00″N 2°44′53″W	A duck decoy with a complex arrangement of ditches and channels, probably used from the late 18th or early 19th century but out of use by 1840.	1014453	Upload Photo	
Duck decoy in Sharpham Park, 600 m south west of Avalon Farm	Sharpham	Duck decoy	?	ST 46326 38220; 51°08′27″N 2°46′07″W	The site of a four pipe duck decoy with an oval pool approximately 40 metres (130 ft) long with an oval island. The site was dredged in 1985 and still attracts water fowl.	1014450	Upload Photo	
Early Christian settlement and monastic site at Marchey Farm	Wookey	Earthworks	Romano-British to Middle Ages	ST 47960 46211; 51°12′46″N 2°44′47″W	Earthworks from a Christian settlement which was also occupied during the Roman period and Middle Ages. The remains of a rectangular building which is thought to have been a chapel have been identified surrounded by a bank and ditch. The site which was known as Martinsey or Martin's Island and was connected with Glastonbury Abbey.	1011266	Upload Photo	
Earthwork N of Stubbs Wood, Merehead	Wanstrow	Earthworks	Roman or Iron Age	ST 69561 43681; 51°11′29″N 2°26′13″W	An earthwork bank and ditch which may related to a promontory hill fort.	1006150	Upload Photo	
Earthworks S of Tadhill Farm	Downhead	Earthworks	Iron Age	ST 67634 45810; 51°12′38″N 2°27′53″W	A possible camp, cattle enclosure or homestead which may have been occupied during the Iron Age.	1006169	Upload Photo	
Farleigh Hungerford Castle	Farleigh Hungerford	Castle	14th century	ST8007957661; 51°19′04″N 2°17′14″W	Farleigh Hungerford Castle was built in two phases: the inner court was constructed between 1377 and 1383 by Sir Thomas Hungerford. His son, Sir Walter Hungerford, extended the castle with an additional, outer court, enclosing the parish church in the process. In the English Civil War in 1642, the castle was seized by Royalist forces in 1643, but recaptured by Parliament without a fight near the end of the conflict in 1645. By the 18th century the castle fell into disrepair; in 1730 it was bought by the Houlton family, when much of it was broken up for salvage. In the 1915 Farleigh Hungerford Castle was sold to the Office of Works and a restoration programme began. It is now owned by English Heritage, who operate it as a tourist attraction.	1015871	Farleigh Hungerford Castle More images	
Fenny Castle: a motte and bailey castle	Wookey	Motte-and-bailey castle	Middle Ages	ST 50767 43585; 51°11′22″N 2°42′19″W	Fenny Castle is the remains of a motte and bailey castle sited on a natural hillock of Lias approximately 20 metres (66 ft) above the surrounding flat land on the edge of the Somerset Levels. Little remains of the stonework, and there is evidence of extensive quarrying. The mound is now covered in grass and scrub with a few trees.	1015496	Fenny Castle: a motte and bailey castle	
Fenny Castle Cross: a medieval wayside cross 20 m north west of Castle Farm, Castle	Wookey	Cross	14th century	ST 50838 44078; 51°11′38″N 2°42′18″W	The remains of a wayside cross with three square steps.	1015797	Fenny Castle Cross: a medieval wayside cross 20 m north west of Castle Farm, Castle	
Five bowl barrows 500 m north west of Cuckoo Cleeves: part of the Stock Hill round barrow cemetery	Chewton Mendip	Bowl barrow	Bronze Age	ST 55708 50973; 51°15′22″N 2°38′10″W	Five bowl barrows which range from 10 metres (33 ft) to 27 metres (89 ft) in diameter.	1014775	Upload Photo	
Four round barrows SE of Miners' Arms Inn, Chewton Rabbit Warren	Chewton Mendip	Round barrow	Bronze Age	ST 54612 51688; 51°15′45″N 2°39′06″W	A group of round barrows.	1006215	Upload Photo	
Fussell's Lower Works: an iron edge tool works, 210 m south east of Wadbury	Mells	Iron works	1740s	ST 73903 48879; 51°14′16″N 2°22′36″W	The Old Iron Works is a 0.25 hectare biological Site of Special Scientific Interest. The site is a ruined iron works, which mainly produced agricultural edge-tools which were exported all over the world, and is now, in addition to its unique and major importance in relation to industrial archaeology, used as a breeding site by horseshoe bats. It is included in the Heritage at Risk Register produced by Historic England.	1019796	Fussell's Lower Works: an iron edge tool works, 210 m south east of Wadbury	
Glastonbury Abbey	Glastonbury	Abbey	pre Norman Conquest	ST5005838781; 51°08′46″N 2°42′55″W	Glastonbury Abbey was a monastery founded in the 7th century and enlarged in the 10th, before a major fire in 1184 destroyed the buildings. It was rebuilt and by the 14th century was one of the richest and most powerful monasteries in England. The abbey was suppressed during the Dissolution of the Monasteries under King Henry VIII of England. The last abbot, Richard Whiting (Whyting), was hanged, drawn and quartered as a traitor on Glastonbury Tor in 1539. From at least the 12th century the Glastonbury area was frequently associated with the legend of King Arthur, a connection promoted by medieval monks who asserted that Glastonbury was Avalon. Christian legends have also claimed that the abbey was founded by Joseph of Arimathea in the 1st century. The ruins of Glastonbury Abbey were purchased by the Bath and Wells Diocesan Trust in 1908 and are now the property of and managed by the Glastonbury Abbey trust.	1021077	Glastonbury Abbey More images	
Glastonbury Lake Village	near Godney	Crannog	Iron Age	ST 49286 40757; 51°09′49″N 2°43′33″W	Glastonbury Lake Village was an Iron Age village on a 'crannog' or man made island in the Somerset Levels. It has been described as "the best preserved prehistoric village ever found in the United Kingdom". The site covered an area of 122 metres (400 ft) north to south by 91 metres (300 ft) east to west. It was first constructed 250 B.C. by laying down timber and clay. Wooden houses and barns were then built on the clay base and occupied by up to 200 people at any time until the village was abandoned around 50 B.C.	1006156	Glastonbury Lake Village More images	
Group of round barrows 750 m north west of Ivy Cottage	St Cuthbert Out	Round barrow	Neolithic to Bronze Age	ST 54217 48700; 51°14′08″N 2°39′26″W	Four round barrows which range from 10 metres (33 ft) to 23 metres (75 ft) in diameter.	1020494	Upload Photo	
Group of seven round barrows 380 m east of East Water Drove (Part of Priddy Nine Barrows Cemetery)	Priddy	Round barrows	Bronze Age	ST 53911 52055; 51°15′46″N 2°39′45″W	Priddy Nine Barrows and Ashen Hill Barrow Cemeteries are a collection of round barrows, dating from the Bronze Age. The barrows sit on crests of land at either end of a field in an area of the Mendip Hills with several Neolithic remains. They are assumed to be related to the Priddy Circles which lie 750 metres (2,460 ft) to the north. Ashen Hill consists of six bowl barrows and two bell barrows aligned east to west while Priddy Nine Barrows divided into one group of seven round barrows and another pair slightly separated from the others. Excavations in 1815 uncovered cremation burials and grave goods. A geophysical magnetometry survey suggested that there may have been three further barrows.	1010506	Group of seven round barrows 380 m east of East Water Drove (Part of Priddy Nine Barrows Cemetery)	
Group of three bowl barrows and one long barrow 90 m northeast of Barrow House Farm	Chewton Mendip	Bowl barrow	Neolithic to Bronze Age	ST 60096 53286; 51°16′38″N 2°34′25″W	Three bowl barrows and a long barrow which vary between 18 metres (59 ft) and 24 metres (79 ft) in diameter.	1011528	Upload Photo	
Hales Castle: a ringwork and associated earthworks on Coles Hill	Frome	Motte-and-bailey castle	Middle Ages	ST 79748 44223; 51°11′50″N 2°17′28″W	Hales Castle was a medieval castle was built, probably in the years immediately after the Norman conquest of England in 1066. The circular ringwork is 37 metres (120 ft) in diameter and stands on the northern slope of Roddenbury Hill, close to the Iron Age Roddenbury Hillfort. It comprises banks and outer ditches and has an unfinished bailey.	1008805	Hales Castle: a ringwork and associated earthworks on Coles Hill More images	
Henge 370 m north east of Drove Cottage	Priddy	Henge	Neolithic	ST 55915 49786; 51°14′45″N 2°38′00″W	Drove Cottage Henge is situated in a valley. The bank circumscribing the henge is about 11.5 metres (38 ft) thick and 0.4 metres (1.3 ft) high, with a diameter of around 54 metres (177 ft) when measuring from the outsides of the banks. Just inside this bank is a ditch 6 metres (20 ft) wide and 0.3 metres (0.98 ft) deep, enclosing a circular central area about 19 metres (62 ft) in diameter. In the northern portion of this central area is a low-lying mound in front of the exit, which appears as a break in the outside bank.	1015795	Upload Photo	
Hillfort at Fox Covert, 550 m north east of Lamyatt Lodge	Lamyatt	Earthworks	Iron Age	ST 66610 36648; 51°07′41″N 2°28′43″W	An early Iron Age earthwork, probably a stock enclosure but known as Fox Covert, occupies 3.25 hectares (8.0 acres) on a spur of Creech Hill overlooking the River Alham valley.	1016303	Upload Photo	
Hillfort on Roddenbury Hill	Selwood	Hill fort	Iron Age	ST 79782 43925; 51°11′42″N 2°17′28″W	Roddenbury Hillfort is a univallate Iron Age hillfort. The site covers 0.84 hectares (2.1 acres). It some places the protective bank has been destroyed in others it remains up to 1.6 metres (5.2 ft) high and has a 1.8 metres (5.9 ft) ditch below it.	1008804	Hillfort on Roddenbury Hill	
Kingsdown camp, Mells Down	Buckland Dinham	Univallate hill fort	Iron Age	ST 71837 51733; 51°15′51″N 2°24′12″W	Kingsdown Camp is an Iron Age hill fort. It is a univallate fort with an area of 0.15 hectares (0.37 acres), and is approximately quadrilateral in shape. In the Iron Age or Roman period a drystone wall was constructed, possibly 4 metres (13 ft) high and 2.5 metres (8 ft) wide. There is an entrance on the northeast side. The fort continued to be used by the Romans.	1006219	Upload Photo	
King's Castle enclosures, Iron Age defended settlement	St Cuthbert Out	Hill fort	Iron Age	ST 56882 45641; 51°12′30″N 2°37′09″W	King's Castle is an Iron Age enclosed hilltop settlement at the south-western edge of the Mendip Hills. It consists of two or three interlinked sub-enclosures, with what appears to be a field system extending to the east; an unusual layout, the site remains relatively little studied and has not been archaeologically excavated. It is a scheduled monument, and shares its name with the surrounding King's Castle Wood—today a Somerset Wildlife Trust nature reserve—though this name is probably a modern invention.	1008807	Upload Photo	
Lake villages NW of Oxenpill	Meare	Crannog	Iron Age	ST 44388 42200; 51°10′35″N 2°47′44″W	Meare Lake Village is the site of an Iron Age settlement on the Somerset Levels. In prehistoric times there were two villages situated within the now-drained Meare Pool, occupied at different times between 300 B.C. and 100 AD. The villages were built on a morass on an artificial foundation of timber filled with brushwood, bracken, rubble and clay.	1006160	Upload Photo	
Lime Kiln Hill Quarry Cave	Mells	Cave	Palaeolithic	ST 73062 48659; 51°14′11″N 2°23′14″W	A cave from which Pleistocene faunal remains and a Middle Palaeolithic chert hand axe have been recovered.	1012068	Upload Photo	
Linear barrow cemetery comprising six bowl barrows 510 m south west of Townsend Farm	Priddy	Bowl barrow	Bronze Age	ST 51528 51658; 51°15′43″N 2°41′46″W	Six bowl barrows in a line. Each is between 10 metres (33 ft) and 23 metres (75 ft) in diameter.	1009744	Upload Photo	
Linear earthwork in Butleigh Wood	Butleigh	Earthworks	Iron Age or Middle Ages	ST 50396 33139; 51°05′43″N 2°42′35″W	The New Ditch is a linear earthwork of possible Iron Age or Medieval construction. Its construction is similar to Ponter's Ball Dyke 4.8 kilometres (3 mi) to the northeast, with the dyke on the south east of the embankment, but of less massive construction. Both were probably part of a more extensive defence scheme. It is nearly 0.8 kilometres (0.5 mi) in length and was probably of greater extent originally, but as it stands, New Ditch cannot be termed a cross-ridge dyke although it does seem to be a boundary work. It is debatable whether this site is ancient because it is located close to a medieval woodland and a deer park.	1006152	Linear earthwork in Butleigh Wood	
Long barrow 180 m north of Lime House	Chewton Mendip	Long barrow	Neolithic	ST 60095 53061; 51°16′31″N 2°34′25″W	A long barrow which is 48 metres (157 ft) long and 27 metres (89 ft) wide.	1011526	Upload Photo	
Long barrow 230 m east of Chewton Plot	Chewton Mendip	Long barrow	Neolithic	ST 61113 52907; 51°16′26″N 2°33′32″W	A long barrow which is 28 metres (92 ft) long and 12 metres (39 ft) wide	1011524	Upload Photo	
Long barrow 370 m south-south-east of Castle Farm	Chewton Mendip	Long barrow	Neolithic	ST 54519 52548; 51°16′13″N 2°39′12″W	A long barrow which is 30 metres (98 ft) long and 14 metres (46 ft) wide.	1011525	Upload Photo	
Long barrow and bowl barrow 430 m north west of the Mendip Nature Research Station	St Cuthbert Out	Long barrow and bowl barrow	Neolithic	ST 58589 49575; 51°14′38″N 2°35′41″W	A long barrow which is 29 metres (95 ft) long and 12 metres (39 ft) wide and a bowl barrow which is 11 metres (36 ft) in diameter.	1020548	Upload Photo	
Long barrow 600 m east north east of Brimble Pit Pool	Priddy	Long barrow	Neolithic	ST 51412 50909; 51°15′19″N 2°41′51″W	A long barrow which is 30 metres (98 ft) long and 11 metres (36 ft) wide.	1010389	Upload Photo	
Long barrow, round barrow and cairn on Pen Hill	St Cuthbert Out	Long barrow	Neolithic	ST 56348 48679; 51°14′08″N 2°37′36″W	A long barrow which is 44 metres (144 ft) long and 13 metres (43 ft) wide, a round barrow and a cairn.	1020018	Upload Photo	
Maesbury Castle small multivallate hillfort	Croscombe	Hill fort	Iron Age	ST 60994 47168; 51°13′20″N 2°33′35″W	Maesbury Castle is an Iron Age hill fort. The enclosure has an area of 2.5 hectares (6.2 acres), and lies at a height of 292 metres (958 ft). The fort has a single rampart up to 6 metres (20 ft) high, with an outer ditch (univallate). Entrances are to the south-east and north-east (with possible outworks).	1015494	Maesbury Castle small multivallate hillfort More images	
Market cross in the market place	Shepton Mallet	Market cross	16th century	ST 61887 43652; 51°11′27″N 2°32′48″W	The hexagonal market cross was built in the early 16th century. The central column is surrounded by six segmental arches which were added around 1700. Six rebels from the Monmouth Rebellion were executed at the site in 1685.	1019974	Market cross in the market place More images	
Marston Moat	Trudoxhill	Earthwork	12th century	ST 76753 43814; 51°11′43″N 2°20′24″W	Marston Moat is the site of a fortified manor house built before 1195. The 7.0 metres (23 ft) wide moat which measures 33 metres (108 ft) by 57 metres (188 ft) has a 3.0 metres (10 ft) wide and 0.30 metres (1 ft) high bank on its south and east sides.	1016302	Upload Photo	
Medieval and post-medieval coal mining remains in Harridge Wood and Edford Wood South	Ashwick	Earthworks	Middle Ages	ST 65397 48181; 51°13′54″N 2°29′49″W	Earthworks including mounds, spoil tips and bell pits from coal mining which continued at the site until the 17th or 18th century.	1019023	Upload Photo	
Medieval coal mining remains immediately south of Benter Cross	Ashwick	Earthworks	Middle Ages	ST 64823 48884; 51°14′17″N 2°30′19″W	Earthworks including spoil mounds and shafts from coal mining in the medieval period which may have start as early as the Roman occupation of Britain.	1019022	Upload Photo	
Medieval wayside cross at Bodden	Doulting	Cross	Middle Ages	ST 63977 44050; 51°11′40″N 2°31′01″W	A square base with the 0.4 metres (1 ft 4 in) remains of the shaft of a cross.	1015798	Upload Photo	
Medieval farmstead, E of Butleigh Wood	Butleigh	Earthworks	Middle Ages	ST 50674 33451; 51°05′54″N 2°42′21″W	Earthworks from a deserted medieval settlement.	1006132	Upload Photo	
Medieval standing cross 50 m west of St Peter's Church	Evercreech	Market cross	15th century	ST 64891 38681; 51°08′47″N 2°30′12″W	The market cross stands on four steps and a 3 metres (9.8 ft) high shaft. In the 19th century the cruciform head was restored.	1016232	Medieval standing cross 50 m west of St Peter's Church	
Medieval standing cross 80 m south of St Mary's Church	Croscombe	Cross	14th century	ST5904144349; 51°11′49″N 2°35′15″W	An octagonal base of three steps supports the shaft of the cross. The lower 0.3 metres (1 ft 0 in) of the shaft is original. The upper part is more recent.	1015796	Medieval standing cross 80 m south of St Mary's Church	
Moated manor house site, Spargrove Farm	Batcombe	Earthwork	Middle Ages	ST 67044 37918; 51°08′23″N 2°28′21″W	Earthwork remains of a deserted medieval village surrounded by a moat. It was deserted in the 16th century.	1006151	Upload Photo	
Murtry Old Bridge	Buckland Dinham	Bridge	15th century	ST 76436 49915; 51°14′52″N 2°20′20″W	A stone arch bridge. Two of the arches are original the other has been replaced.	1006176	Upload Photo	
Nunney Castle	Nunney	Castle	14th century	ST 73671 45731; 51°12′37″N 2°22′43″W	Nunney Castle was built in the late 14th century by Sir John Delamare on the profits of his involvement in the Hundred Years' War, the moated castle's architectural style, possibly influenced by the design of French castles, has provoked considerable academic debate. Remodelled during the late 16th century, Nunney Castle was damaged during the English Civil War and is now ruined. The architectural historian Nikolaus Pevsner has described Nunney as "aesthetically the most impressive castle in Somerset."	1014716	Nunney Castle More images	
Outlook Cave	Ebbor Gorge	Cave	Neolithic	ST 52464 48644; 51°14′06″N 2°40′56″W	Human and animal bones from the Neolithic were recovered from the cave in 1907.	1010711	Upload Photo	
Pair of bowl barrows 350 m NNE of Whitnell Corner	Emborough	Bowl barrow	Neolithic to Bronze Age	ST 59818 49081; 51°14′22″N 2°34′37″W	Two bowl barrows, one of which is 30 metres (98 ft) in diameter and the other 18 metres (59 ft).	1008081	Pair of bowl barrows 350 m NNE of Whitnell Corner	
Pair of bowl barrows 405 m east of East Water Drove (Part of Priddy Nine Barrows Cemetery)	Chewton Mendip	Bowl barrow	Bronze Age	ST 53866 51730; 51°15′46″N 2°39′45″W	Priddy Nine Barrows and Ashen Hill Barrow Cemeteries include two bowl barrows which are separated from the others. Similarly to the other seven they are around 20 metres (66 ft) in diameter and rise to between 2.5 metres (8 ft 2 in) and 3 metres (9.8 ft) high.	1010503	Pair of bowl barrows 405 m east of East Water Drove (Part of Priddy Nine Barrows Cemetery)	
Pair of bowl barrows 640 m south of Bristol Plain Farm: part of a linear round barrow cemetery	Rodney Stoke	Bowl barrow	Neolithic to Bronze Age	ST 50252 51353; 51°15′33″N 2°42′51″W	Two bowl barrows, one of which is 19 metres (62 ft) in diameter and the other 20 metres (66 ft).	1008091	Upload Photo	
Part of the Hospital of St Mary Magdalene, Magdalene Street	Glastonbury	Almshouses	1444	ST 49885 38659; 51°08′42″N 2°43′04″W	In the 1070s St Margaret's Chapel was built on Magdelene Street, originally as a hospital and later as almshouses for the poor. The building dates from 1444. The roof of the hall is thought to have been removed after the Dissolution, and some of the building was demolished in the 1960s. It is Grade II* listed, and a scheduled monument. In 2010 plans were announced to restore the building.	1020789	Part of the Hospital of St Mary Magdalene, Magdalene Street	
Ponter's Ball linear earthwork	Glastonbury	Dyke	Possibly 3rd century B.C. or post-Roman	ST 53200 37632; 51°08′17″N 2°40′06″W	Ponter's Ball Dyke is a linear earthwork. It consists of an embankment with a ditch on the east side. The current visible remains extend to just over 1 kilometre (0.62 mi). Interpretation of the site is not clear. It is possible that it was part of a longer defensive barrier associated with New Ditch three miles to the south-west which is built in a similar manner. It has been suggested that it is part of a great Celtic sanctuary, probably 3rd century B.C., while others date it to the post-Roman period and connect it with the Dark Age occupation on Glastonbury Tor. The 1970 excavation suggests the 12th century or later.	1006154	Ponter's Ball linear earthwork	
Priddy Circle and barrow cemetery 400 m north of Castle of Comfort Inn	Priddy	Earthwork enclosures	Neolithic	ST 54011 52781; 51°16′21″N 2°39′39″W	Priddy Circles are a linear arrangement of four circular earthwork enclosures. They are described as 'probable Neolithic ritual or ceremonial monuments similar to a henge'.	1015501	Upload Photo	
Priddy Glebe Barrow: a bowl barrow 25 m north of St. Lawrence's Church	Priddy	Bowl barrow	Neolithic to Bronze Age	ST 52817 51415; 51°15′36″N 2°40′39″W	A bowl barrow which is 25 metres (82 ft) in diameter.	1009765	Upload Photo	
Rhinoceros Hole, Wookey	St Cuthbert Out	Cave	Paleolithic	ST 53238 47930; 51°13′43″N 2°40′16″W	A collapsed rock shelter which was used by humans between 100,000 and 40,000 years ago.	1010292	Upload Photo	
Rode Bridge	Rode	Bridge	c. 1777	ST 80237 54309; 51°17′15″N 2°17′05″W	A stone two-arch bridge over the River Frome.	1006180	Rode Bridge	
Roman amphitheatre 1/2 mile (800 m) N of Charterhouse	Charterhouse	Amphitheatre	Romano-British	ST 49887 56506; 51°18′20″N 2°43′13″W	The amphitheatre stood west of Charterhouse Roman Town. It is the only one in England to exist at a lead mine. It measures 32 metres (105 ft) by 24.4 metres (80 ft) and the banks for the seating survive 4.5 metres (15 ft) above the arena. It was probably a place of entertainment for the soldiers at the Roman fort which was established here.	1006193	Upload Photo	
Roman building 270 m north east of Priddy church	Priddy	Earthwork	Romano-British	ST 53095 51461; 51°15′37″N 2°40′25″W	The site of as Roman building. Artefacts from the 1st to 3rd centuries have been uncovered.	1015497	Upload Photo	
Roman building 600 yd (549 m) SW of Lower Sutton Farm	Ditcheat	Earthwork	Romano-British	ST 61784 33297; 51°05′52″N 2°32′50″W	Earthworks from a Roman settlement. Pottery from the 3rd and 4th centuries has been uncovered.	1002956	Upload Photo	
Roman building at Lamyatt Beacon, Creech Hill	Lamyatt	Earthwork	Romano-British	ST 67009 36213; 51°07′27″N 2°28′22″W	Lamyatt Beacon marks the highest area of Creech Hill. It is the site of a Romano-Celtic temple, which was in use from 250 A.D. to 375 A.D.	1003748	Upload Photo	
Roman settlement at Town Field	Priddy	Earthwork	Romano-British	ST 50112 56275; 51°18′12″N 2°43′01″W	Charterhouse Roman Town grew up around the north-western edge of prehistoric lead and silver mines, which were exploited by the Romans. Extraction is thought to have begun as early as 49 A.D. and continued until at least the 4th century.	1006194	Upload Photo	
Romano-British settlement on Stoke Moor	Rodney Stoke	Earthwork	Romano-British	ST 45999 48984; 51°14′15″N 2°46′30″W	Earthworks from a 18.5 hectares (46 acres) Roman settlement. Coins and pottery from the 1st to 3rd centuries have been uncovered.	1011125	Upload Photo	
Roman villa complex, 330 m south-west of St Algar's Farm	Selwood	Roman villa	Romano-British	ST7832341854; 51°10′32″N 2°18′41″W	Earthworks from a Roman villa surrounded by an enclosure with a ditch surrounding 100 square metres (1,100 sq ft) from which a large number of artefacts have been recovered.	1006153	Upload Photo	
Roman villa NW of Port Way	Hemington	Roman villa	Romano-British	ST 76283 53104; 51°16′36″N 2°20′29″W	Earthworks from a Roman villa.	1006140	Upload Photo	
Roman villa NW of Two Acre Plantation	Street	Roman villa	Romano-British	ST 48882 34624; 51°06′31″N 2°43′54″W	Earthworks from a Roman villa.	1006182	Upload Photo	
Round barrow cemetery 470 m and 400 m north of Pen Hill Farm	St Cuthbert Out	Round barrow	Bronze Age	ST 55718 48611; 51°14′06″N 2°38′08″W	A round barrow cemetery consisting of five bowl barrows and two cairns.	1020207	Upload Photo	
Round barrow 1435 m SE of Miners' Arms Inn	Chewton Mendip	Round barrow	Bronze Age	ST 55633 51528; 51°15′40″N 2°38′14″W	A mound which may be a barrow or a spoil heap.	1006216	Upload Photo	
Round barrow in Beacon Plantation	Doulting	Round barrow	Bronze Age	ST 64093 45873; 51°12′39″N 2°30′54″W	A group of six round barrows.	1006178	Upload Photo	
Round barrow on Beacon Hill	Ashwick	Round barrow	Bronze Age	ST 63564 46118; 51°12′47″N 2°31′23″W	Three round barrows.	1003030	Round barrow on Beacon Hill	
Round barrows in and near Wright's Piece	Priddy	Round barrow	Bronze Age	ST 52550 54693; 51°17′22″N 2°40′54″W	A collection of round barrows.	1006218	Round barrows in and near Wright's Piece	
Round barrows SW of Cleeve's Plantation	Chewton Mendip	Round barrow	Bronze Age	ST 56255 50731; 51°15′15″N 2°37′42″W	A probable bowl barrow.	1003027	Upload Photo	
Rowberrow: a bowl barrow 40 m north of Hill View	Priddy	Bowl barrow	Bronze Age	ST 52248 52340; 51°16′06″N 2°41′09″W	A bowl barrow which is 22 metres (72 ft) in diameter.	1010391	Upload Photo	
Savory's Hole	St Cuthbert Out	Cave	Palaeolithic	ST 52863 48811; 51°14′11″N 2°40′36″W	A cave in Ebbor Gorge from which human bones have been recovered.	1012061	Upload Photo	
Section of medieval road, south of Pomparles Bridge, north of Street	Street	Road	Middle Ages	ST 48672 37514; 51°08′05″N 2°44′06″W	The site of a medieval road.	1014443	Upload Photo	
Section of the Abbot's Way trackway, 500 m WSW of Honeygar Farm	Meare	Timber trackway	Neolithic	ST 41979 42583; 51°10′46″N 2°49′53″W	The site of the preserved remains of the Abbot's Way a corduroy timber trackway which was built between 2630 and 2280 B.C.	1014432	Upload Photo	
Sections of the Sweet Track and Post Track, 240 m south west of Sunnyside Farm	Meare	Timber trackway	3807 or 3806 B.C.	ST 42865 41721; 51°10′19″N 2°49′07″W	A section of the Sweet Track, an ancient causeway built in either 3807 or 3806 B.C. and the earlier structure, the Post Track. Construction was of crossed wooden poles, driven into the waterlogged soil to support a walkway that consisted mainly of planks of oak, laid end-to-end. The track was only used for a period of around 10 years and was then abandoned, probably due to rising water levels.	1014440	Upload Photo	
Sections of the Sweet Track and Post Track, 250 m ESE of Station House	Meare	Timber trackway	3807 or 3806 B.C.	ST 42590 41139; 51°10′00″N 2°49′21″W	A section of the Sweet Track, an ancient causeway built in either 3807 or 3806 B.C. and the earlier structure, the Post Track. Construction was of crossed wooden poles, driven into the waterlogged soil to support a walkway that consisted mainly of planks of oak, laid end-to-end. The track was only used for a period of around 10 years and was then abandoned, probably due to rising water levels.	1014831	Upload Photo	
Small Down Knoll camp	Evercreech	Hill fort	Bronze Age	ST 66623 40624; 51°09′51″N 2°28′49″W	Small Down Knoll, or Small Down Camp, is a Bronze Age hill fort. Finds of flints indicate a prehistoric Mesolithic occupation. The fort has multiple ramparts (multivallate) following the contours of the hilltop, enclosing an area of about 2.4 ha (6 acres). Most of the perimeter is a double rampart, but the flatter eastern side has an extra counterscarp rampart with well-defined double ditches. There are two entrances to the south-east: one is a simple opening with evidence of a guardhouse; and the other shows linear features of a holloway. The fort contains about 14 round barrows (tumuli), which form a line of burials running east–west along the crest of the hill. The fort and the barrows appear to be Bronze Age, but excavations have found some Iron Age pottery in the barrows and the ditches.	1006175	Small Down Knoll camp	
Small multivallate promontory fort on Blacker's Hill	Chilcompton	Hill fort	Iron Age	ST 63666 50051; 51°14′58″N 2°31′20″W	Blacker's Hill is roughly rectangular and is a promentary type. It covers 6 hectares (15 acres) and originally had two ramparts and two ditches, but on the west and south sides it was defended by the steep drop. In some places the ramparts survive to a considerable height but on the north east side the inner rampart and ditch have been destroyed. There are three gaps but only that on the east seems to be original.	1015493	Upload Photo	
St Cuthbert's and Chewton lead mines and Fair Lady Well	Priddy	Lead mines	Roman to late 19th century	ST 54555 50561; 51°15′09″N 2°39′09″W	The remains of lead mines used between the Romano-British era until the late 19th century. It consists of a series of earthen banks and pools; however the buildings no longer exist. Fair Lady Well is a stone chamber over a spring which was constructed in the Middle Ages.	1421084	Upload Photo	
St Michael's Church, monastic remains, and other settlement remains on Glastonbury Tor	Glastonbury Tor	Ruined church tower	13th century	ST5121838615; 51°08′41″N 2°41′55″W	Several buildings have been constructed on the summit of Glastonbury Tor during the Saxon and early medieval periods; they have been interpreted as an early church and monks' hermitage. The head of a wheel cross dating from the 10th or 11th century has been recovered. The original wooden church was destroyed by an earthquake in 1275, and the stone Church of St Michael built on the site in the 14th century. Its tower remains, although it has been restored and partially rebuilt several times. Archaeological excavations during the 20th century sought to clarify the background of the monument and church, but some aspects of their history remain unexplained.	1019390	St Michael's Church, monastic remains, and other settlement remains on Glastonbury Tor More images	
Stow Barrow : a bowl barrow 700 m southwest of Haydon Grange Farm	Priddy	Bowl barrow	Neolithic to Bronze Age	ST 52065 53537; 51°16′44″N 2°41′19″W	A bowl barrow which is 35 metres (115 ft) in diameter.	1010522	Upload Photo	
Tedbury Camp	Great Elm	Multivallate hill fort	Iron Age	ST 74347 48794; 51°14′16″N 2°22′05″W	Promontory hill fort defended by two parallel banks. Also the site of Roman occupation and a coin hoard.	1006163	Tedbury Camp	
The Abbey Barn at Abbey Farm	Glastonbury	Barn	14th century	ST5036138551; 51°08′39″N 2°42′40″W	The Tithe Barn is now the venue for the Somerset Rural Life Museum. It is a museum of the social and agricultural history of Somerset, housed in buildings surrounding a 14th-century barn once belonging to Glastonbury Abbey. It was used as a Tithe barn for the storage of arable produce, particularly wheat and rye, from the abbey's home farm of approximately 212 hectares (524 acres). Threshing and winnowing would also have been carried out in the barn. The barn which was built from local shelly limestone, with thick timbers supporting the stone tiling of the roof. After the Dissolution of the Monasteries in 1539 the barn was given to the Duke of Somerset. By the early 20th century it was being used as a farm store by the Mapstone family. In 1974 they donated it to Somerset County Council and between 1976 and 1978 underwent restoration.	1019389	The Abbey Barn at Abbey Farm More images	
The Abbot's Fish House and fishponds	Meare	Fish house	14th century	ST4580441729; 51°10′20″N 2°46′36″W	The Abbot's Fish House was built in the 14th century. It is the only surviving monastic fishery building in England. Fishing was an important source of food for the monks of Glastonbury Abbey. Fishing was carried out in artificial ponds, which were mentioned at Meare in the Domesday Book and from the River Brue and Meare Pool. The present rectangular stone building was constructed by the abbot between 1322 and 1335 for the storage and processing of the fish and as a residence for the chief fisherman. After the Dissolution of the Monasteries the building fell into disrepair and it was seriously damaged by fire in the 1880s. Some restoration has been undertaken during the 20th century, including the replacement of the roof in the 1920s.	1008018	The Abbot's Fish House and fishponds More images	
The Devil's Bed and Bolster long barrow	Beckington	Long barrow	Neolithic	ST 81495 53333; 51°16′44″N 2°16′00″W	The long barrow is 35 metres (115 ft) long and 21 metres (69 ft) wide.	1017897	The Devil's Bed and Bolster long barrow	
The easternmost of three duck decoys on Walton Moor	Walton	Duck decoy	19th century	ST 46078 33855; 51°06′05″N 2°46′17″W	The remains of a duck decoy with a central island.	1014446	Upload Photo	
The Falconry, Farleigh Hungerford	Norton St Philip	Falconry	14th or 15th century	ST 79676 58022; 51°19′15″N 2°17′35″W	A rectangular stone two-storey cartshed and falconry.	1006172	Upload Photo	
The tithe barn	Doulting	Tithe barn	15th century	ST 64725 43024; 51°11′07″N 2°30′20″W	The Tithe Barn was built in the 15th century. Tithe barns were used to store tithes, from the local farmers to the ecclesiastical landlords. In this case the landlord was Glastonbury Abbey.	1003025	The tithe barn More images	
Tithe Barn, Pilton	Pilton	Tithe barn	14th century	ST5890140630; 51°09′48″N 2°35′21″W	The Tithe Barn in Pilton was built in the 14th century as a tithe barn to hold produce for Glastonbury Abbey. It was damaged by fire in 1963 and it remained a wreck until Michael Eavis, organiser of the Glastonbury Festival, bought it in 1995, and presented the barn to the Pilton Barn Trust. The project was made possible with a grant of £400,000 from English Heritage. The Glastonbury festival contributed a further £100,000.	1006224	Tithe Barn, Pilton More images	
The Tribunal	Glastonbury	House	15th century	ST4993438961; 51°08′52″N 2°43′02″W	The Tribunal was built in the 15th century as a merchant's house. The history of the building is not well documented, although the majority of the present stone house was constructed in the 15th century on the site of a 12th-century wooden building. The current front wall was added in the 16th century. It has been used as a merchant's house and possibly a shop and school. The building is currently in the guardianship of English Heritage and used as a tourist information centre. On the first floor is the museum of the Glastonbury Antiquarian Society which houses artefacts from Glastonbury Lake Village.	1014714	The Tribunal More images	
Three bowl barrows at Green Ore, two 150 m south east and one 420 m south west of Newlands Farm	St Cuthbert Out	Bowl barrow	Bronze Age	ST 57267 50230; 51°14′59″N 2°36′49″W	Three bowl barrows each around 15 metres (49 ft) in diameter.	1020546	Upload Photo	
Three bowl barrows 400 m north west of Haydon Hut	St Cuthbert Out	Bowl barrow	Bronze Age	ST 57865 48927; 51°14′17″N 2°36′18″W	A bowl barrow which is 22 metres (72 ft) in diameter.	1020021	Upload Photo	
Three bowl barrows in Big Plantation, 690 m south west of Beechbarrow	St Cuthbert Out	Bowl barrow	Bronze Age	ST 56696 48511; 51°14′03″N 2°37′18″W	Three bowl barrows each around 12 metres (39 ft) in diameter.	1020205	Upload Photo	
Three of the Priddy Circles and one barrow, 400 m west of Castle Farm	Priddy	Earthwork and enclosures	Neolithic	ST 54011 52781; 51°16′21″N 2°39′39″W	Priddy Circles are a linear arrangement of four circular earthwork enclosures. They are described as 'probable Neolithic ritual or ceremonial monuments similar to a henge'.	1015498	Three of the Priddy Circles and one barrow, 400 m west of Castle Farm	
Timber trackway site, 700 m west of Honeygar Farm	Meare	Timber trackway	Neolithic	ST 41793 42773; 51°10′52″N 2°50′03″W	The remains of a brushwood track built between 3650 and 3500 B.C.	1014434	Upload Photo	
Tinney's trackways, west of Sharpham Bridge	Sharpham	Timber trackway	Neolithic	ST 46708 38088; 51°08′23″N 2°45′47″W	The route of several brushwood tracks.	1014436	Upload Photo	
Two bell barrows and a bowl barrow 370 m east of Clover Farm: part of a group of round barrows west of Cranmore railway station	Cranmore	Bell barrows and a bowl barrow	Bronze Age	ST 65847 42744; 51°10′58″N 2°29′24″W	The bell barrows are 30 metres (98 ft) and 25 metres (82 ft) in diameter while the bowl barrow is 11 metres (36 ft).	1016304	Upload Photo	
Two bowl barrows 350 m south of Brimble Pit Pool: part of a group of round barrows north and east of Foxhills Wood	Westbury	Bowl barrow	Bronze Age	ST 50828 50469; 51°15′05″N 2°42′21″W	Two bowl barrows one of which is 17 metres (56 ft) in diameter and the other 12 metres (39 ft).	1016295	Upload Photo	
Two bowl barrows 550 m south west of Haydon House	St Cuthbert Out	Bowl barrow	Bronze Age	ST 57876 47893; 51°13′43″N 2°36′17″W	Two bowl barrows each approximately 13 metres (43 ft) in diameter.	1020208	Upload Photo	
Two bowl barrows 850 m south east of Brimble Pit Pool: part of a group of round barrows north and east of Foxhills Wood	Westbury	Bowl barrow	Bronze Age	ST 51219 50056; 51°14′51″N 2°42′01″W	Two bowl barrows one of which is 10 metres (33 ft) in diameter and the other 11.5 metres (38 ft).	1016294	Upload Photo	
Two bowl barrows on Barren Down, 250 m north west of Princes Lodge	Shepton Mallet	Bowl barrow	Bronze Age	ST 62097 44147; 51°11′43″N 2°32′38″W	Two bowl barrows, one of which is 18 metres (59 ft) in diameter and the other 11 metres (36 ft).	1019422	Upload Photo	
Two round barrows on Beacon Hill	Ashwick	Round barrow	Bronze Age	ST 63408 46142; 51°15′05″N 2°35′48″W	Two round barrows each around 12 metres (39 ft) in diameter.	1006200	Upload Photo	
Two round barrows SE of Castle of Comfort Inn	Chewton Mendip	Round barrow	Bronze Age	ST 54486 52935; 51°16′25″N 2°39′14″W	A long mound believed to be two adjacent round barrows.	1006217	Upload Photo	
Two round barrows 600 yd (550 m) ENE of Green Ore	Chewton Mendip	Round barrow	Bronze Age	ST 58461 50413; 51°15′05″N 2°35′48″W	Two mounds which are believed to be round barrows, surrounded by several other mounds which are thought to be spoil heaps.	1002959	Upload Photo	
Vobster Breach colliery, 890 m ENE of Tweed Farm	Leigh-on-Mendip	Coal mine	19th century	ST 69755 48900; 51°14′19″N 2°26′05″W	The remains of a coal mine including the coking ovens, shafts, drainage adits and branch railway.	1014867	Upload Photo	
Wadbury Camp	Mells	Univallate hill fort	Iron Age	ST 73753 48859; 51°14′21″N 2°22′49″W	A promontory hill fort covering 30 hectares (74 acres) surrounded by a bank and scarp.	1006162	Upload Photo	
Westbury Beacon, a bell barrow 720 m west of Brimble Pit Pool	Westbury	Bell barrow	Bronze Age	ST5004950748; 51°15′13″N 2°43′02″W	A bell barrow approximately 28 metres (92 ft) in diameter.	1006177	Upload Photo	
Westbury Camp, slight univallate hillfort, 750 m north of Stokewood Cottage	Rodney Stoke	Hill fort	Iron Age	ST 49201 51126; 51°15′30″N 2°43′37″W	Westbury Camp is a univallate Iron Age hill fort. The camp is largely situated in a hill slope. The north east defences has largely been destroyed by small quarries over the years. The narrow top of the hill bank suggests that it may have been surmounted by a dry stone wall. Along part of the east side of the camp there are traces of a berm between the bank and the outer ditch and at the western angle shallow quarry pits occur internally and externally set back from the 'rampart'.	1015500	Upload Photo	
Westbury village cross	Westbury	Cross	15th century	ST 50048 48806; 51°14′10″N 2°43′01″W	A 1.9 metres (6 ft 3 in) high shaft of a cross on a six step octagonal base.	1016292	Westbury village cross	
Whatley Combe Roman villa	Nunney	Earthworks	Romano-British	ST 74316 47005; 51°13′18″N 2°22′09″W	Earthworks from a multi-room Roman villa, with a bath suite, occupied during the 4th century.	1006188	Upload Photo	
Witham Priory	Witham Friary	Monastery	12th century	ST 75795 41646; 51°10′25″N 2°20′51″W	Earthworks from a Carthusian monastery which was occupied between the 12th and 16th centuries.	1006161	Witham Priory	
World War II bombing decoy complex, anti-aircraft obstructions and Beacon Batch round barrow cemetery on Black Down	Priddy	Earthworks	1940	ST 47960 57110; 51°18′42″N 2°44′30″W	Earthworks from a World War II bombing decoy town. The decoy, known under the code name Starfish used fires of creosote and water to simulate incendiary bombs exploding. The site was home to a Z battery of anti aircraft rockets. Piles of stones (known as cairns) were also created to prevent enemy aircraft from using the hilltop as a landing site.	1020995	World War II bombing decoy complex, anti-aircraft obstructions and Beacon Batch round barrow cemetery on Black Down	

== See also ==
- Scheduled Monuments in Somerset
- Grade I listed buildings in Mendip
- Grade II* listed buildings in Mendip
