= Milton Clevedon =

Village and civil parish in Somerset, England

Coordinates: 51.13578°N 2.48018°W

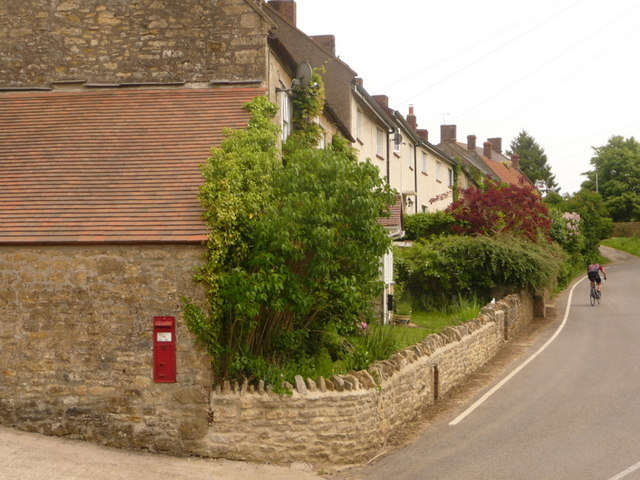
- Houses and post box

- Location within Somerset
- Population: 89 (2001)
- OS grid reference: ST665375
- Unitary authority: Somerset Council
- Ceremonial county: Somerset
- Region: South West
- Country: England
- Sovereign state: United Kingdom
- Post town: SHEPTON MALLET
- Postcode district: BA4
- Dialling code: 01749
- Police: Avon and Somerset
- Fire: Devon and Somerset
- Ambulance: South Western
- UK Parliament: Frome and East Somerset

Milton Clevedon is a village and civil parish 1 mile (1.6 km) south of Evercreech in the county of Somerset, England.

== History ==
The name of the village means the middle settlement, possibly because it is halfway between Evercreech and Bruton.

An early Iron Age earthwork, probably a stock enclosure but known as Fox Covert, occupies a spur of Creech Hill overlooking the River Alham valley. The site includes a possible barrow on the west.

In the late 12th century the manor was held under the Lovels of Castle Cary by William de Clevedon who gave the church to Bruton Abbey who held it until the dissolution of the monasteries.

The Mendip Hospital, built in 1845–47, is not near Milton Clevedon, it is located in St Cuthbert Out, near Wells.

== Governance ==
The parish council has responsibility for local issues, including setting an annual precept (local rate) to cover the council's operating costs and producing annual accounts for public scrutiny. The parish council evaluates local planning applications and works with the local police, district council officers, and neighbourhood watch groups on matters of crime, security, and traffic. The parish council's role also includes initiating projects for the maintenance and repair of parish facilities, as well as consulting with the district council on the maintenance, repair, and improvement of highways, drainage, footpaths, public transport, and street cleaning. Conservation matters (including trees and listed buildings) and environmental issues are also the responsibility of the council.

For local government purposes, since 1 April 2023, the parish comes under the unitary authority of Somerset Council. Prior to this, it was part of the non-metropolitan district of Mendip (established under the Local Government Act 1972). It was part of Shepton Mallet Rural District before 1974.

It is also part of the Frome and East Somerset county constituency represented in the House of Commons of the Parliament of the United Kingdom. It elects one Member of Parliament (MP) by the first past the post system of election.

== Religious sites ==
The Church of St James was rebuilt in 1790 and is a Grade II* listed building.
