= Church of St James, Milton Clevedon =

Church in Somerset, England

Church of St James
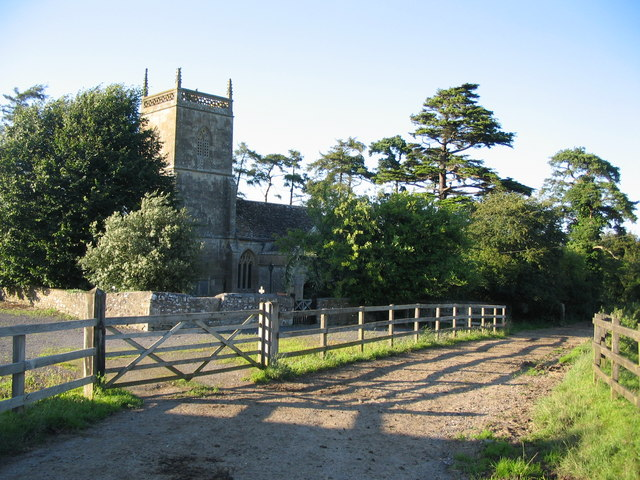

- Location within Somerset
- 51°08′18″N 2°28′51″W
- Location: Milton Clevedon, Somerset, England

History
- Built: 1790

Listed Building – Grade II*
- Designated: 2 June 1961
- Reference no.: 1059161

The Anglican Church of St James in Milton Clevedon, within the English county of Somerset, was rebuilt in 1790. It is a Grade II* listed building.

The first church in the village was in the 12th century. The advowson was held by Bruton Abbey until the Dissolution of the Monasteries. After this, in 1545 the church was dedicated to St James. The rebuilding in 1790 used stone from the abbey and incorporated some fabric from the medieval church. Victorian restoration occurred in the 1860s. The three stage tower is supported by diagonal buttresses and contains five bells, the oldest of which was cast in Bristol around 1380.

The parish is part of the benefice of Evercreech with Chesterblade and Milton Clevedon within the Diocese of Bath and Wells.

== See also ==
- List of ecclesiastical parishes in the Diocese of Bath and Wells
