= Battle of Posentesbyrg =

Anglo-Saxon invasions and the founding of England
Date	AD 661
Location	Posentesbyrg

The Battle of Posentesbyrg (Posentes byrg) was fought in AD 661 between the West Saxons under Cenwalh and the Mercians under Wulfhere. It was a victory for the Mercians and Cenwalh was forced to relinquish the territory he had gained from the Britons in Somerset. The exact modern location of the battle is uncertain.

== Saxon conquest of Eastern and Central Somerset ==
In 658 Cenwalh's West Saxons met the Britons for a climactic battle at Peonnum. The Saxons were victorious, and Cenwalh advanced west through the Polden Hills to the River Parrett, annexing eastern and central Somerset. Geoffrey Ashe suggests that Cenwalh's ultimate goal may have been gaining control over the valuable Glastonbury Abbey. Cenwalh's fledgling kingdom in Somerset was probably ruled from Glastonbury but his tenure there was brief. Wulfhere of Mercia ousted him in AD 661 having defeated him at the Battle of Posentesbyrg.

== Location ==
The battle site is usually considered to have been Pontesbury, based on the similarity of the name and its translation by Æthelweard, Ingram and others. There is no other place-name in Britain which bears any resemblance, but Cenwalh fighting at Pontesbury makes little sense in the context of him establishing a kingdom in Somerset. If the battle was in Shropshire, for an unknown reason he marched his army considerably more than a hundred miles to the north, leaving his embryonic Somerset kingdom vulnerable. David Cooper posits that the battle was actually fought at Ponter's Ball, an ancient embankment about a mile to the south-east of Glastonbury Tor. Almost a mile in length, this defensive dyke is aligned north-to-south and crosses a piece of raised ground which, in the seventh century, provided the only access by land to the Isle of Glastonbury. Posentes does not translate. Cooper suggests that it may be the name of a chief, corrupted to Ponter's on modern maps, and that 'ball' is a corruption of the Old English balc, which translates as a balk, beam, bank or ridge.

== See also ==
- History of Somerset
- Timeline of the Anglo-Saxon invasion and takeover of Britain
