= Blacker's Hill =

Iron Age hillfort in Somerset, England

- Location within Somerset
- 51°14′58″N 2°31′20″W
- Location: Chilcompton, Somerset, England

History
- Built: Iron Age

Site notes
- Area: 15 acres (6.1 ha)

Scheduled monument
- Reference no.: 200816

Blacker's Hill is an Iron Age hill fort at Chilcompton, 4.5 kilometres (3 mi) south west of Radstock, Somerset, England. It has been designated as a Scheduled Ancient Monument.

The hill fort is roughly rectangular and is a promentary type. It covers 6 hectares (15 acres) and originally had two ramparts and two ditches, but on the west and south sides it was defended by the steep drop. In some places the ramparts survive to a considerable height but on the north east side the inner rampart and ditch have been destroyed. There are three gaps but only that on the east seems to be original.

In 1999 a geophysical survey was carried out suggesting that Blackers Hill originated as a univallate structure and was then later modified, forming a developed hill fort.

== Background ==
Hill forts developed in the Late Bronze and Early Iron Age, roughly the start of the first millennium BC. The reason for their emergence in Britain, and their purpose, has been a subject of debate. It has been argued that they could have been military sites constructed in response to invasion from continental Europe, sites built by invaders, or a military reaction to social tensions caused by an increasing population and consequent pressure on agriculture. The dominant view since the 1960s has been that the increasing use of iron led to social changes in Britain. Deposits of iron ore were located in different places to the tin and copper ore necessary to make bronze, and as a result trading patterns shifted and the old elites lost their economic and social status. Power passed into the hands of a new group of people. Archaeologist Barry Cunliffe believes that population increase still played a role and has stated "[the forts] provided defensive possibilities for the community at those times when the stress [of an increasing population] burst out into open warfare. But I wouldn't see them as having been built because there was a state of war. They would be functional as defensive strongholds when there were tensions and undoubtedly some of them were attacked and destroyed, but this was not the only, or even the most significant, factor in their construction".

== See also ==
- List of hill forts and ancient settlements in Somerset
