= Drove Cottage Henge =

- Drove Cottage Henge shown within Somerset
- 51°14′44.37″N 2°37′59.47″W
- Location: Somerset, England

History
- Built: During the Neolithic Period

Site notes
- Area: Mendip Hills
- Architectural style: British pre-Roman Architecture

Scheduled monument
- Official name: Henge 370m north east of Drove Cottage
- Designated: 8 April 1997
- Reference no.: 29764

Drove Cottage Henge (sometimes called Hunter's Lodge Henge) is a scheduled monument in the Priddy parish of Somerset, England. It is located 370 metres (1,210 ft) north of Drove Cottage. The site is a ceremonial Neolithic location. Since this henge is one of only around 80 henges throughout England, it is considered to be nationally important.

== Description ==
Drove Cottage Henge is situated in a valley. The bank circumscribing the henge is about 11.5 metres (38 ft) thick and .4 metres (1.3 ft) high, with a diameter of around 54 metres (177 ft) when measuring from the outsides of the banks. Just inside this bank is a ditch 6 metres (20 ft) wide and .3 metres (0.98 ft) deep, enclosing a circular central area about 19 metres (62 ft) in diameter. In the northern portion of this central area is a low-lying mound in front of the exit, which appears as a break in the outside bank.

Jodie Lewis noted in 2005 that "Examples of southerly and north-north-westerly orientations, apropos Stockwood and Hunter's Lodge, are documented at other Class I henge sites, but are not common". Harding and Lee in 1987 said of it "HUNTERS LODGE, Priddy ST 559 498: Sub-oval enclosure, surviving as an earthwork, situated at the head of a shallow valley."

This whole site has become hard to see because repeated ploughing has heavily damaged the archaeological site, including the turf cover.

== Nearby archaeological sites ==
Four barrows are relatively close to Drove Cottage Henge. One is a disc barrow and a scheduled monument (designation #13840). Another is a bowl barrow and a scheduled monument (designation #13871). Another, also a bowl barrow, is a scheduled monument (designation #13872). The final barrow is probably a bowl barrow, but it may be a spoil dump. It too is a scheduled monument (designation #13873).

== See also ==
- Neolithic Europe
