= Brown's Gatehouse, Wells =

Brown's Gatehouse
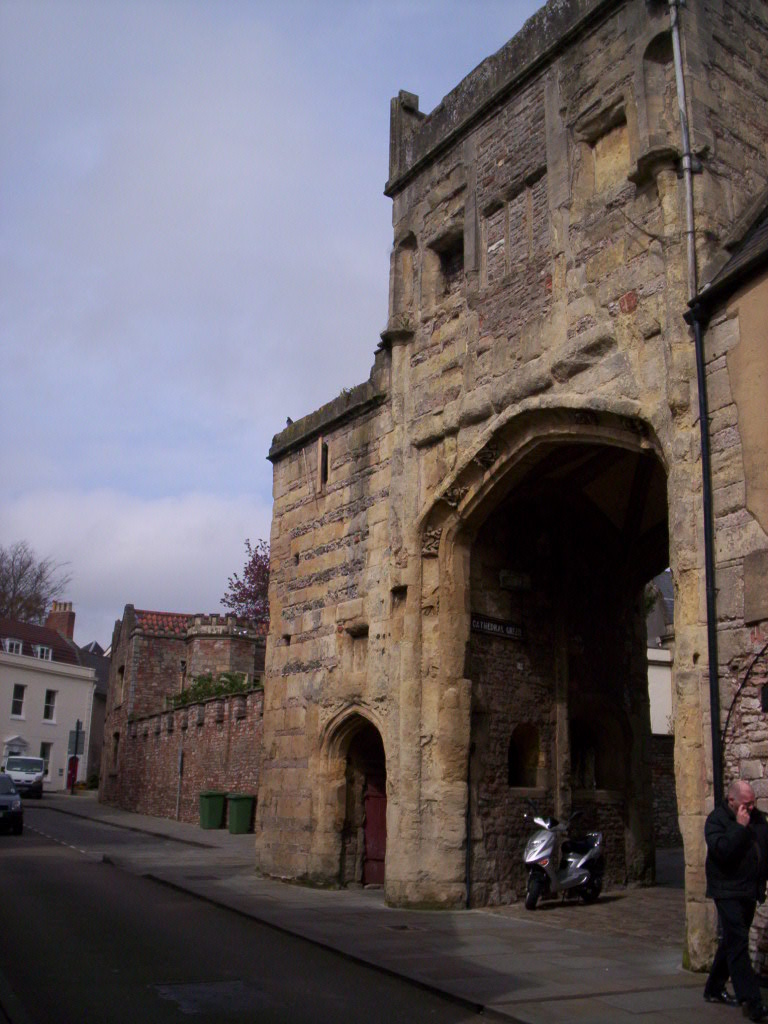

- Location within Somerset
- Alternative names: Dean's Eye

General information
- Location: Wells, Somerset
- Coordinates: 51.2103°N 2.6434°W
- Construction started: c1450

Brown's Gatehouse (also known as the Dean's Eye) in Wells, Somerset, England, is an entrance gateway into a walled precinct, the Liberty of St Andrew, which encloses the twelfth century Cathedral, the Bishop's Palace, Vicar's Close and the residences of the clergy who serve the cathedral. Brown's Gatehouse has been designated as a Grade I listed building and scheduled monument.

The Brown's Gatehouse was built around 1451, by Bishop Thomas Beckington (also spelt Beckyngton), at a cost of 200 marks. It provides an entrance to the Cathedral Precincts from Sadler Street. It is named after the shoemaker Richard Brown, who was the next door tenant in 1553 In the 19th century it was known as The Dean's Eye.

It is a two-storey archway of Doulting ashlar stone, with a Welsh slate roof with coped gables behind parapets. The arch has a ribbed vault. There is a doorway within the porch to a staircase to the first floor.
