= Westbury Camp =

Iron Age hillfort in Somerset, England

- Location within Somerset
- 51°15′30″N 2°43′37″W
- Location: Draycott, Somerset, England

History
- Built: Iron Age

Site notes
- Area: 2.3 hectares (5.7 acres)

Scheduled monument
- Reference no.: 194654

Westbury Camp is a univallate Iron Age hill fort in the Mendip Hills in Somerset, England. The hill fort is situated in the parish of Rodney Stoke, approximately 1 mile (1.6 km) north-east of the village of Draycott and 1.5 miles (2.4 km) north-west of Westbury-sub-Mendip. The camp is largely situated on a hill slope. The north east defences have largely been destroyed by small quarries over the years. The narrow top of the hill bank suggests that it may have been surmounted by a dry stone wall. Along part of the east side of the camp there are traces of a berm between the bank and the outer ditch and at the western angle shallow quarry pits occur internally and externally set back from the 'rampart'.

== Background ==
Hill forts developed in the Late Bronze and Early Iron Age, roughly the start of the first millennium BC. The reason for their emergence in Britain, and their purpose, has been a subject of debate. It has been argued that they could have been military sites constructed in response to invasion from continental Europe, sites built by invaders, or a military reaction to social tensions caused by an increasing population and consequent pressure on agriculture. The dominant view since the 1960s has been that the increasing use of iron led to social changes in Britain. Deposits of iron ore were located in different places to the tin and copper ore necessary to make bronze, and as a result trading patterns shifted and the old elites lost their economic and social status. Power passed into the hands of a new group of people. Archaeologist Barry Cunliffe believes that population increase still played a role and has stated "[the forts] provided defensive possibilities for the community at those times when the stress [of an increasing population] burst out into open warfare. But I wouldn't see them as having been built because there was a state of war. They would be functional as defensive strongholds when there were tensions and undoubtedly some of them were attacked and destroyed, but this was not the only, or even the most significant, factor in their construction".

== See also ==
- List of hill forts and ancient settlements in Somerset
