= Creech Hill =

Iron Age hillfort in Somerset, England

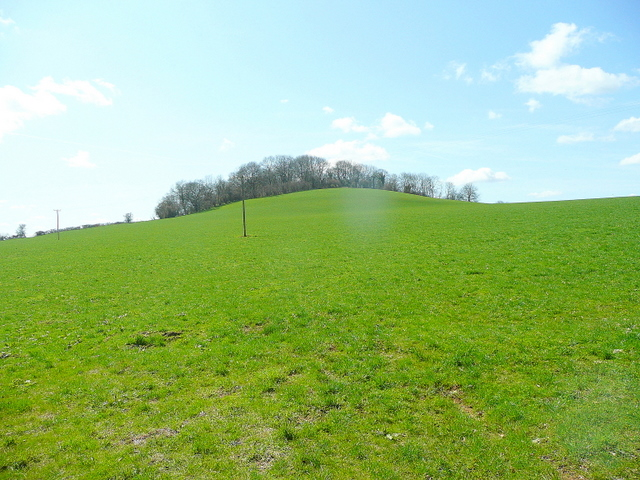
- Creech Hill

- Location within Somerset
- 51.118255°N 2.472106°W
- Location: Milton Clevedon and Lamyatt, Somerset, England

History
- Built: Bronze Age – Iron Age

Scheduled monument
- Official name: Creech Hill

Creech Hill is a hill in south east Somerset, England, which is notable for a univallate Iron Age hill fort. The hill is situated approximately 1.2 miles (1.9 km) north west of the small town of Bruton.

== Hill fort ==
The hill fort is at the northern end of Creech Hill, near the village of Milton Clevedon. It is a Scheduled Ancient Monument.

Hill forts developed in the Late Bronze and Early Iron Age, roughly the start of the first millennium BC. The reason for their emergence in Britain, and their purpose, has been a subject of debate. It has been argued that they could have been military sites constructed in response to invasion from continental Europe, sites built by invaders, or a military reaction to social tensions caused by an increasing population and consequent pressure on agriculture. The dominant view since the 1960s has been that the increasing use of iron led to social changes in Britain. Deposits of iron ore were located in different places to the tin and copper ore necessary to make bronze, and as a result trading patterns shifted and the old elites lost their economic and social status. Power passed into the hands of a new group of people. Archaeologist Barry Cunliffe believes that population increase still played a role and has stated "[the forts] provided defensive possibilities for the community at those times when the stress [of an increasing population] burst out into open warfare. But I wouldn't see them as having been built because there was a state of war. They would be functional as defensive strongholds when there were tensions and undoubtedly some of them were attacked and destroyed, but this was not the only, or even the most significant, factor in their construction".

== Roman temple ==
Lamyatt Beacon marks the highest area of the hill, and is the site of a Romano-Celtic temple, which was in use from 250 AD to 375 AD.

== Folklore ==
According to the folklorist Katharine Briggs, Creech Hill is said to be haunted by a ghost known as the Bullbeggar. From traditions collected by Ruth Tongue in 1906 and published in County Folklore (vol. 8) she recounts how in the 1880s two bodies had been dug up during quarrying operations. Afterward the hill became haunted by a "black uncanny shape" and unseen footsteps. A farmer coming home late one night saw a figure lying in the road and approached to offer help, whereupon it suddenly got up and chased him all the way to his own door. His family ran to his rescue and saw the figure bounding away with wild laughter. Another traveller at night was attacked on Creech Hill and defended himself from midnight to morning with the help of a staff made of ash.

== See also ==
- List of hillforts and ancient settlements in Somerset
