= Small Down Knoll =

Bronze Age hillfort in Somerset, England

- Small Down Camp
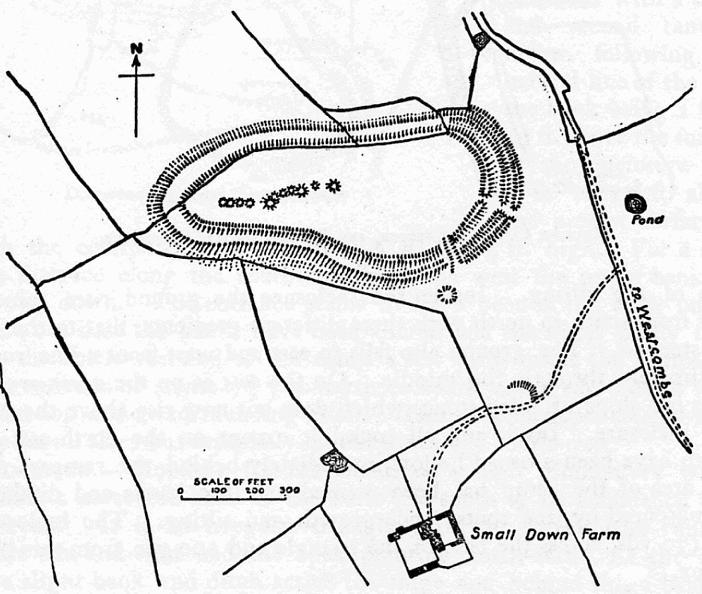
- Plan of earthworks at Small Down Knoll

- Location within Somerset
- 51°09′51″N 2°28′49″W
- Location: Evercreech, Somerset, England

Site notes
- Area: 2 hectares (4.9 acres)

Scheduled monument
- Reference no.: 200348

Small Down Knoll, or Small Down Camp, is a Bronze Age hill fort near Evercreech in Somerset, England. The hill is on the southern edge of the Mendip Hills, and rises to 222 m (728 ft).

Finds of flints indicate a prehistoric Mesolithic occupation.

The fort has multiple ramparts (multivallate) following the contours of the hilltop, enclosing an area of about 2.4 ha (6 acres). Most of the perimeter is a double rampart, but the flatter eastern side has an extra counterscarp rampart with well-defined double ditches. There are two entrances to the south-east. One of the entrances is a simple opening with evidence of a guardhouse and the other one shows linear features of a holloway.

The fort contains about 14 round barrows (tumuli), which form a line of burials running east–west along the crest of the hill. The fort and the barrows appear to be Bronze Age, but excavations have found some Iron Age pottery in the barrows and the ditches.

The fort is near the Fosse Way Roman road. The name of the nearby village of Stoney Stratton means on the stoney stone paved road, which implies there was also a local Roman road in the area, but there are no Roman or post-Roman remains on the site.

The fort was excavated in 1904 by Mr. H. St. George Gray, the finds included flints, pottery, and burials sites with human remains.

The hill fort is a Scheduled Ancient Monument, and an Open Access area under a DEFRA scheme.

== See also ==
- List of hill forts and ancient settlements in Somerset
