= New Ditch =

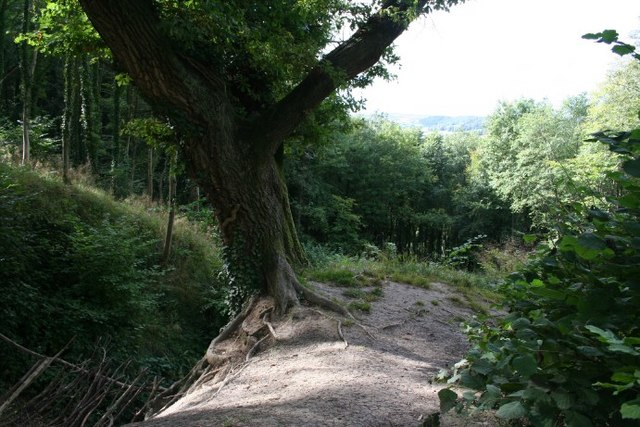

- Location within Somerset
- 51°05′47″N 2°42′37″W
- Location: Butleigh, Somerset, England

Scheduled monument
- Reference no.: Somerset 447

New Ditch is a linear earthwork of possible Iron Age or Medieval construction. It partially crosses the Polden Hills in woodlands approximately 1.1 miles (1.8 km) south-west from the village of Butleigh in Somerset, England.

Its construction is similar to Ponter's Ball Dyke 3 miles to the northeast, with the dyke on the south east of the embankment, but of less massive construction. Both were probably part of a more extensive defence scheme. It is nearly half a mile in length and was probably of greater extent originally, but as it stands, New Ditch cannot be termed a cross-ridge dyke although it does seem to be a boundary work.

It is debatable whether this site is ancient because it is located close to a medieval woodland and a deer park.
