= Fenny Castle =

Ancient castle ruin in southwest England

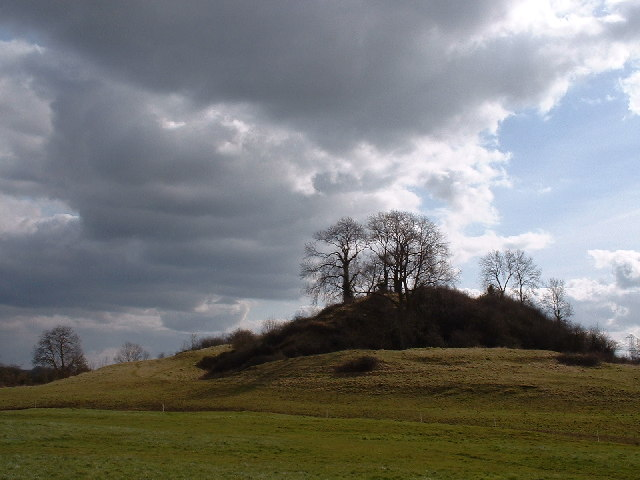

- Location within Somerset
- 51°11′22″N 2°42′19″W
- Location: Wookey, Somerset, England

History
- Built: c. 1140

Scheduled monument
- Official name: Fenny Castle
- Reference no.: 197243

Fenny Castle is the remains of a motte and bailey castle in the parish of Wookey, Somerset, England. It is a Scheduled Ancient Monument, but not accessible to the public.

It is sited on a natural hillock of Lias approximately 20 metres (66 ft) above the surrounding flat land on the edge of the Somerset Levels. Such sites were typically chosen for castles in low-lying areas.

The original builder of the castle is unknown, but it may be associated with the Anarchy, 1135–1153, a period of English history during the reign of King Stephen which was marked by a succession crisis between the supporters of Stephen and those of his cousin, the Empress Matilda. In 1327 the owner was William atte Castle. By 1480 it was described as a ruin by William Worcester who saw the plan of "all the houses and offices there". During the 19th century the quarrymen found twenty skeletons which were reported as dating from an unspecified period before the construction of the castle.

The castle gave its name to a hamlet of the parish of Wookey named 'Castle', one mile south-west of the main village. A stone cross in the hamlet, marking its importance, was still to be seen in 1839.

Little remains of the stonework, and there is evidence of extensive quarrying. The mound is now covered in grass and scrub with a few trees. However, the site was described in The Archaeology of Somerset (1982) as still having "interesting and prominent earthworks".

== See also ==
- Castles in Great Britain and Ireland
- List of castles in England
