= Ponter's Ball Dyke =

Cross dyke in Somerset, England

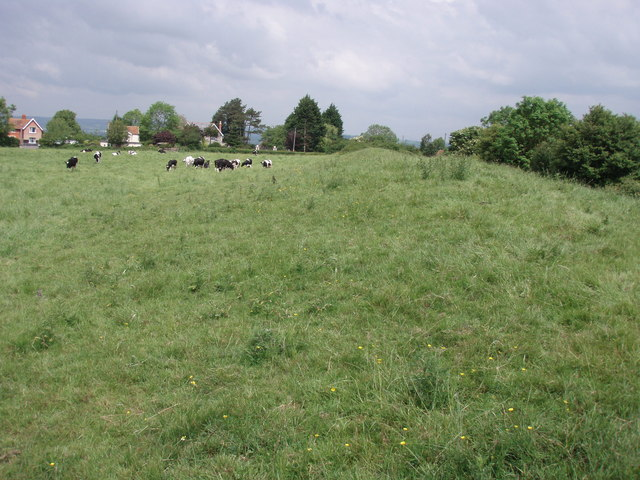

- Location within Somerset
- 51.138032°N 2.668244°W
- Location: near Glastonbury, Somerset, England

Scheduled monument
- Reference no.: Somerset 23564

Ponter's Ball Dyke is a linear earthwork located near Glastonbury in Somerset, England. It crosses, at right angles, an ancient road that continues on to the former island of dry land in the Somerset levels surrounding Glastonbury Tor. It consists of an embankment with a ditch on the east side. It is built across the ridge of land between Glastonbury and West Pennard. Both ends of the ditch and dyke disappear into moorland, formerly swamps.

The current visible remains extend to just over 1 kilometre. It is bisected by the A361 and crossed by three public footpaths. The gap where the road runs through the dyke is staggered, suggesting that the gap is original.

== History ==
It was excavated in 1909 by Arthur Bulleid, and again in 1970 by Peter Poyntz Wright and the Glastonbury Antiquarian Society. Bulleid's excavation just north of the road revealed that the bank was 9 feet high and made of layers of yellow and grey clay, while the ditch was 12 feet deep in hard blue marl. Neither excavation found significant objects with the exception of fragmentary pottery of prehistoric and medieval origin.

Interpretation of the site is not clear. It is possible that it was part of a longer defensive barrier associated with New Ditch three miles to the south-west which is built in a similar manner. It has been suggested that it is part of a great Celtic sanctuary, probably 3rd century B.C., while others date it to the post-Roman period and connect it with the Dark Age occupation on Glastonbury Tor. David Cooper posits that it was the site of the Battle of Posentesbyrg, fought in AD 661 between Cenwalh of Wessex and Wulfhere of Mercia. The 1970 excavation suggests the 12th century or later.

Using LiDAR data of the area to simulate rising sea levels suggests the ditch once ran into marshy land (likely prior to the effective digging of drainage channels). This goes some way to explaining its limited extent. It is also claimed that Ponter's Ball delineates the long single horn on the head of the Capricorn effigy in the Temple of the Stars, an alleged ancient temple thought to be situated around Glastonbury.

== Nomenclature ==
The name Ponter's Ball is said to be derived from "pontis vallum", Latin meaning "the bridge over the ditch." In the early 19th century it was called Ponting's Ball and by 1876 Fronter's Ball. An alternative of Portarius after a family who owned land at Havyatt.
