= King's Castle, Wells =

Iron Age hillfort in Somerset, England

King's Castle
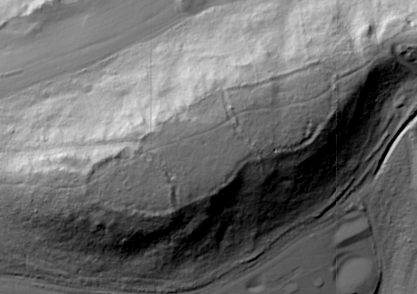
- Lidar digital terrain model of King's Castle

- Location within Somerset
- 51.2084°N 2.6191°W
- Location: Mendip Hills, Somerset, England
- Nearest city: Wells
- OS grid reference: ST5688245641

History
- Built: Iron Age

Site notes
- Area: 1.02 hectares (2.5 acres) (two main enclosures combined)
- Governing body: English Heritage

Scheduled monument
- Official name: King's Castle enclosures, Iron Age defended settlement
- Designated: 30 May 1958
- Reference no.: 1008807

King's Castle is an Iron Age enclosed hilltop settlement at the south-western edge of the Mendip Hills near Wells in Somerset, England. Though there are many prehistoric sites in the surrounding area, it remains one of the earliest known settlements in the immediate vicinity of Wells, and may have been a precursor to the present day city. It consists of two or three interlinked sub-enclosures, with what appears to be a field system extending to the east; an unusual layout, the site remains relatively little studied and has not been archaeologically excavated. It is a Scheduled Ancient Monument, and shares its name with the surrounding King's Castle Wood—today a Somerset Wildlife Trust nature reserve—though this name is probably a modern invention.

== Background ==
Hill forts developed in the Late Bronze and Early Iron Age, roughly the start of the first millennium BC. The reason for their emergence in Britain, and their purpose, has been a subject of debate. It has been argued that they could have been military sites constructed in response to invasion from continental Europe, sites built by invaders, or a military reaction to social tensions caused by an increasing population and consequent pressure on agriculture. The dominant view since the 1960s has been that the increasing use of iron led to social changes in Britain. Deposits of iron ore were located in different places to the tin and copper ore necessary to make bronze, and as a result trading patterns shifted and the old elites lost their economic and social status. Power passed into the hands of a new group of people. Archaeologist Barry Cunliffe believes that population increase still played a role and has stated "[the forts] provided defensive possibilities for the community at those times when the stress [of an increasing population] burst out into open warfare. But I wouldn't see them as having been built because there was a state of war. They would be functional as defensive strongholds when there were tensions and undoubtedly some of them were attacked and destroyed, but this was not the only, or even the most significant, factor in their construction".

== See also ==
- List of hill forts and ancient settlements in Somerset
