= Maesbury Castle =

Iron Age hillfort in Somerset, England

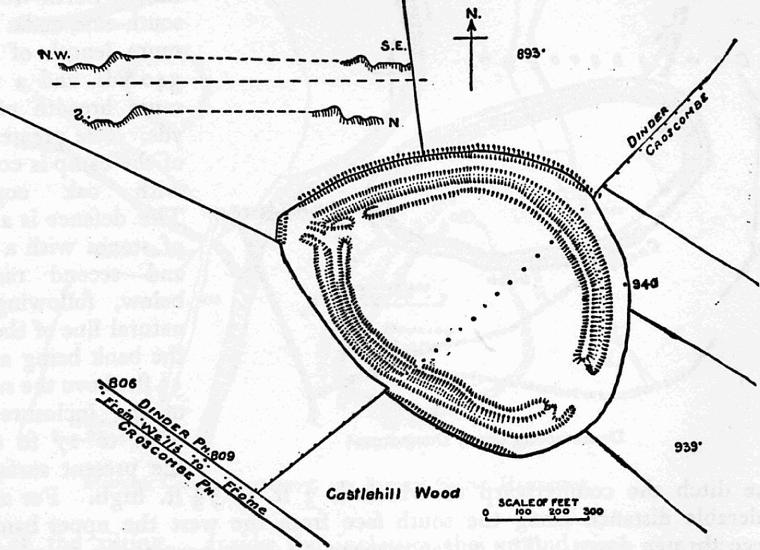
- Plan of earthworks at Maesbury Castle

- Location within Somerset
- 51°13′20″N 2°33′35″W
- Location: Croscombe, Somerset, England

History
- Built: Iron Age

Site notes
- Area: 2.5 hectares (6.2 acres)

Scheduled monument
- Official name: Maesbury Castle small multivallate hillfort
- Designated: 19 December 1929
- Reference no.: 1015494

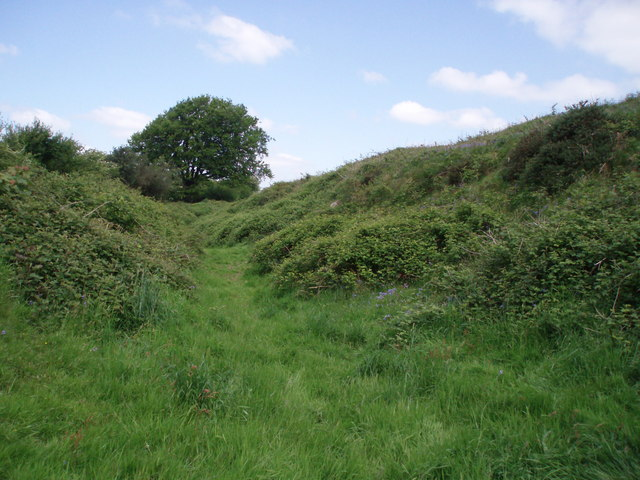
The ditch and bank at Maesbury Castle

Maesbury Castle is an Iron Age hill fort within the parish of Croscombe on the Mendip Hills, just north of Shepton Mallet, Somerset, England. It has been listed as a Scheduled Ancient Monument.

The name is derived from maes, meaning field or plain in Brythonic Welsh, and burh, meaning fort in Old English. There is also a record of the name Merksburi in 705 AD, meaning boundary fort. The area was a boundary between the Romano-British Celts and West Saxons during the period 577-652 AD, when the nearby Wansdyke fortification comprised part of the border.

The enclosure has an area of 2.5 hectares (6.2 acres), and lies at a height of 292 m (950 ft), with views in many directions. This includes the Somerset Levels to Glastonbury Tor and Brent Knoll which are the closest and probably the most easily identifiable landmarks from the site. The fort has a single rampart up to 6 m high, with an outer ditch (univallate). Entrances are to the south-east and north-east (with possible outworks).

The Fort and surrounding grounds are now owned by the Stevens' family who have been farming in Somerset for over 60 years.

== Background ==
Hill forts developed in the Late Bronze and Early Iron Age, roughly the start of the first millennium BC. The reason for their emergence in Britain, and their purpose, has been a subject of debate. It has been argued that they could have been military sites constructed in response to invasion from continental Europe, sites built by invaders, or a military reaction to social tensions caused by an increasing population and consequent pressure on agriculture. The dominant view since the 1960s has been that the increasing use of iron led to social changes in Britain. Deposits of iron ore were located in different places to the tin and copper ore necessary to make bronze, and as a result trading patterns shifted and the old elites lost their economic and social status. Power passed into the hands of a new group of people. Archaeologist Barry Cunliffe believes that population increase still played a role and has stated "[the forts] provided defensive possibilities for the community at those times when the stress [of an increasing population] burst out into open warfare. But I wouldn't see them as having been built because there was a state of war. They would be functional as defensive strongholds when there were tensions and undoubtedly some of them were attacked and destroyed, but this was not the only, or even the most significant, factor in their construction."

The site rises to 292 metres (958 ft) above sea level and enables a view over the surrounding valleys and hills. The hill has not eroded as fast as the surrounding limestone as it is made of Old Red Sandstone deposited in the Devonian period approximately 400 million years ago.

== See also ==
- Maes Knoll, 20 km to the north.
- List of hill forts in England
- List of hill forts and ancient settlements in Somerset
