= Priddy Nine Barrows and Ashen Hill Barrow Cemeteries =

Archaeological site in Somerset, United Kingdom

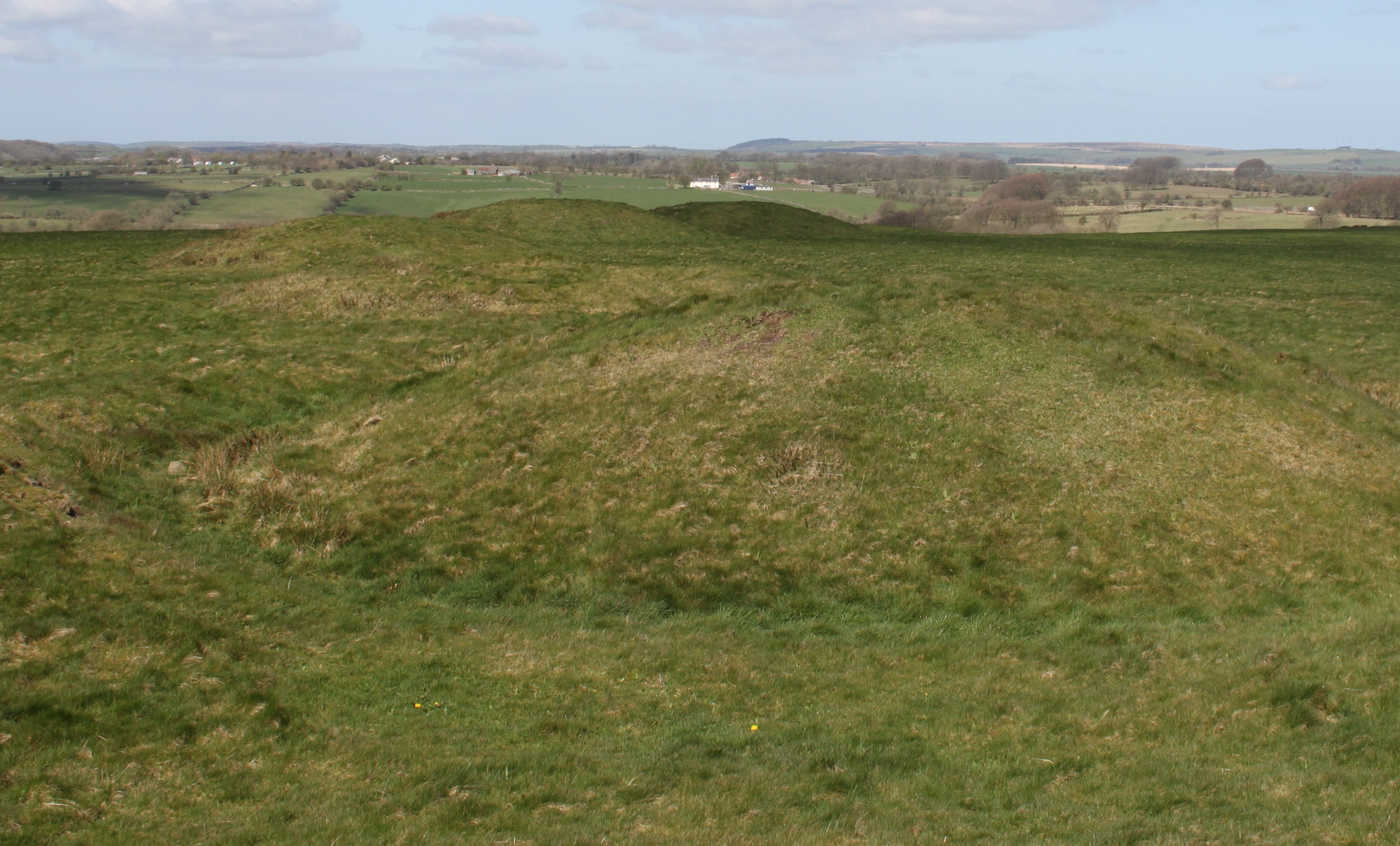
- Priddy Nine Barrows Cemetery

- Location within Somerset
- 51°15′46″N 2°39′45″W

Scheduled monument
- Official name: Group of seven round barrows 380m east of East Water Drove (Part of Priddy Nine Barrows Cemetery)
- Designated: 9 October 1981
- Reference no.: 1010503

Scheduled monument
- Official name: Ashen Hill barrow cemetery: a group of eight round barrows 500m southeast of Harptree Lodge
- Designated: 20 July 1933
- Reference no.: 1010513

Priddy Nine Barrows Cemetery and Ashen Hill Barrow Cemetery are a collection of round barrows, dating from the Bronze Age (c.2000-700 BC), near Priddy in the English county of Somerset. They are designated as ancient monuments.

The barrows sit on crests of land at either end of a field in an area of the Mendip Hills with several Neolithic remains. They are assumed to be related to the Priddy Circles which lie 750 metres (2,460 ft) to the north. Ashen Hill consists of six bowl barrows and two bell barrows aligned east to west while Priddy Nine Barrows divided into one group of seven round barrows and another pair slightly separated from the others.

Excavations in 1815 uncovered cremation burials and grave goods. A geophysical magnetometry survey suggested that there may have been three further barrows.

== Location ==
Ashen Hill Barrow Cemetery with views to Priddy Nine Barrows, Stock Hill, Priddy Mineries and Priddy Pools

The field where the monuments are located is 750 metres (2,460 ft) south of the Priddy Circles, a linear arrangement of four circular earthwork enclosures described as 'probable Neolithic ritual or ceremonial monuments similar to a henge'.

It is approximately 1 kilometre (0.62 mi) east of the village of Priddy itself and 0.5 kilometres (0.31 mi) west of Stock Hill a Forestry Commission plantation. Between the barrows and Stock Hill is the Priddy Mineries, a nature reserve of the Somerset Wildlife Trust, which is itself a part of the Priddy Pools Site of Special Scientific Interest (SSSI) which was worked for lead for many centuries.

The cemeteries sit on the two highest ridges in the area with Priddy Nine Barrows being 307 metres (1,007 ft) above sea level and Ashen Hill at 295 metres (968 ft).

== Description ==
=== Ashen Hill ===
Ashen Hill Barrow Cemetery is the most northerly of the sites and consists of six bowl barrows and two bell barrows aligned east to west, although :Lewes suggests that three may be bell barrows. Each of the mounds is between 14 metres (46 ft) and 20 metres (66 ft) in diameter and rising to between 2 metres (6 ft 7 in) and 3 metres (9.8 ft) high. Each is surrounded by a ditch which has become infilled over time. To the north and east of the barrows are further signs of excavations but these were related to lead extraction.

=== Priddy Nine Barrows ===
The southern area consists of the Priddy Nine Barrows which is divided into one group of seven round barrows and another pair. The group of seven are in a line on the crest of North Hill. Each is between 12 metres (39 ft) and 27 metres (89 ft) in diameter and rises to between 1 metre (3 ft 3 in) and 3 metres (9.8 ft) high. Each is surrounded by a shallow ditch which has become partly infilled. The tops of some of the barrows have indentations which are believed to have been caused by early 19th century excavations.

The pair of bowl barrows are approximately 150 metres (490 ft) north of the most westerly of the group of seven, with a 20 metres (66 ft) between them. Similarly to the other seven they are around 20 metres (66 ft) in diameter and rise to between 2.5 metres (8 ft 2 in) and 3 metres (9.8 ft) high.

They have been known as Priddy Nine Barrows since 1296.

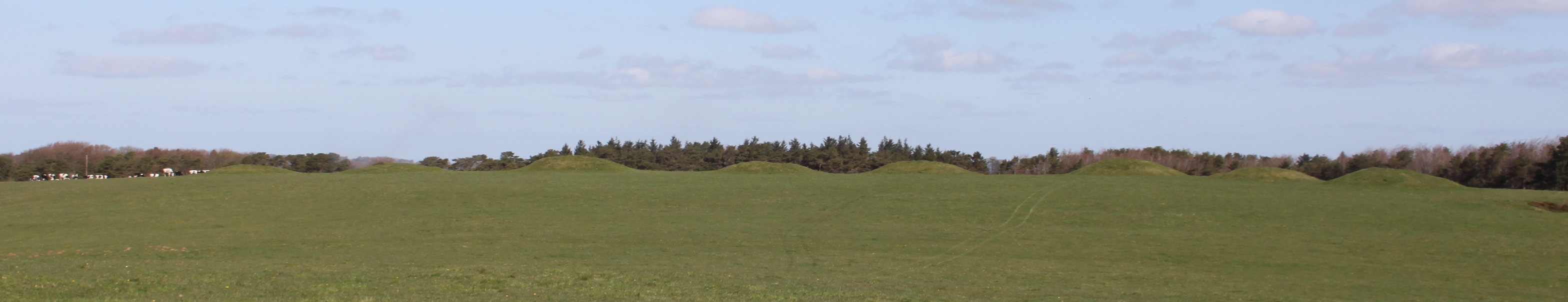
Ashen Hill Barrow Cemetery

== Excavations and investigations ==
In 1815 John Skinner carried out a partial excavation and identified cremation burials in an oval cyst which was covered by a flat stone just below where ground level would have been in the Bronze Age. He also uncovered bronze daggers and spear head, decorative amber beads, a bronze ring and a small incense cup.

At least one of the Ashen Hill Barrows was excavated by a team led by Herbert E. Balch in 1894.

They were scheduled as ancient monuments in 1933, possibly to stop excavation by the University of Bristol Spelæological Society and local schools.

A geophysical magnetometry survey investigated the area between the existing seven and the outliers which make up Priddy Nine Barrows suggesting that there may have been three further barrows, however the work was inconclusive. The result suggested a ring ditch and some other disturbances by any further barrows could have been disturbed by lead mining.
