= Hales Castle =

Medieval castle in Somerset, England

- Somerset, England
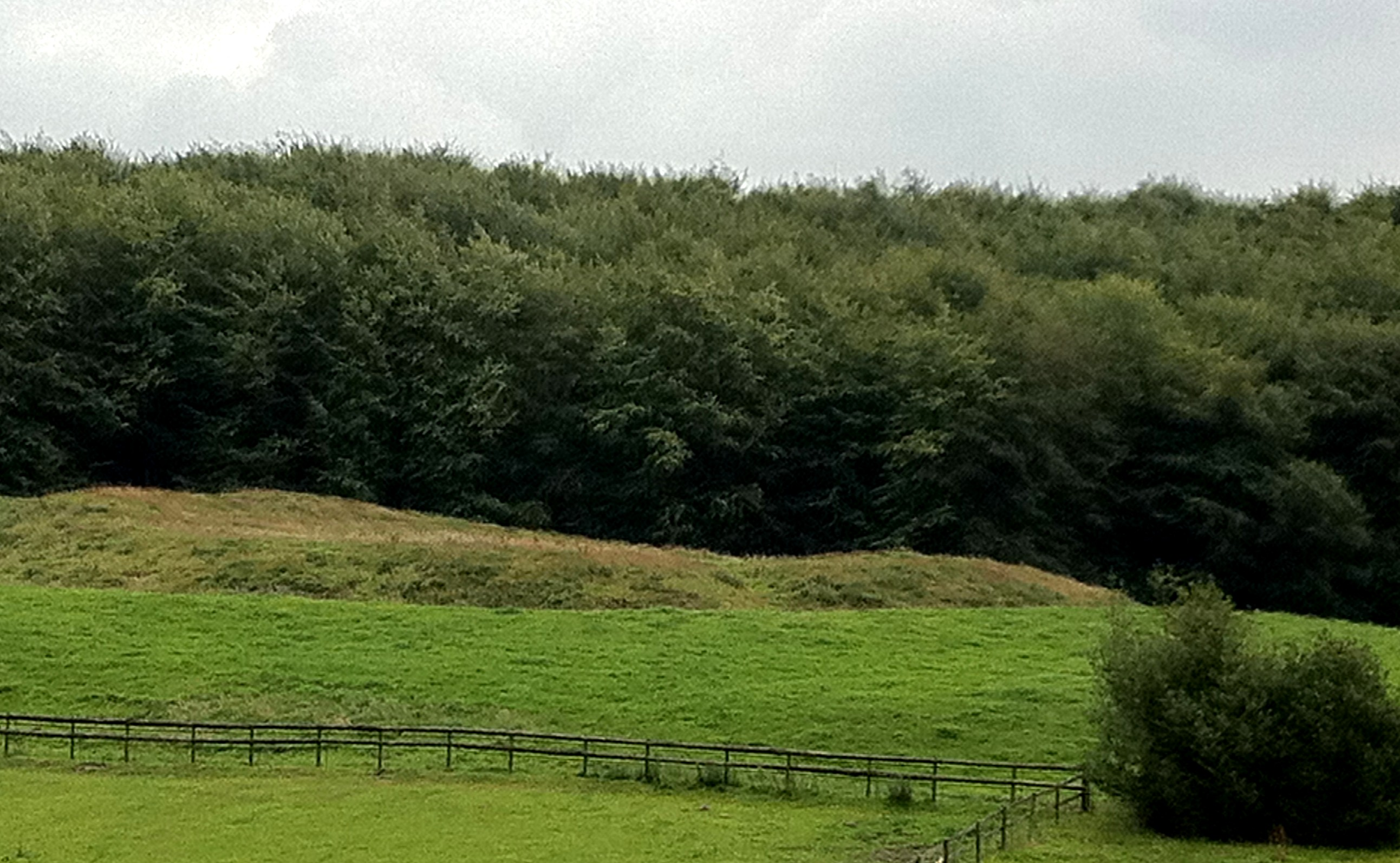
- Earthworks of Hales Castle

Site information
- Type: Motte and bailey
- Condition: Only earthworks remain

Location
- Shown within Somerset
- Coordinates: 51.1971°N 2.291°W

Hales Castle was a medieval castle that once stood overlooking the town of Frome in the Mendip district of Somerset, England. It has been scheduled as an ancient monument.

== History ==
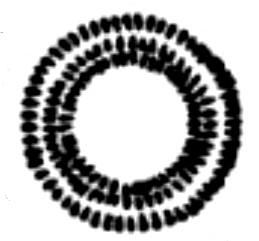
1911 plan of the ringwork

Hales Castle was built, probably in the years immediately after the Norman conquest of England in 1066, overlooking the town of Frome in the Mendip district of Somerset, England. In addition to supporting the Norman control of the local town, it was also close to the River Frome and the Roman road running from Poole Harbour on to the town of Bath, both important lines of communication for the Normans.

The circular ringwork is 120 feet (37 m) in diameter and stands on the northern slope of Roddenbury Hill, close to the Iron Age Roddenbury Hillfort. It comprises banks and outer ditches and has an unfinished bailey. It covers an area of 0.11 hectares (0.27 acres) and the bank is between 0.3 metres (1 ft 0 in) and 1.2 metres (3 ft 11 in) high. There may have been a drawbridge at the entrance.

== See also ==
- Castles in Great Britain and Ireland
- List of castles in England
- Gatehouse for overhead photo and more details

== Bibliography ==
- Prior, Stuart. (2006) The Norman Art of War: a Few Well-Positioned Castles. Stroud, UK: Tempus. ISBN 0-7524-3651-1.
