= Fox Covert =

Nature reserve in England

Coordinates: 52.039659°N 0.056485°W

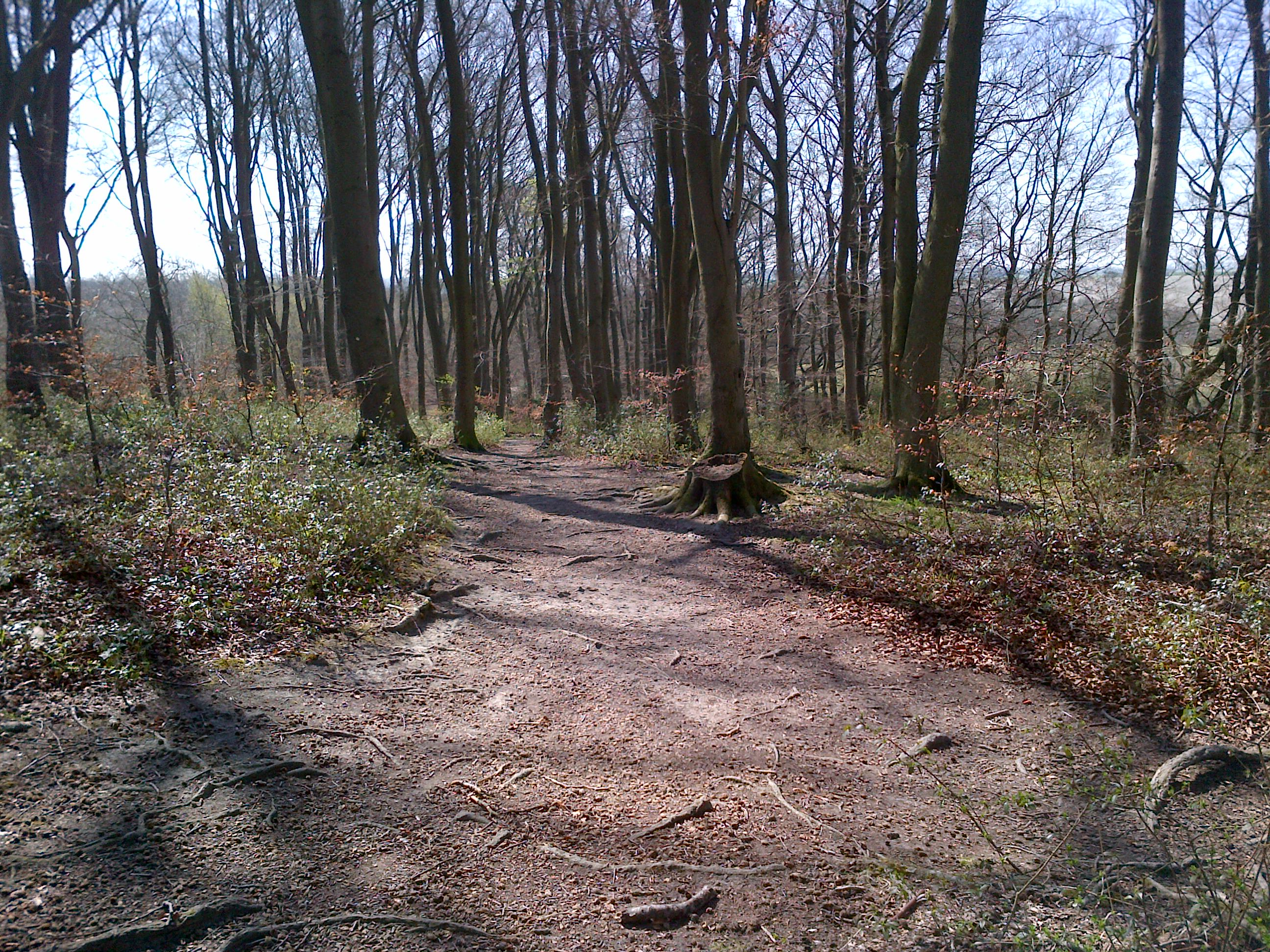

Fox Covert is a 2.9-hectare (7.2-acre) nature reserve near Royston in North Hertfordshire. It is owned and managed by the Herts and Middlesex Wildlife Trust.

The site is a mature beech woodland that was planted in the nineteenth century. White helleborine orchids are commonly found as ground flora around the area. The reserve houses deer and various species of birds. In 1964, Fox Covert was offered as a gift by Mr. Fordham of Letchworth and became the Trust's first nature reserve.

Fox Covert borders the Therfield Heath Site of Special Scientific Interest, and has the Hertfordshire Way long distance footpath passing through it.
