= Iscalis =

Iscalis was a Roman settlement described by Ptolemy. The exact location has not been clearly identified but the possible sites are in the modern ceremonial county of Somerset, England.

One of the possible sites is at Gatcombe which was occupied from the middle of the 1st century until at least the fifth century, demonstrated by the coins of Theodosius, Magnus Maximus and Arcadius which have been found. The full extent of the site is unclear, beyond a specific villa but there is some evidence that the site is much more extensive, possibly forming a village or even a town.

The second possible site identified is Charterhouse Roman Town. The settlement grew up around the north-western edge of prehistoric lead and silver mines, which were exploited by the Romans. Extraction is thought to have begun as early as AD 49. An amphitheatre stood west of the settlement. It is the only one in England to exist at a lead mine and is additional evidence of the importance of Mendip lead to the Romans.

Another suggestion is that Iscalis was at the mouth of the River Axe near Bawdrip. River Axe is Brean Down not Bawdrip.

Another possible site is Cheddar Palace.
