= List of hillforts and ancient settlements in Somerset =

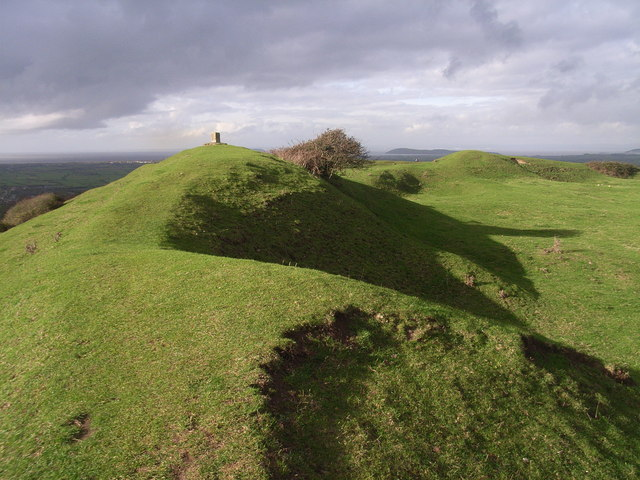
A picture of Brent Knoll Camp showing some of the old walls

Somerset is a ceremonial county in South West England. It is a rural county of rolling hills, such as the Mendip Hills, Quantock Hills and Exmoor National Park, and large flat expanses of land including the Somerset Levels. Modern man came to what is now known as Somerset during the Early Upper Palaeolithic era. In the Neolithic era, from about 3500 BC, there is evidence of farming when people started to manage animals and grow crops on farms cleared from the woodland, rather than act purely as hunter gatherers. It is also likely that extraction and smelting of mineral ores to make tools, weapons, containers and ornaments in bronze and then iron started in the late Neolithic and into the Bronze and Iron Ages.

The construction of hillforts began in Britain in the Late Bronze and Early Iron Age, roughly the start of the first millennium BC. The reason for their emergence, and their purpose, has been a subject of debate. It has been argued that they could have been military sites constructed in response to invasion from continental Europe, sites built by invaders, or a military reaction to social tensions caused by an increasing population and consequent pressure on agriculture. The dominant view since the 1960s has been that the increasing use of iron led to social changes in Britain. Deposits of iron ore were separated from the sources of tin and copper necessary to make bronze, and as a result trading patterns shifted and the old elites lost their economic and social status. Archaeologist Barry Cunliffe believes that population increase played a role and has stated "the forts provided defensive possibilities for the community at those times when the stress of an increasing population burst out into open warfare. But I would not see them as having been built because there was a state of war. They would be functional as defensive strongholds when there were tensions and undoubtedly some of them were attacked and destroyed, but this was not the only, or even the most significant, factor in their construction".

There are numerous Iron Age hillforts and ancient settlement sites in the county, some of which were later reused in the Dark Ages, such as Cadbury Castle, Worlebury Camp and Ham Hill. Other hillforts, such as Small Down Knoll, Solsbury Hill, Dolebury Warren and Burledge Hill, may have had a domestic purpose as well as a defensive role. The Iron Age tribes of the Somerset area were the Dobunni in north Somerset, Durotriges in south Somerset and Dumnonii in west Somerset. Iron Age sites on the Quantock Hills, include major hillforts at Dowsborough and Ruborough, as well as smaller earthwork enclosures, such as Trendle Ring, Elworthy Barrows and Plainsfield Camp. In addition to the hillforts, several sites have been identified as settlements during the pre Roman period including Cambria Farm and the "Lake Villages" at Meare and Glastonbury which were built on a morass, on an artificial foundation of timber filled with brushwood, bracken, rubble and clay. Most of the sites fell out of use with the coming of the Romans and therefore this list covers those sites occupied until that time.

Almost all of the sites in the list are Scheduled Monuments. In the United Kingdom, a Scheduled Monument is a "nationally important" archaeological site or historic building, given protection against unauthorised change. Scheduled Monuments are specified in the Ancient Monuments and Archaeological Areas Act 1979, which defines a monument as:

Any building, structure or work above or below the surface of the land, any cave or excavation; any site comprising the remains of any such building, structure or work or any cave or excavation; and any site comprising or comprising the remains of any vehicle, vessel or aircraft or other movable structure or part thereof... (Section 61 (7)).

Damage to a scheduled monument is a criminal offence and any work taking place at one of these sites requires Scheduled Monument Consent from the Secretary of State. In England, the Department for Culture, Media and Sport keeps the register, or schedule, of nationally important sites which receive state protection, which now includes over 31,000 sites.

== Known hillforts and settlements ==
List of hillforts and ancient settlements in Somerset
| Site name Alternative name(s) | Age | National Heritage List for England number | Plan or photo | Location | Description |
|---|---|---|---|---|---|
| Athelney hillfort | Iron Age | 1019099 | | Athelney; 51.0557°N 2.9331°W | Athelney Hillfort is an Iron Age hillfort. It is in the area where Alfred the Great hid from the Danes after his defeat in 876 AD. The hillfort may also be the site where Alfred defeated the Danes two years later. |
| Backwell hillfort | Iron Age | – | | Backwell; 51.4092°N 2.7289°W | In 1933, Backwell Camp, an Iron Age hillfort, was discovered. Two of its three sides were protected by a ditch and a bank, with the outside of the bank on the edge of the cliffs upon which the fort was built. However, by 1956, quarrying had almost completely destroyed the site. |
| Banwell Camp | Stone Age; Bronze Age; Iron Age | 1008031 | – | Banwell; 51.3270°N 2.8496°W | Banwell Camp is a univallate Iron Age hillfort. Artefacts found in the campsite date back to the Bronze Age and Stone Age. Some of the older banks in this site are still around 4 metres (13 ft) high. |
| Bathampton Camp | Iron Age | 1002480 | | Bathampton; 51.3847°N 2.3262°W | The site of an early Iron Age stock enclosure which may also have been a fort. It was also used as a Roman field system. The site was excavated in the early 1900s and again in the 1950s. Artefacts from the site include human and animal remains, pottery, and flint flakes. |
| Bat's Castle Caesar's Camp | Iron Age | 1007667 | | Carhampton; 51.1696°N 3.4495°W | Bat's Castle is an Iron Age hillfort on the highest point of Gallox Hill. Previously, it was known as "Caesar's Camp", and it is possibly associated with Black Ball Camp. Bat's Castle has two stone ramparts and two ditches. The ramparts are damaged in places due to the number of visitors. |
| Berry Castle Bury Camp | Late Iron Age or early Romano-British | 1006204 | – | Luccombe; 51.1924°N 3.6335°W | Berry Castle is a hillside enclosure which survives as a series of earthworks. It dates from the late Iron Age or early Romano-British period. |
| Black Ball Camp British Camp | Iron Age | 1007668 | | Dunster; 51.1740°N 3.4540°W | Black Ball Camp is an Iron Age hillfort on the northern summit of Gallox Hill. It is also known as "British Camp" and is possibly associated with Bat's Castle. It has a 3 metres (10 ft) high rampart and a 2 metres (7 ft) deep ditch. At the beginning of the 20th century, the foundations of a stone tower were visible. |
| Blacker's Hill | Iron Age | 1015493 | – | Chilcompton; 51.2493°N 2.5221°W | This Iron Age promontory hillfort, Blacker's Hill, is roughly rectangular. It covers 6 hectares (15 acres) and originally had two ramparts and two ditches, but on the west and south sides, it was defended by the steep drop. In some places, the ramparts are still considerable, but on the north-eastern side, the inner rampart and ditch have been destroyed. There are three gaps, but only the one on the east seems to be original. |
| Brean Down hillfort | Bronze Age | 1008211 | | Brean; 51.3230°N 3.0102°W | Brean Down is a Bronze Age hillfort situated on a peninsula jutting out into the Bristol Channel. In ancient times, there were fields and barrows around the fort. The site is now a National Trust site. Roman coins have also been found here. |
| Brent Knoll Camp | Iron Age | 1008248 | | Brent Knoll; 51.2543°N 2.9457°W | The Brent Knoll Camp hillfort is a 1.6 hectares (16,000 m^{2}) Iron Age hillfort that has been heavily damaged by cattle and quarrying. It is defended by a single wall around 10 metres (33 ft) high and by a single ditch, with an entrance on the eastern side. An urn containing coins of the Roman Emperors Trajan and Severus has been found at the site. |
| Brewer's Castle | Iron Age | 1021358 | – | Dulverton; 51.0563°N 3.5949°W | Brewer's Castle, in Hawkridge Wood was an Iron Age defended settlement or hillfort. It is very close to Mounsey Castle. |
| Broomfield Camp Higher Castles enclosure | Late Prehistoric and/or Roman | – | – | Broomfield; 51.0824°N 3.1199°W | The univallate enclosure site at Broomfield dates from late prehistoric or Roman times. Archeological excavations in 1968 uncovered a trench through a bank and ditch which produced Iron Age pottery. |
| Burgh Walls Camp | Iron Age | – | – | Long Ashton; 51.4515°N 2.6278°W | Burgh Walls Camp is a multivallate Iron Age hillfort on the banks above the River Avon, near where it is now crossed by the Clifton Suspension Bridge. It is also called "Bower Walls Camp", "Burwalls", or "Bowre Walls". |
| Burledge Hillfort | Iron Age | 1004526 | | Bishop Sutton; 51.3232°N 2.6012°W | Burledge hillfort is an univallate Iron Age hillfort situated on a promontory. The eastern side, the one with the most gradual slope, has an extra wall across it. Several pieces of clay found with iron slag indicate that the people who lived there may have smelted iron. |
| Burrington Camp | Bronze Age; Iron Age | 1011261 | | Burrington Combe; 51.3214°N 2.7505°W | Archaeological discoveries of early cemeteries show that humans occupied the combe and its caves from the Bronze Age with some evidence of occupation during the Upper Palaeolithic period. There is also a sub-rectangular Iron Age univallate hillfort. |
| Bury Castle | Iron Age | 1008808 | | Selworthy; 51.2132°N 3.5511°W | Bury Castle is a promontory fort that encloses an area of 0.2 hectares (0.49 acres). The main enclosure is encompassed by a single rampart and ditch, with steep drops on the north, east, and south sides. There is an additional rampart 30 metres (98 ft) to the west, with a deep ditch. The rampart is brevetted with drystone walling. |
| Cadbury Camp | Iron Age; Bronze Age; Neolithic Period | 1008295 | | Tickenham; 51.4485°N 2.7868°W | Cadbury Camp is an Iron Age hillfort that encloses around 28,000 square metres (7 acres). The banks surrounding this site are around 3.0 metres (10 ft) to 3.7 metres (12 ft) above the neighbouring ditches. A Romano-British shrine, a Bronze Age spearhead, and Neolithic flake tools have been found inside the hillfort. |
| Cadbury Castle Cadbury, Camalet, Cadenbyrig | 500 and 200 BC | 1011980 | | South Cadbury; 51.0241°N 2.5318°W | Cadbury Castle was fortified into a hillfort somewhere between 500 and 200 BC, and it encloses an area of 8 hectares (80,000 m^{2}). The site is associated with King Arthur's supposed court at Camelot. |
| Cadbury Hill Cadbury-Congresbury | Iron Age | 1011258 | – | Congresbury; 51.3804°N 2.8032°W | This hillfort is known, in archaeological circles, as Cadbury-Congresbury in order to differentiate it from the Cadbury Castle. It appears to have been constructed during the Iron Age, and the remains of Iron Age roundhouses may still be seen inside. The hillfort was refortified around 400 BC and occupation extended into the sub-Roman period, from which much imported pottery has been recovered. It has been suggested that this was the monastery of Saint Congar after whom Congresbury was named. |
| Cambria Farm | Bronze Age | – | – | Ruishton; 51.0160°N 3.0606°W | Cambria Farm is the site of a burned Bronze Age mound and Iron Age roundhouses. |
| Cannington Camp Cynwit Castle | Bronze Age and Iron Age | 1006225 | | Cannington; 51.1588°N 3.0796°W | Cannington Camp is a univallate hillfort with walls that have been almost entirely destroyed. Archaeological artefacts such as stone scrapers, cores, and flakes have been found at the site. |
| Castle Neroche hillfort | 1st millennium BC | 1008252 | | Staple Fitzpaine; 50.9370°N 3.0374°W | There are several bank-and-ditch earthworks near Castle Neroche, indicating the presence of a hillfort at some point during the 1st millennium BC. |
| Castles Camp The Castles | Iron Age | 1019150 | – | Bathealton; 51.0117°N 3.3449°W | Univallate hillfort with a slightly inturned entrance. |
| Clatworthy Camp | Iron Age | 1006149 | – | Wiveliscombe; 51.0743°N 3.3652°W | Clatworthy Camp is an Iron Age hillfort situated on a promontory of the Brendon Hills above Clatworthy Reservoir. It is roughly triangular in shape with an area of 5.8 hectares (14 acres). It has a single bank and ditch, cut through solid rock. There may have been an entrance on the west and two on the east. |
| Cleeve Toot Cleeve Hill hillfort | Iron Age | 1011263 | | Cleeve; 51.3878°N 2.7731°W | Cleeve Toot, close to the village of Cleeve, is a roughly oval settlement which is approximately 125 metres (410 ft) in length by 90 metres (300 ft) in breadth. Approximately 150 metres (490 ft) to the north is another, smaller settlement. |
| Conygar hillfort | Iron Age | 1007918 | – | Portbury; 51.4732°N 2.7223°W | Conygar hillfort is a small Iron Age univallate hillfort. The fort is triangular in shape and there are the remains of a three-foot high bank on the south-western side. There is a round barrow in the centre of the fort. |
| Cow Castle | Iron Age | 1002955 | | Exford; 51.1226°N 3.7253°W | Cow Castle is an Iron Age hillfort occupying an isolated hilltop and has a single rampart and ditch, enclosing 0.9 hectares (2.2 acres). It is in the valley of the River Barle. |
| Long Wood Enclosure | Iron Age | 1008255 | – | Dunster; 51.1536°N 3.4580°W | Univallate hillside enclosure, interior damaged by forestry plantation. |
| Curdon Camp | Iron Age | 1006158 | – | Stogumber; 51.1387°N 3.2850°W | Curdon Camp has been almost completely destroyed by quarrying and bulldozing. A section remains that is still 2.5 metres (8.2 ft) high on the southern and western sides. |
| Dinghurst fort | Iron Age | – | – | Churchill; 51.3347°N 2.7982°W | Dinghurst fort is the possible site of an Iron Age univallate hillfort. Close to Dolebury Warren. |
| Dolebury Warren Dolebury Camp | Iron Age | 1008184 | | Churchill; 51.3265°N 2.7907°W | Dolebury Camp is a hillfort located on a ridge in the Mendip Hills 154 feet (47 m) above the surrounding area. The walls enclose an area of 9 hectares (22 acres), with the maximum height of 30 feet (9 m) on the northern side. |
| Dowsborough Dowsborough Castle hillfort Dowsborough Camp or Danesborough or Dawesbury | Iron Age | 1010494 | | Holford; 51.1454°N 3.2015°W | Dowsborough is an oval univallate hillfort. The surrounding bank is around 1 metre (3.3 ft) to 1.5 metres (4.9 ft) wide and around 1.2 metres (3.9 ft) high. There is a ditch outside the bank, and the distance from the bottom of the ditch to the top of the bank is around 2 metres (6.6 ft) to 3 metres (9.8 ft). Near the entrance to the hillfort are two structures that are probably gatehouses. |
| Dundon Hill Hillfort | Iron Age | 1014715 | | Compton Dundon; 51.0868°N 2.7381°W | Dundon Hill hillfort is an Iron Age hillfort guarded by a single bank ranging from .5 metres (1.6 ft) to 2.5 metres (8.2 ft) high. Flint flakes, Bronze Age pottery, and Iron Age pottery have also been found. |
| Elborough Hill | Iron Age | – | – | Hutton; 51.3202°N 2.9062°W | Elborough Hill is the site of a bivallate hillfort, oval in shape, and defined by a triple bank on the northern side and a double out-turned bank on the southern side. |
| Elworthy Barrows | Iron Age | 1020724 | | Brompton Ralph; 51.0959°N 3.3295°W | Elworthy Barrows is a heavily damaged circular hillfort which had never been finished. It was ploughed multiple times until around 1943, when artifacts were discovered. |
| Glastonbury Lake Village | Iron Age | 1006156 | | Glastonbury; 51.1633°N 2.7264°W | Glastonbury Lake Village is an Iron Age lake village in Glastonbury. Each house was built on its own mound of clay in the lake, starting around 250 BC and continuing for at least 150 years. The entire settlement is surrounded by a pallisade made of timbers. |
| Glastonbury Tor | Stone Age | 1019390 | | Glastonbury; 51.1446°N 2.7004°W | Paleolithic, Mesolithic, and Neolithic flint tools have been found at Glastonbury Tor, which indicates that the site may have been occupied in the Stone Age. It is very close to the Glastonbury Lake Village, which was occupied in the Iron Age, starting around 250 BC. |
| Grabbist Hillfort | Iron Age | 1021060 | – | Dunster; 51.1832°N 3.4565°W | Oval shape measuring 886 feet (270 m) by 220 feet (67 m), surrounded by a bank and ditch. |
| Ham Hill Hillfort | Iron Age | 1003678 | | Ham Hill; 50.9483°N 2.7416°W | The Iron Age hillfort located on Ham Hill, called Ham Hill Hillfort, is possibly the largest hillfort in Somerset. It measures 800 metres (2,600 ft) by 950 metres (3,120 ft), enclosing an area of 81 hectares (200 acres). Ham Hill hillfort is surrounded by banks, some of which range up to 12 metres (39 ft) high, and ditches. In addition to the Iron Age hillfort, the site was occupied during the Mesolithic Period, the Neolithic Period, and the Bronze Age. The site has also been damaged by quarrying. |
| Highbury Hill | Iron Age | – | – | Clutton; 51.3194°N 2.5243°W | On Highbury Hill lies the earthwork remains of an Iron Age univallate hillfort. It occupies an area of woodland at the end of a narrow ridge. |
| Horse Pool Camp Harbury Hamberry Whitestaunton Camp | Iron Age | 1018636 | – | Whitestaunton; 50.8763°N 3.0453°W | Oval univallate hillfort 300 m long and 150 m wide. |
| Kenwalch's Castle | Iron Age | 1008257 | | Penselwood; 51.1006°N 2.3619°W | Kenwalch's Castle is an Iron Age hillfort. The latter has an area of 1.6 hectares (4.0 acres). There is a single rampart and ditch which are well preserved in places. The road north from Penselwood village crosses the hillfort and probably passes through the original entrances. |
| King's Castle | Iron Age | 1008807 | – | Wells; 51.2084°N 2.6191°W | King's Castle is the remains of an Iron Age settlement and field system. |
| King's Castle hillfort Castle Hill hillfort | Iron Age | 1016498 | | Wiveliscombe; 51.0460°N 3.2895°W | King's Castle hillfort is guarded by two banks and a ditch. The interior bank is from 2.5 metres (8.2 ft) to 6 metres (20 ft) high and around 14 metres (46 ft) thick. Several Neolithic artefacts have also been found on the site. |
| Kingsdown Camp | Iron Age | 1006219 | – | Buckland Dinham; 51.2642°N 2.4034°W | Kingsdown Camp is a univallate hillfort with an area of .15 hectares (0.37 acres), and is approximately quadrilateral in shape. In the Iron Age or Roman period a drystone wall was constructed, possibly 4 metres (13 ft) high and 2.5 metres (8 ft) wide. There is an entrance on the northeast side. The fort continued to be used by the Romans. |
| Maesbury Castle | Iron Age | 1015494 | | Croscombe; 51.2227°N 2.5598°W | The Maesbury Castle hillfort is a bivallate hillfort with a bank around 1.5 metres (4.9 ft) to 3 metres (9.8 ft) high enclosing an area of around 2.8 hectares (6.9 acres). A second bank around 30 centimetres (0.98 ft) high exists on the southeastern side. |
| Maes Knoll Maes Trump | Iron Age | 1005424 | | Norton Malreward; 51.3916°N 2.5763°W | Maes Knoll hillfort is roughly triangular, and encloses an area of 8 hectares (20 acres). |
| Meare Lake Village | Iron Age | 1006160 | – | Meare; 51.1760°N 2.7944°W | Archaeologists uncovered several hearths in the buried ruins of one of the houses at the Iron Age Meare Lake Village, which was located within the now-drained Meare Pool. They also found several lias stones lying around the fire, including one vertical stone which may have been a backrest. The archaeologists also found several artefacts, including cut pieces of red deer antler, pieces of iron, the rim of a bronze bowl, a spiral finger ring made from bronze, and a decorated amber bead. |
| Mounsey Castle | Iron Age | 1021357 | | Dulverton; 51.0540°N 3.5922°W | An irregular triangular earthwork of 1.75 hectares (4.3 acres) surrounded by the remains of coursed stone walling, with an entrance to the west. Overlooking the River Barle. |
| Norton Camp Norton Fitzwarren hillfort | Stone Age; Bronze Age | 1008467 | | Norton Fitzwarren; 51.0304°N 3.1479°W | The Norton Fitzwarren hillfort is part of the "Norton Hillfort Local Nature Reserve" and originally was occupied during the Stone Age and into the Bronze Age. |
| Oldberry Castle Oldbury Castle | Iron Age | 1006168 | | Dulverton; 51.0428°N 3.5572°W | Oldberry Castle is an irregular oval shape measuring 220 metres (720 ft) by 91 metres (299 ft). It is defended by a bank measuring 3 metres (9.8 ft) wide and 1.8 metres (5.9 ft) high, and a 5.5 metres (18 ft) wide ditch. |
| Plainsfield Camp | Iron Age | 1007669 | | Aisholt; 51.1192°N 3.1687°W | Plainsfield Camp is a possible Iron Age univallate settlement that is shaped like a rhombus. It is around 160 metres (540 ft) by 140 metres (450 ft), enclosing an approximate area of .1 hectares (1,000 m^{2}), with a single bank around 3.0 metres (10 ft) high. |
| Road Castle | Iron Age | 1021360 | – | Winsford; 51.1261°N 3.6264°W | It is likely that the bank and ditch defined enclosure at this site is of Iron Age date. |
| Roddenbury Hillfort | Iron Age | 1008804 | | Selwood; 51.1944°N 2.2897°W | Roddenbury hillfort is a large, univallate hillfort enclosing .84 hectares (2.1 acres). |
| Rodhuish Common | Iron Age | 1021122 | – | Withycombe; 51.1435°N 3.4323°W | On Rodhuish Common is a small oval enclosure which is thought to be of Iron Age date. |
| Ruborough Camp Rowberrow Rowborough Roborough Money Field | Iron Age | 1007670 | | Broomfield; 51.0956°N 3.1038°W | The Ruborough Camp hillfort is on an easterly spur from the main Quantock ridge, with steep natural slopes to the north and south-east. The fort is triangular in shape, with a single rampart and ditch (univallate), enclosing 1.8 hectares (4.4 acres). There is a linear outer work about 120 metres (390 ft) away, parallel to the westerly rampart, enclosing another 1.8 hectares (4.4 acres). There was a tunnel, which has now been filled in, which gave the camp safe access to a nearby spring for water. |
| Sigwells | Bronze Age; Iron Age | – | – | Charlton Horethorne; 51.012°N 2.507°W | Sigwells Camp overlooks Cadbury Castle. It was the target of research by the South Cadbury Environs Project, which produced significant Early Bronze Age and Middle and Late Iron Age archaeology. Of national importance was the identification of the earliest known metalworking building in Britain, dated to Middle Bronze Age (12th century BC). |
| Small Down Knoll Small Down Camp | Bronze Age | 1006175 | | Evercreech; 51.1646°N 2.4790°W | Small Down Camp is a multivallate hillfort enclosing 2 hectares (4.9 acres). There is also a group of around 14 barrows within the walls of the camp. Multiple walls and a ditch defend the site, but the walls are crumbling and the ditch has been filled up. |
| Solsbury Hill Little Solsbury Hill | Iron Age | 1002481 | | Batheaston; 51.4100°N 2.3342°W | Occupied between 300 BC and 100 BC, comprising a triangular area enclosed by a single univallate rampart, faced inside and out with well-built dry stone walls and infilled with rubble. The rampart was 6 metres (20 ft) wide and the outer face was at least 4 metres (13 ft) high. The top of the hill was cleared down to the bedrock, then substantial huts were built with wattle and daub on a timber-frame. After a period of occupation, some of the huts were burnt down, the rampart was overthrown, and the site was abandoned, never to be reoccupied. This event is probably part of the Belgic invasion of Britain in the early part of the 1st century BC. |
| Stantonbury Camp | Iron Age | 1002487 | | Marksbury; 51.3719°N 2.4718°W | Stantonbury Camp is an Iron Age hillfort close to Wansdyke. On the English Heritage Heritage at Risk Register. |
| Stokeleigh Camp | Iron Age | 1008113 | | Leigh Woods; 51.4570°N 2.6361°W | Evidence shows that Stokeleigh Camp in Leigh Woods was a key site in the defence of the Avon Gorge. It is situated on a promontory. |
| Sweetworthy | Iron Age | 1008470 | – | Luccombe; 51.1709°N 3.5891°W | Sweetworthy is an Iron Age hillfort or enclosure on the north-facing slope of Dunkery Hill. It has a single rampart and external ditch, enclosing 0.25 hectares (0.62 acres). The rampart is still visible and the ditch on the east side is used as a trackway. |
| Taps Combe Camp Chelvey Batch Settlement | Iron Age | 1007909 | – | Chelvey; 51.3996°N 2.7489°W | Taps Combe Camp is a Roman, Iron Age univallate hillfort in Chelvey. It is D-shaped, and is approximately 50 metres (160 ft) by 50 metres (160 ft). |
| Tedbury Camp | Iron Age | 1006163 | | Great Elm; 51.2378°N 2.3681°W | Tedbury Camp is a multivallate promontory hillfort defended by two parallel banks. The inner bank measuring 1.3 metres (4.3 ft) wide and standing 3 metres (9.8 ft) to 4.5 metres (15 ft) high. There may have been a third bank. Also the site of Roman occupation and a coin hoard. |
| Trendle Ring | Iron Age | 1008249 | | Bicknoller; 51.1470°N 3.2623°W | Trendle Ring is a univallate hillfort shaped like a rounded quadrilateral, enclosing around .7 hectares (1.7 acres). It is enclosed by a ring of stones up to around 1.5 metres (4.9 ft) high and still further by a ditch. |
| Tunley Camp | Iron Age | 1004525 | – | Camerton; 51.3309°N 2.4561°W | Tunley Camp comprises the slight earthwork remains of a univallate Iron Age hillfort, which is now nearly ploughed down. |
| Wadbury Camp | Iron Age | 1006162 | – | Mells; 51.2391°N 2.3803°W | A promontory fort or univallate hillfort with earthwork remains. The bank in places is up to 16 feet (4.9 m) high. Other parts have been almost completely destroyed. |
| Wain's Hill | Iron Age | 1007908 | | Clevedon; 51.4317°N 2.8781°W | Wain's Hill is an Iron Age promontory bivallate hillfort visible as linear earthwork banks and ditches. It lies on a triangular spit of land on Wain's Hill in west Clevedon, and the hillfort is defined by steep natural slopes to the south, north, and west, and by two ramparts to the east. |
| Walton Common banjo enclosure | Iron Age | 1007917 | – | Walton in Gordano; 51.4597°N 2.8240°W | A banjo enclosure believed to date from the late Iron Age. |
| Westbury Camp | Iron Age | 1015500 | – | Rodney Stoke; 51.2570°N 2.7294°W | Westbury Camp is a large, irregularly-shaped hillfort surrounded by a bank and ditch covering approximately 2.3 hectares (5.7 acres). |
| Worlebury Camp | Iron Age | 1011260 | | Worlebury Hill; 51.3574°N 2.9852°W | Worlebury Camp is an Iron Age hillfort that was designed for defence, as is evidenced by the number of walls and ditches around the site. Archaeologists have found several large triangular platforms around the sides of the fort, lower down on the hillside. They have found nearly one hundred storage pits of various sizes cut into the bedrock, and many of these had human remains, coins, and other artefacts in them. However, in more recent times, the fort has suffered damage and been threatened with complete destruction on multiple occasions. |
| Wraxall Camp | Iron Age | 1018267 | – | Failand; 51.4444°N 2.6913°W | This site, situated on level ground within an upland area of carboniferous limestone was an Iron Age defended settlement. |

== Suspected hillforts and settlements ==
List of suspected hillforts and ancient settlements in Somerset
| Site name Alternative name(s) | Age | National Heritage List for England number | Plan | Location | Description |
|---|---|---|---|---|---|
| Berwick | Iron Age | – | – | Bath; 51.3615°N 2.3742°W | Berwick is a possible multivallate Iron Age hillfort that has since been destroyed. A "camp" called Berwick, Berewyke, or Berewyck, adjoining Cottage Crescent and near Barrack Farm, was described in the early 19th century. |
| Charterhouse Camp | Neolithic; Bronze Age | 1006195 | | Charterhouse; 51.2986°N 2.7221°W | There is evidence, in the form of burials in local caves, of human occupation since the late Neolithic/Early Bronze Age. |
| Daw's Castle | Iron Age | 1020882 | | Watchet; 51.1810°N 3.3430°W | The Daw's Castle hillfort is situated on a north-facing cliff about 80 m above the sea, on a tapering spur of land bounded by the Washford River to the south, as it flows to the sea at Watchet, about 1 kilometre (0.62 mi) east. The ramparts of the fort would have formed a semicircle backing onto the sheer cliffs, but coastal erosion has reduced the size of the enclosure, and later destruction by farming, limekilns, and the B3191 road, have left only about 300 m of ramparts visible today. The fort may be of Iron Age origin, but was (re)built and fortified as a burh by King Alfred, as part of his defense against Viking raids from the Bristol Channel around 878 AD. |

== See also ==
- List of castles in Somerset
- List of hillforts in England
