= Elworthy Barrows =

Iron Age hillfort in Somerset, England

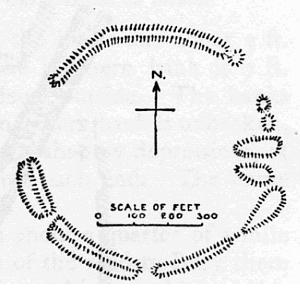
- Plan of Elworthy Barrows

- Location within Somerset
- 51°05′44″N 3°19′43″W
- Location: Brompton Ralph, Somerset, England.

History
- Built: Iron Age

Scheduled monument
- Reference no.: 188401

Elworthy Barrows is an unfinished Iron Age hill fort, rather than Bronze Age barrows, which is designated a scheduled ancient monument (No:188401). It is located in the civil parish of Brompton Ralph near Wiveliscombe, Somerset, England. It covers an area of 3.5 hectares (8.6 acres) and is surrounded by a bank and ditch.

== Background ==
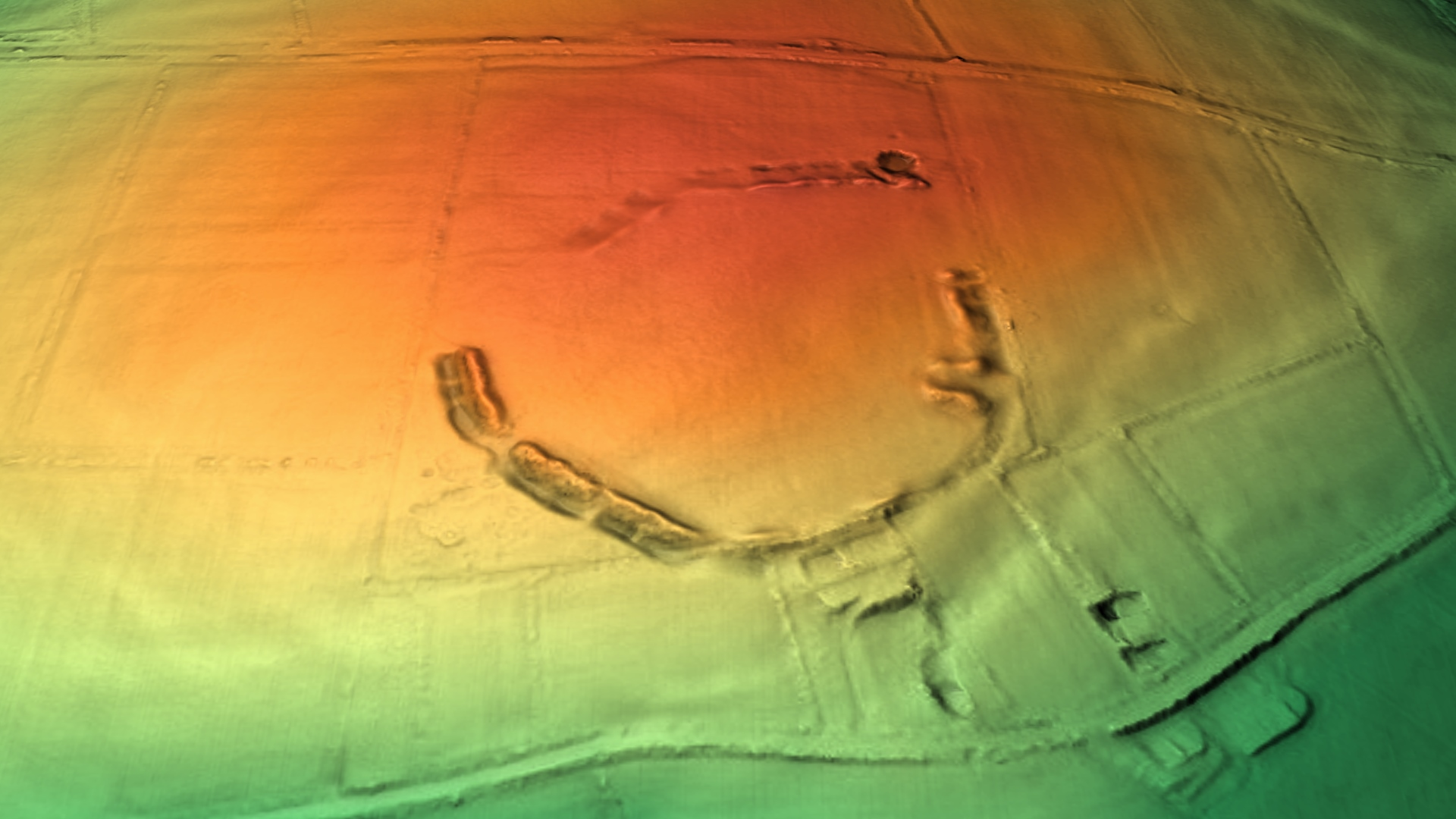
3D view of the digital terrain model

Hill forts developed in the Late Bronze and Early Iron Age, roughly the start of the first millennium BC. The reason for their emergence in Britain, and their purpose, has been a subject of debate. It has been argued that they could have been military sites constructed in response to invasion from continental Europe, sites built by invaders, or a military reaction to social tensions caused by an increasing population and consequent pressure on agriculture. The dominant view since the 1960s has been that the increasing use of iron led to social changes in Britain. Deposits of iron ore were located in different places to the tin and copper ore necessary to make bronze, and as a result trading patterns shifted and the old elites lost their economic and social status. Power passed into the hands of a new group of people. Archaeologist Barry Cunliffe believes that population increase still played a role and has stated "[the forts] provided defensive possibilities for the community at those times when the stress [of an increasing population] burst out into open warfare. But I wouldn't see them as having been built because there was a state of war. They would be functional as defensive strongholds when there were tensions and undoubtedly some of them were attacked and destroyed, but this was not the only, or even the most significant, factor in their construction".

== Construction ==
The hill fort is oval and 2.9 hectares in area. It was enclosed in the 1830s and laid to pasture and last ploughed around 1943. A polished stone axe was found at the site.

== World War II ==
During World War II searchlights were installed at the site, and in 1996 it was evaluated before the construction of a new communications mast.

== See also ==
- List of hill forts and ancient settlements in Somerset
