= Maynard Terrace =

Coordinates: 51.3296°N 2.5317°W

- Image of Maynard Terrace from around 1900
- Interactive map of the Maynard Terrace area
- Etymology: Maynard Greville

General information
- Type: Miner's cottages
- Location: Clutton, England

Maynard Terrace is a relatively untouched set of traditional miner's cottages with a unique history, built on the edge of the village of Clutton, Somerset by Francis Greville, 5th Earl of Warwick.

== History ==
Francis Greville owned the Clutton Collieries which were part of the Somerset Coalfield and many of his workers lived in Clutton. Local residents had organised and signed a petition pressing him to supply suitable accommodation for the miners. As Francis was anxious that his miners "should be able to get to work as dry as possible", he had a row of cottages built to accommodate them on Greyfield Colliery Road near the pit. In 1900 the cottages were completed and named after Maynard Greville, his 4th child, and colloquially known as Maynard's Terrace. Over time, the road name changed to Maynard Terrace.

The Earl's wife was Daisy Greville. She is usually best known as a long term mistress of Albert Edward, Prince of Wales, who later became King Edward VII and the inspiration behind the song Daisy, Daisy. However, she was also a staunch supporter of social reform and had a keen interest in the welfare of her husband’s employees and the children of Clutton. Both she and her husband were frequent visitors to Clutton. In 1902 she laid the foundation stone of the current village primary school and officially opened the school in 1903. Her school opening speech was reported in the Somerset Guardian and Radstock Observer. The report noted that she personally donated £5 to the school library and suggested that the building should be put to useful purpose in the evenings both social and recreative. It was her wish to see "the mining element represented on the managing authority of the school seeing that the majority of the children will come from that class of parent".

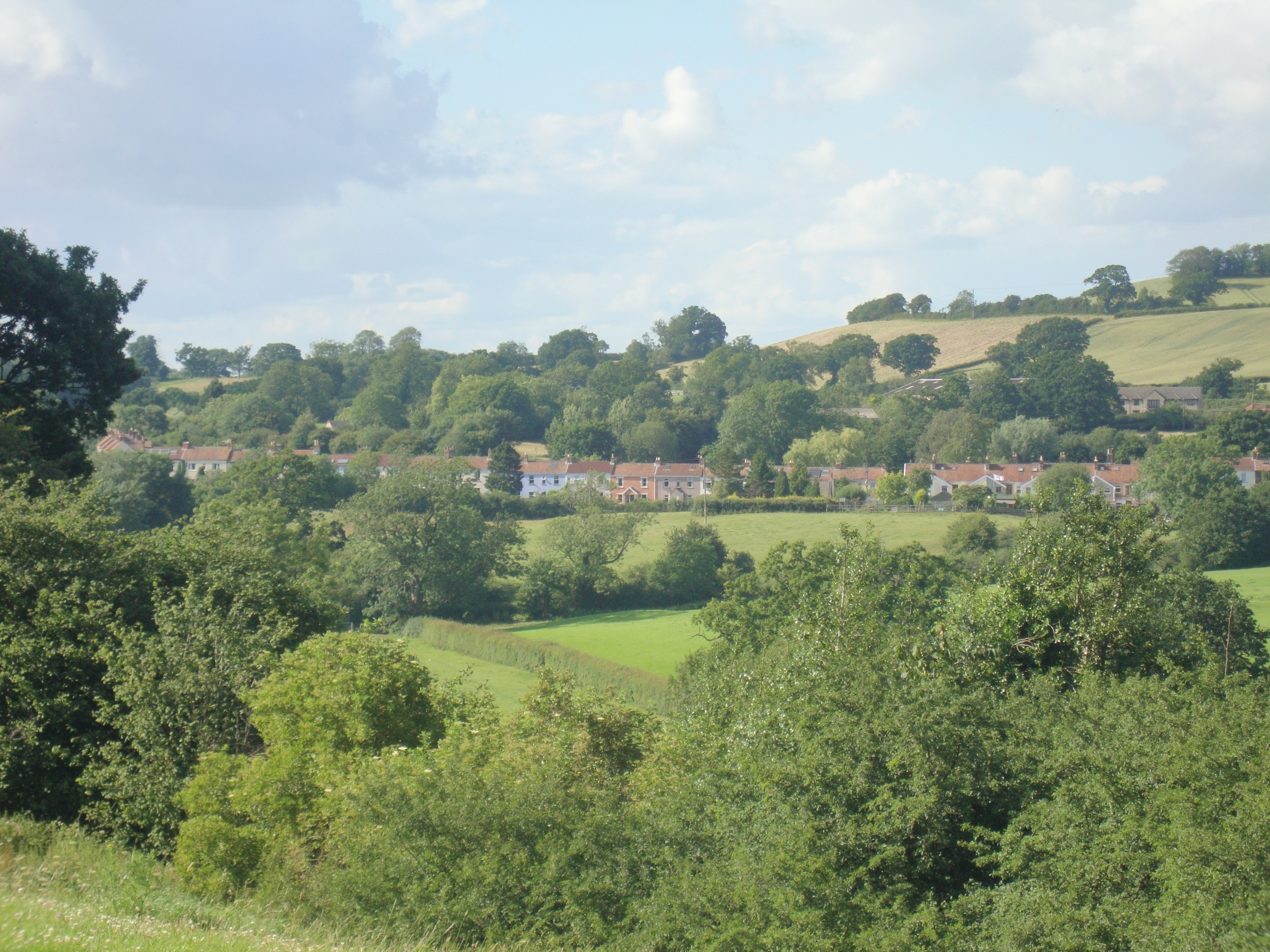
Image of Maynard Terrace from 2011

.

Maynard Terrace is bounded on one side by a disused railway siding that linked the Earl's Greyfield Colliery with the now disused Clutton mainline railway station, and on the other side by a set of fields containing historic bell pits. Mining in Clutton was first reported in 1610.

The engines used to move the coal along the siding were named Francis and Daisy, after the Earl and his wife.

The miners' cottages on Maynard Terrace are classed as undesignated heritage assets.

In 2013 outline planning application to build 36 new homes in an unused field opposite Maynard Terrace was approved.
