= Broomfield Camp =

Iron Age hillfort in Somerset, England

- Location within Somerset
- 51.0824°N 3.1199°W
- Location: Broomfield, Somerset, England

History
- Built: Bronze Age – Iron Age

Site notes
- Area: 15 acres (6.1 ha)

Scheduled monument
- Official name: Broomfield Camp

Broomfield Camp (which is also known as Higher Castles enclosure) is a univallate Iron Age hill fort in the Taunton Deane district of Somerset, England. The hill fort is situated approximately 0.6 miles (0.97 km) south-east from the village of Broomfield. Broomfield Camp dates from late prehistoric or Roman times. The camp was searched in 1968 and the result uncovered a trench through a bank and ditch which produced Iron Age pottery.

== Background ==
Hill forts developed in the Late Bronze and Early Iron Age, roughly the start of the first millennium BC. The reason for their emergence in Britain, and their purpose, has been a subject of debate. It has been argued that they could have been military sites constructed in response to invasion from continental Europe, sites built by invaders, or a military reaction to social tensions caused by an increasing population and consequent pressure on agriculture. The dominant view since the 1960s has been that the increasing use of iron led to social changes in Britain. Deposits of iron ore were located in different places to the tin and copper ore necessary to make bronze, and as a result trading patterns shifted and the old elites lost their economic and social status. Power passed into the hands of a new group of people. Archaeologist Barry Cunliffe believes that population increase still played a role and has stated "[the forts] provided defensive possibilities for the community at those times when the stress [of an increasing population] burst out into open warfare. But I wouldn't see them as having been built because there was a state of war. They would be functional as defensive strongholds when there were tensions and undoubtedly some of them were attacked and destroyed, but this was not the only, or even the most significant, factor in their construction".

== See also ==
- List of hill forts and ancient settlements in Somerset
