= St George's Church, Ruishton =

Church in Somerset, England

Church of St George
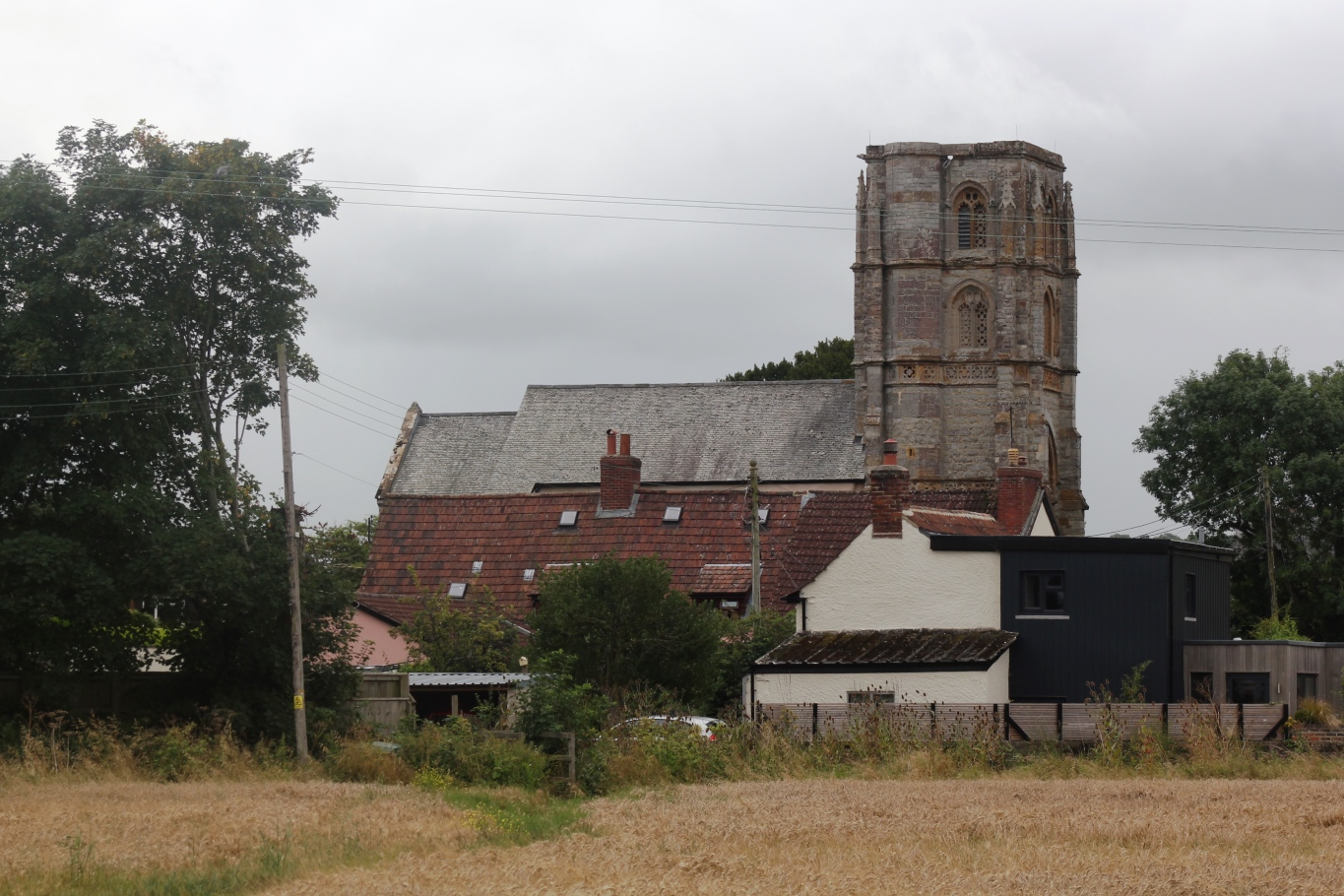

- Location within Somerset

General information
- Location: Ruishton, England
- Coordinates: 51.0206°N 3.0512°W
- Completed: 1549

The Church of St George in Ruishton, Somerset, England was built in the 14th to 16th centuries and has been designated as a grade I listed building.

The south chapel was built in the 14th and 15th centuries. Work started on the new church around 1533 and the roof above the nave was completed in 1549, although the tower, built in 1533, was never completed. It was built on the site of an earlier Norman church and some features can still be seen at the south door. Another remnant from the earlier church is the font which was carved in about 1380. A gallery in the church was removed during Victorian restoration in 1866.

In the churchyard is the remains of a 15th-century cross.

The Anglican parish is part of the benefice of Creech St Michael and Ruishton with Thornfalcon within the archdeaconry of Taunton.

== See also ==
- List of Grade I listed buildings in Taunton Deane
- List of towers in Somerset
- List of ecclesiastical parishes in the Diocese of Bath and Wells
