= Henry Charles Frank Morant =

Australian writer and photographer

Henry Charles Frank Morant (1885 – 28 October 1952) was an Australian writer and photographer. He was born at Dulverton, England and died at St Kilda, Victoria, Australia.

Whirlaway: a story of the ages was published in 1937. A young girl, Helen, and her pet koala, Tirri, were taken on an adventure through the ages of time by Whirlaway, an elf-like creature. The book was illustrated by Florence Jean Elder. Race Mathews believed that Whirlaway never gained the recognition that it deserved because its publication in England in 1937 coincided with the lead-up to World War II. Few copies of the book reached Australia, and the London stocks were destroyed in The Blitz. Mathews considered that the book would have become an enduring favourite.

Morant compiled an unpublished album of mounted photographs and documents on the Pioneers of Aviation. The manuscript is held by the National Library of Australia.

In December 1937, Morant was appointed publicity officer for the Ayrshire Cattle Herd Book Society of Australasia. He was the official photographer of some of the allied societies, and his photographs of livestock were acknowledged to be of a high standard. He was official photographer for the Kennel Control Council.
