= Church of St Mary, Brompton Ralph =

Church in Somerset, England

Church of St Mary
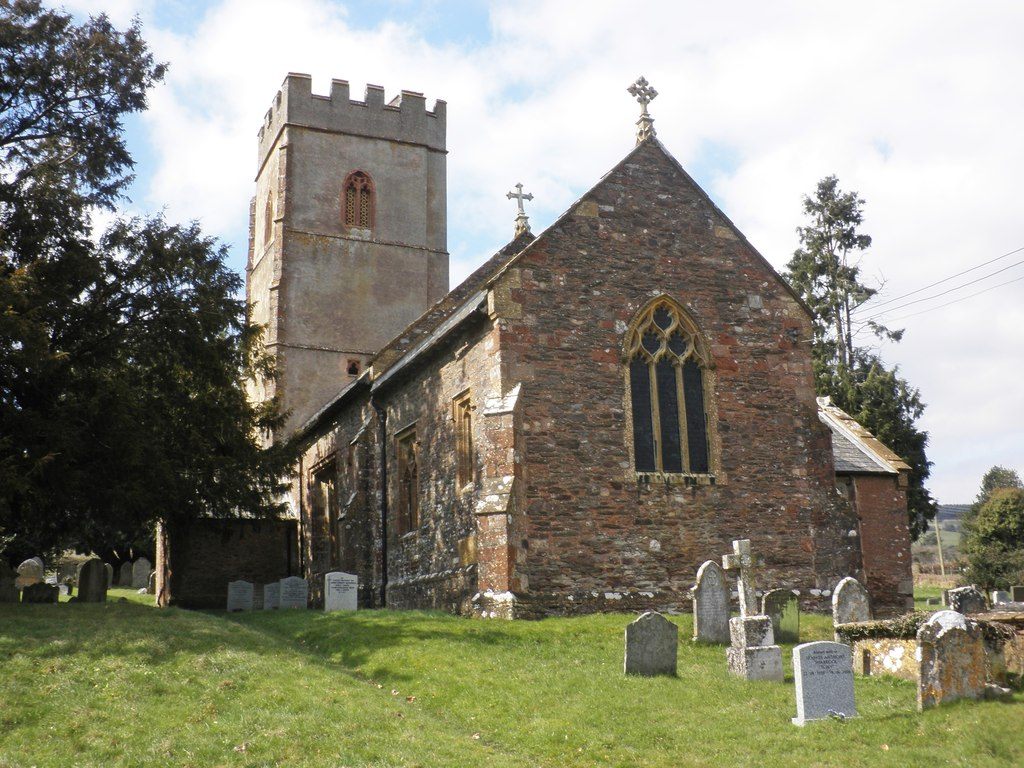

- Location within Somerset
- 51.0831°N 3.3076°W
- Location: Brompton Ralph, Somerset, England

History
- Built: 15th century

Listed Building – Grade II*
- Official name: Church of St Mary
- Designated: 22 May 1969
- Reference no.: 1057972

The Anglican Church of St Mary in Brompton Ralph, Somerset, England was built in the 15th century. It is a Grade II* listed building.

== History ==
Parts of the church, including the tower and south door are from the 15th century. The first church on the site was established by 1291. Other parts were rebuilt in the 16th century and again in 1738. The north aisle was added in 1847. The whole church underwent Victorian restoration in 1881. Further restoration of the church was carried out in 2013.

The parish is part of the Wiveliscombe and the Hills benefice within the Diocese of Bath and Wells.

== Architecture ==
The red sandstone building has a slate roof. It consists of a four-bay nave with a north aisle, chancel with barrel roof, south porch, and a vestry. The three-stage tower is supported by diagonal buttresses. The tower contains two bells from the 15th century and six bells in total.

Inside the church is a medieval rood screen which was partially restored by Frederick Bligh Bond. Most of the furniture and fittings are from the 16th century, including the font.

== See also ==
- List of ecclesiastical parishes in the Diocese of Bath and Wells
