= Church of All Saints, Dulverton =

Church in Somerset, England

Church of All Saints
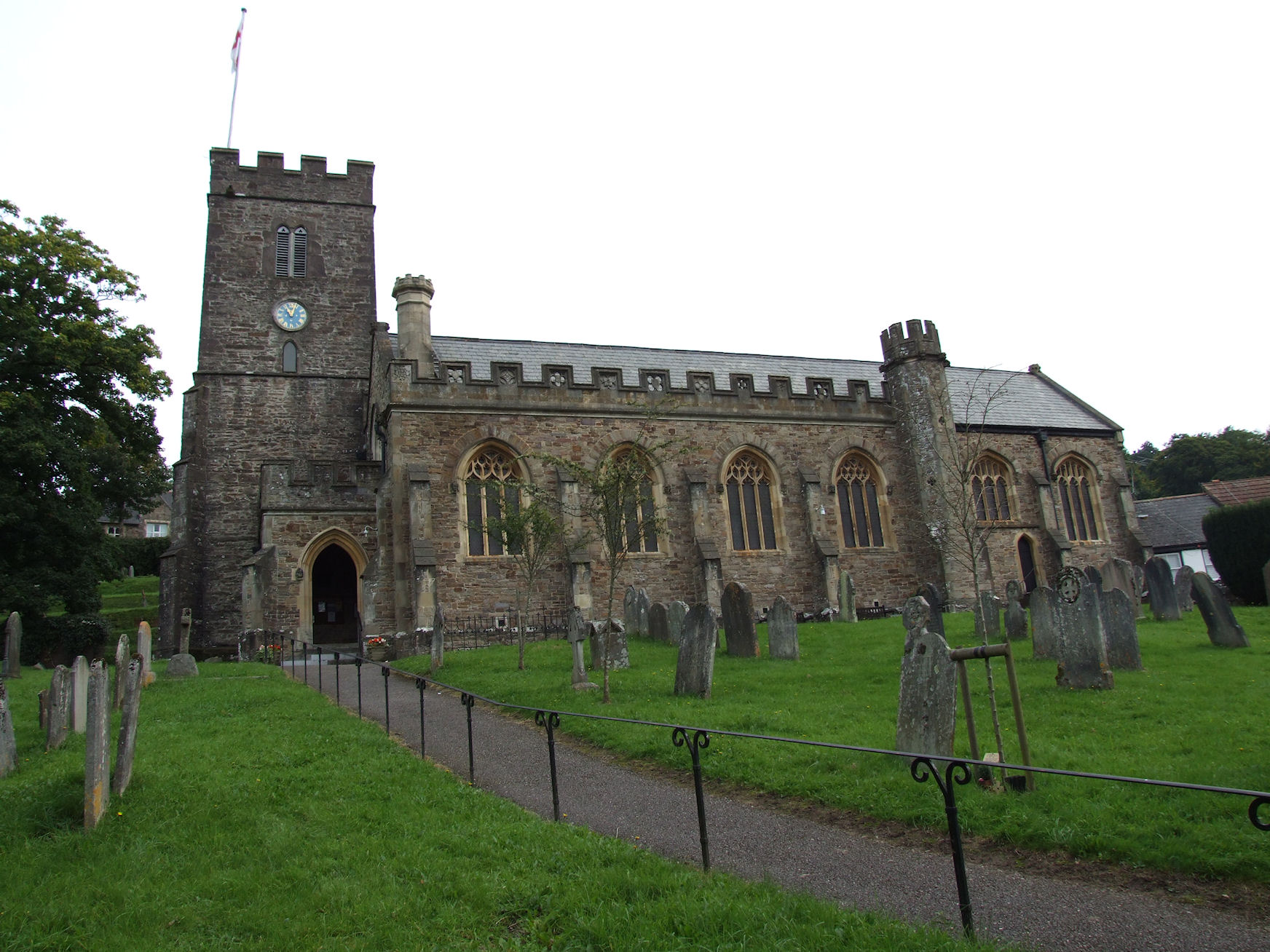

- Location within Somerset
- 51.0411°N 3.5496°W
- Location: Dulverton, Somerset, England

Listed Building – Grade II*
- Official name: Church of All Saints
- Designated: 6 April 1959
- Reference no.: 1247824

The Anglican Church of All Saints in Dulverton, Somerset, England was built in the 15th century and largely rebuilt in the 1850s. It is a Grade II* listed building.

== History ==
A church was recorded on the site by 1155 when it was squired by the Augustinians of Taunton Priory.

The tower of All Saints Church in Bank Square survives from the 15th-century building; however, the rest of the church was extensively restored between 1853 and 1855 when it was largely rebuilt by Edward Ashworth.

In 2012 the BBC Radio programme Any Questions? was broadcast from the church.

The parish is part of the benefice of Dulverton with Brushford, Brompton Regis, Upton and Withiel Florey within the Diocese of Bath and Wells.

== Architecture ==
The stone building has Hamstone dressings and a slate roof. The nave is of four bays. The three-stage west tower is supported by diagonal buttresses.

The interior of the church includes several tablets memorials and fittings from the church before its restoration including a royal coat of arms from 1714.

The churchyard is accessed via a lychgate from the town.

== See also ==
- List of ecclesiastical parishes in the Diocese of Bath and Wells
