= Briggins Moor =

- Site of Special Scientific Interest
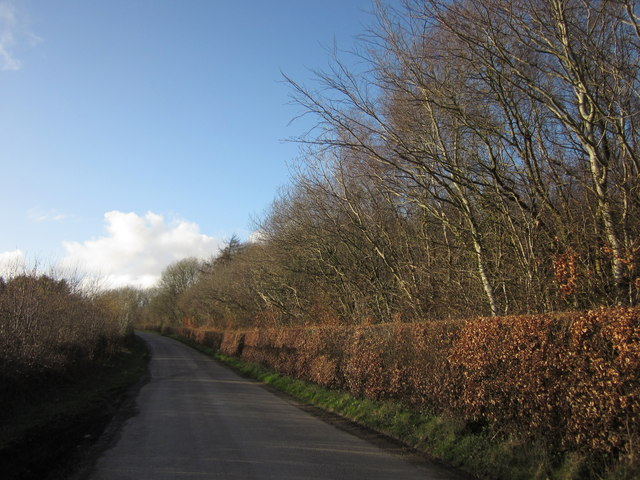

- Location within Somerset
- Location of Briggins Moor.
- Area of search: Somerset
- Grid reference: SS893250
- Coordinates: 51.01369°N 3.57944°W
- Interest: Biological
- Area: 37.8 hectares (0.378 km^{2}; 0.146 sq mi)
- Notification date: 1994

Briggins Moor is a 15.3 hectare biological Site of Special Scientific Interest in Somerset, notified in 1994. The site is south of Dulverton and close to the border with Devon.

This site is an example of unimproved mire of a type which is restricted to south-west England and Wales and which has been significantly reduced in extent in the recent past. Purple moor-grass (Molinia caerulea) and meadow thistle (Cirsium dissectum) are abundant. There is a large colony of the marsh fritillary butterfly (Eurodryas aurinia).
