= Burledge Hill =

Iron Age hillfort in Somerset, England

- Site of Special Scientific Interest
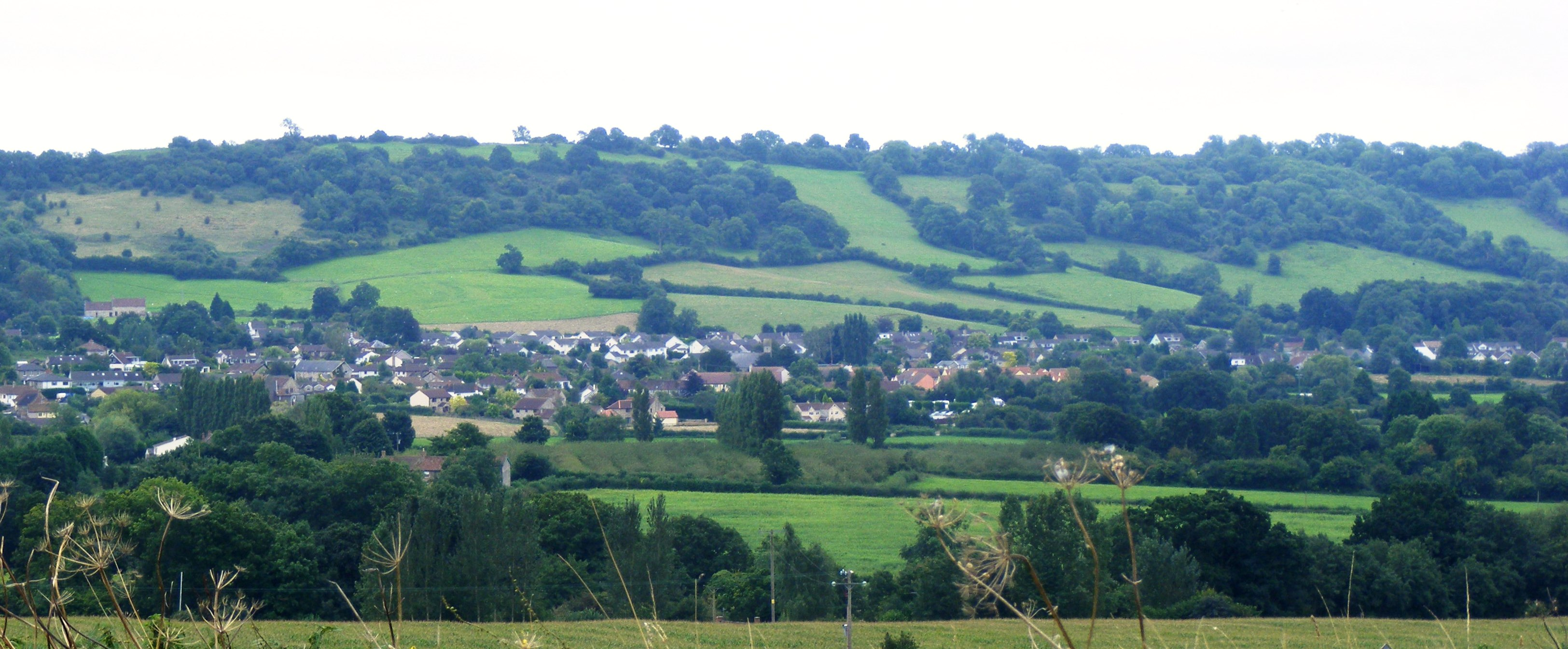

- Location within Somerset
- Location of Burledge Hill.
- Area of search: Avon
- Coordinates: 51°1′36″N 2°35′32″W
- Interest: Biological
- Area: 48.7 ha (0.487 km^{2}; 0.188 sq mi)
- Notification date: 2005

Burledge Hill is on the southern edge of the village of Bishop Sutton, Somerset, England. It is the site of a Site of Special Scientific Interest and an univallate Iron Age hillfort.

== Site of Special Scientific Interest ==
The site comprises a mixture of flower rich grassland, scrub and mature hedgerows. Three fields are designated as Burledge Sidelands and Meadows a Site of Nature Conservation Interest (SNCI), and, since November 2005, as a Site of Special Scientific Interest (SSSI) covering 48.7 ha the citation says:

Burledge Sidelands and Meadows is nationally important for a wide variety of species-rich unimproved neutral grassland communities characterised by crested dog's tail Cynosurus cristatus and common knapweed Centaurea nigra.

These form part of a 3 km horseshoe of unimproved neutral grassland running around the top of Burledge Hill, forming the largest known concentration of this habitat recorded in Avon. Plant species found on the site include cowslip, Alchemilla (lady's mantle), saw-wort and devil's bit scabious. Birds such as willow warbler (Phylloscopus trochilus), garden warbler (Sylvia borin) and whitethroat (Sylvia communis) can be heard singing from the scrub areas. The site also falls within the Mendip Hills Area of Outstanding Natural Beauty (AONB) and has commanding views of the Chew Valley.

== Hillfort ==
Hillforts developed in the Late Bronze and Early Iron Age, roughly the start of the first millennium BC. The reason for their emergence in Britain, and their purpose, has been a subject of debate. It has been argued that they could have been military sites constructed in response to invasion from continental Europe, sites built by invaders, or a military reaction to social tensions caused by an increasing population and consequent pressure on agriculture. The dominant view since the 1960s has been that the increasing use of iron led to social changes in Britain. Deposits of iron ore were located in different places to the tin and copper ore necessary to make bronze, and as a result trading patterns shifted and the old elites lost their economic and social status. Power passed into the hands of a new group of people. Archaeologist Barry Cunliffe believes that population increase still played a role and has stated "[the forts] provided defensive possibilities for the community at those times when the stress [of an increasing population] burst out into open warfare. But I wouldn't see them as having been built because there was a state of war. They would be functional as defensive strongholds when there were tensions and undoubtedly some of them were attacked and destroyed, but this was not the only, or even the most significant, factor in their construction".

Burledge hill fort is a univallate Iron Age hillfort. The site was investigated three times: in 1955 by the University of Bristol Spelaeological Society and in 1959 and 1966 by field investigation. In 1955, the excavating archaeologists found evidence of postholes, ditches, and pits inside the fort. They also found artefacts like a part of an iron fibula, animal bones, and pottery. One find which evidenced that metalworking was done at this site was the discovery of iron slag.

== See also ==
- List of hillforts in England
- List of hillforts and ancient settlements in Somerset
