= Wadbury Camp =

Promontory fort in Somerset, England

- Mells, Mendip district, Somerset in England

Site information
- Type: Promontory fort
- Condition: Overgrown

Location
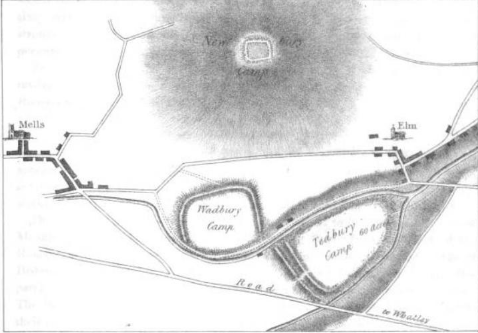
- 1836 diagram of Newbury Camp (north), Wadbury Camp (west), Tedbury Camp (east)
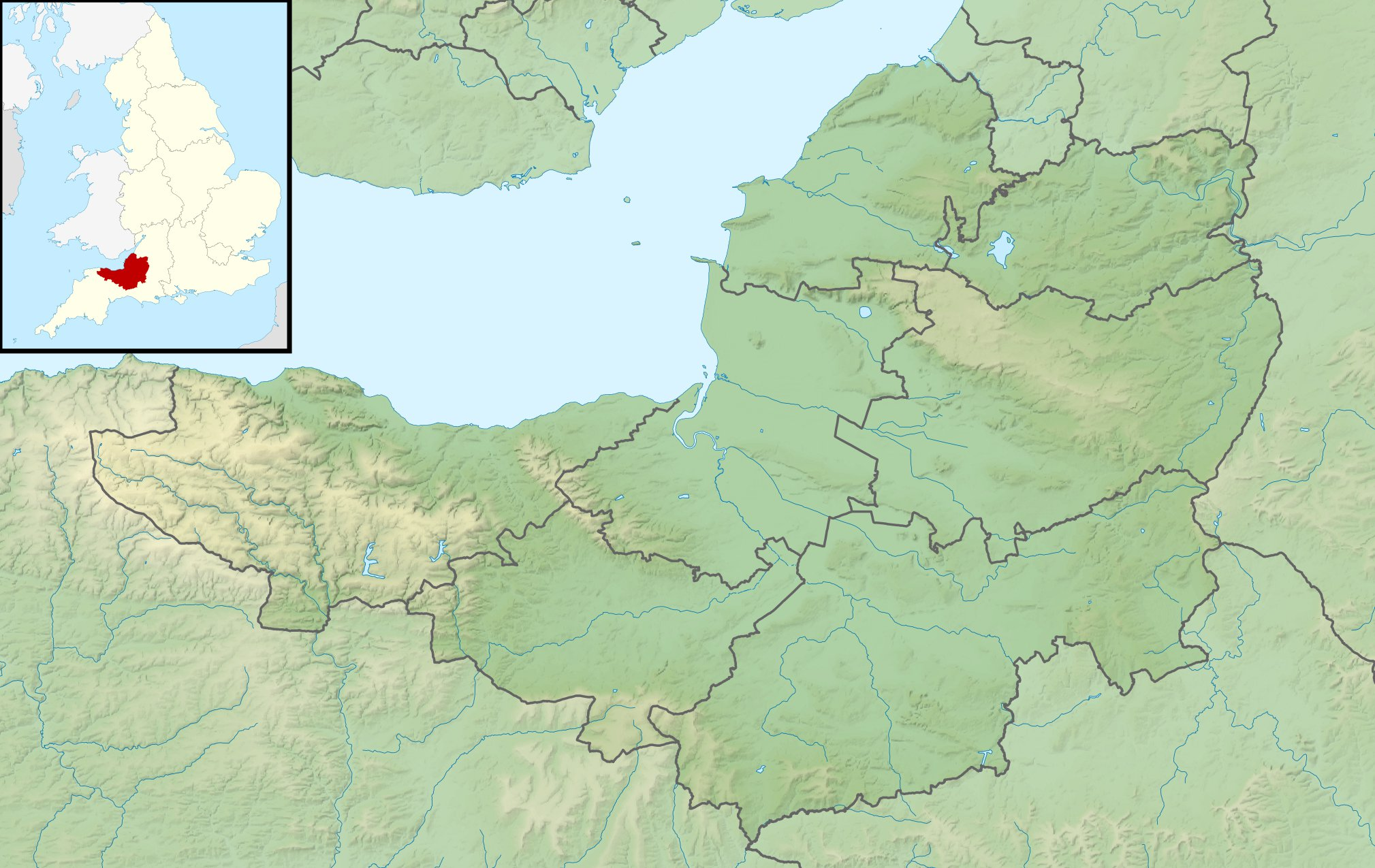
- 1836 diagram of Newbury Camp (north), Wadbury Camp (west), Tedbury Camp (east)
- Coordinates: 51.239561°N 2.377346°W

Site history
- Materials: Earth

Wadbury Camp is a promontory fort in Somerset, England that protected the mining district of the Mendip Hills in pre-Roman times. It seems to have been an outwork of the larger Tedbury Camp.

== Location ==
Wadbury camp lies on a ridge to the north of the steep valley of the Mells Stream, called the Wadbury Valley. It is south of Newbury camp and west of Tedbury Camp, which is on the other side of the river. Newbury Camp, on an elevated knoll 1 mile (1.6 km) north of Wadbury, would have been used as a look-out post over the surrounding countryside. Tedbury Camp, covering an area of 60 acres (24 ha), must have been an important stronghold. Wadbury Camp, on the opposite side of the Mells Stream, to the northwest of Tedbury, seems to have been an outpost of the larger camp.

== Description ==
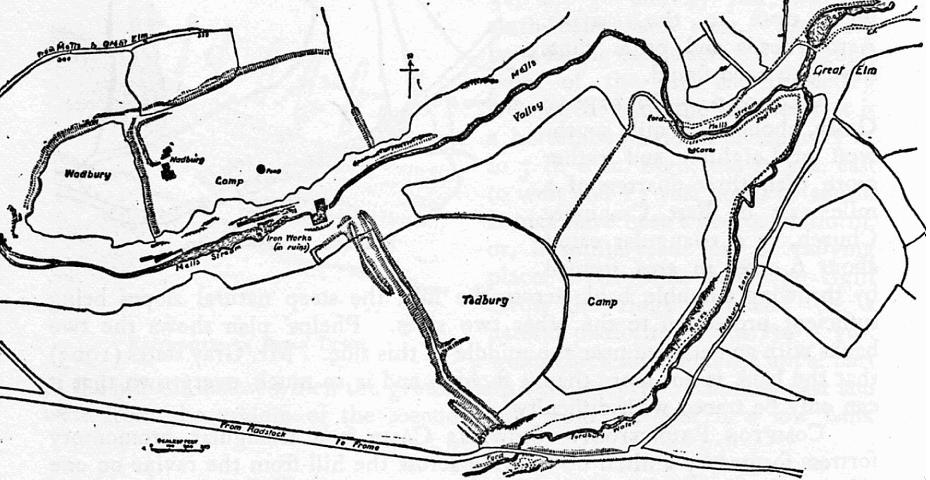
More recent diagram of Wadbury and Tedbury camps

The camp is a slight univallate hillfort, an elongated oval enclosure. It has a single rampart, outer ditch and counterscarp bank on all but the western side, where it is protected by the steep bank of the ravine. The bank would have been 16 feet (4.9 m) high, with a ditch that has a revetment of stones below its counterscarp. The sides of the ridge are steep to the north and precipitous to the south and west. The approach from the east is flat. A scarp on the north survives, above a stony bank. There is a strong double rampart on the eastern side, and traces of another, but this was largely destroyed when ornamental gardens were built. There may have been an entrance in the northwest, but in this area a farm track has partly destroyed the outer bank. The gazetteer lists the fort as covering 30 hectares (74 acres).

== History ==
Wadbury Camp dates to between 800 BC and 43 AD. Tedbury, Wadbury and Newbury guarded the Avon and Frome rivers, and defended the roads and approaches to the mining district of the Mendip Hills with its capital at Camalodunum long before the Roman Era.

The present Wadbury House was built within the old fortification. There is a bank running in a north-south direction through the middle of the fort, and a low bank to the northwest of the house, both of which are modern. Today Wadbury camp is a scheduled monument. The ramparts survive but are no more than 3 metres (9.8 ft) high, and in some places have been destroyed by quarries or buildings.

== Sources ==
- Phelps, William (1836), The History and Antiquities of Somersetshire: Being a General and Parochial Survey of that Interesting County. To which is Prefixed an Historical Introduction, with a Brief View of Ecclesiastical History; and an Account of the Druidical, Belgic-British, Roman, Saxon, Danish, and Norman Antiquities, Now Extant, J.B. Nichols and son
- "Wadbury Camp", Historic England
- "Wadbury camp: List Entry Summary", Historic England
- "Wadbury Hillfort, Wadbury", Ariadne
