= Cambria Farm =

- Location within Somerset
- 51°01′01″N 3°03′33″W
- Location: between Ruishton and Taunton, Somerset, England

History
- Built: 1000 BC to 400 AD

Cambria Farm is the site of a Bronze, Iron Age, Roman rural settlement, between Ruishton and Taunton, Somerset, England.

A survey of the site was carried by Context One in 2007 out prior to the construction of a Park and ride close to Junction 25 of the M5 motorway. In early 2009 further exploration and excavation was carried out. It uncovered Bronze Age burnt mounds, Middle Bronze Age and Late Iron Age roundhouses, and a field system established in the late Iron Age that remained in use until the 3rd or 4th century AD.

The evidence of human occupation was dated as between 1500 BC to 400 AD. The buildings included three possible rectilinear post-built structures and at least five roundhouses, one of which was 17 metres (56 ft) in diameter. A Roman field system and small inhumation cemetery containing 30 burials dating from the 2nd to 4th centuries AD was also discovered.

Finds from the site include a pair of iron shears, iron spear tips, animal bones, flint tools, loom weights, Iron Age and Roman brooches and Roman coins. They will be displayed in the Museum of Somerset. Examples of Glastonbury type pottery, and three Iron Age spearheads were also found.
