= Dulverton =

Town in Somerset, England

Coordinates: 51.046°N 3.550°W

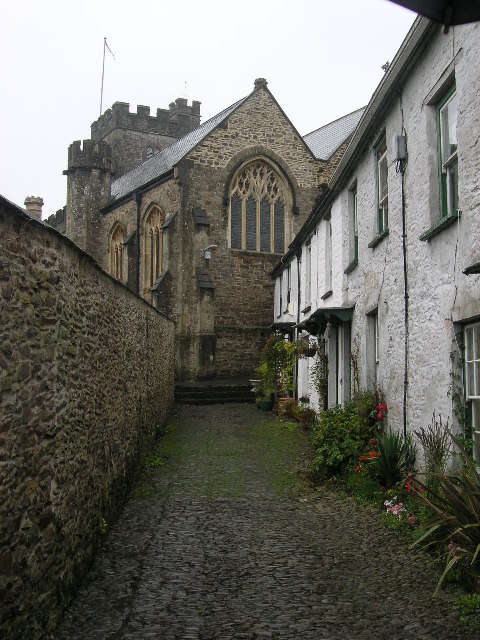
- Church of All Saints

- Location within Somerset
- Population: 1,408 (2011)
- OS grid reference: SS9128
- Civil parish: Dulverton
- Unitary authority: Somerset Council
- Ceremonial county: Somerset
- Region: South West
- Country: England
- Sovereign state: United Kingdom
- Post town: DULVERTON
- Postcode district: TA22
- Dialling code: 01398
- Police: Avon and Somerset
- Fire: Devon and Somerset
- Ambulance: South Western
- UK Parliament: Tiverton and Minehead

Dulverton is a town and civil parish in west Somerset, England, near the border with Devon. The town had a population of 1,408 at the 2011 Census. The parish includes the hamlets of Battleton and Ashwick which is located approximately 4 miles (6.4 km) north west of Dulverton.

To the west of the hamlet lies Ashwick House, built in the Edwardian style in 1901. Also nearby is the estate of Northmoor, formerly a seat of Sir Frederick Wills, 1st Baronet of Northmoor, one of the four Wills Baronetcys, and the founders of the Imperial Tobacco Company. In 1929 Sir Frederick's son and heir, Sir Gilbert Wills, 2nd Baronet, was raised to the peerage as Baron Dulverton, whose principal seat was at Batsford Park, near Batsford, Gloucestershire.

Dulverton is a popular tourist destination for exploring Exmoor, and is home to the Exmoor National Park Authority headquarters. The town lies on the route of the Exe Valley Way and Land's End Trail.

== Toponymy ==
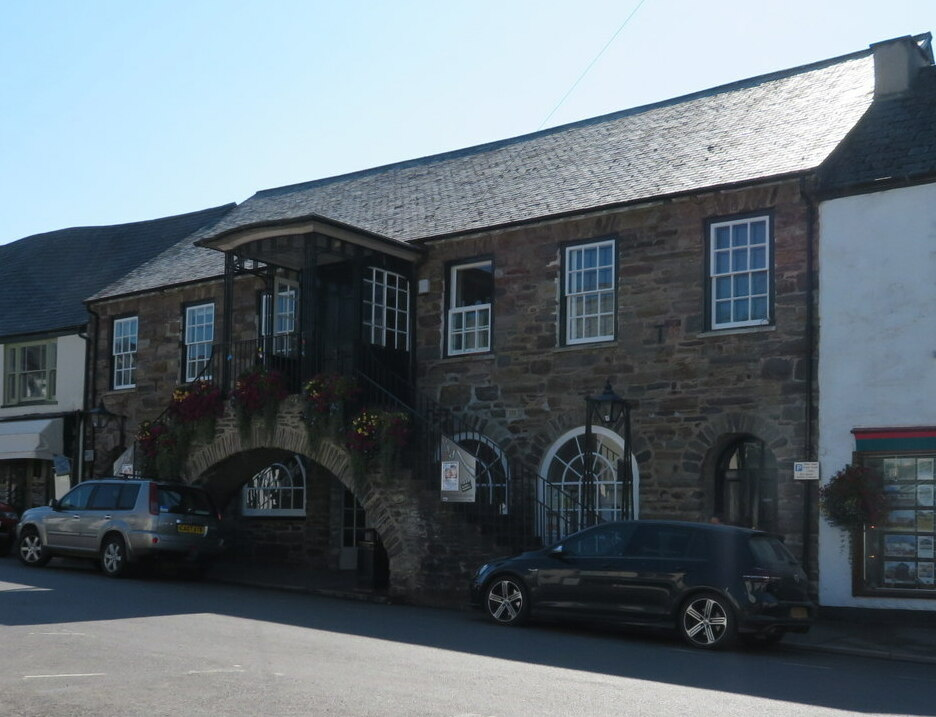
Dulverton Town Hall

The name Dulverton was first recorded in 1084 as dieglaford-tun meaning 'the settlement at the hidden ford'. The Domesday Book of 1086 records it as Dolvertune, and suggests it was a royal manor before the Norman Conquest.

The parish also once contained the place Tolchet, noted as one of the relatively rare examples of an English place with a name deriving from Common Brittonic. It seems to comprise the words found in modern Welsh as twll ('hole, cave') and coed ('woodland'), the name being paralleled by several Welsh places called Tyllgoed, the Cornish place-name Tolgus, and the now-lost Breton place-name Toulgoat, along with place-names in England including Olchard.

== History ==
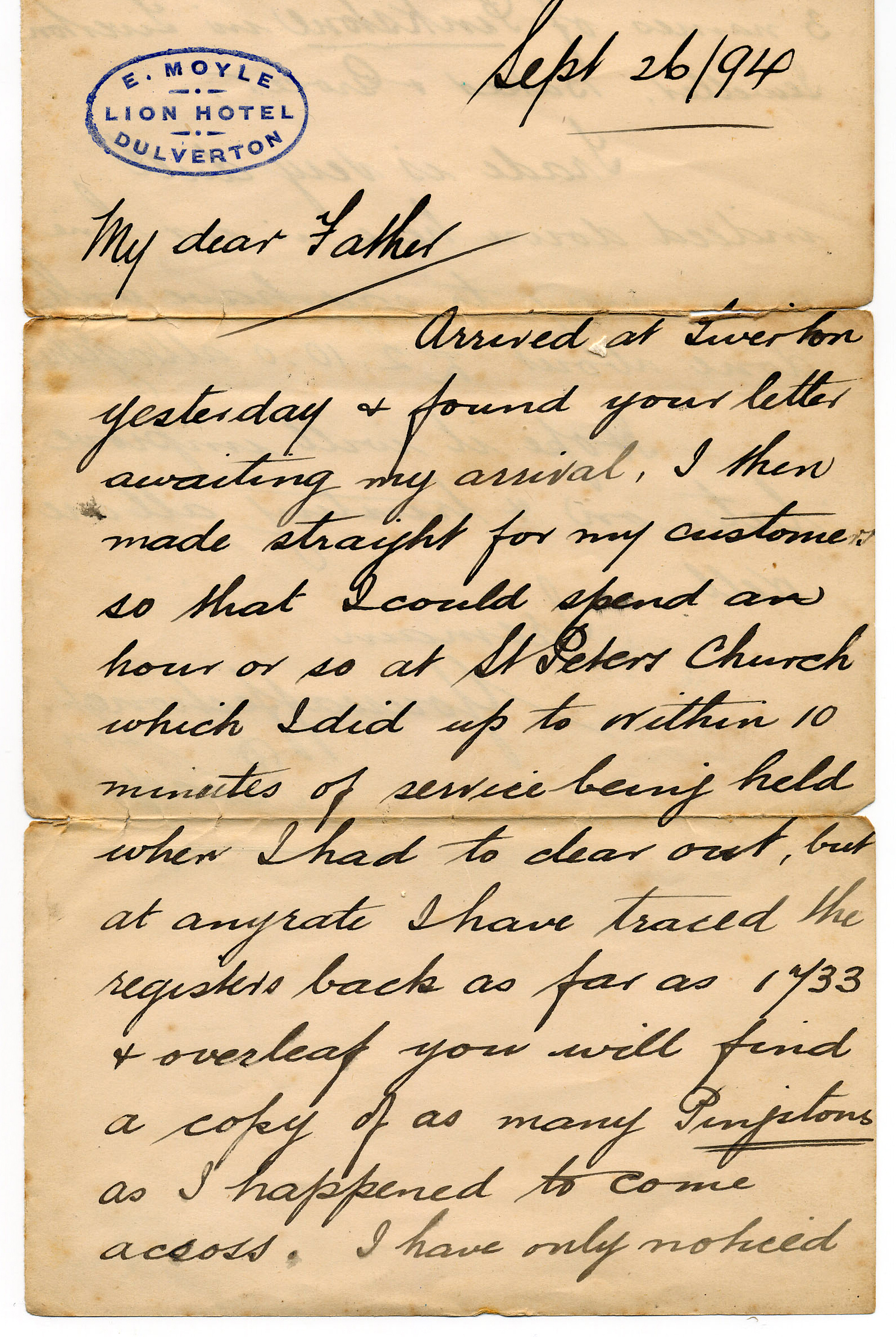
An 1894 letter from Dulverton

The town lies below the Iron Age hillforts of Oldberry Castle, Mounsey Castle and Brewer's Castle.

The manor was granted to the Turbervilles by William I and in the late 12th century they gave the church and some land to Taunton Priory. The remainder of the manor passed to the Shete family. The parish of Dulverton was part of the Williton and Freemanners Hundred.

The Middle Ages saw continued growth and the establishment of fairs and markets, with several small industries based upon the traditions of upland farming and the wool trade. These include related works such as laundries; originally used for the washing of sheep fleeces in the leats feeding the wide and fast-flowing River Barle, the surviving 19th-century industrial laundries continue to provide a service to surrounding businesses. The market house in Fore Street, which is believed to date from 1760, was re-modelled to become Dulverton Town Hall in 1866, with the porch and external double staircase being added in 1930 by Sir Albert Richardson.

The manor of Dulverton was purchased in 1568 by the Sydenham family seated at Combe House, on the opposite side of the River Barle to Dulverton, a junior branch of the ancient de Sydenham family which originated at the manor of Sydenham, near Bridgwater in Somerset, of which other branches were seated in Somerset at Combe Sydenham, Orchard Sydenham (later called Orchard Wyndham) and Brympton d'Evercy, which latter remained the seat of the Sydenham baronets, which title was created in 1641. In 1858 the Sydenhams sold the manor to the Earl of Carnarvon of Pixton Park, Dulverton. George Sydenham Clarke, 1st Baron Sydenham of Combe (1848–1933) took his title from Combe, Dulverton.

Exmoor House was built as the Dulverton Union Workhouse in 1855. It is now the headquarters of the Exmoor National Park Authority.

Dr Charles Palk Collyns (1793–1864) set up as a surgeon and apothecary in Dulverton in 1814. Dr Collyns moved into Bilboa House in 1820, where he authored The Chase of the Wild Red Deer; his grave stone is located at All Saints' Church in Dulverton.

Private housing stock generally ranges from medium-size to substantial Georgian to late Victorian family houses, with a small estate of post-war modern houses and bungalows to the east of the town centre.

== Governance ==
The town council (parish council) has responsibility for local issues, including setting an annual precept (local rate) to cover the council's operating costs and producing annual accounts for public scrutiny. The town council evaluates local planning applications and works with the local police, district council officers, and neighbourhood watch groups on matters of crime, security, and traffic. The town council's role also includes initiating projects for the maintenance and repair of parish facilities, as well as consulting with the unitary authority on the maintenance, repair, and improvement of highways, drainage, footpaths, public transport, and street cleaning. Conservation matters (including trees and listed buildings) and environmental issues are also the responsibility of the council.

The town falls within the unitary authority of Somerset, which was established on 1 April 2023 from the merger of Somerset County Council and four district authorities. It was previously in the non-metropolitan district of Somerset West and Taunton, which was established on 1 April 2019, having been in the district of West Somerset, which was formed on 1 April 1974 under the Local Government Act 1972, and before that in Dulverton Rural District. Somerset Council is responsible for the former district services including building control, local roads, council housing, environmental health, markets and fairs, refuse collection and recycling, cemeteries and crematoria, leisure services, parks, and tourism as well as county-level services such as education, social services, libraries, main roads, public transport, policing and fire services, trading standards, waste disposal and strategic planning.

As Dulverton falls within the Exmoor National Park some functions normally administered by district or county councils have, since 1997, fallen under the Exmoor National Park Authority, which is known as a 'single purpose' authority, which aims to "conserve and enhance the natural beauty, wildlife and cultural heritage of the National Parks" and "promote opportunities for the understanding and enjoyment of the special qualities of the Parks by the public", including responsibility for local planning and conservation of the natural and historic environment.

Dulverton is the most populous area of the electoral ward called 'Dulverton and District'. The ward stretches north from Dulverton to Winsford. The total population of the ward at the 2011 Census was 2,491.

It is also part of the Tiverton and Minehead county constituency represented in the House of Commons of the Parliament of the United Kingdom. It elects one Member of Parliament (MP) by the first past the post system of election.

== Geography ==
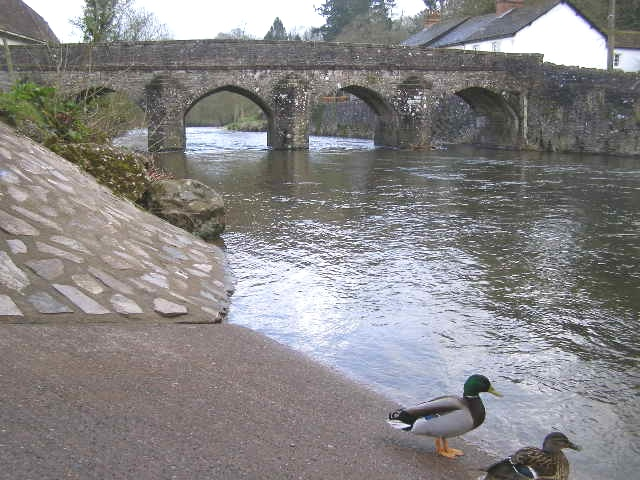
Barle Bridge

The town lies in the deep, wooded valley of the River Barle, at an ancient route convergence and river crossing. The river and the Barle Valley are both designated as biological Site of Special Scientific Interest. The river passes under the Tarr Steps, a prehistoric clapper bridge possibly dating from 1000 BC. The stone slabs weigh up to 5 tons each. According to local legend, they were placed by the devil to win a bet. The bridge is 180 feet (55 m) long and has 17 spans. It has been designated by English Heritage as a grade I listed building. The other bridges over the Barle include the five span Barle Bridge which is medieval in origin. It has double rings on the downstream side and single rings on the upstream side. It was repaired in 1624, and subsequently widened in 1819 by John Stone. It was further repaired in 1866 and in 1952–1953 after flood damage. The 18th-century Marsh Bridge was altered in 1866 when the central pier was removed and an iron bridge inserted. The parapet was destroyed in 1952 and reconstructed in steel in 1979. Towards Brushford the River Barle is crossed by the New Bridge dating from 1870, which led to Pixton Park, which was the home of John Dyke Acland and his wife Harriet Acland and later the family of Evelyn Waugh and Auberon Waugh.

The other major river in the parish is the River Exe, which is on the parish boundary with Brompton Regis, which is crossed by the medieval Chilly Bridge and Hele Bridge, and the 18th century Weir Bridge.

In between the town centre and the river is a large recreation meadow which recently underwent renovation by locals (including the pupils of Dulverton Middle School) supported by a Barclays Bank New Futures Scheme.

South of the town is Briggins Moor a biological Site of Special Scientific Interest which provides an example of unimproved mire of a type which is restricted to south-west England and Wales and which has been significantly reduced in extent in the recent past. Purple moor-grass (Molinia caerulea) and meadow thistle (Cirsium dissectum) are abundant. There is a large colony of the marsh fritillary butterfly (Eurodryas aurinia).

=== Climate ===
Climate data for Liscombe (Note: Weather station is located 3.7 miles (6.0 km) from the Dulverton town centre.) (1991–2020 normals)
Month	Jan	Feb	Mar	Apr	May	Jun	Jul	Aug	Sep	Oct	Nov	Dec	Year
Record high °C (°F)	12.5 (54.5)	16.0 (60.8)	19.4 (66.9)	22.6 (72.7)	29.8 (85.6)	32.3 (90.1)	30.6 (87.1)	32.4 (90.3)	27.2 (81.0)	24.8 (76.6)	17.7 (63.9)	13.6 (56.5)	32.4 (90.3)
Mean daily maximum °C (°F)	6.4 (43.5)	6.8 (44.2)	8.8 (47.8)	11.6 (52.9)	14.6 (58.3)	17.3 (63.1)	19.0 (66.2)	18.8 (65.8)	16.7 (62.1)	12.9 (55.2)	9.4 (48.9)	7.0 (44.6)	12.5 (54.5)
Daily mean °C (°F)	4.1 (39.4)	4.1 (39.4)	5.7 (42.3)	7.8 (46.0)	10.6 (51.1)	13.3 (55.9)	15.1 (59.2)	15.1 (59.2)	13.1 (55.6)	10.1 (50.2)	6.9 (44.4)	4.6 (40.3)	9.2 (48.6)
Mean daily minimum °C (°F)	1.7 (35.1)	1.5 (34.7)	2.6 (36.7)	4.1 (39.4)	6.5 (43.7)	9.3 (48.7)	11.2 (52.2)	11.4 (52.5)	9.5 (49.1)	7.2 (45.0)	4.4 (39.9)	2.2 (36.0)	6.0 (42.8)
Record low °C (°F)	−7.5 (18.5)	−8.0 (17.6)	−7.9 (17.8)	−3.6 (25.5)	−0.8 (30.6)	3.2 (37.8)	5.3 (41.5)	5.6 (42.1)	2.3 (36.1)	−2.2 (28.0)	−6.4 (20.5)	−8.8 (16.2)	−8.8 (16.2)
Average precipitation mm (inches)	155.9 (6.14)	121.0 (4.76)	108.6 (4.28)	87.6 (3.45)	84.6 (3.33)	88.0 (3.46)	97.3 (3.83)	114.3 (4.50)	108.7 (4.28)	154.5 (6.08)	167.0 (6.57)	180.0 (7.09)	1,467.5 (57.78)
Average precipitation days (≥ 1.0 mm)	17.9	14.9	14.8	12.2	12.0	11.8	12.8	14.4	13.3	17.4	18.4	18.3	178.1
Mean monthly sunshine hours	49.4	68.4	100.4	162.8	178.5	187.0	182.9	165.4	136.5	95.4	60.3	54.4	1,441.4
Source 1: Met Office
Source 2: Starlings Roost Weather

== Transport ==
Dulverton station just after the rails were lifted in October 1969

Two miles from Dulverton is the village of Brushford, where the Dulverton railway station on the Taunton to Barnstaple line used to be. It opened in 1873 and closed to passengers, who transferred to Dulverton by bus, in October 1966. The station buildings are still visible and it is clear where the lines used to run as the railway embankment is still visible and worn in places although the rails have been lifted.

== Religious sites ==
The parish Church of All Saints in Bank Square has a tower from the 15th century, which was extensively restored between 1853 and 1855 when the rest of church was rebuilt by Edward Ashworth. It has been designated as Grade II* listed building.

The Congregational Church in Chapel Street was built in the 19th century with adjoining schoolrooms.

== Cultural references ==
Two ships of the Royal Navy have been named HMS Dulverton after the Dulverton Hunt. The first, HMS Dulverton (L63), launched in 1941, was a type II Hunt-class destroyer. She served in the Second World War and was scuttled in 1943 after being severely damaged by German air attack. The second and current HMS Dulverton (M35), launched in 1982, is a Hunt-class minesweeper.

== Notable Dulvertonians ==
- George Williams (1821–1905), philanthropist, businessman and founder of the YMCA
- Aubrey Herbert (1880–1923), diplomat, traveller and intelligence officer, was given Pixton Park by his mother
- Henry Charles Frank Morant (1885–1952), writer and photographer
- Phil Rookes (1919–2003), footballer who played 193 games, mainly for Portsmouth
- Auberon Herbert (1922–1974) opened up Pixton Park to Eastern Europeans after WW2
- John Nelder (1924–2010), statistician, came from nearby Brushford
- Auberon Waugh (1939–2001), writer and journalist, born at Pixton Park
- Lord Dulverton is a title held by the Wills family
