= Dulverton Town Hall =

Municipal building in Dulverton, Somerset, England

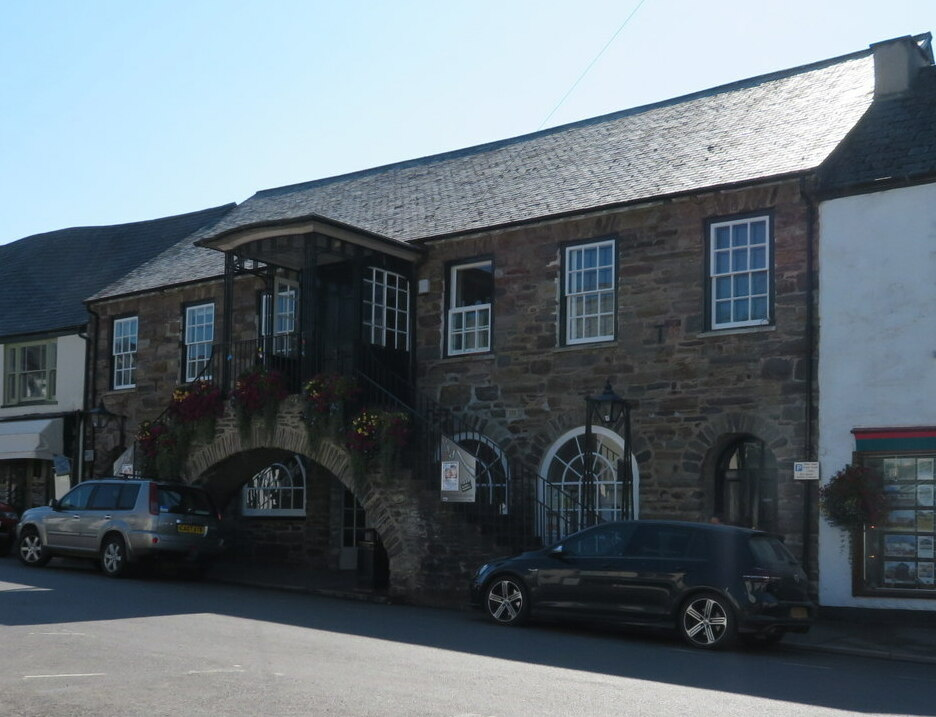
- Dulverton Town Hall

- Shown in Somerset
- 51.0401°N 3.5505°W
- Location: Fore Street, Dulverton

History
- Built: 1866

Site notes
- Architectural style: Neoclassical style

Listed Building – Grade II
- Official name: Market Hall
- Designated: 4 August 1986
- Reference no.: 1247925

Dulverton Town Hall is a municipal building in Fore Street in Dulverton, Somerset, England. The building, which is the meeting place of Dulverton Town Council, is a Grade II listed building.

== History ==
The first municipal building on the site was a market hall which was completed in 1760. It was replaced by the current structure, which was designed in the neoclassical style, built in rubble masonry and was completed in around 1866. The design involved a symmetrical main frontage with seven bays facing onto Fore Street: it was originally arcaded on the ground floor, so that markets could be held, with an assembly hall on the first floor. The first floor was fenestrated by sash windows. After market traders moved to other towns, use of the market hall on the ground floor declined, and it was converted for retail use in the 1870s. The openings in the outer and central bays were infilled with doorways, while the openings in the other bays were infilled with round headed windows with radiating glazing bars. In the late 19th century, petty session hearings took place in the building.

A porch and an external double staircase was added to a design by Sir Albert Richardson in 1927. The staircase was straight rather than curved, was decorated by wrought iron railings and was supported by a stone arch: it led to a first-floor porch with wrought iron bars supporting a wrought iron frieze with triglyphs and a flat canopy. The elaborate porch has been described by one architectural historian as "one of Richardson's best works". The upper hall was fitted out with a proscenium arch designed by Sir Edwin Lutyens at this time.

During the Second World War, the building was used a school to teach children evacuated from the major centres of population. The upper hall was also used as a cinema for United States Air Force personnel based at Knightshayes Court and other USAF bases in the local area. The lower ground floor was used as an antiques centre in the late 20th century, and then became a thrift shop, operated by the town hall management committee, with the proceeds being applied to the upkeep of the building. The lower ground floor also became the meeting place of Dulverton Town Council. Meanwhile, the upper hall reverted to use as a cinema, trading as Dulverton Films, in 2010.
