= Mounsey Castle =

Iron Age hillfort in Somerset, England

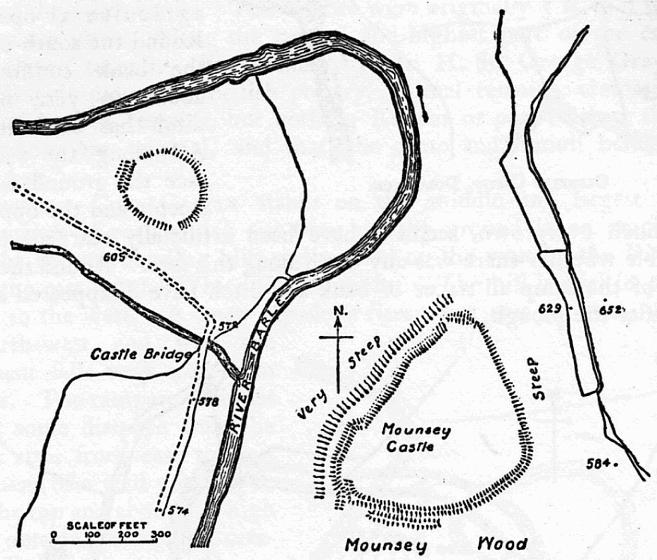
- Plan of Mounsey Castle

- Location within Somerset
- 51°03′16″N 3°35′36″W
- Location: Dulverton, Somerset, England

History
- Built: Iron Age

Site notes
- Area: 1.75 hectares (4.3 acres)

Scheduled monument
- Official name: Mounsey Castle and associated outwork 100m to the north
- Reference no.: 35638

Mounsey Castle is an Iron Age irregular triangular earthwork of 1.75 hectares (4.3 acres) north west of Dulverton, Somerset, England. It has been scheduled as an ancient monument. It has been added to the Heritage at Risk Register.

It is named after the Monceaux family, who were the local lords of the manor in the Middle Ages.

The earthwork is surrounded by the remains of coursed stone rampart which is between 1.5 metres (4 ft 11 in) and 2 metres (6 ft 7 in) high, with an entrance to the west. For most of its circumference it is univallate however where the slope is not so steep on the eastern and southern sides there is a second rampart. The remains of a stone building can be seen within the hillfort, which is likely to have been a charcoal burners hut.

It overlooks the River Barle.

== Background ==
Hill forts developed in the Late Bronze and Early Iron Age, roughly the start of the first millennium BC. The reason for their emergence in Britain, and their purpose, has been a subject of debate. It has been argued that they could have been military sites constructed in response to invasion from continental Europe, sites built by invaders, or a military reaction to social tensions caused by an increasing population and consequent pressure on agriculture. The dominant view since the 1960s has been that the increasing use of iron led to social changes in Britain. Deposits of iron ore were located in different places to the tin and copper ore necessary to make bronze, and as a result trading patterns shifted and the old elites lost their economic and social status. Power passed into the hands of a new group of people. Archaeologist Barry Cunliffe believes that population increase still played a role and has stated "[the forts] provided defensive possibilities for the community at those times when the stress [of an increasing population] burst out into open warfare. But I wouldn't see them as having been built because there was a state of war. They would be functional as defensive strongholds when there were tensions and undoubtedly some of them were attacked and destroyed, but this was not the only, or even the most significant, factor in their construction".

== See also ==
- List of hill forts and ancient settlements in Somerset
