= Clutton, Somerset =

Village in Somerset, England

Coordinates: 51.3305°N 2.5404°W

Clutton
- Location within Somerset
- Population: 1,602 (2011)
- OS grid reference: ST623592
- Unitary authority: Bath and North East Somerset
- Ceremonial county: Somerset
- Region: South West
- Country: England
- Sovereign state: United Kingdom
- Post town: BRISTOL
- Postcode district: BS39
- Dialling code: 01761
- Police: Avon and Somerset
- Fire: Avon
- Ambulance: South Western
- UK Parliament: North East Somerset and Hanham

Clutton is a village and civil parish on the eastern edge of the Chew Valley, close to the Cam Brook river, in the Bath and North East Somerset Council area, within the ceremonial county of Somerset, England. The village lies east of the A37 road between Bristol and Shepton Mallet, and west of the A39 between Bath and Wells. It is 9 miles (14 km) from Bristol and Bath, and 11 miles (18 km) from Wells. Close by are the villages of Temple Cloud and High Littleton. The town of Midsomer Norton is 5 miles (8 km) away. The parish, which includes the hamlets of Clutton Hill and Northend, had a population of 1,602 in 2011.

== History ==
Highbury Hill is the site of the earthwork remains of an Iron Age univallate hillfort. It occupies an area of woodland at the end of a narrow ridge. It is a Scheduled Ancient Monument. The 3 hectares (7.4 acres) site lies in an area of woodland at the south eastern end of a narrow ridge with steep slopes around it. There is a 0.5 metres (1.6 ft) outer bank which is 8 metres (26 ft) long with a shallow 8 metres (26 ft) wide ditch. Some Roman silver coins were found at the site in the late 18th century.

Clutton was called Clutone in the 1086 Domesday Book meaning 'A rocky hill enclosure' from the Old English cludig and tun, but there also is an obscure Celtic word cluttya meaning a 'hen's roost'.

The parish was part of the hundred of Chew.

There is a long history of coal mining in the village and the surrounding Somerset coalfield, but the mines are no longer working. The workings were described in a report of 1610, located near Widow Blacker's house. In the 19th century, the mines around Clutton were owned by the Earl of Warwick, who also owned sawmills, quarries, brickworks and agricultural interests. The Earl and his wife, Daisy Greville took a keen interest in the welfare of their miners and built Maynard Terrace a unique row of terrace houses at the edge of the village. The village formerly had a station on the Bristol and North Somerset Railway.

== Governance ==
The parish council has responsibility for local issues, including setting an annual precept (local rate) to cover the council's operating costs and producing annual accounts for public scrutiny. The parish council evaluates local planning applications and works with the local police, district council officers, and neighbourhood watch groups on matters of crime, security, and traffic. The parish council's role also includes initiating projects for the maintenance and repair of parish facilities, such as the village hall or community centre, playing fields and playgrounds, as well as consulting with the district council on the maintenance, repair, and improvement of highways, drainage, footpaths, public transport, and street cleaning. Conservation matters (including trees and listed buildings) and environmental issues are also of interest to the council.

Along with Stanton Drew and Chelwood, Clutton is part of the Clutton ward, which is represented by one councillor on the unitary authority of Bath and North East Somerset which was created in 1996, as established by the Local Government Act 1992. It provides a single tier of local government with responsibility for almost all local government functions within its area including local planning and building control, local roads, council housing, environmental health, markets and fairs, refuse collection, recycling, cemeteries, crematoria, leisure services, parks, and tourism. It is also responsible for education, social services, libraries, main roads, public transport, trading standards, waste disposal and strategic planning, although fire, police and ambulance services are provided jointly with other authorities through the Avon Fire and Rescue Service, Avon and Somerset Constabulary and the Great Western Ambulance Service.

Bath and North East Somerset's area covers part of the ceremonial county of Somerset but it is administered independently of the non-metropolitan county. Its administrative headquarters is in Bath. Between 1 April 1974 and 1 April 1996, it was the Wansdyke District and the City of Bath of the county of Avon. Before 1974 that the parish was part of the Clutton Rural District.

An electoral ward of the same name exists. Although Clutton is the most populous area of the ward it stretches north westerly to Stanton Drew. The total population of this ward taken at the 2011 census was 2,537.

The parish is represented in the House of Commons of the Parliament of the United Kingdom as part of North East Somerset and Hanham. It elects one Member of Parliament (MP) by the first past the post system of election. It was also part of the South West England constituency of the European Parliament, prior to Britain leaving the European Union in January 2020, which elected seven MEPs using the d'Hondt method of party-list proportional representation.

== Demographics ==
According to the 2001 Census the Clutton ward (which includes Stanton Drew and Chelwood) had 1,290 residents, living in 483 households, with an average age of 40.3 years. Of these 72% of residents describing their health as 'good', 22% of 16- to 74-year-olds had no qualifications; and the area had an unemployment rate of 2.2% of all economically active people aged 16–74. In the Index of Multiple Deprivation 2004, it was ranked at 24,527 out of 32,482 wards in England, where 1 was the most deprived LSOA and 32,482 the least deprived.

== Church ==
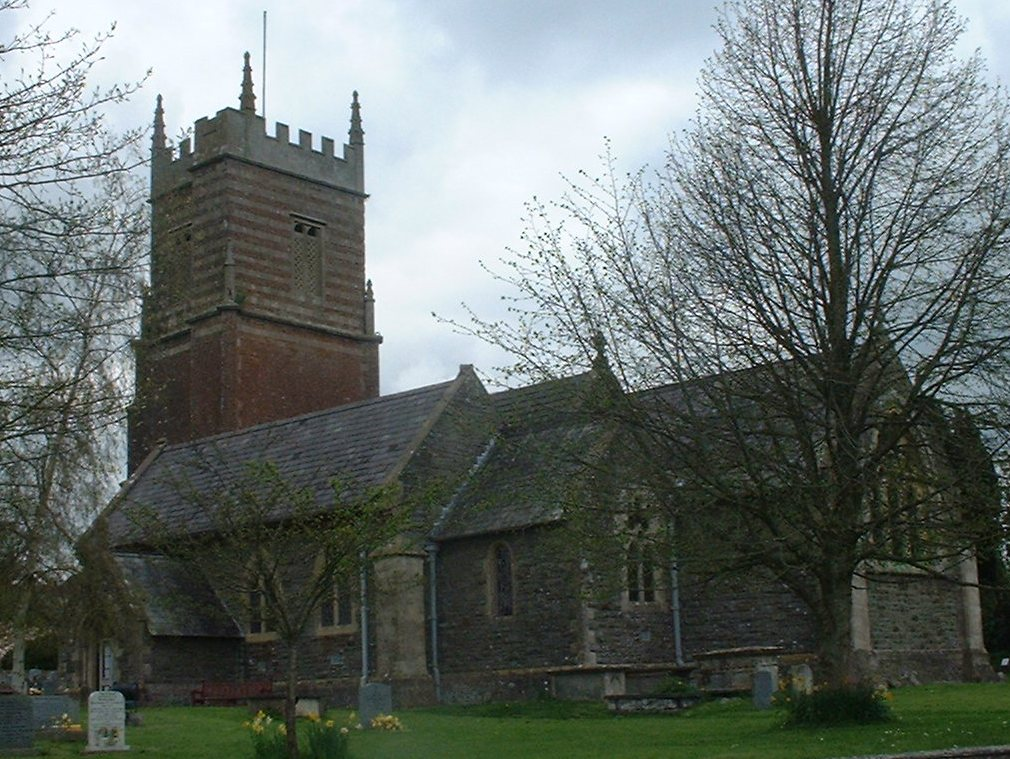
Church of St Augustine of Hippo

The parish church is dedicated to St Augustine of Hippo. It dates from around 1190, but has had several major restorations. The tower is made of red sandstone with diagonal buttresses ending in pinnacles and probably dates from 1726. The tower contains two bells dating from 1734, made by Thomas Bilbie of the Bilbie family. The church is a Grade II* listed building (Historic England. "Church of St. Augustine at Images of England (1320766)". National Heritage List for England.) Two railed tomb enclosures within the Broadribb family plot are also listed as Grade II, (Historic England. "tomb enclosures at Images of England (1320788)". National Heritage List for England.) as are a group of three Broadribb and Purnell monuments. (Historic England. "Group of 3 Broadribb and Purnell monuments at Images of England (1129586)". National Heritage List for England.) The church is currently under a small amount of renovation.

== Other Grade II listed buildings ==
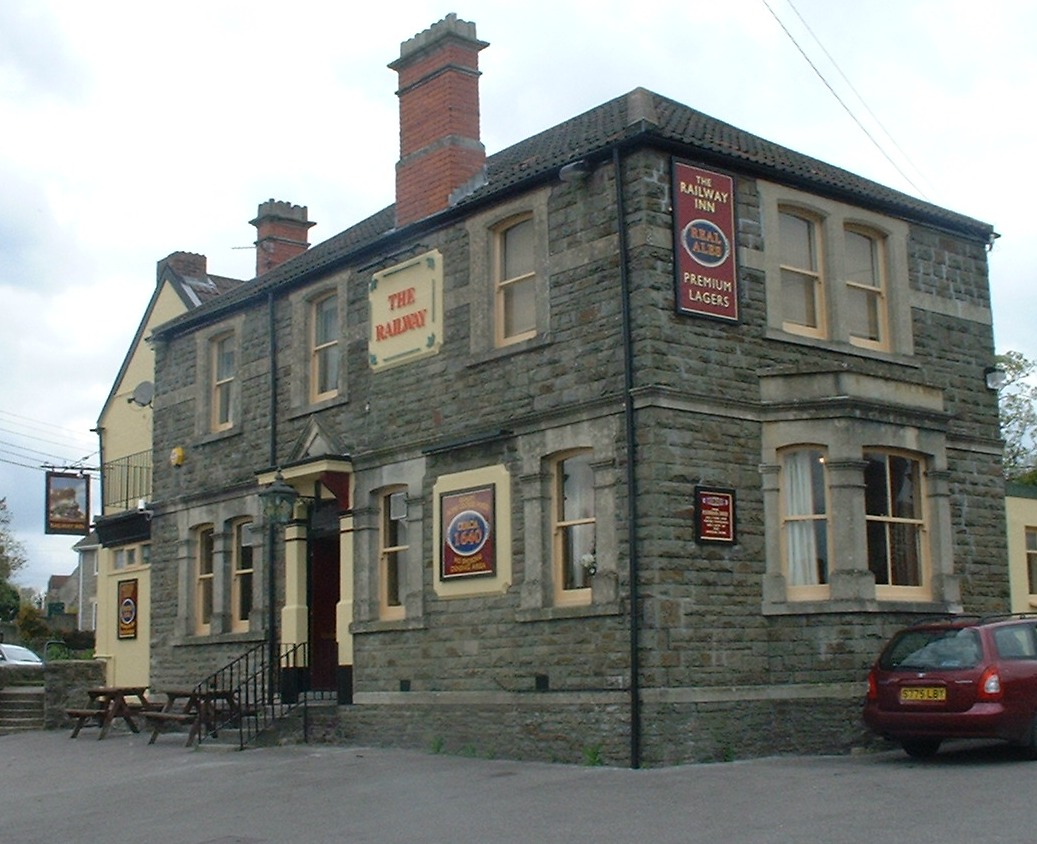
Railway Inn

- Historic England. "Church Farmhouse at Images of England (1129545)". National Heritage List for England.
- Historic England. "Cambrook House at Images of England (1320789)". National Heritage List for England.
- Historic England. "Cloud Hill Farmhouse at Images of England (1129546)". National Heritage List for England.
- Historic England. "Railway Inn at Images of England (1129547)". National Heritage List for England.
- Historic England. "Springwells at Images of England (1320790)". National Heritage List for England.
- Historic England. "Methodist Church at Images of England (1129548)". National Heritage List for England.

== In popular culture ==
The television series Robin of Sherwood was partly filmed nearby in the Greyfield Woods during 1984.

In 2021, Clutton Hill was used as a location in the crime drama series McDonald & Dodds in the episode "The Man Who Wasn't There".

== Notable people ==
- Amy Woodman (born 1 November 1984), English National Long-jump champion in 2011 and 2012; English indoor long jump champion 2011; USA National Collegiate Champion (NCCA) – Long jump 2011. Woodman lived in Clutton from the age of two years.
- Maisie Williams (born 15 April 1997), English actress known for Game of Thrones. Williams attended Clutton Primary School.
