= Olchard =

Village in Devon, England

Coordinates: 50.58°N 03.59°W

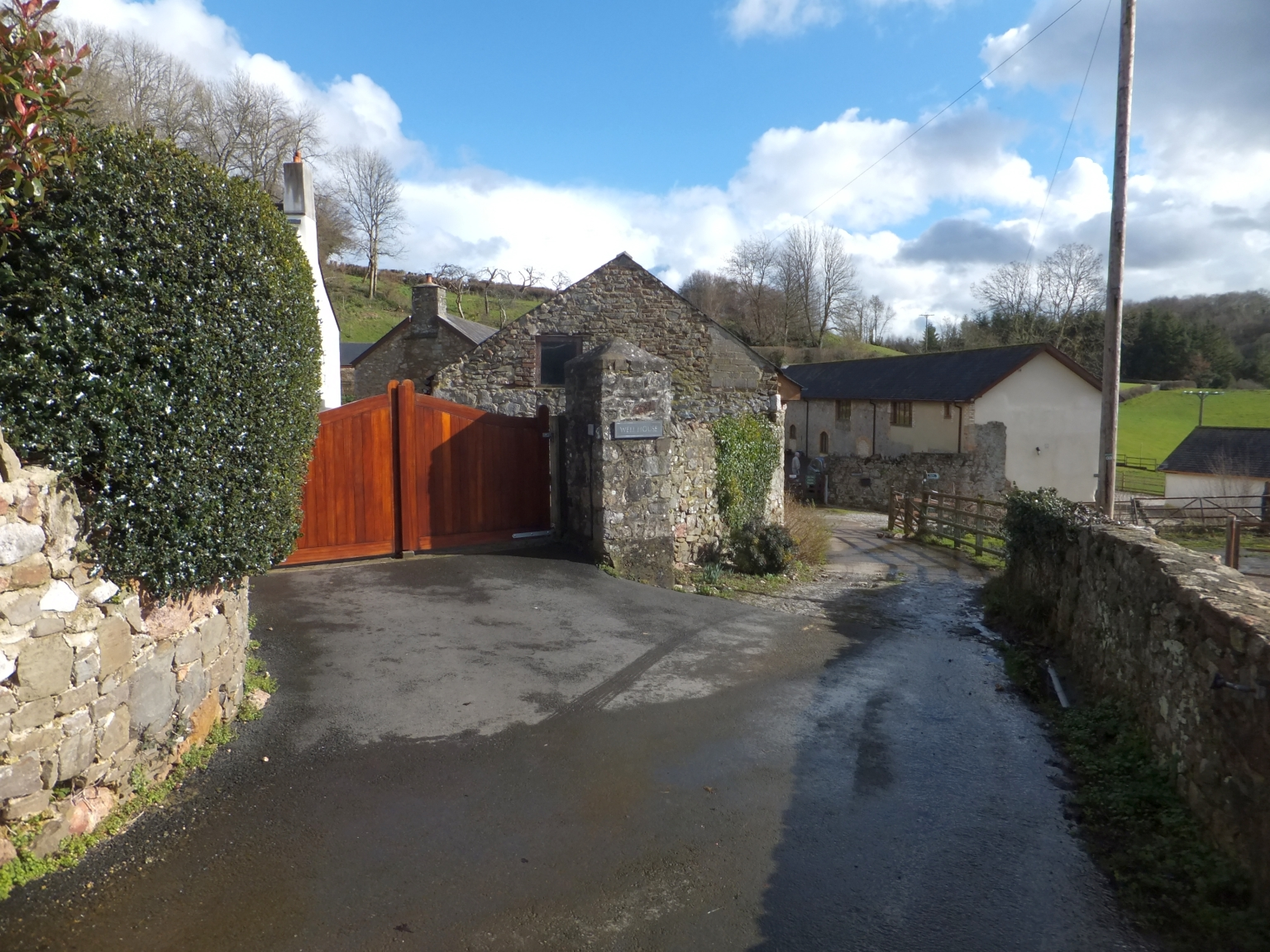
- Stone walls and stone buildings at Olchard

- Location within Devon
- OS grid reference: SX8777
- Shire county: Devon
- Region: South West
- Country: England
- Sovereign state: United Kingdom
- Police: Devon and Cornwall
- Fire: Devon and Somerset
- Ambulance: South Western

Olchard is a village in Devon, England.

== Etymology ==
The name of Olchard is first clearly attested in 1765. However, Oliver Padel has argued that surnames of local people attested as early as 1332 as Tolchet evidence an earlier form of this name (with the t- later being lost due to misanalysis of the phrase "at Tolchet" as "at Olchet"). He analyses this as deriving from Common Brittonic. It seems to comprise the words found in modern Welsh as twll ("hole, cave") and coed ("woodland"), the name being paralleled by several Welsh places called Tyllgoed, the Cornish place-name Tolgus, and the now-lost Breton place-name Toulgoat.
