= Glastonbury type pottery =

Iron Age pottery

Glastonbury type pottery is a form of Iron Age pottery derived from earlier Gaulish art of the middle La Tène period. It was made in southwestern England and takes its name from the town of Glastonbury in Somerset.
