= Ruishton =

Village and civil parish in Somerset, England

Coordinates: 51.0151°N 3.0491°W

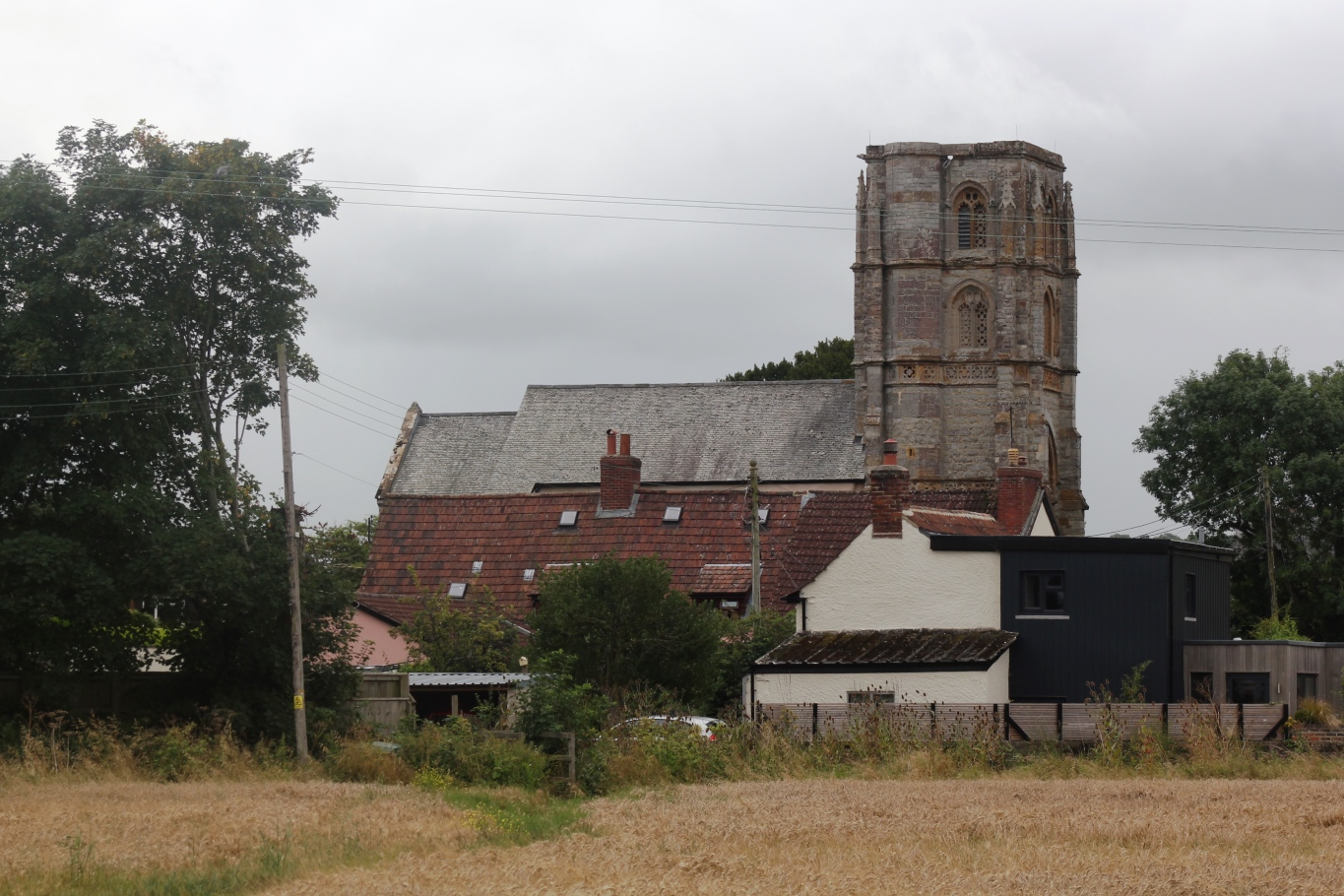
- Church of St George, Ruishton

- Location within Somerset
- Population: 1,473 (2011)
- OS grid reference: ST265245
- Unitary authority: Somerset Council
- Ceremonial county: Somerset
- Region: South West
- Country: England
- Sovereign state: United Kingdom
- Post town: TAUNTON
- Postcode district: TA3
- Dialling code: 01823
- Police: Avon and Somerset
- Fire: Devon and Somerset
- Ambulance: South Western
- UK Parliament: Taunton and Wellington

Ruishton is a village and civil parish in Somerset, England, situated on the River Tone and A358 road 2 miles (3.2 km) east of Taunton. The village has a population of 1,473. The parish includes the hamlet of Henlade.

== History ==
The name Ruishton means settlement where rushes grow.

Cambria Farm which is now the site of a Park and ride close to Junction 25 of the M5 motorway was the site of a Bronze and Iron Age settlement and Roman farm.

The tithings of Ruishton and Henlade formed part of the manor of Taunton Deane from the 9th century. The parish of Ruishton was part of the Taunton Deane Hundred.

Henlade House was built between 1805 and 1815, by an unidentified Italian architect for John Proctor Anderdon. It has been designated as a Grade II* listed building. During World War II, it was host to a private school from Folkestone who were evacuated here. It is now a hotel.

Ruishton House dates from 1893. It was built by a Mr Spiller for Stuart Somerville. The Somerville family owned the paperworks at Creech St Michael, and there is a memorial to them in the Church of St George.

== Governance ==
The parish council has responsibility for local issues, including setting an annual precept (local rate) to cover the council's operating costs and producing annual accounts for public scrutiny. The parish council evaluates local planning applications and works with the local police, district council officers, and neighbourhood watch groups on matters of crime, security, and traffic. The parish council's role also includes initiating projects for the maintenance and repair of parish facilities, as well as consulting with the district council on the maintenance, repair, and improvement of highways, drainage, footpaths, public transport, and street cleaning. Conservation matters (including trees and listed buildings) and environmental issues are also the responsibility of the council.

For local government purposes, since 1 April 2023, the village comes under the unitary authority of Somerset Council. Prior to this, it was part of the non-metropolitan district of Somerset West and Taunton (formed on 1 April 2019) and, before this, the district of Taunton Deane (established under the Local Government Act 1972). From 1894 to 1974, for local government purposes, Ruishton was part of Taunton Rural District.

The appropriate electoral ward is called 'Ruishton and Creech'. The ward stretches from Thornfalcon in the south, through Creech St. Michael to Adsborough. The total population of this ward is 4,008.

It is also part of the Taunton and Wellington county constituency represented in the House of Commons of the Parliament of the United Kingdom. It elects one Member of Parliament (MP) by the first past the post system of election.

== Religious sites ==
The Norman parish Church of St George was built in the 14th and 15th centuries and has been designated as a grade I listed building. In the churchyard is the remains of a 15th-century cross.
