= Dinghurst fort =

Iron Age hillfort in Somerset, England

- Dinghurst fort shown within Somerset
- 51.32872°N 2.798669°W
- Location: Somerset, England

History
- Built: During the Iron Age

Site notes
- Architectural style: British pre-Roman Architecture

Scheduled monument
- Reference no.: 194536

Dinghurst fort is an Iron Age univallate hillfort south of Churchill in Somerset, England. A scarp encircles the camp, 2.0 metres (6.5 ft) high in the east and 3.0 metres (9.8 ft) high in the west. The fort is also surrounded by a fosse. Bones, rings, and weapons have been found inside the fort.
