= Tedbury Camp =

Iron Age hillfort in Somerset, England

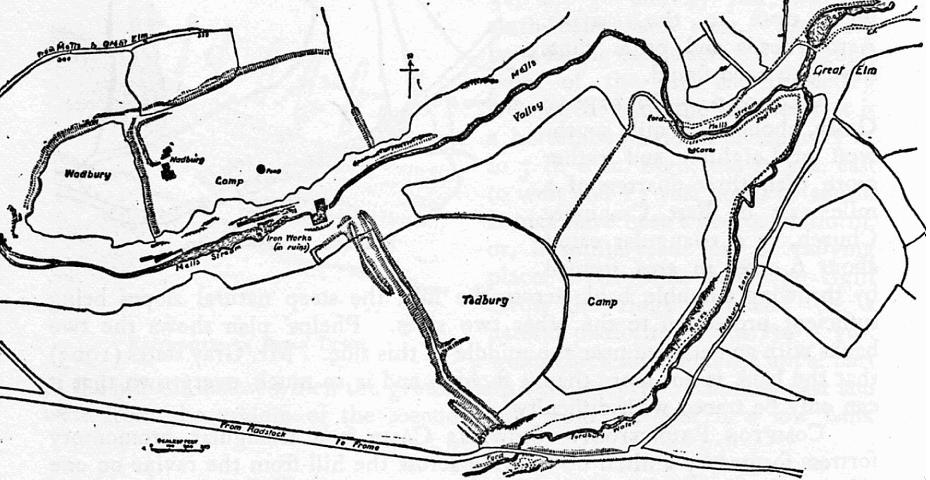
- Plan of the site

- Location within Somerset
- 51°14′18″N 2°22′10″W
- Location: Great Elm, Somerset, England

History
- Built: Iron Age

Site notes
- Area: c. 60 acres (24 ha)

Scheduled monument
- Reference no.: 202769

Tedbury Camp is a multivallate Iron Age promontory hill fort defended by two parallel banks near Great Elm, Somerset, England.

== Background ==
Hill forts developed in the Late Bronze and Early Iron Age, roughly the start of the first millennium BC. The reason for their emergence in Britain, and their purpose, has been a subject of debate. It has been argued that they could have been military sites constructed in response to invasion from continental Europe, sites built by invaders, or a military reaction to social tensions caused by an increasing population and consequent pressure on agriculture. The dominant view since the 1960s has been that the increasing use of iron led to social changes in Britain. Deposits of iron ore were located in different places to the tin and copper ore necessary to make bronze, and as a result trading patterns shifted and the old elites lost their economic and social status. Power passed into the hands of a new group of people. Archaeologist Barry Cunliffe believes that population increase still played a role and has stated "[the forts] provided defensive possibilities for the community at those times when the stress [of an increasing population] burst out into open warfare. But I wouldn't see them as having been built because there was a state of war. They would be functional as defensive strongholds when there were tensions and undoubtedly some of them were attacked and destroyed, but this was not the only, or even the most significant, factor in their construction".

== Description ==
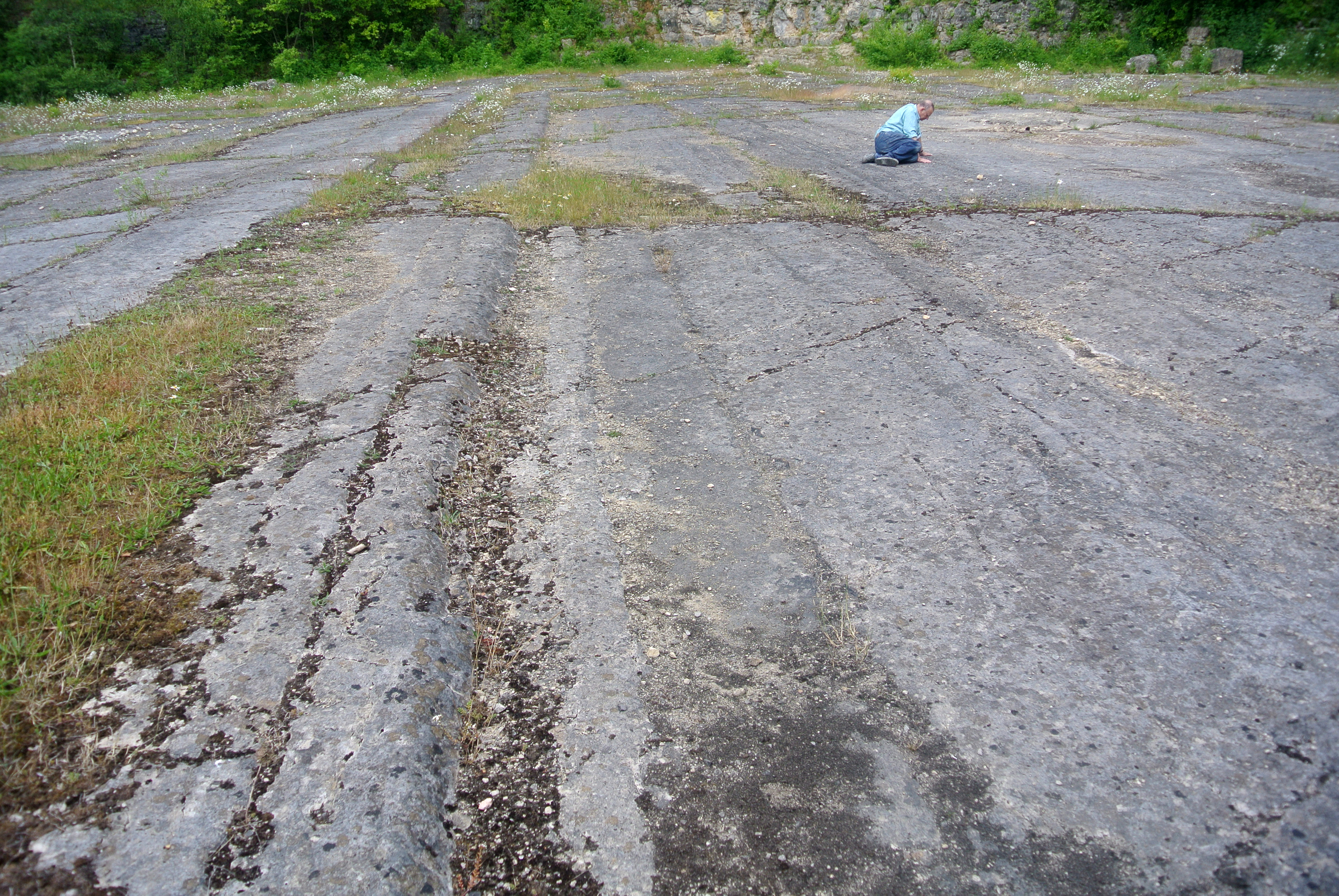
Carboniferous/Jurassic unconformity surface at Tedbury Camp.

The inner bank is 4 feet (1.2 m) to 6 feet (1.8 m) wide and stand 10 feet (3.0 m) to 15 feet (4.6 m) high in places. There may have been a third bank. It covers an area of approximately 60 acres (24 ha) between the Mells River and Fordbury Water.

It is also a site of Roman occupation between 337 and 366 which left behind a hoard of Constantine Junior coins which were found in 1691.

Further excavations and explorations of the site were carried out in the 19th and 20th centuries, with a Quern-stone being discovered between 1939 and 1945.

A quarry 500 metres (1,600 ft) north east of the camp actively extracted Carboniferous limestone in the 20th century and shows a geological angular unconformity.

== See also ==
- List of hill forts and ancient settlements in Somerset
