= Brompton Ralph =

Village in Somerset, England

Coordinates: 51.0845°N 3.3078°W

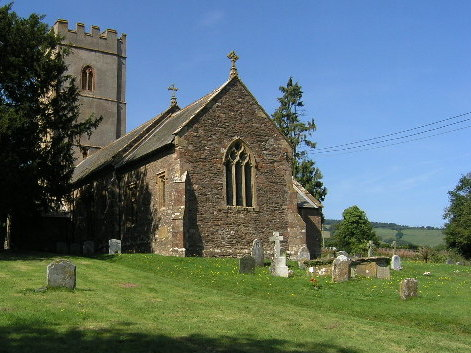
- St Mary's Church, Brompton Ralph

- Location within Somerset
- Population: 287 (2011)
- OS grid reference: ST085325
- Unitary authority: Somerset Council
- Ceremonial county: Somerset
- Region: South West
- Country: England
- Sovereign state: United Kingdom
- Post town: TAUNTON
- Postcode district: TA4
- Dialling code: 01984
- Police: Avon and Somerset
- Fire: Devon and Somerset
- Ambulance: South Western
- UK Parliament: Tiverton and Minehead

Brompton Ralph is a village and civil parish in Somerset, England, about 11 miles (18 km) west of Taunton, and 3 miles (5 km) north of Wiveliscombe. It is in a wooded district at the eastern extremity of the Brendon Hills. According to the 2002 population estimates it had a population of 287.

== History ==
The name Brompton, or Brunanton as it was called in the 8th century, is probably a corruption of Brendon, meaning the farmhouse by the Brendons.

Within the parish are vestiges of an encampment believed to have been constructed by the Romans.

The parish of Brompton Ralph was part of the Williton and Freemanners Hundred.

The manor farmhouse, which is Grade II* listed, dates from the mid 17th century.

== Governance ==
The parish council has responsibility for local issues, including setting an annual precept (local rate) to cover the council's operating costs and producing annual accounts for public scrutiny. The parish council evaluates local planning applications and works with the local police, district council officers, and neighbourhood watch groups on matters of crime, security, and traffic. The parish council's role also includes initiating projects for the maintenance and repair of parish facilities, as well as consulting with the district council on the maintenance, repair, and improvement of highways, drainage, footpaths, public transport, and street cleaning. Conservation matters (including trees and listed buildings) and environmental issues are also the responsibility of the council.

For local government purposes, since 1 April 2023, the parish comes under the unitary authority of Somerset Council. Prior to this, it was part of the non-metropolitan district of Somerset West and Taunton (formed on 1 April 2019) and, before this, the district of West Somerset (established under the Local Government Act 1972). It was part of Williton Rural District before 1974.

It is also part of the Tiverton and Minehead county constituency represented in the House of Commons of the Parliament of the United Kingdom. It elects one Member of Parliament (MP) by the first past the post system of election.

== Religious sites ==
St Mary's Church has a 15th-century tower and south door. The nave was refenestrated and the vestry added in the 16th century, and the church was partly rebuilt about 1740. It has been designated by English Heritage as a Grade II* listed building. Due to damage caused by leaking roofs it has been added to the Heritage at Risk Register.
