= List of scheduled monuments in North Somerset =

North Somerset shown within Somerset and England

North Somerset is a unitary authority area in England. Its area covers part of the ceremonial county of Somerset but it is administered independently of the non-metropolitan county. Its administrative headquarters is in the town hall in Weston-super-Mare. North Somerset borders the local government areas of Bristol, Bath and North East Somerset, Mendip and Sedgemoor. North Somerset contains the parliamentary constituencies of Weston-super-Mare and North Somerset.

A scheduled monument is a nationally important archaeological site or monument which is given legal protection by being placed on a list (or "schedule") by the Secretary of State for Culture, Media and Sport; English Heritage takes the leading role in identifying such sites. The legislation governing this is the Ancient Monuments and Archaeological Areas Act 1979. The term "monument" can apply to the whole range of archaeological sites, and they are not always visible above ground. Such sites have to have been deliberately constructed by human activity. They range from prehistoric standing stones and burial sites, through Roman remains and medieval structures such as castles and monasteries, to later structures such as industrial sites and buildings constructed for the World Wars or the Cold War.

There are 68 scheduled monuments in North Somerset. The oldest site Aveline's Hole, a cave in which bones from the Mesolithic have been identified making it the earliest scientifically dated cemetery in Britain. There are also multiple Neolithic tumuli. There are also several Iron Age hillforts, such as the one at Worlebury Camp. Dolebury Warren, another Iron Age hillfort, was reused as a medieval rabbit warren. The Romano-British period is represented with sites including villas. Sites from the Middle Ages include motte-and-bailey castles, such as Locking Castle, and church crosses. There are also several deserted medieval settlements. Woodspring Priory is a former Augustinian priory founded in the early 13th century. More recent sites date from the Industrial Revolution and include the Elms colliery and glassworks in Nailsea. The most recent monuments are two Palmerstonian gun batteries, built in the 1860s, on the island of Steep Holm. The monuments are listed below using the titles given in the English Heritage data sheets.

== Monuments ==
Scheduled monuments in North Somerset
Name	Location	Type	Completed (Note: The date given is the date used by Historic England as significant for the initial building or that of an important part in the structure's description.)	Grid ref. (Note: The grid reference is based on the British national grid reference system, sometimes known as OSGB36, used by the Ordnance Survey.) Geo-coordinates	Notes	Entry number (Note: The "List Entry Number" is a unique number assigned to each listed building and scheduled monument by Historic England.)	Image	Ref.
Aveline's Hole, Burrington Combe	Burrington Combe	Cave	Mesolithic	ST 47626 58676; 51°19′29″N 2°45′12″W	Aveline's Hole is a limestone cave in Burrington Combe. The earliest scientifically dated cemetery in Britain was found at Aveline's Hole. The human bone fragments it contained, from over 50 different individuals, are thought to be between roughly 10,200 and 10,400 years old.	1010297	Aveline's Hole, Burrington Combe	
Banwell Camp: a large multivallate Hillfort on Banwell Plain	Banwell	Hillfort	Iron Age	ST 40939 59002; 51°19′37″N 2°50′56″W	Banwell Camp is a multivallate Iron Age hillfort. The hillfort is situated approximately 1.6 miles (2.6 km) east from the town of Banwell. Some artefacts found on the site dates back to the Bronze Age and the Stone Age.	1008031	Upload Photo	
Bell barrow 650 m south-west of Uphill Farm	Weston-super-Mare	Bell barrow	Bronze Age	ST 31612 57914; 51°18′58″N 2°58′58″W	A Bell barrow with a diameter of 13 metres (43 ft).	1011130	Upload Photo	
Bowl barrow 90 m south-west of Bicknell Farm	Nempnett Thrubwell	Bowl barrow	Neolithic to Bronze Age	ST 51641 62732; 51°21′41″N 2°41′46″W	A Bell barrow with a diameter of approximately 26 metres (85 ft).	1008294	Upload Photo	
Bowl barrow 170 m east of Poplar Farm	Winford	Bowl barrow	Neolithic to Bronze Age	ST 52388 65492; 51°23′11″N 2°41′08″W	A Bell barrow with a diameter of 30 metres (98 ft).	1008297	Bowl barrow 170 m east of Poplar Farm	
Bowl barrow 230 m NNE of Quarry Farm: part of the Redhill round barrow cemetery	Wrington	Bowl barrow	Bronze Age	ST 50568 63860; 51°22′18″N 2°42′41″W	A bowl barrow with a diameter of approximately 15 metres (49 ft). It is part of the Redhill round barrow cemetery.	1011129	Upload Photo	
Bowl barrow 300 m NNE of Quarry Farm: part of the Redhill round barrow cemetery	Wrington	Bowl barrow	Bronze Age	ST 50613 63916; 51°22′20″N 2°42′39″W	A Bowl barrow with a diameter of 12 metres (39 ft). It is part of the Redhill round barrow cemetery.	1011128	Upload Photo	
Bowl barrow 420 m ENE of Quarry Farm: part of the Redhill round barrow cemetery	Wrington	Bowl barrow	Bronze Age	ST 50831 63833; 51°22′17″N 2°42′28″W	A Bowl barrow with a diameter of 24 metres (79 ft). It is part of the Redhill round barrow cemetery.	1011126	Upload Photo	
Bowl barrow on Shiplate Slait	Loxton	Bowl barrow	Neolithic to Bronze Age	ST 36558 57052; 51°18′32″N 2°54′41″W	A Bowl barrow with a diameter of 24 metres (79 ft) and around 1.2 metres (3 ft 11 in) high.	1009883	Upload Photo	
Cadbury Camp, a small multivalate hillfort on Cadbury Hill	Tickenham	Hillfort	Iron Age	ST 45406 72467; 51°26′45″N 2°47′12″W	Cadbury Camp is a well-preserved Iron Age hillfort. It is managed by the National Trust through a Higher Level Stewardship agreement with Natural England which involves tree clearing and management of the scrub. Although primarily known as a fort during the Iron Age it is likely, from artefacts discovered at the site, that it was first used in the Bronze Age and still occupied through the Roman era into the Anglo-Saxon period.	1008295	Cadbury Camp, a small multivalate hillfort on Cadbury Hill More images	
Chapel at Lower Court	Long Ashton	Chantry chapel	13th century	ST 54891 70241; 51°25′46″N 2°39′01″W	A disused stone chantry chapel with a tiled roof.	1007015	Upload Photo	
Churchyard cross in St Andrew's churchyard	Backwell	Cross	15th century	ST 49312 68323; 51°24′41″N 2°43′50″W	A 3-metre (9.8 ft) high stone cross on a stepped base which dates from the 15th century. The lantern head of the cross was added in the 19th century replacing the original stone dial and ball.	1016202	Churchyard cross in St Andrew's churchyard	
Churchyard cross in St Bridget's churchyard, Chelvey	Chelvey, Brockley, Somerset	Cross	14th century	ST 46619 68355; 51°24′43″N 2°46′04″W	A 1.5-metre (4 ft 11 in) high stone cross on an octagonal stepped base which dates from the 14th century. The box and ball at the top of the shaft was added in 1877.	1015507	Churchyard cross in St Bridget's churchyard, Chelvey More images	
Churchyard cross in St Andrew's churchyard	Congresbury	Cross	14th century	ST 43598 63744; 51°22′12″N 2°48′42″W	A 14th century stone cross on an octagonal stepped base.	1015506	Churchyard cross in St Andrew's churchyard More images	
Churchyard cross in All Saints churchyard	Kingston Seymour	Cross	13th century	ST 40098 66846; 51°23′51″N 2°51′45″W	The shaft of the churchyard cross is 1.5 metres (4 ft 11 in) high and stands on an octagonal base. The shaft was added in 1863.	1015509	Churchyard cross in All Saints churchyard	
Churchyard cross at St John's Church, Weston-super-Mare	Weston-super-Mare	Cross	13th century	ST 31792 61933; 51°21′09″N 2°58′51″W	A late 13th century stone cross. The upper part of the shaft is missing.	1005420	Churchyard cross at St John's Church, Weston-super-Mare	
Churchyard cross in St John The Evangelist's churchyard	Kenn	Cross	14th century	ST 41606 68969; 51°25′00″N 2°50′28″W	The shaft of the churchyard cross is approximately 2.2 metres (7 ft 3 in) high and stands on a four-step octagonal base. The present cross head was added in 1920.	1015515	Churchyard cross in St John The Evangelist's churchyard	
Churchyard cross in St Mary and St Peter's churchyard	Winford	Cross	15th century	ST 54293 65005; 51°22′57″N 2°39′29″W	The base of a churchyard cross on a stepped octagonal base.	1015875	Churchyard cross in St Mary and St Peter's churchyard	
Churchyard cross in St Michael's churchyard	Dundry	Cross	15th century	ST 55736 66869; 51°23′56″N 2°38′14″W	The shaft of the churchyard cross is approximately 3 metres (9.8 ft) high and stands on a four-step octagonal base. The cross head was added in the 19th century replacing the original canopied head.	1015512	Churchyard cross in St Michael's churchyard More images	
Cross in St Lawrence's churchyard	Wick St. Lawrence	Cross	1480	ST 36650 65433; 51°23′04″N 2°54′42″W	The octagonal base of a churchyard cross which was erected around 1480.	1016198	Upload Photo	
Congresbury village cross	Congresbury	Cross	Middle Ages	ST 43733 63816; 51°22′14″N 2°48′35″W	A 2.5-metre (8 ft 2 in) high 15th century cross on an octagonal plinth. The head of the cross was replaced in the early 19th century.	1015505	Congresbury village cross	
Deserted medieval farmstead 420 m south of Gout House Farm	Banwell	Earthworks	Middle Ages	ST 40215 61071; 51°20′44″N 2°51′35″W	Earthworks from farm buildings occupied from the 11th to 14th centuries; however archaeological remains suggest the site was first occupied in the Romano-British period. The raised area which was occupied by the Bower House was surrounded by a water filled ditch, part of which has since been incorporated into a rhyne.	1011133	Upload Photo	
Deserted medieval farmstead and part of a Romano-British field system 400 m north of Fenswood Farm	Long Ashton	Earthworks	Middle Ages	ST 53285 70470; 51°25′53″N 2°40′24″W	Three enclosures which are thought to be the foundations of buildings, each surrounded by a rubble banks.	1011979	Upload Photo	
Deserted medieval settlement 300 m ESE of Wraxall House	Wraxall	Earthworks	Middle Ages	ST 48755 71368; 51°26′20″N 2°44′19″W	Earthworks from houses, enclosures and possibly a watermill which were occupied in the Middle Ages.	1011259	Upload Photo	
Dolebury Camp: a large univallate hillfort and associated and later earthworks on Dolebury Warren	Churchill	Hillfort	Iron Age and post Medieval	ST 45120 58958; 51°19′39″N 2°47′01″W	Dolebury Warren is a 90.6 hectares (224 acres) biological Site of Special Scientific Interest (SSSI) and ancient monument. It is owned by the National Trust, who acquired the freehold in 1983, and managed by the Avon Wildlife Trust. Standing on a limestone ridge on the northern edge of the Mendip Hills, it was made into a hillfort during the Iron Age and was occupied into the Roman period. The extensive fort covers 9.1 hectares (22 acres) with single or double defensive ramparts around it. The name Dolebury Warren comes from its use during the medieval or post medieval periods as a rabbit warren. The topography and differing soil types provide a habitat for an unusually wide range of plants, attracting a variety of insects including butterflies.	1008184	Dolebury Camp: a large univallate hillfort and associated and later earthworks on Dolebury Warren More images	
Duck decoy, 250 m south of Black Rock Villas	Weston-in-Gordano	Duck decoy	18th century	ST 45672 74247; 51°27′53″N 2°47′00″W	Earthworks of an 18th century six pipe duck decoy.	1015949	Upload Photo	
Elms Colliery	Nailsea	Coal mine	18th century	ST 48218 70558; 51°25′54″N 2°44′47″W	Three buildings survive from the Elms Colliery, also known as Middle Engine Pit, which operated from the late 18th century until closure in the 1850s. The site has been placed on the Heritage at Risk Register.	1004533	Elms Colliery	
Iron Age defended settlement 400 m south of Manor Farm	Wraxall	Earthworks	Iron Age	ST 52051 71927; 51°26′39″N 2°41′29″W	Earthworks of an oval defended settlement surrounded by a bank and ditch.	1018267	Upload Photo	
Large univallate hillfort on Cadbury Hill	Congresbury	Hillfort	Iron Age	ST 44153 64950; 51°22′49″N 2°48′12″W	Cadbury Hill hillfort is known, in archaeological circles, as Cadbury-Congresbury in order to differentiate it from the Cadbury Castle hillfort in South Cadbury. It appears to have been constructed in the Iron Age when one or more ramparts, with walls and ditches, were built on the steep slopes of the hill to defend an area covering some 8.5 acres (3.4 ha). The remains of Iron Age round houses may still be seen inside. The hillfort was refortified between 430 and 480 AD and occupation extended into the sub-Roman period, from which much imported pottery has been recovered.	1011258	Large univallate hillfort on Cadbury Hill More images	
Littleton gunpowder works at Powdermill Farm	Winford	Powder mill	c. 1650	ST 54981 64406; 51°22′37″N 2°38′54″W	Littleton gunpowder works opened around 1650 and expanded to become the largest powder producing works in South West England by the middle of the 18th century. It closed in the 1820s after the end of the Napoleonic Wars. Some of the buildings remain intact, while others are ruined.	1019452	Littleton gunpowder works at Powdermill Farm More images	
Long barrow on Redhill	Wrington	Long barrow	Neolithic	ST 49956 63603; 51°22′09″N 2°43′13″W	A long barrow which is approximately 53 metres (174 ft) long, 11 metres (36 ft) wide and 0.6 metres (2 ft 0 in) high.	1008289	Upload Photo	
Long barrow 350 m south-west of Cornerpool Farm	Wrington	Long barrow	Neolithic	ST 50057 64386; 51°22′35″N 2°43′08″W	A collapsed chambered long barrow. The fallen portal stone and three supporting stones are still visible.	1008291	Long barrow 350 m south-west of Cornerpool Farm	
Moated site at Nye Farm	Winscombe	Earthworks	Middle Ages	ST 41376 61536; 51°21′00″N 2°50′36″W	An area of raised ground surrounded by a 10-metre (33 ft) wide moat. It is known to have been occupied of the site is recorded in 1290 and 1332.	1011132	Moated site at Nye Farm	
Manorial settlement at Weston Manor	Weston-in-Gordano	Earthworks	Middle Ages	ST 44461 74019; 51°27′45″N 2°48′03″W	The remains of a manor house constructed around 1430, damaged in the English Civil War and occupied until 1692. Some of the masonry from the house has been used as part of a boundary wall.	1007913	Upload Photo	
Minor Romano-British villa 650 m north-east of Hewish Farm	Yatton	Roman villa	Romano-British	ST 40509 65243; 51°22′59″N 2°51′22″W	The site of a Romano-British villa with mosaic floors and hypocausts. Coins and pottery from 250 to 360 AD have been discovered at the site. Some of the walls can still be identified as low grass covered banks.	1011262	Upload Photo	
Motte-and-bailey castle and associated earthworks south of Locking Head Farm	Locking	Motte-and-bailey castle	12th century	ST 36373 60881; 51°20′36″N 2°54′54″W	Locking Castle was a motte-and-bailey on Carberry Hill. Excavations in 1902 identified the remains of a small stone chamber surrounded by a ditch. Fragments of pottery and the remains of a sword were also found. The origin of the castle is unclear. It may have been part of the manor of Kewstoke or alternatively Hutton. The two manors were combined and given by Henry I to Geoffrey de Dun. In 1214 Locking was given to Woodspring Priory and would have ceased to have military significance.	1008301	Motte-and-bailey castle and associated earthworks south of Locking Head Farm	
Motte-and-bailey castle 650 m NNW of Sandpoint Farm	Kewstoke	Motte-and-bailey castle	Middle Ages	ST 32641 66044; 51°23′22″N 2°58′10″W	A motte-and-bailey castle was constructed on Sand Point and Middle Hope after the Norman Conquest.	1008114	Upload Photo	
Motte at Castle Batch	Worle	Motte-and-bailey castle	Middle Ages	ST 36172 63707; 51°22′08″N 2°55′06″W	Castle Batch was a motte constructed by the Norman lord Walter of Douai between the Norman Conquest of England in 1066 and 1086. It was built on a ridge above the surrounding area, with a mound that is now 3 metres (9.8 ft) high and 42 metres (138 ft) across, surrounded by a ditch up to 10 metres (33 ft) wide. The entrance was probably on the north side of the motte. A possible bailey has been identified alongside the motte. Although typically characterised as a motte, the mound has a slight indentation in the centre and historian Stuart Prior considers the mound to have been a ringwork.	1011131	Motte at Castle Batch	
Nailsea Glassworks	Nailsea	Glassworks	1790	ST 47677 70843; 51°26′03″N 2°45′15″W	The remaining site and buildings of a glassworks which operated from 1788 until 1874. The visible remains include parts of kilns and ancillary buildings. The site was excavated in 1983 as part of the construction of a new ring road over part of the site.	1021462	Nailsea Glassworks More images	
Oval barrow on Felton Hill 100 m east of The Round House	Winford	Oval barrow	Neolithic	ST 51624 64906; 51°22′52″N 2°41′47″W	An oval barrow which is approximately 1 metre (3 ft 3 in) high, 16 metres (52 ft) long and 20 metres (66 ft) wide.	1008300	Upload Photo	
Parts of a minor Romano-British villa and later medieval barn 545 m south east of St Mary's Well	Portishead	Roman villa	Romano-British	ST 46604 75456; 51°28′32″N 2°46′13″W	The buried remains of a Roman villa which had a barn built over it between the 13th and 15th centuries.	1007001	Upload Photo	
Roman small town, part of an associated field system and earlier Iron Age settlement remains at Gatcombe, 250 m north of Cambridge Batch	Long Ashton	Earthworks	Iron Age and Romano-British	ST 52691 69975; 51°25′32″N 2°40′56″W	This was an Iron Age settlement Romanised in the late first century. It grew to become a commercial agricultural centre which was abandoned by about 200 AD. Around 300 AD a defensive wall was constructed up to 5 metres (16 ft) thick enclosing an area of about 7 hectares (17 acres). Remains include both a mosaic pavement and evidence of industrial activities, and coins shows that the site was occupied throughout the Roman period. The site may have been finally abandoned during an outbreak of bubonic plague in the middle of the sixth century.	1011978	Upload Photo	
Romano-British villa, Banwell	Banwell	Roman villa	Romano-British	ST 39822 59315; 51°19′47″N 2°51′54″W	Building platforms from a Roman villa, which included a bath house, with a mosaic floor over a hypocaust, a courtyard and other buildings.	1013434	Upload Photo	
Shrunken medieval village of Christon and associated field system 200 m north of Manor Farm	Loxton	Earthworks	Middle Ages	ST 37690 57574; 51°18′50″N 2°53′43″W	Earthworks for a deserted village which covered around 2.5 hectares (6.2 acres). A surrounding field system includes strip lynchets.	1008186	Upload Photo	
Slight univallate hillfort and associated earthworks on Burrington Ham	Burrington	Hillfort	Iron Age	ST 47803 58789; 51°19′28″N 2°44′22″W	Burrington Camp, also known as Burrington Ham, is an Iron Age hillfort situated in the Mendip Hills approximately 0.6 miles (0.97 km) south from the village of Burrington. The camp overlooks Burrington Combe, where there have been archaeological discoveries of cemeteries, demonstrating a very long human occupation of the area. The hillfort has an oval shape and is univallate.	1011261	Slight univallate hillfort and associated earthworks on Burrington Ham More images	
Slight univallate hillfort 150 m east of Cleeve Court	Cleeve	Hillfort	Late Bronze Age or Iron Age	ST 46257 65691; 51°23′16″N 2°46′25″W	An oval hillfort approximately 125 metres (410 ft) from east to west and 90 metres (300 ft) from north to south, surrounded by a bank and ditch.	1011263	Slight univallate hillfort 150 m east of Cleeve Court More images	
Slight univallate hillfort 115 m east of Brockley Cottage	Brockley	Hillfort	Iron Age	ST 47789 67096; 51°23′59″N 2°44′56″W	Taps Combe Camp (also known as Chelvey Batch Settlement) is an Iron Age hillfort situated approximately 1.8 miles (2.9 km) east from the village of Brockley. The hillfort is shaped like a "D", and is approximately 50 metres (160 ft) by 50 metres (160 ft) wide.	1007909	Upload Photo	
Slight univallate hillfort at Wain's Hill	Clevedon	Hillfort	Iron Age	ST 39085 70655; 51°25′54″N 2°52′41″W	Wain's Hill is an univallate Iron Age hillfort. The hillfort is defined by a steep, natural slope from the south and north with two ramparts to the east.	1007908	Slight univallate hillfort at Wain's Hill	
Slight univallate hillfort on Conygar Hill	Portbury	Hillfort	Iron Age	ST 49896 75094; 51°28′21″N 2°43′22″W	Conygar Hillfort is a small multivallate Iron Age hillfort. The fort is triangular in shape and there are the remains of a 3 feet (0.91 m) high bank on the south-western side.	1007918	Upload Photo	
Slight univallate hillfort, two avenues, saucer barrow, regular aggregate field system and associated earthworks on Walton Common	Walton Common	Hillfort	Bronze Age and Iron Age	ST 43027 73868; 51°27′39″N 2°49′17″W	Earthworks form a hillfort surrounded by a bank and ditch and associated saucer shaped round barrow and field system.	1007917	Upload Photo	
Slight univallate hillfort and associated settlement remains 300 m north-east of Cleeve Court	Cleeve	Hillfort	Late Bronze Age or Iron Age	ST 46298 65908; 51°23′23″N 2°46′24″W	A sloping oval hillfort which is 50 metres (160 ft) from east to west and 45 metres (148 ft) from north to south, surrounded by a bank and ditch.	1011264	Upload Photo	
Stokeleigh Camp: a promontory fort in Leigh Woods	Leigh Woods	Hillfort	Iron Age	ST 55901 73331; 51°27′25″N 2°38′15″W	Stokeleigh Camp is one of three Iron Age fortifications overlooking the Avon Gorge, the others being Burwalls south of the Nightingale Valley, of which almost no trace remains, and the other being Clifton Camp on the opposite side of the gorge, on Clifton Down near the Observatory. Stokeleigh Camp is situated on a promontory, and occupies around 3.0 hectares (7.5 acres).	1008113	Stokeleigh Camp: a promontory fort in Leigh Woods	
The Fairy Toot long barrow 350 m SSW of Howgrove Farm	Nempnett Thrubwell	Long barrow	Neolithic	ST 52056 61808; 51°21′11″N 2°41′24″W	The Fairy Toot is an extensive oval barrow. It is an example of the Severn-Cotswold tomb type which consist of precisely-built, long trapezoid earth mounds covering a burial chamber. Because of this they are a type of chambered long barrow. The Fairy Toot south-southwest of Howgrove Farm is a mound 60 m long, 25 m wide and now 2.5 m high, retained by a stone wall. Its summit is covered with ash trees and shrubs. Formerly it was considerably higher. On being opened and essentially destroyed between 1787 and 1835 it was found to contain two rows of cells, running from south to north, formed by immense stones set edgeways, and covered by others of larger dimensions. A human skull from the barrow is now in the Bristol Museum and Art Gallery.	1008181	Upload Photo	
Two bowl barrows 400 m north-east of Quarry Farm: part of the Redhill round barrow cemetery	Wrington	Bowl barrow	Bronze Age	ST 50747 63897; 51°22′19″N 2°42′32″W	Two bowl barrows, one 15 metres (49 ft) wide and the other 25 metres (82 ft).	1011127	Upload Photo	
Two bowl barrows on Shiplate Slait	Loxton	Bowl barrows	Neolithic to Bronze Age	ST 36581 57090; 51°18′34″N 2°54′40″W	Two bowl barrows, one 8 metres (26 ft) wide and the other 7 metres (23 ft).	1008112	Upload Photo	
Two confluent bowl barrows on Felton Hill	Winford	Bowl barrow	Neolithic to Bronze Age	ST 51958 64820; 51°22′49″N 2°41′30″W	Two confluent bowl barrows, one 22 metres (72 ft) in diameter and the other 21 metres (69 ft).	1008361	Upload Photo	
Two Palmerstonian gun batteries on Steep Holm	Steep Holm	Palmerston Fort	1860s	ST 22488 60683; 51°20′24″N 3°06′51″W	Steep Holm is an English island lying in the Bristol Channel. It formed part of a line of defences, known as Palmerston Forts, built across the channel to protect the approaches to Bristol and Cardiff. Construction began in 1865 and was completed in 1869. These facilities were updated in both World War I and World War II.	1005415	Two Palmerstonian gun batteries on Steep Holm More images	
Wick St. Lawrence village cross	Wick St Lawrence	Cross	15th century	ST 36605 65388; 51°23′02″N 2°54′45″W	A 15th century village cross standing on an area of grass opposite the parish church, raised up on five ascending octagonal stone platforms.	1015513	Wick St. Lawrence village cross	
Woodspring Priory and associated fishponds and field system	Kewstoke	Priory	15th century	ST 34292 66105; 51°23′27″N 2°56′42″W	Woodspring Priory is a former Augustinian priory. The priory was founded, by William de Courtney, in the early 13th century. It was dissolved in 1536 and then owned by local noblemen and leased to local farmers. In 1968 the priory and adjoining land of Middle Hope was purchased by the National Trust as part of Project Neptune. The following year the priory was taken over by the Landmark Trust who spent 20 years on restoration work, and now rent out the farmhouse as holiday accommodation. The surviving buildings include the priory church, which was a 15th century replacement for the earlier 13th century structure, infirmary, barn and 16th century prior's lodging which was converted into a farmhouse. The whole site was arranged around a central cloister from which only the east wall and west wall of the chapter house remain, the sacristy, refectory, chapter house, lady chapel and parlour having been demolished.	1012722	Woodspring Priory and associated fishponds and field system More images	
Worlebury Camp: a large multivallate hillfort on Worlebury Hill	Weston-super-Mare	Hillfort	Iron Age	ST 31282 62493; 51°21′27″N 2°59′07″W	Worlebury Camp is an Iron Age hillfort once stood atop Worlebury Hill. This fort was designed for defence, as is evidenced the number of walls and ditches around the site. Archaeologists have found several large triangular platforms around the sides of the fort, lower down on the hillside. They have found nearly one hundred storage pits of various sizes cut into the bedrock, and many of these had human remains, coins, and other artefacts in them.	1011260	Worlebury Camp: a large multivallate hillfort on Worlebury Hill More images	

== See also ==
- Scheduled Monuments in Somerset
- Grade I listed buildings in North Somerset
- Grade II* listed buildings in North Somerset
