= Scheduled monuments in Somerset =

Nationally important sites in Somerset, England

Unitary authorities of Somerset

1 Somerset Council
2 North Somerset
3 Bath and North East Somerset

There are over 670 scheduled monuments in the ceremonial county of Somerset in South West England.

The area is administered by three unitary authorities. Two of them were established on 1 April 1996 following the breakup of the county of Avon; they are North Somerset and Bath and North East Somerset. These unitary authorities include areas that were once part of Somerset before the creation of Avon in 1974.

The rest of the county is administered by Somerset Council, which was established on 1 April 2023 to replace Somerset County Council and four districts – South Somerset, Mendip, Sedgemoor and Somerset West and Taunton. West Somerset and Taunton Deane previously existed until 1 April 2019 when they merged to form Somerset West and Taunton.

A scheduled monument is a nationally important archaeological site or monument which is given legal protection by being placed on a list (or "schedule") by the Secretary of State for Culture, Media and Sport; English Heritage takes the leading role in identifying such sites. The current legislation governing this is the Ancient Monuments and Archaeological Areas Act 1979. The term "monument" can apply to the whole range of archaeological sites, and they are not always visible above ground. Such sites have to have been deliberately constructed by human activity. They range from prehistoric standing stones and burial sites, through Roman remains and medieval structures such as castles and monasteries, to later structures such as industrial sites and buildings constructed for the World Wars or the Cold War.

For ease of reference, lists of scheduled monuments in the county are organised by unitary authority and then by former district area.

== Bath and North East Somerset ==
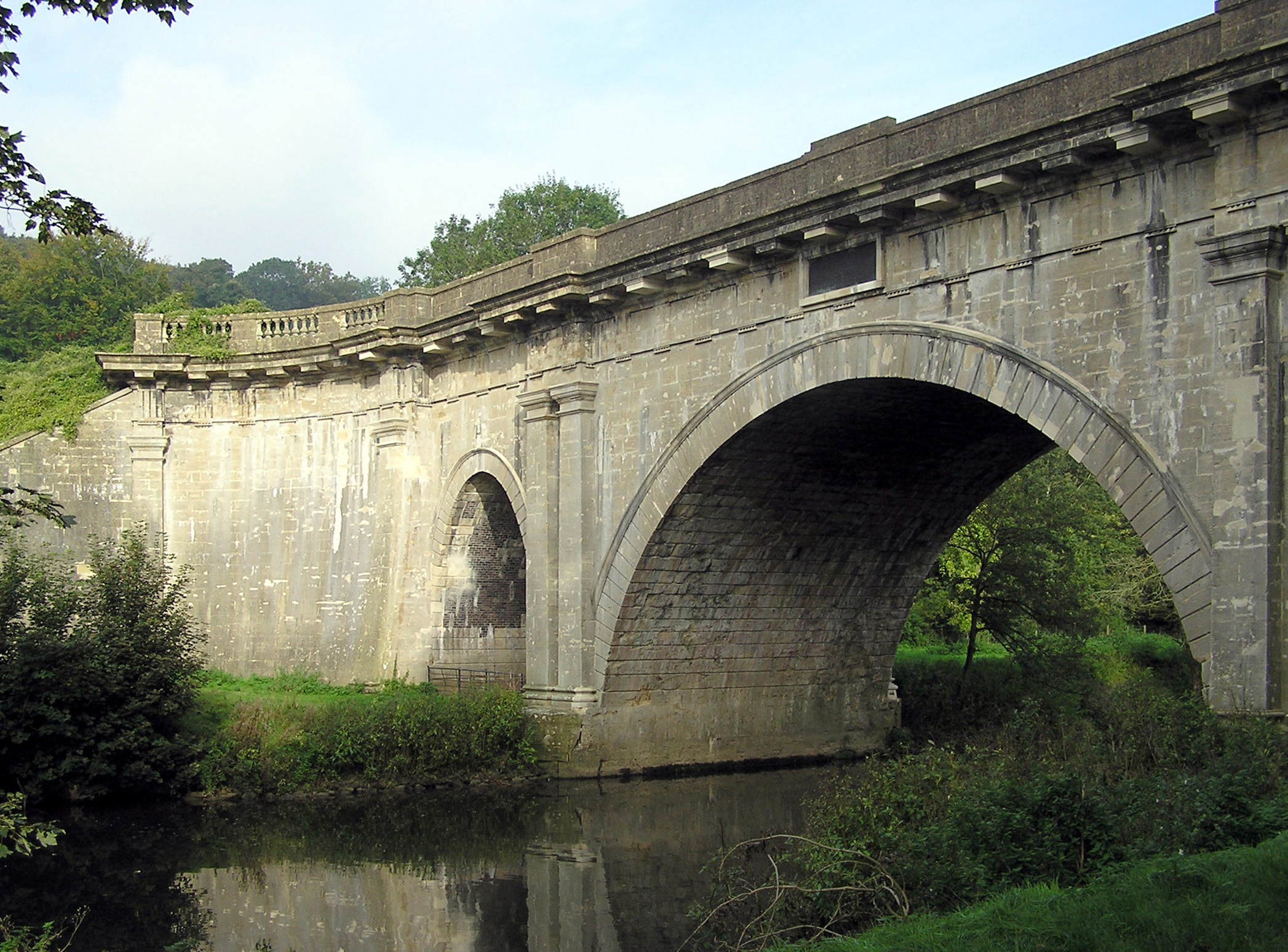
Dundas Aqueduct carries the Kennet and Avon Canal over the River Avon and the Wessex Main Line railway. It was built by John Rennie between 1797 and 1801 and completed in 1805.

Bath and North East Somerset (commonly referred to as BANES or B&NES) is a unitary authority created on 1 April 1996, following the abolition of the County of Avon. Bath and North East Somerset occupies an area of 220 square miles (570 km^{2}), two-thirds of which is green belt. BANES stretches from the outskirts of Bristol, south into the Mendip Hills, and east to the southern Cotswold Hills and the Wiltshire border. The city of Bath is the principal settlement in the district, but BANES also covers Keynsham, Midsomer Norton, Radstock and the Chew Valley.

There are 58 scheduled monuments in Bath and North East Somerset. Some of the oldest are Neolithic, including the Stanton Drew stone circles and several tumuli. The Great Circle at Stanton Drew is the second largest stone circle in Britain (after Avebury); it is considered to be one of the largest Neolithic monuments to have been built. The date of construction is not known but is thought to be between 3000 and 2000 BCE which places it in the Late Neolithic to Early Bronze Age. There are also several Iron Age hill forts such as the one at Maes Knoll, which is connected to the Wansdyke medieval defensive earthwork, several sections of which are included in this list. The Romano-British period is represented with several sites, most notably the Roman Baths and city walls in Bath. More recent sites include several bridges, with dates ranging from the Middle Ages to the 18th-century Palladian bridge in Prior Park Landscape Garden. Dundas Aqueduct, built in 1805 to carry the Kennet and Avon Canal, is the most recent site in the list.

== North Somerset ==
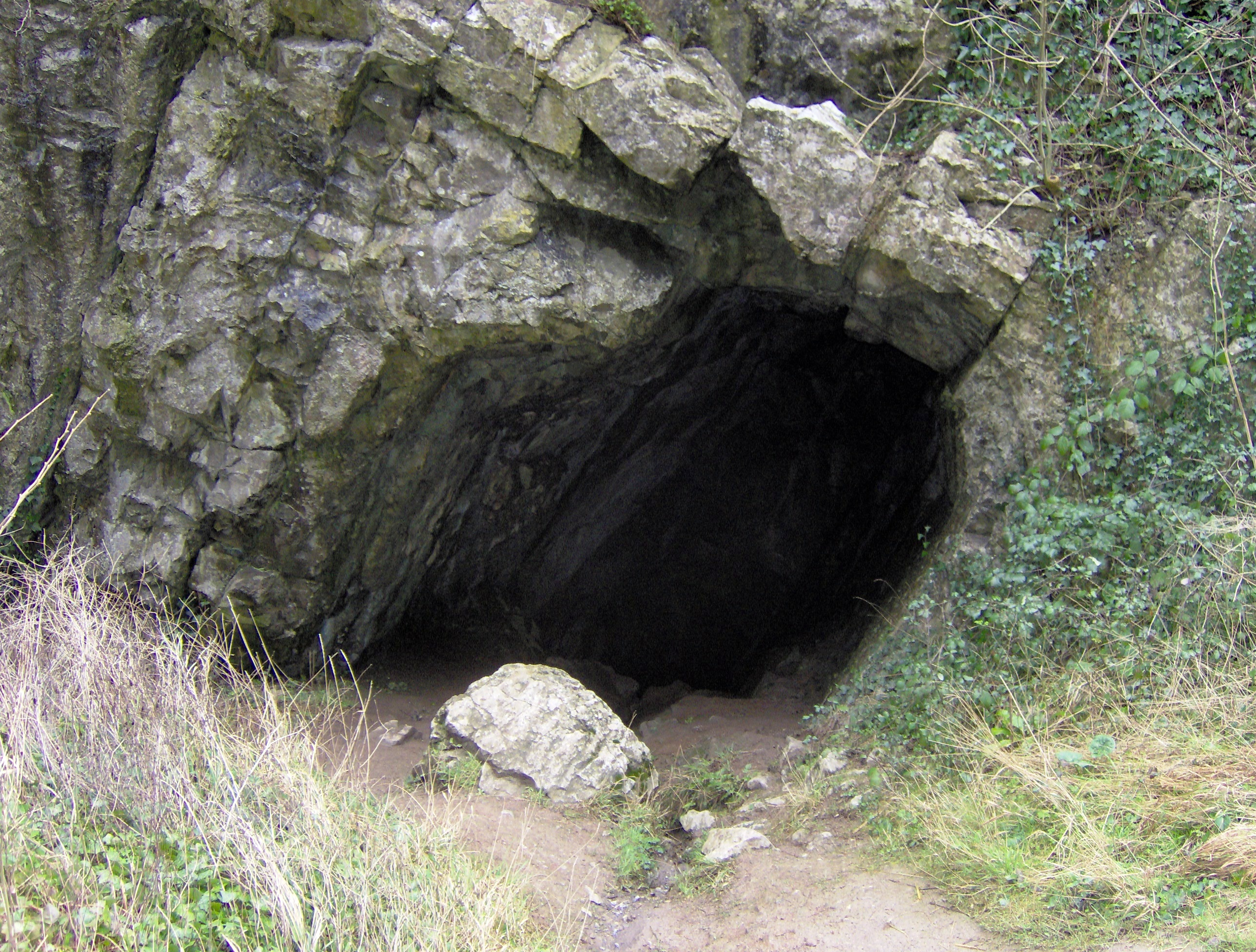
Aveline's Hole, a cave in Burrington Combe, is the earliest scientifically dated cemetery in Great Britain.

North Somerset is a unitary authority.

There are 68 scheduled monuments in North Somerset. Some of the oldest are Neolithic including Aveline's Hole, a cave which is the earliest scientifically dated cemetery in Britain, and several tumuli. There are also several Iron Age hill forts such as the one at Worlebury Camp. Dolebury Warren – another Iron Age hill fort – was reused as a medieval rabbit warren. The Romano-British period is represented with several sites, including villas.

More recent sites include several motte-and-bailey castles, such as Locking Castle; and church crosses which date from the Middle Ages. There are also several deserted medieval settlements. Woodspring Priory is a former Augustinian priory founded in the early 13th century. More recent sites date from the industrial revolution and include the Elms colliery and glassworks in Nailsea. The most recent monuments are two Palmerstonian gun batteries on the island of Steep Holm.

== Somerset (district) ==
=== Mendip ===
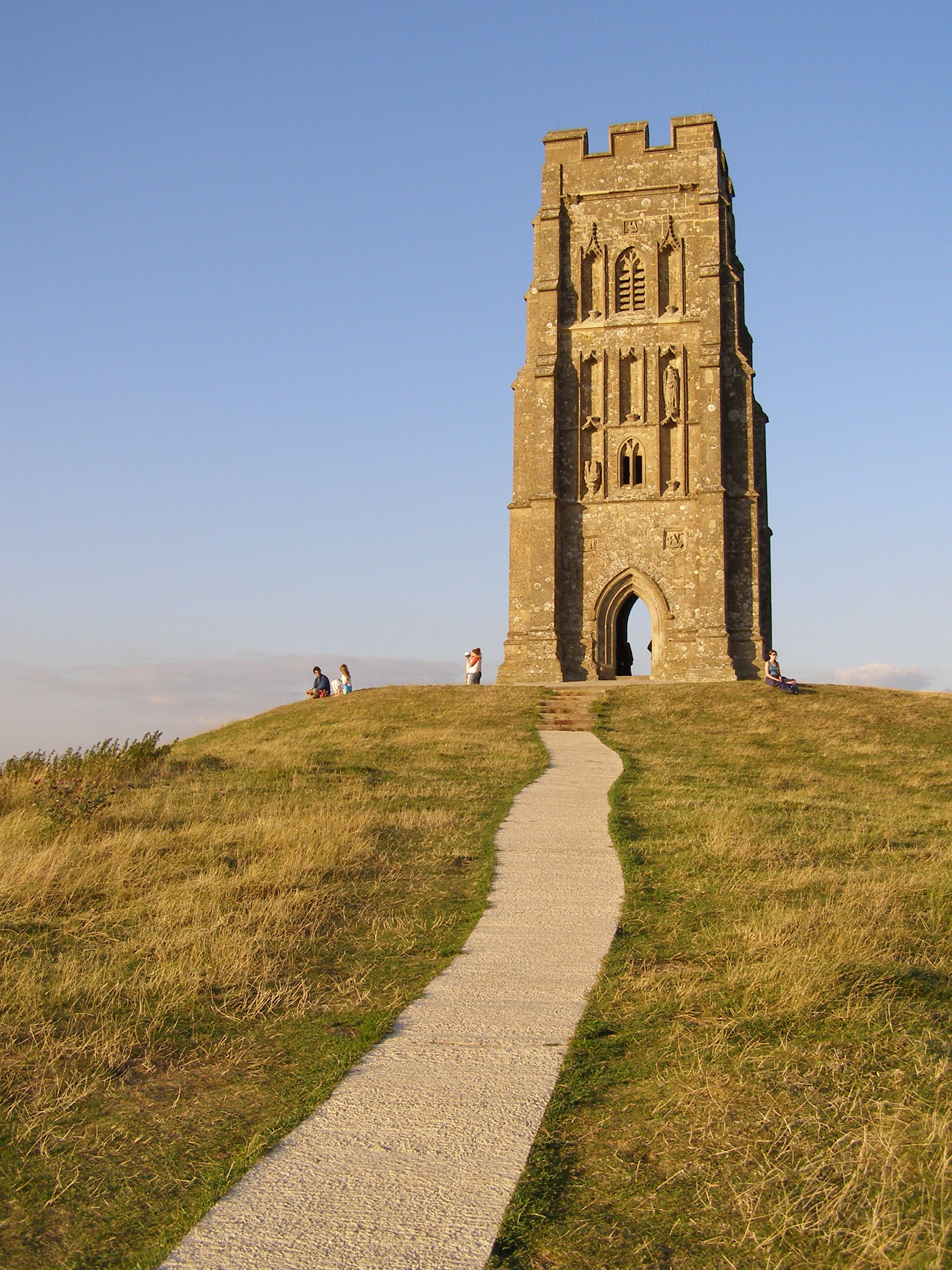
St Michael's church on the summit of Glastonbury Tor

Mendip is a former local government district which covers a largely rural area of 285 square miles (738 km^{2}) ranging from the Mendip Hills through on to the Somerset Levels.

There are 233 scheduled monuments in Mendip. These include a large number of bowl and round barrows and other neolithic, Bronze and Iron Age tumuli such as the Priddy Circles and Priddy Nine Barrows and Ashen Hill Barrow Cemeteries. There are also several Iron Age hill forts on the hilltops, and lake villages on the lowlands such as Meare and Glastonbury Lake Villages. The lake villages were often connected by timber trackways such as the Sweet Track. There are several Roman sites, particularly around the Charterhouse Roman Town and its associated lead mines. Some later coal mining sites are also included in the list.

Two major religious sites in Mendip at Glastonbury Abbey and Wells Cathedral, and their precincts and dispersed residences, tithe barns and The Abbot's Fish House also figure prominently in the list. Prehistoric defensive features such as Ponter's Ball Dyke were supplemented in the medieval period by motte-and-bailey castles such as Farleigh Hungerford, Nunney and Fenny Castle. Commercial and industrial development is represented by the Old Iron Works at Mells and various market crosses. The most recent monuments are World War II bunkers and bombing decoys on Black Down, the highest point of the Mendip Hills, which also appear on the Sedgemoor list as the site crosses the boundary between the districts.

=== Sedgemoor ===
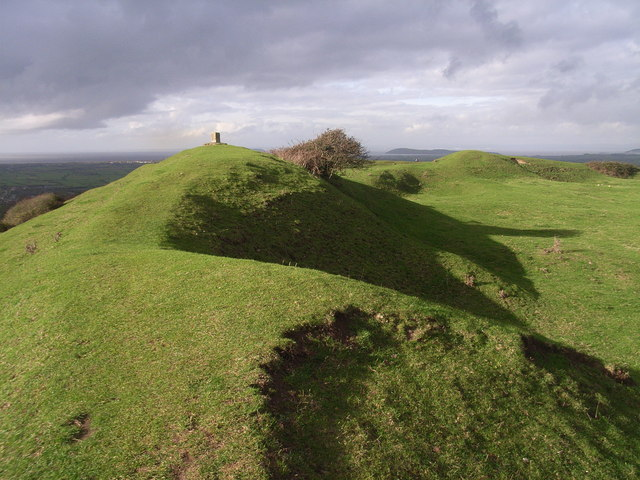
Brent Knoll Camp has artefacts from the Bronze, Iron and Roman ages.

The former district of Sedgemoor is a low-lying area of land close to sea level between the Quantock and Mendip hills, historically largely marsh (or moor). It contains the bulk of the area also known as the Somerset Levels, including Europe's oldest known engineered roadway, the Sweet Track.

There are 79 scheduled monuments in Sedgemoor. Some of the oldest are Neolithic, Bronze Age or Iron Age including hill forts, Bowl barrows and occupied caves including several in Cheddar Gorge. Cannington Camp (which is also known as Cynwit Castle) dates from the Bronze Age, while Brent Knoll Camp between the Somerset Levels and Brean Down is Iron Age (although there are some Bronze Age artefacts and it was reused in the Roman period. The Romano-British period is represented with several sites. More recent sites include several motte-and-bailey castles and church or village crosses which date from the Middle Ages. Industrial development, particularly in Bridgwater, are represented by brick and tile kilns and a telescopic railway bridge.

=== South Somerset ===
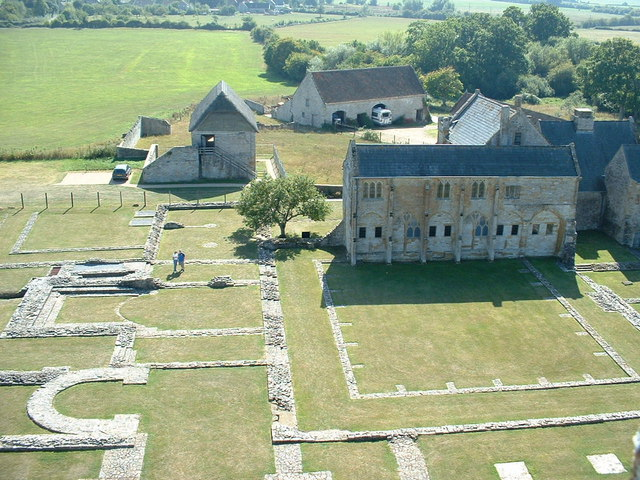
The remains of Muchelney Abbey, founded in the 7th or 8th century

The South Somerset former district occupies an area of 370 square miles (958 km^{2}), stretching from its borders with Devon and Dorset to the edge of the Somerset Levels.

There are 69 scheduled monuments in South Somerset. Some of the oldest are Neolithic, Bronze Age or Iron Age including hill forts, such as Kenwalch's Castle and Bowl barrows. The Romano-British period is represented with several sites including the Low Ham Roman Villa which had an extensive mosaic floor, now on display in the Museum of Somerset. Religious sites are represented by Muchelney Abbey, which was founded in the 7th or 8th century, and Montacute Priory, a Cluniac priory of the Benedictine order, from the 11th. Bruton Abbey was founded by the Benedictines before becoming a house of Augustinian canons. Stoke sub Hamdon Priory was formed in 1304 as a chantry college rather than a priory.

More recent sites include several motte-and-bailey castles such as Cary Castle, and church crosses which date from the Middle Ages. Several packhorse bridges, such as Bow Bridge at Plox also appear in the list. The most recent monuments include the Round House, a village lock-up in Castle Cary dating from 1779.

=== Taunton Deane ===
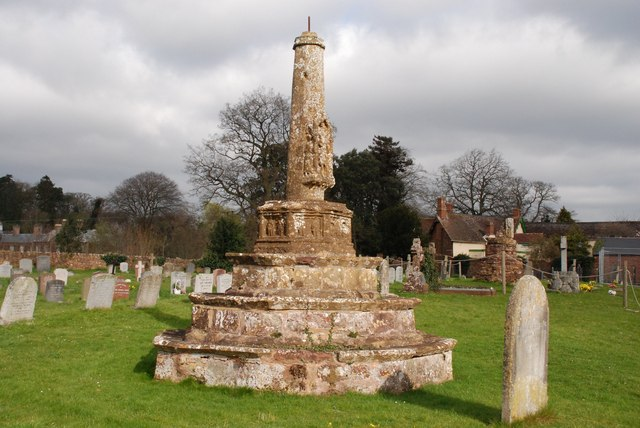
14th-century cross in the churchyard of the Church of St Mary, Bishops Lydeard

The former district of Taunton Deane has an area of 462 square kilometres (178 sq mi).

There are 33 scheduled monuments in Taunton Deane. Many of them are Neolithic through to the Bronze and Iron Ages such as bowl barrows, cairns along with hill forts such as Norton Camp. Castle Neroche was an Iron Age hill fort which was reused as a Norman motte-and-bailey castle. Burrow Mump shows evidence or Roman use but is better known as a Norman motte-and-bailey castle, and later church. It was presented, in 1946, by Major Alexander Gould Barrett, to the National Trust and serves as a memorial to the 11,281 Somerset men who lost their lives during the first and second world wars.

The medieval period is represented by several churchyard and village crosses. The defensive walls and part of Taunton Castle, which has Anglo-Saxon origins and was expanded during the Medieval and Tudor eras, are included. More recent sites include Poundisford Park, Buckland Priory, Bradford Bridge and a duck decoy from the 17th century. Some of the sites such as Balt Moor Wall are of uncertain date. The most recent are air traffic control buildings, pillboxes and fighter pens from RAF Culmhead, at Churchstanton on the Blackdown Hills.

=== West Somerset ===
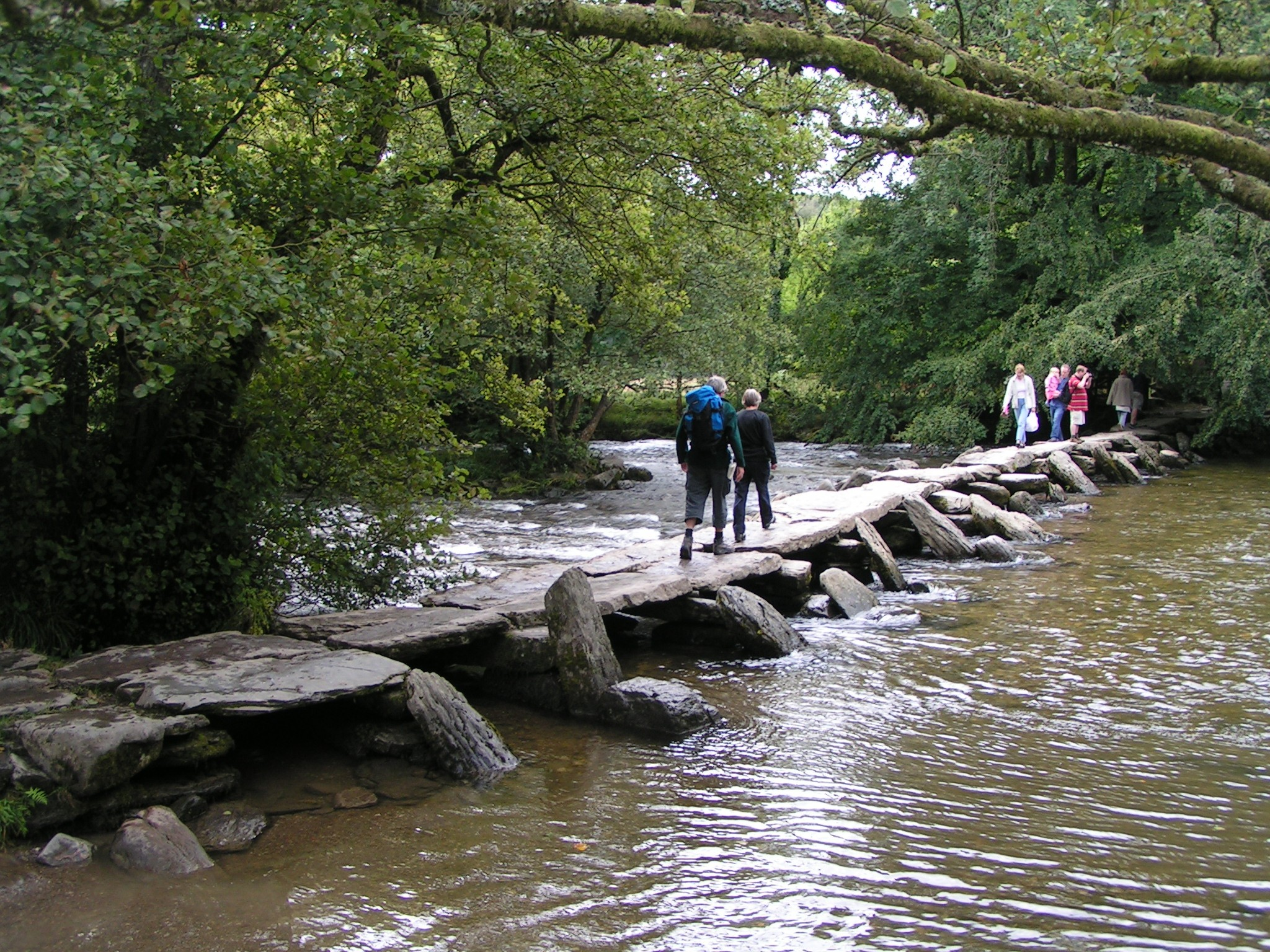
Tarr Stepsa clapper bridge across the River Barle in the Exmoor National Park

The West Somerset former local government district covers a largely rural area, including parts of Exmoor, and has an area of 740 square kilometres (290 sq mi). The largest centres of population are the coastal towns of Minehead and Watchet.

There are 202 scheduled monuments in West Somerset. Some of the oldest, particularly on Exmoor and the Quantock Hills are Neolithic, Bronze Age or Iron Age including hill forts, cairns, bowl barrows and other tumuli. More recent sites include several motte-and-bailey castles. Dunster Castle has been fortified since the late Anglo-Saxon period. After the Norman Conquest of England in the 11th century, William de Mohun constructed a timber castle on the site as part of the pacification of Somerset. A stone shell keep was built on the motte by the start of the 12th century, and the castle survived a siege during the early years of the Anarchy. At the end of the 14th century the de Mohuns sold the castle to the Luttrell family, who expanded it several times during the 17th and 18th centuries. The medieval castle walls were mostly destroyed following the siege of Dunster Castle at the end of the English Civil War. In the 1860s and 1870s, the architect Anthony Salvin was employed to remodel the castle to fit Victorian tastes; this work extensively changed the appearance of Dunster to make it appear more Gothic and Picturesque. In 1976 Colonel Walter Luttrell gave Dunster Castle and most of its contents to the National Trust, which operates it as a tourist attraction.

There are also several church or village crosses which date from the Middle Ages. Other sites of religious significance include Cleeve Abbey which was founded by William de Roumare, Earl of Lincoln in a grant of 1191, on land he had been given by king Æthelred the Unready. The geography with large numbers of streams is reflected by the number of packhorse bridges, such as Gallox Bridge and Robber's Bridge, included in the list. The mining history of the area is also represented by several sections of the West Somerset Mineral Railway and associated ruins of mine buildings which are now scheduled. The most recent monuments are World War II pillboxes. The village of Dunster provides the highest concentration of monuments, ranging from Iron Age forts to the castle, and Yarn Market which was built around 1600.
