= Locked in =

Locked in or lock in may refer to:

== Arts and entertainment ==
- Locked In (album), a 1976 album by Wishbone Ash
- "Locked In", a 1986 song by Judas Priest from the album Turbo Lover
- Locked In (2010 film), a 2010 thriller drama
- Locked In (2023 film), a 2023 psychological thriller
- "Locked In" (House), an episode of the TV series
- Lock In, a 2014 novel by John Scalzi
- "Locked In", a 2025 song by Aitch featuring Tamera from the album 4
- "Locked In", a 2026 song by Babymonster from the EP Choom

== Other uses ==
- Flow (psychology), an emotional state
- Vendor lock-in, in economics
- Lock-in amplifier, a type of amplifier
- Locked-in syndrome, a medical condition
- Locked in period, in stock trading
- Lock-in, a variant of a lockout in industrial disputes
- Lock-in (pub), when a pub owner allows patrons to stay past closing time

== See also ==
- Lockdown (disambiguation)
- Lockin (disambiguation)
- Lock-on (disambiguation)
