= Locked On =

Locked On may refer to:

- Locked On Podcast Network, also known as Locked On Sports, an American sports podcast circle
- Locked On Records, a music recording sales company
- Locked On (novel), a novel by Tom Clancy and Mark Greaney
- "Locked On", a song by Jerry Cantrell from Degradation Trip Vol 1 & 2

== See also ==
- Lock-on (disambiguation)
