= Lockin =

Lockin may refer to:

- Lockin effect in superconductivity
- Danny Lockin (1943–1977), American actor and dancer

== See also ==
- Locking (disambiguation)
- Locked in (disambiguation), including "Lock-in"
- Login (disambiguation)
