= Locked Down =

Locked Down can refer to:

- Lockdown, an emergency protocol to prevents people or information from leaving an area
- "Locked Down" (song), a 2003 single by Turbonegro
- Locked Down, a 2010 American-Canadian crime film starring Vinnie Jones
- Locked Down (album), a 2012 album by Dr. John
- "Locked Down", a 2018 episode of One Day at a Time
- Locked Down (film), a 2021 American crime thriller set during the COVID-19 pandemic

== See also ==
- Lockdown (disambiguation)
