= Locking =

Locking may refer to:

- Locking (computer science)
- Locking, Somerset, a village and civil parish in the United Kingdom
  - RAF Locking, a former Royal Air Force base
  - Locking Castle, a former castle
- Brian Locking (born 1938), rock guitarist
- Norm Locking (1911–1995), National Hockey League player
- Locking (dance), a style of funk dance invented in the early 1970s
- Prevention of a screw thread from turning when undesired

== See also ==
- Lockin (disambiguation)
- Lock (disambiguation)
