= Hartley Wood and Co =

- Industry: Glass Manufacturing
- Predecessor: James Hartley and Co, c1836-c1860; Hartley and Kayll, c1860-c1869; James Hartley and Co Ltd, 1893-c1915; The Portobello Glass Co Ltd, c1892-1895; Hartley Wood and Co, 1895–1989; 1990–1992; Hartley Wood and Co Ltd, 1992–1997
- Founded: 1812; 214 years ago
- Founder: John Hartley
- Defunct: November 1997
- Fate: Acquired by Pilkington
- Headquarters: England

Hartley Wood and Co Ltd were a company of glass manufacturers established in Sunderland, England.

== The Hartley family ==
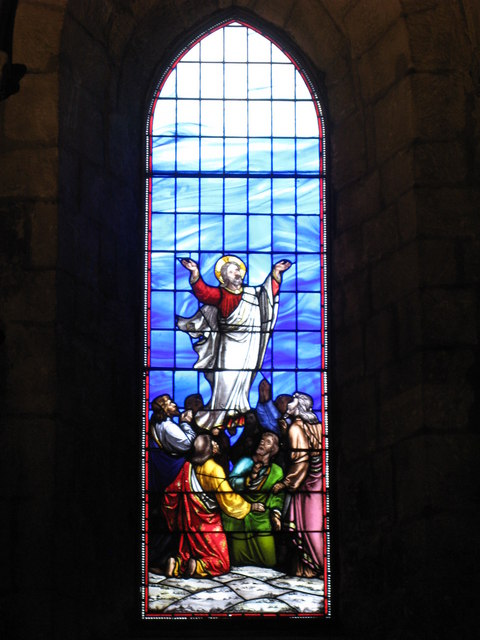
The Ascension window at Hexham Abbey – hand made with Hartley Wood glass

John Hartley of Dumbarton, Scotland, moved to the Nailsea, near Bristol, England, in 1812 and began working with Robert Lucas Chance at the Nailsea Glassworks. On 1 April 1828, he transferred to the British Crown Glass Company manufactory at Oldbury (then Worcestershire), which had been bought up by Robert Lucas Chance in 1822. By 1832 British Crown Glass was experimenting with the new sheet glass manufacturing method, which required French workers to make it and this was not favoured by Hartley's two sons, James Hartley(1811-1886) and John Hartley(1813-1884). After John Hartley Snr. died in 1833, the two brothers were taken into partnership by Robert Lucas Chance in 1834 and the firm became known as Chances and Hartleys in 1834.

In 1836 the Hartley brothers left Chances and Hartleys (which then became Chance Brothers and Company) due to differences of opinions regarding the viability of sheet glass. The brothers then moved north to Sunderland to set up their own business. The reasons why Sunderland was chosen as the site for their new venture are unclear, but it may have been because other family members (uncles and cousins) were already established in the glass making industry there.

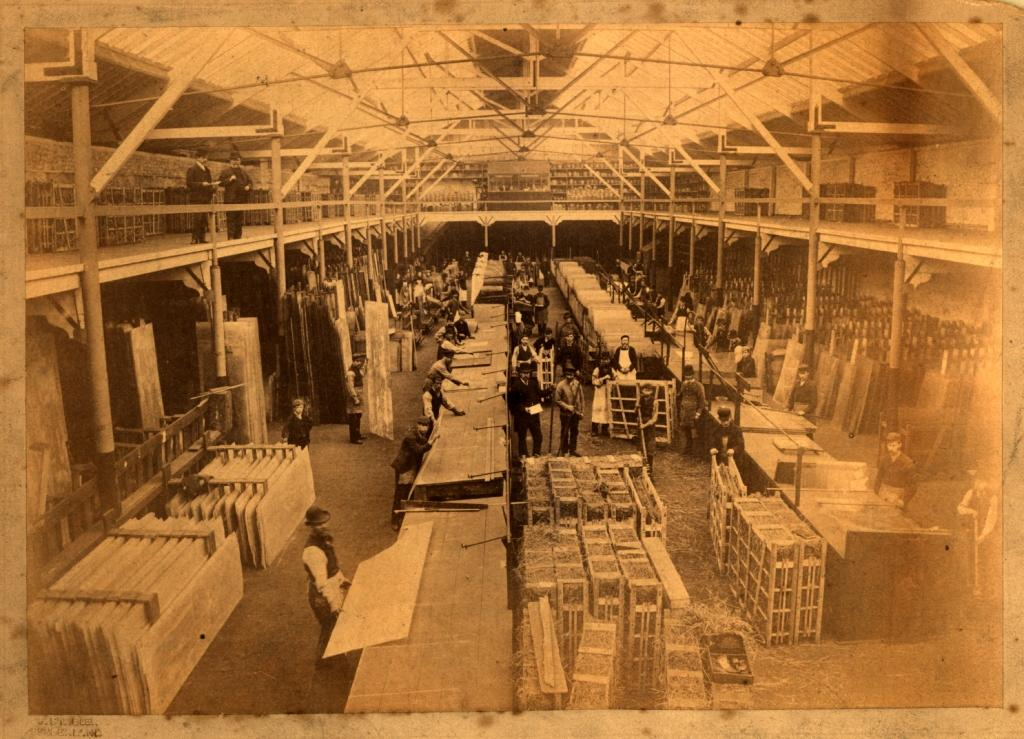
Packing shed at the Wear Glass Works in June 1889

The Wear Glass Works was established at the junction between Trimdon Street and Hylton Road, Deptford, Sunderland c 1836, trading as James Hartley and Co. Two years later, on 25 November 1838, James Hartley was granted a patent for Hartley's Patent Rolled Plate, manufactured by a new cast glass process, and the firm concentrated on this for the next fifty years. On 1 January 1840 John Hartley conveyed his share of the business to his brother, leaving James Hartley as a sole trader.

When James Hartley decided to retire from the business on 31 December 1869, a new partnership was forged comprising the two remaining partners from the existing partnership, together with John's younger brother, Thomas Blenkinsopp Hartley and Hartley Perks Kayll. At this point the Company style reverted to James Hartley and Co. When Thomas Blenkinsopp Hartley died in 1872 the other 3 partners continued the business. On 22 April 1878 John Hartley too retired from active participation in the business, leaving the Kaylls as co-partners. James Hartley died in London on 24 May 1886 and his share of the business was divided between his two surviving sons, James and John. A month after his father's death, James sold his interest in the glassworks to his brother.

Although the Wear Glass Works had been very successful for over half a century, in the 1880s business began to decline because new plate glass manufacturing methods developed by rival firms were not adopted at Hartleys. Family wrangling over the will of John Hartley, who died on 6 December 1889, exacerbated the situation, leading eventually to a Court of Chancery order for the sale of the Wear Glass Works in 1892. It was purchased first of all by a Trust which, in 1893, sold it on to a new firm, James Hartley and Co Ltd headed by James Hartley junior, son of John and grandson of James the founder. The Wear Glass Works continued to produce plate glass and James Hartley & Co Ltd continued to exist for several years after the foundation of the Portobello Glass Works, but by 1915 the factory had closed and the firm was wound up. To revitalise the firm, James Hartley decided to develop the manufacture of antique coloured glass which up to this time had been a sideline.

== The Wood family ==
Alfred Wood, a skilled colour mixer was invited to join the company from W E Chance & Co. Ltd, which he did in 1890.

Alfred Wood's father, George worked for Chance Brothers as a colour mixer until 1873 when he left the company to become freelance. In 1882 Alfred Wood suffered a breakdown of some kind which may have been the factor which led him to consider moving elsewhere.

In 1892, with the Wear Glass Works failing, James Hartley junior, established a second business making antique coloured glass at the Portobello Glass Works in Portobello Lane, Monkwearmouth. Alfred Wood became his works manager. James Hartley junior traded here as The Portobello Glass Co Ltd until March 1895 when he took Alfred Wood into partnership and the firm became Hartley Wood and Co. On 9 May 1908 the partnership was dissolved and Alfred Wood continued the business in partnership with his son, Alfred John Wood. In 1912 Alfred John Wood and his brother Gilbert Henry Wood bought out their father's share of the partnership and established a new partnership. Alfred Wood died in 1916. In 1914 trade directories describe the firm as manufacturers of antique, ambitty and Venetian glass.

Alfred J Wood died on 1 March 1948. The surviving partner, Gilbert Henry Wood took his son, Gilbert Hartley Wood (great-grandson of the founder) as a partner. A year later Allen Alder joined the firm, becoming a partner in 1952. Gilbert Henry Wood retired in 1957.

== Closure ==
The company was taken over by Pilkington in 1982 (Pilkington also acquired Chance Brothers) and ceased operation in July 1989. It resumed operation in 1992 and closed finally in November 1997.

The company's records from 1849 until closure are in Tyne and Wear Archives.
