= Login (disambiguation) =

Login allows access to a computer system through providing private credentials, such as a username and a password.

Login may also refer to:

== People ==
- John Spencer Login (1809–1863), Scottish surgeon in British India, guardian of Maharajah Duleep Singh and the Koh-i-Noor diamond
  - Lena, Lady Login (1820–1904), Scottish author and wife of John Spencer
- Samo and Iza Login, founders of Outfit7
- Thomas Login (1823–1874), Scottish civil engineer
- Login Geiden (Lodewijk van Heiden, 1772–1850), Dutch admiral

== Other uses ==
- Login, Carmarthenshire, a hamlet in Wales
- Login (film), a 2012 Hindi film
- Login (Japanese magazine), a computer game magazine
- ;login:, a technical journal

== See also ==
- Sam Loggin (born 1977), English actress
- Loggins, a surname
- Logging, the cutting and processing of trees
