= Sega Lock-On =

Laser tag game

Originally known as VR-SHOOTER, the Sega Lock-On is a laser tag game developed by Sega and originally released in 1992. It was particularly popular in Hong Kong and South Korea. There were three versions of this system made, unofficially called Mark I, Mark II and Voice Command Lock-On. The Mark I and Mark II versions operated the same and differed in their overall appearance. Each system consists of a headset and a gun for each player, the aim being to shoot the opponent's headset. The headset required one 9-Volt battery while the gun required two C batteries. The Mark II headset used four AAA batteries instead of the single 9V one. Each gun and headset was able to select between two teams, A and B. A gun set to team A could only hit a headset set to team B and vice versa. This way friendly fire was not possible.

The guns have a primary trigger which can be pressed once for a single shot or held for continuous fire, with an unlimited number of shots. A second trigger called the high power button is located on the left hand side of the gun and when pressed gives a quick tone indicating that a high powered shot is ready. If, within a few seconds, the main trigger is then pressed, a high power shot would be fired. This high power shot would take off three hit points from a headset, whereas a normal shot would take off one. When turned on, each headset would start at nine hit points and when shot would count down and display the remaining hit points. When they reached zero, the headset sounds a death tone and the player is tagged out.

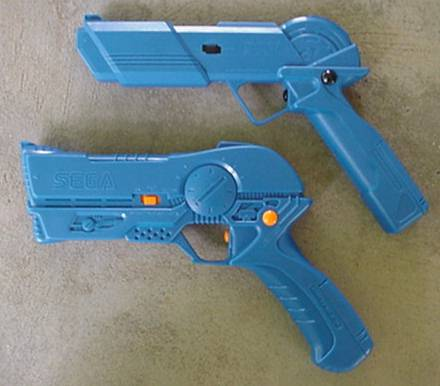
Mark I (above) and Mark II (below) guns

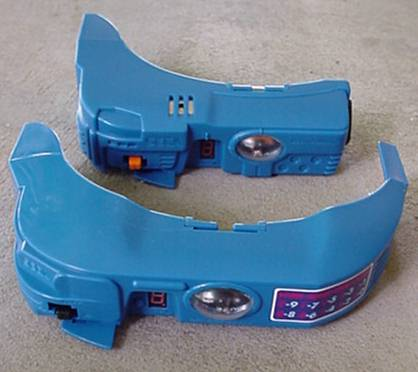
Mark I (below) and Mark II (above) headsets

Closeup of the Mark I triggers

There exists a way to perform target practice with a headset and gun. The user would activate the headset, and during the power-on process, would shoot at the headset from the gun. The headset would go dark and silent for a random period of time before beeping and lighting up, indicating a target to shoot. After a short interval, if the user didn't shoot it, it would go dark. The process would then continue.
