= Banwell Camp =

Iron Age hillfort in Somerset, England

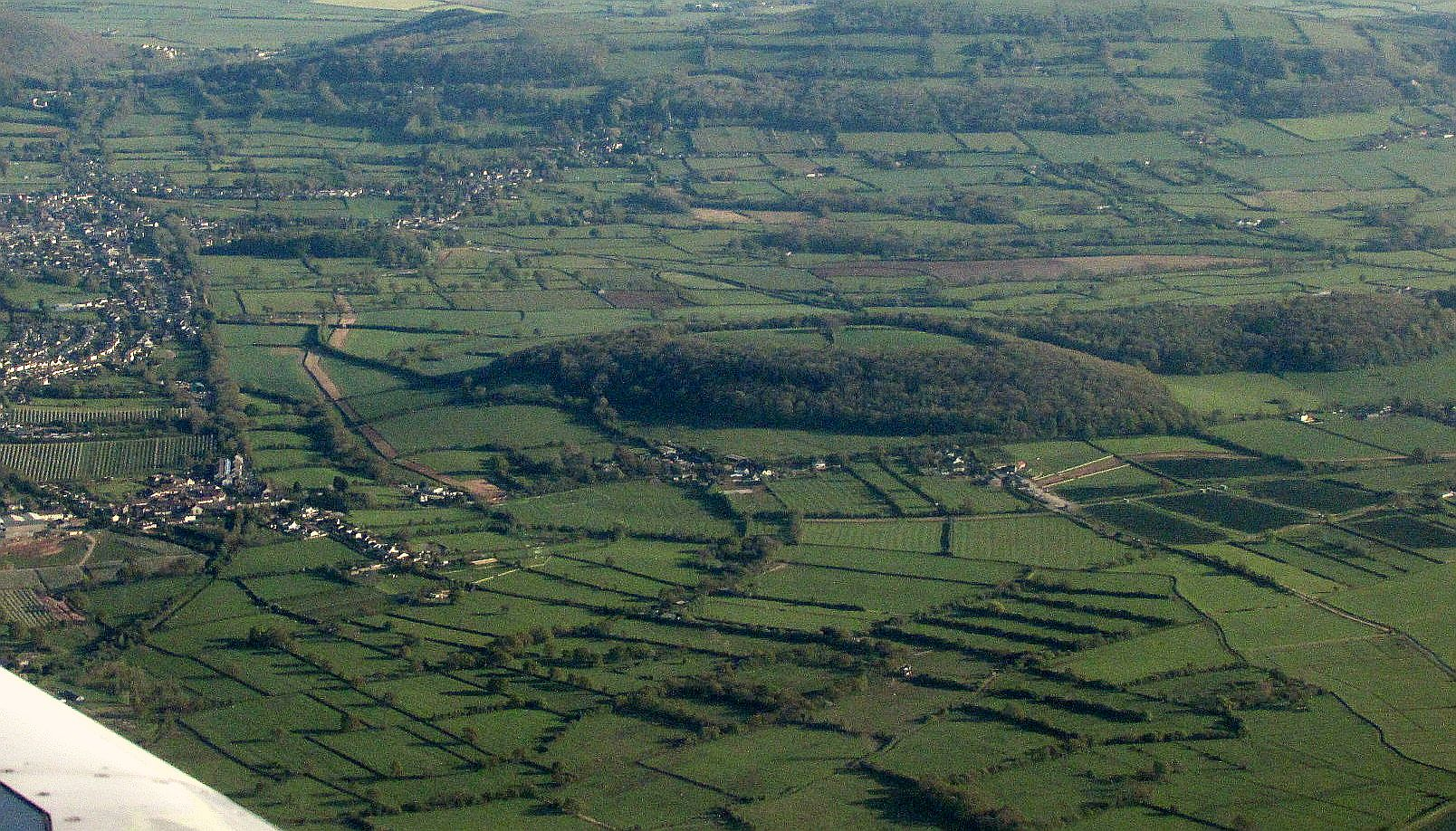
- Banwell Hill from the air

- Location within Somerset
- 51°19′37″N 2°50′56″W
- Location: Banwell, Somerset, England

History
- Built: Bronze Age – Iron Age

Site notes
- Area: 15 acres (6.1 ha)

Scheduled monument
- Official name: Banwell Camp
- Reference no.: 194460

Banwell Camp is a univallate Iron Age hill fort in the North Somerset district of Somerset, England. The hill fort is situated approximately 1.6 miles (2.6 km) east from the Village of Banwell. Some artefacts found on the site dates back to the Bronze Age and the Stone Age. In places it is surrounded by a 4 metres (13 ft) high bank and ditch.

In the late 1950s it was excavated by J.W. Hunt of the Banwell Society of Archaeology.

== Background ==
Hill forts developed in the Late Bronze and Early Iron Age, roughly the start of the first millennium BC. The reason for their emergence in Britain, and their purpose, has been a subject of debate. It has been argued that they could have been military sites constructed in response to invasion from continental Europe, sites built by invaders, or a military reaction to social tensions caused by an increasing population and consequent pressure on agriculture. The dominant view since the 1960s has been that the increasing use of iron led to social changes in Britain. Deposits of iron ore were located in different places to the tin and copper ore necessary to make bronze, and as a result trading patterns shifted and the old elites lost their economic and social status. Power passed into the hands of a new group of people. Archaeologist Barry Cunliffe believes that population increase still played a role and has stated "[the forts] provided defensive possibilities for the community at those times when the stress [of an increasing population] burst out into open warfare. But I wouldn't see them as having been built because there was a state of war. They would be functional as defensive strongholds when there were tensions and undoubtedly some of them were attacked and destroyed, but this was not the only, or even the most significant, factor in their construction".

A local folktale tells of the origin of Banwell Cross, carved into the earth at Banwell Hill. The Devil kept destroying all the villagers' efforts to build an upright cross, so they decided to foil him by creating a horizontal one instead.

== See also ==
- List of hill forts and ancient settlements in Somerset
