= Nailsea Glassworks =

English glass manufacturing factory

Coordinates: 51.4342°N 2.7540°W

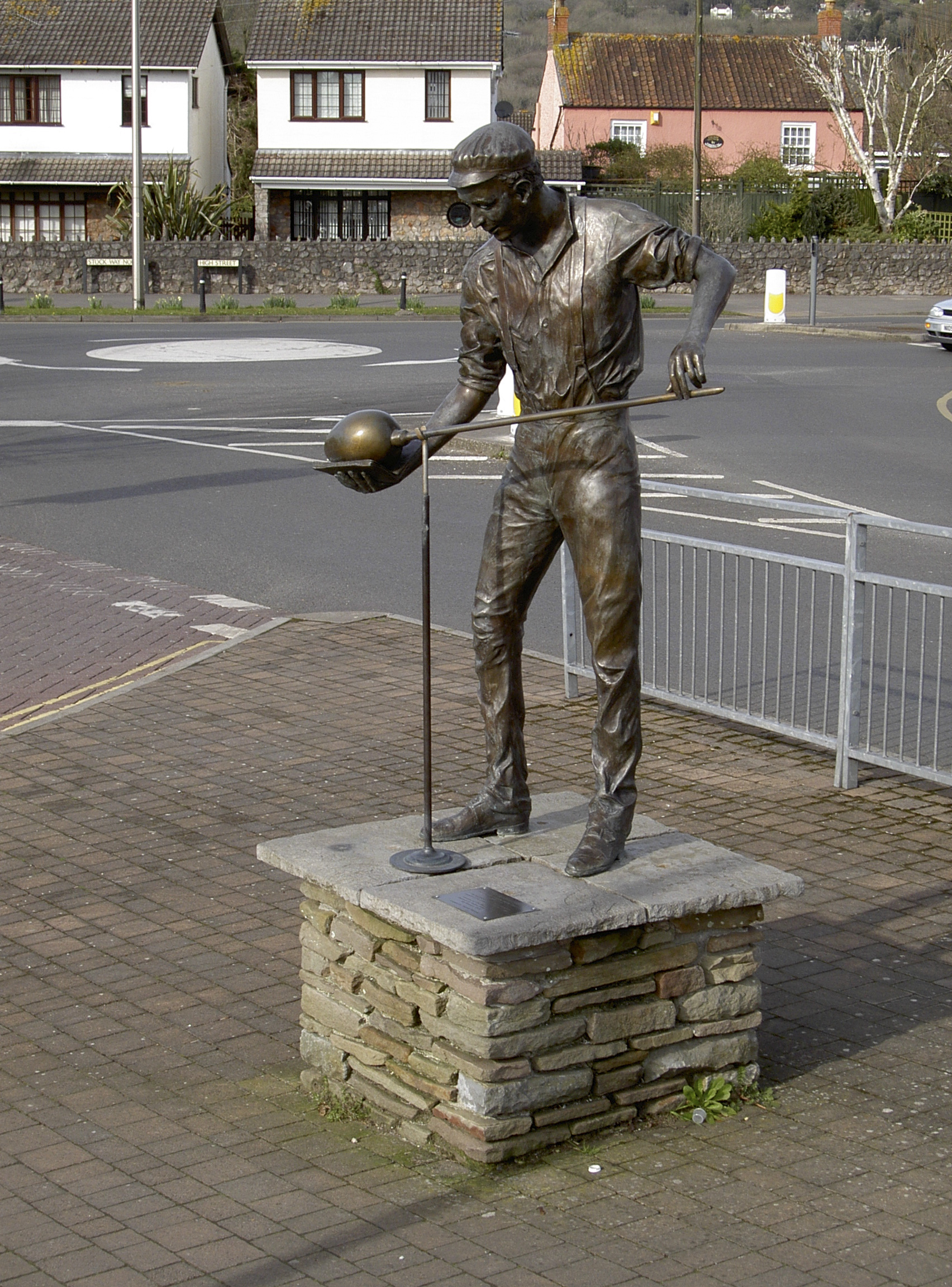
The Glassblower, a sculpture by Vanessa Marston commemorating the Nailsea Glassworks

Nailsea Glassworks was a glass manufacturing factory in Nailsea in the English county of Somerset. The remaining structures have been designated as a scheduled monument.

The factory making bottle glass and some window glass opened in 1788 and closed in 1873. Little remains of the site, however it was excavated and preserved under sand before a supermarket was built opposite.

== History ==
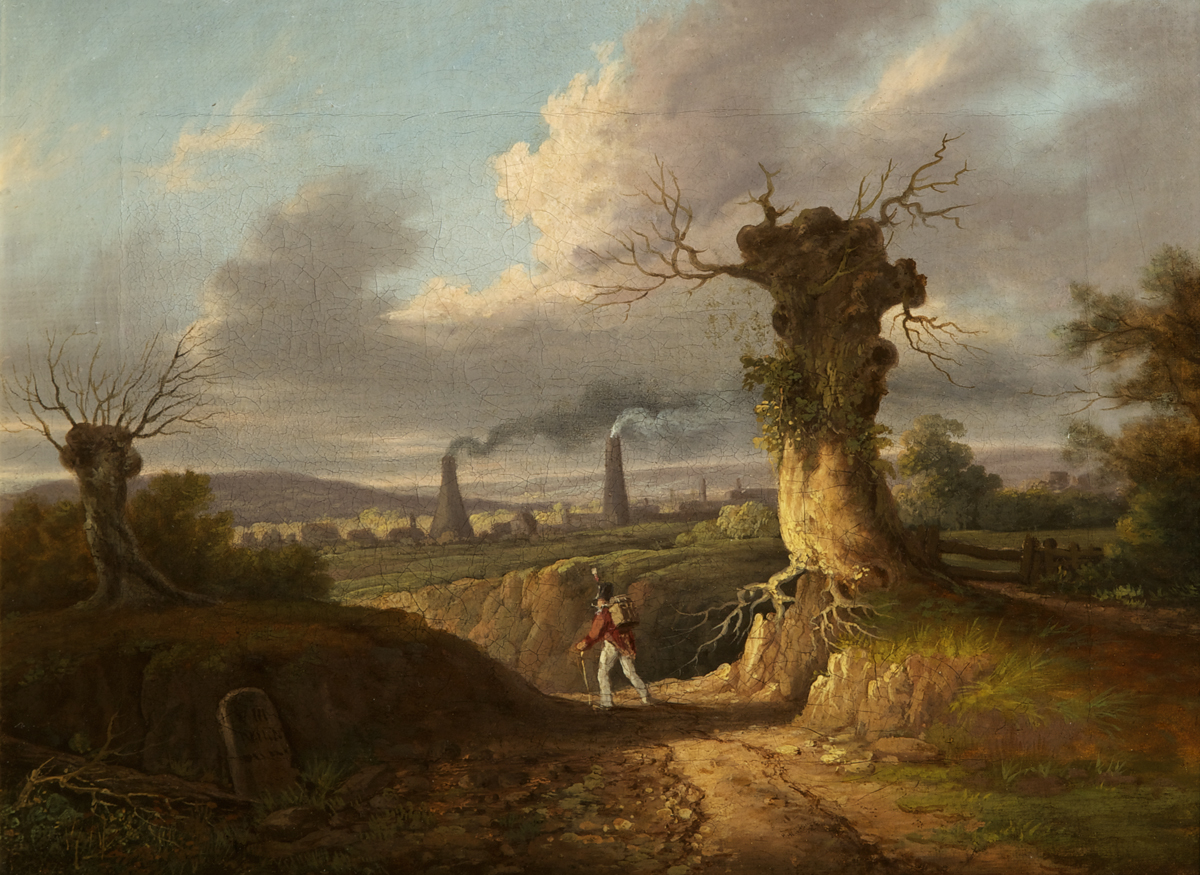
Oil on canvas of The Old Glass Works, Nailsea in about 1810

The glassworks was established by John Robert Lucas, in 1788 because of the plentiful supply of coal for the furnaces, from Elms colliery and other local mines of the Nailsea Basin and outlier of the Bristol Coalfield. The choice of site may also have been influenced by plans for the Grand Western Canal which was planned to include a branch to Nailsea. Lucas had previously had interests in a brewery and glassworks in Bristol and another at Stanton Wick. The company initially traded as "Nailsea Crown Glass and Glass Bottle Manufacturers". Lucas originally built two "cones": one for window glass and the other to make bottle glass.

Some of the raw materials were sourced locally, including local sand (although this was later shipped in from further away) and lime from Walton in Gordano and Wraxall. Saltcake came from Netham Chemical Works in Bristol while kelp and other seaweeds were brought from Ireland and Wales. These were used in general manufacture and in some experimental work on the production of cylinder glass.

John Hartley of Hartley Wood and Co moved to Nailsea in 1812 and began working with Robert Lucas Chance who was the eldest son of William Chance, one of the partners. In the 1820s a new cone was built which survived until 1905, and in the 1840s the"Lily cone" was added for the production of sheet glass.

By 1835 the works became the fourth-largest of its kind in the United Kingdom, mostly producing low-grade bottle glass by Glassblowing. The products were sent all over the UK and some exported to the West Indies and the United States. Lucas's initial partners were William Coathupe and Henry Pater, although this company was dissolved in 1844 becoming Coathupe and Co. but then declined. In 1855 over 100 men and boys were employed. They were affected by a strike in the neighbouring collieries which stopped production.

In 1870 it was brought by Chance Brothers but problems with coal supply led to the final closure. In 1871 the works employed 319 people. The works closed down in 1873, but "Nailsea" glass, an example of the "latticino" decorative style, (mostly made by glass workers at the end of their shift in Nailsea and at other glass works) is still sought after by collectors around the world.

== Site today ==
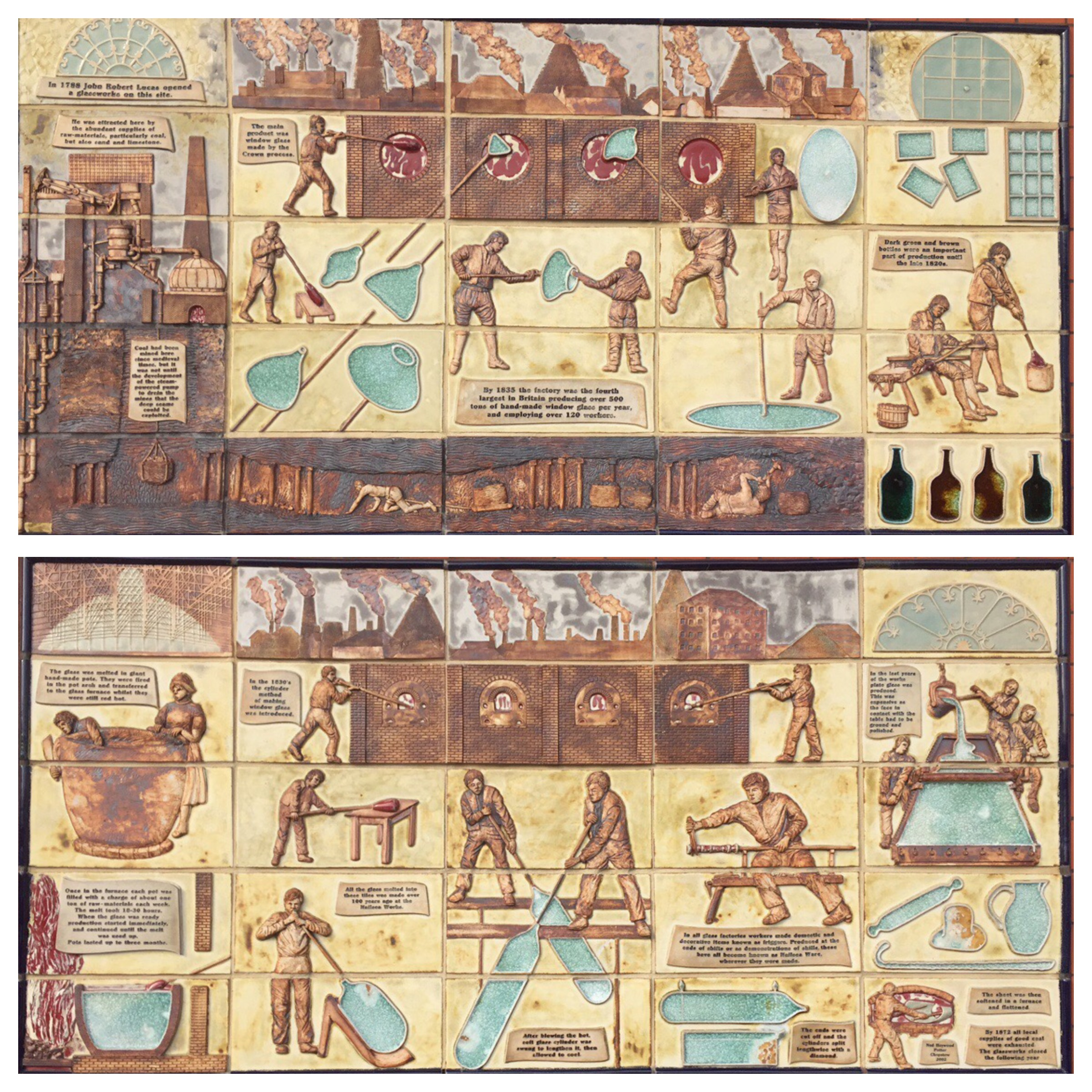
The mosaic commemorating the Glassworks, on the wall of the Tesco supermarket which now sits on the site.

Part of the site of the glass works has been covered by a Tesco supermarket car park, leaving it relatively accessible for future archaeological digs. Archeological exploration was undertaken before the construction of the supermarket. Other parts of the site have been cleared and are being filled with a sand like substance to ensure that the remains of the old glass works are preserved. One surviving building, which housed French kilns and gas-fired furnaces, has been converted into a garage premises.

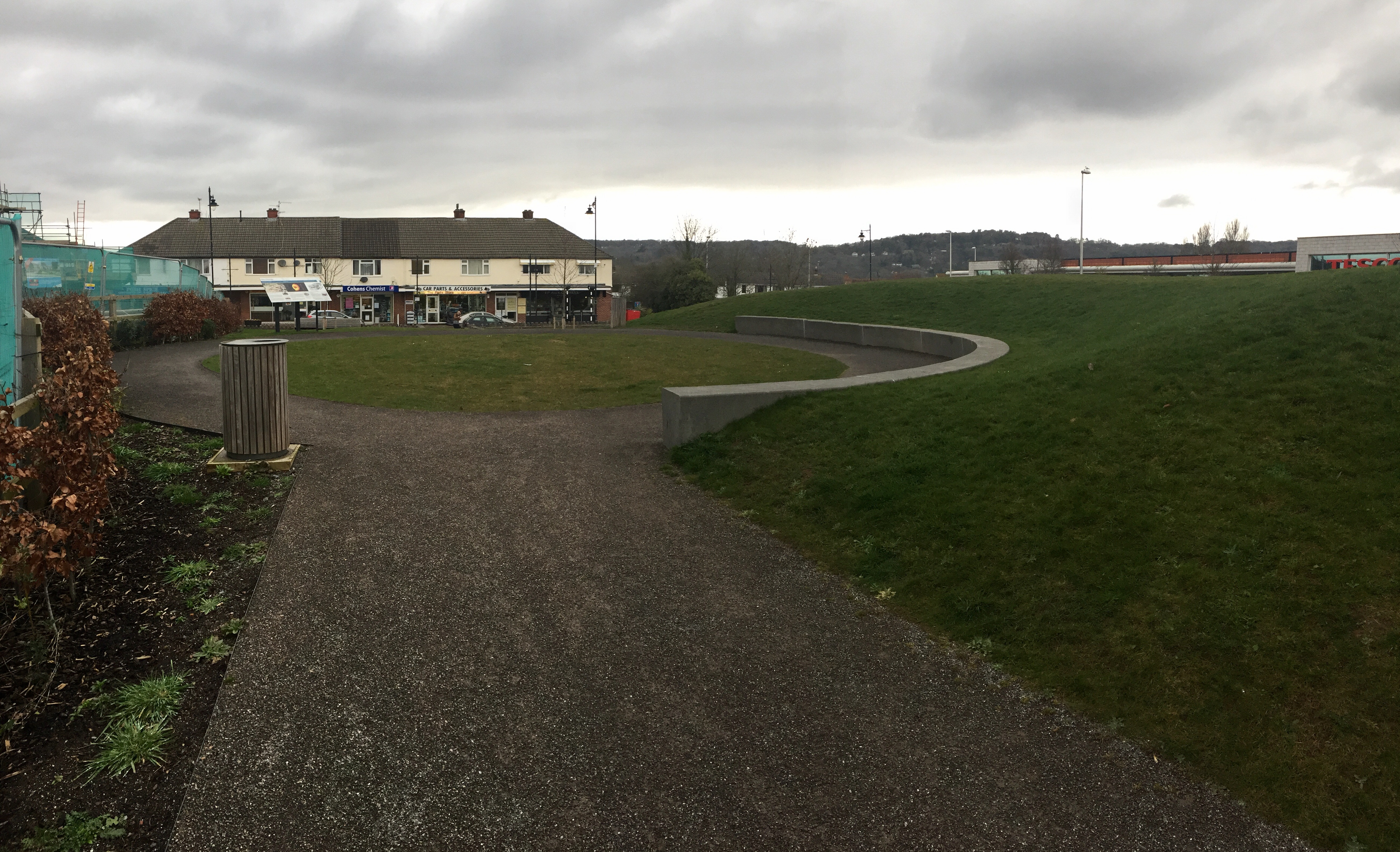
The landscaped green space now sits on the site of the glassworks.

The site was designated as a scheduled monument in 2004. Further preservation work was funded by Nailsea Town Council included planting and landscaping, following the removal of contaminated soil. A green space was eventually built on the site and opened on 30 April 2015 by local business owner John Brown.
