= Lock-on =

Lock-on or Lock On may refer to:

- Radar lock-on, where a radar automatically tracks a selected target
- Lock-on (protest tactic), when one or more protesters locks themselves to an inanimate object

== Video games ==
- Lock-on, a tactic in action video games where the player character targets an enemy, causing all movement to revolve around that enemy
- Lock-On (video game), an arcade, PC, and Atari ST game
- Lock On: Modern Air Combat, a PC flight simulator
- Super Air Diver, an SNES video game called Lock On in North America
- Lock-On Technology, a video game cartridge connection technology, used in Sonic & Knuckles for the Sega Genesis

== Other ==
- Lock On (street art), a genre of street art in which installations are locked to public furniture
- Sega Lock-On, a toy laser-tag game
- Lockon Stratos, a Mobile Suit Gundam 00 character
