= Loggins =

Loggins is a surname. Notable people with the surname include:

- Crosby Loggins, American singer-songwriter
- Dave Loggins, singer, songwriter and musician
- Kenny Loggins, American singer and songwriter
- Leroy Loggins, former professional basketball player

== See also ==
- Loggins and Messina, American rock-pop duo
- Sam Loggin (born 1977), English actress
