= Oval barrow =

Type of barrow

An oval barrow is the name given by archaeologists to a type of prehistoric burial tumulus of roughly oval shape.

Judging from those sited in or near the Thames Valley, there is much doubt as to how oval barrows are related to the burials found within them and funerary practices, because there can be a long gap of many years between an original burial and the construction of the barrow.

== Examples in England ==
=== Buckinghamshire ===
==== Whiteleaf Hill ====
There is a Neolithic oval barrow near the top of Whiteleaf Hill, Monks Risborough, Buckinghamshire (National Grid: SP 822040), which was first excavated by Sir Lindsay Scott between 1934 and 1939 and re-excavated from 2002 to 2006 by Oxford Archaeology (assisted by the Princes Risborough Countryside Group). The mound is roughly oval, but indented on the north-eastern side, making it somewhat kidney-shaped.

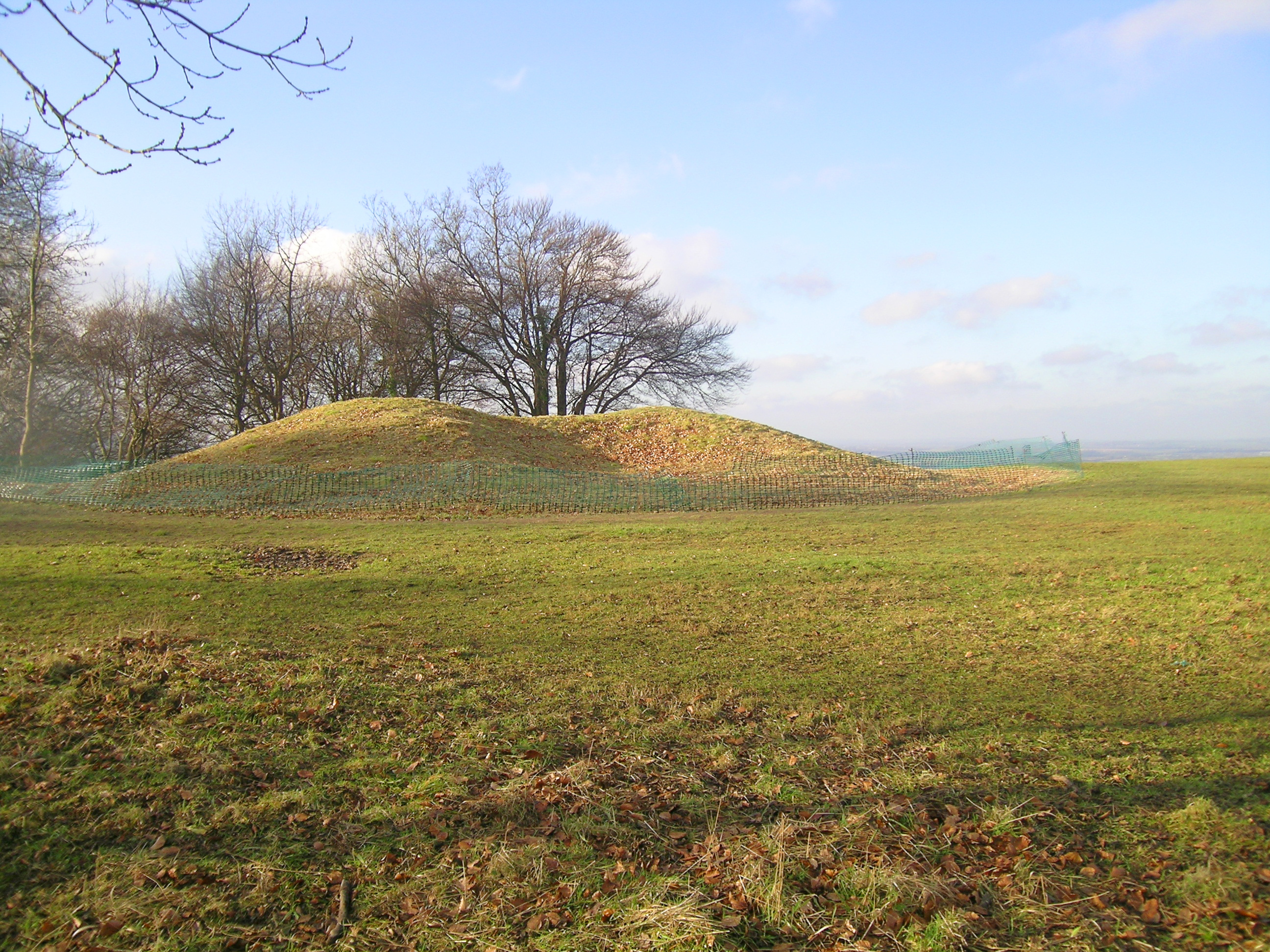
Neolithic Barrow on Whiteleaf Hill, Monks Risborough, Bucks

The barrow held only one burial and radio-carbon dating has shown that the death, the burial and the building of the mound probably all took place within the period 3,750-3,100 B.C., but at different times within that period. The remains appeared to have been placed between two large vertical posts, 1.2 metres apart. Pottery shards and animal bones were found at the core of the mound and the excavators suggest that these came from ceremonial feasting when the mound was built.

==== Dorney Reach ====
This is a mid-Neolithic barrow dated to the approximate period 3300–2800 BC. Previously known only from a cropmark, magnetometry and resistivity surveys have produced more detailed information about this unexcavated site, which is on level ground on the flood plain of the River Thames at SU 9170 7935, 250 metres from the river. They reveal an oval ditch with external dimensions of about 20 by 12.5 metres. The axis lies NNE-SSW. Indications of two pits at the centre may represent a split-timber mortuary structure, as was found at Whiteleaf.

==== Marsh Lane East (site 2) ====
It is believed that this was originally a Neolithic oval barrow, but it was re-cut in the Bronze Age, so that little of the original barrow remains.

=== Oxfordshire ===
Abingdon
