= Castle Batch =

Fortification in Somerset, England

- Somerset, England
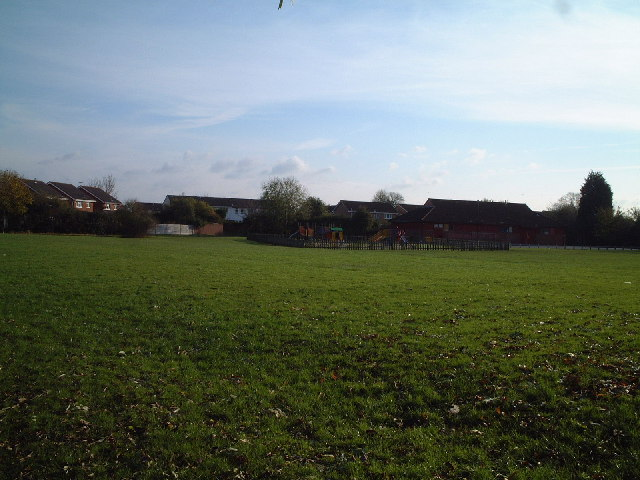
- Site of Castle Batch

Site information
- Type: Motte, possible motte and bailey or ringwork
- Open to the public: Yes
- Condition: Only earthworks remain

Location
- Shown within Somerset
- Coordinates: 51.3688°N 2.9182°W

Castle Batch was a fortification at Worle that once stood overlooking the town of Weston-super-Mare in Somerset, England.

== Details ==
Castle Batch was a motte constructed by the Norman lord Walter of Douai between the Norman conquest of England in 1066 and 1086. It was built on a ridge above the surrounding area, with a mound that is now 3 metres (9.8 ft) high and 42 metres (138 ft) across, surrounded by a ditch up to 10 metres (33 ft) wide. The entrance was probably on the north side of the motte. A possible bailey has been identified alongside the motte. Although typically characterised as a motte, the mound has a slight indentation in the centre and archaeologist Stuart Prior considers the mound to have been a ringwork.

Around 1200 the estate belonged to William De Courtney and by 1303 by John de Beauchamp.

In the 21st century the site forms part of local parkland, and is protected by law as a scheduled monument.

== See also ==
- Castles in Great Britain and Ireland
- List of castles in England
