= Shiplate Slait =

Protected area in Somerset, England

- Site of Special Scientific Interest
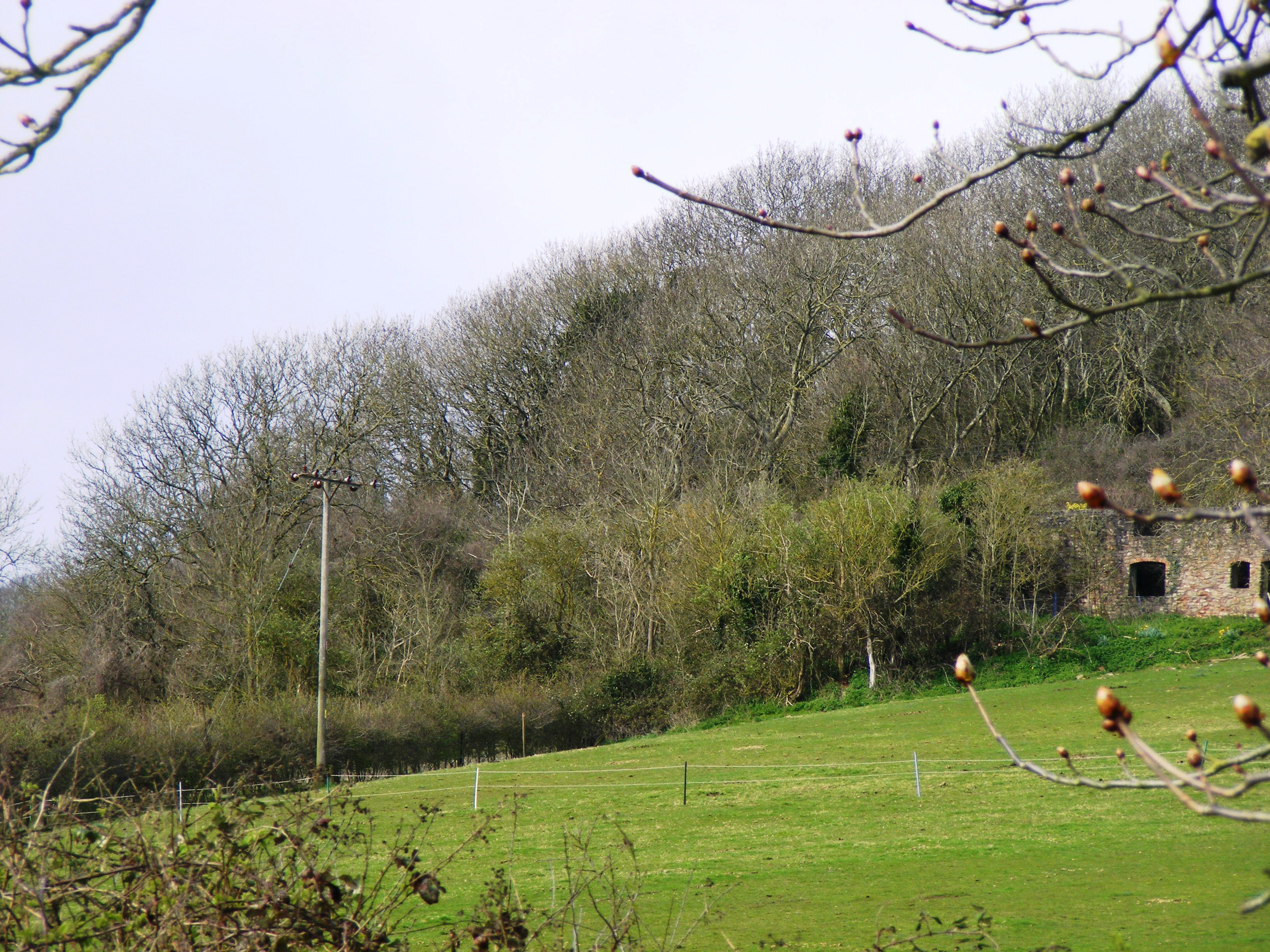

- Location within Somerset
- Location of Shiplate Slait.
- Area of search: Avon
- Grid reference: ST365567
- Coordinates: 51.30586°N 2.91232°W
- Interest: Biological
- Area: 33.9 hectares (0.339 km^{2}; 0.131 sq mi)
- Notification date: 1987

Shiplate Slait (grid reference ST365567) is a 33.9 hectare biological Site of Special Scientific Interest near the village of Loxton, within the Mendip Hills Area of Outstanding Natural Beauty, North Somerset, notified in 1987.

The site is underlain by Clifton Down Limestone, Burrington Oolite, Black Rock Dolomite and Black Rock Limestone of the Carboniferous Limestone Series. There is dolomitic conglomerate (Triassic Mudstone) at the lower edges of the site. The site has unimproved calcicolous grassland, some of which is mixed with dwarf-shrub, mosaics of calcicolous grassland and scrub and woodland. Four nationally rare types of vegetation form most of the grassland. Rare species include Koeleria vallesiana (Somerset hair-grass), Carex humilis (dwarf sedge) and Potentilla tabernaemontani (spring cinquefoil).

A bowl barrow of Neolithic to Bronze Age with a diameter of 24 metres (79 ft) and around 1.2 metres (3 ft 11 in) high, is scheduled as an ancient monument. Two further bowl barrows are also scheduled.
