= Burrington, Somerset =

Village and civil parish in Somerset, England

Coordinates: 51.3303°N 2.7471°W

Burrington
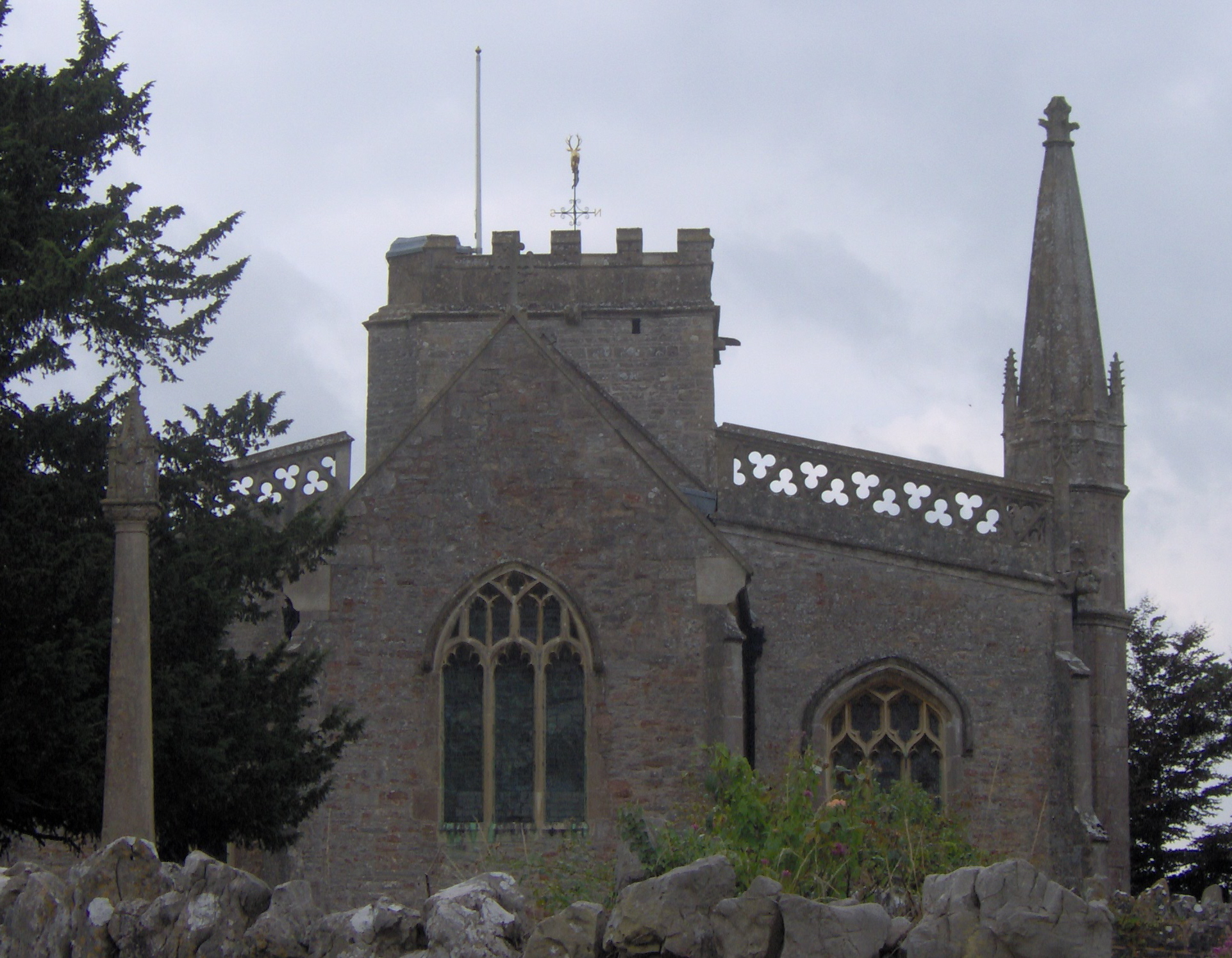
- Burrington Church

- Location within Somerset
- Population: 464 (2011)
- OS grid reference: ST479593
- Unitary authority: North Somerset
- Ceremonial county: Somerset
- Region: South West
- Country: England
- Sovereign state: United Kingdom
- Post town: BRISTOL
- Postcode district: BS40
- Dialling code: 01761
- Police: Avon and Somerset
- Fire: Avon
- Ambulance: South Western
- UK Parliament: Wells and Mendip Hills

Burrington is a small village and civil parish in Somerset, England. It is situated in the unitary authority of North Somerset, just off the A368 between Blagdon and Churchill. 5 miles (8.0 km) north east of Axbridge and about 10 miles (16 km) east of Weston-super-Mare. The parish includes the hamlets of Bourne and Rickford and has a population of 464.

== History ==
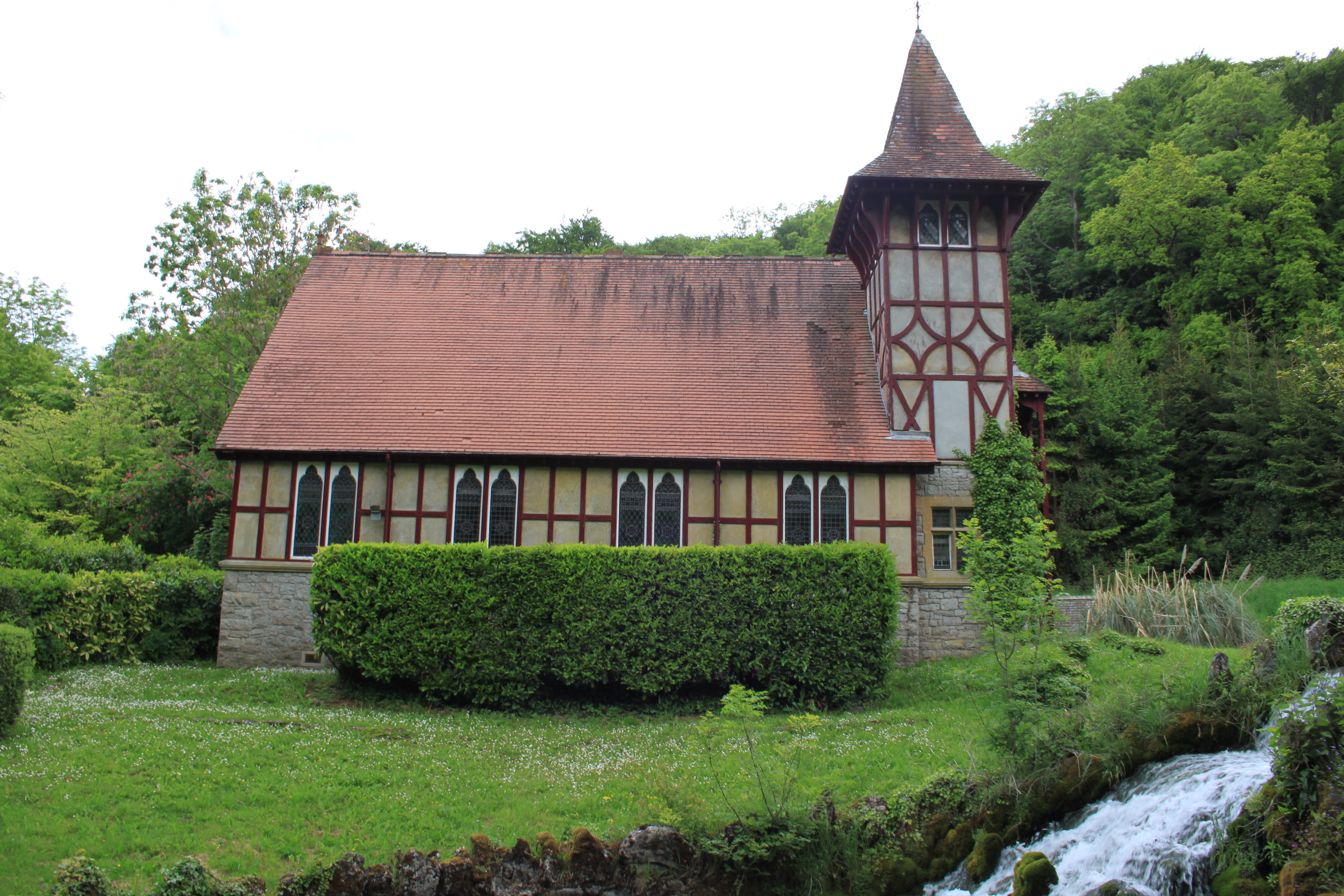
Old Methodist chapel at Rickford. Now a masonic lodge

Burrington is believed to mean 'The villa and an enclosure' from the Old English bur, end and tun.

Burrington was part of the hundred of Brent-cum-Wrington.

In the 15th century the village was called Beryngton and was involved in lead mining.

It is very close to Burrington Combe where there is evidence of occupation since Neolithic times, the Bronze Age and Roman periods. There is also an Iron Age hillfort known as Burrington Camp.

The 19th century Methodist chapel in Rickford is now a masonic lodge. The gauging house over the brook in the village was also built in the late 19th century, and restored in 2013.

== Governance ==
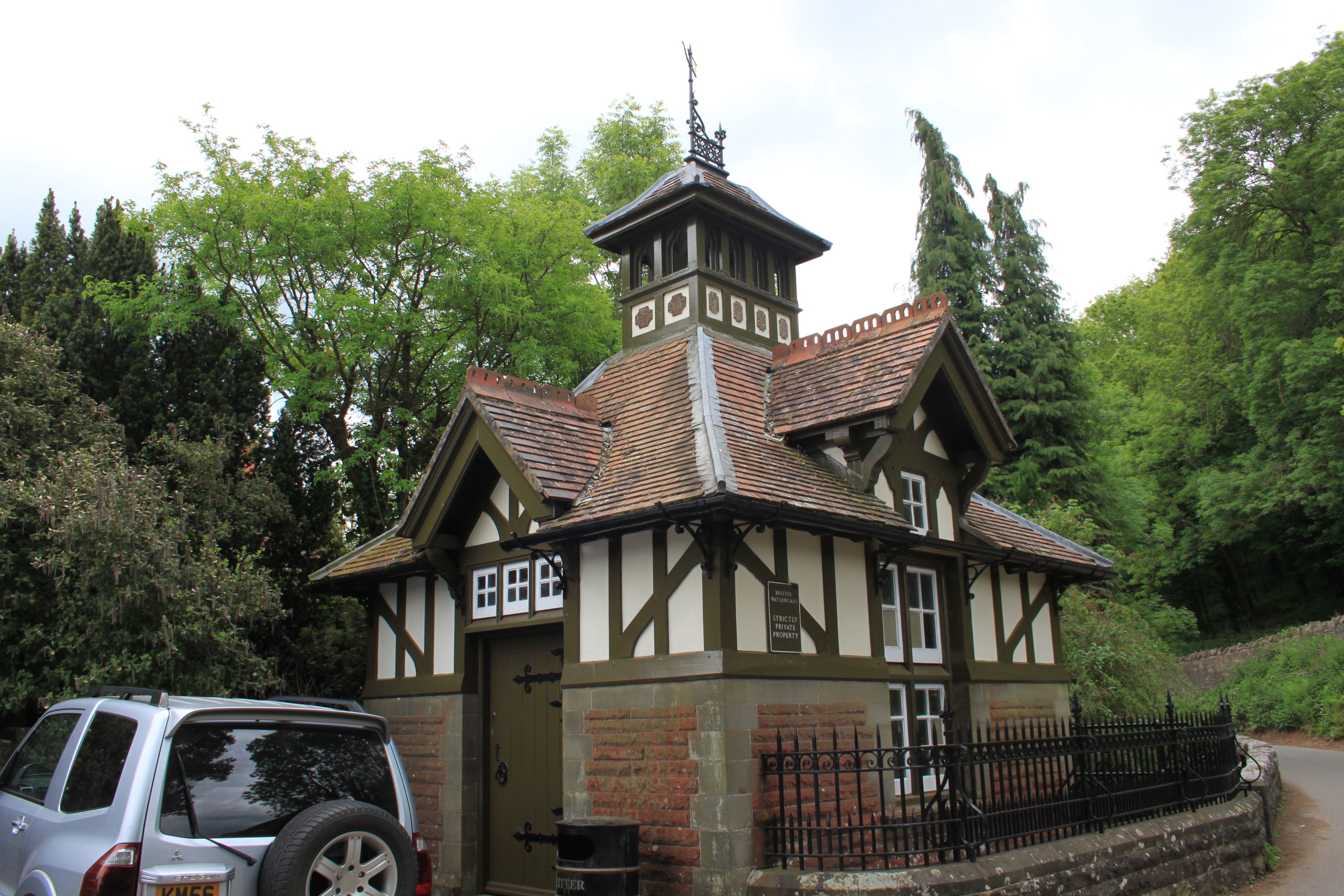
Gauge house on the brook in Rickford

The parish council has responsibility for local issues, including setting an annual precept (local rate) to cover the council's operating cost.

The parish falls within the unitary authority of North Somerset which was created in 1996, as established by the Local Government Act 1992. It provides a single tier of local government with responsibility for almost all local government functions within its area including local planning and building control, local roads, council housing, environmental health, markets and fairs, refuse collection, recycling, cemeteries, crematoria, leisure services, parks, and tourism. It is also responsible for education, social services, libraries, main roads, public transport, trading standards, waste disposal and strategic planning, although fire, police and ambulance services are provided jointly with other authorities through the Avon Fire and Rescue Service, Avon and Somerset Constabulary and the South Western Ambulance Service.

North Somerset's area covers part of the ceremonial county of Somerset but it is administered independently of the non-metropolitan county. Its administrative headquarters is in the town hall in Weston-super-Mare. Between 1 April 1974 and 1 April 1996, it was the Woodspring district of the county of Avon. Before 1974 that the parish was part of the Axbridge Rural District.

The parish is represented in the House of Commons of the Parliament of the United Kingdom as part of the Wells and Mendip Hills constituency. It elects one Member of Parliament (MP) by the first past the post system of election. It was also part of the South West England constituency of the European Parliament prior to Britain leaving the European Union in January 2020, which elected seven MEPs using the d'Hondt method of party-list proportional representation.

== Religious sites ==
The Church of the Holy Trinity is from the 15th century and was restored in 1884. It is a Grade I listed building. It contains a stained-glass window, with the arms of the Capels of Langford Court. The tower contains a bell dating from 1713 and made by Edward Bilbie of the Bilbie family.
