= Elms colliery =

Coal mine in Nailsea, Somerset, England

Elms Colliery
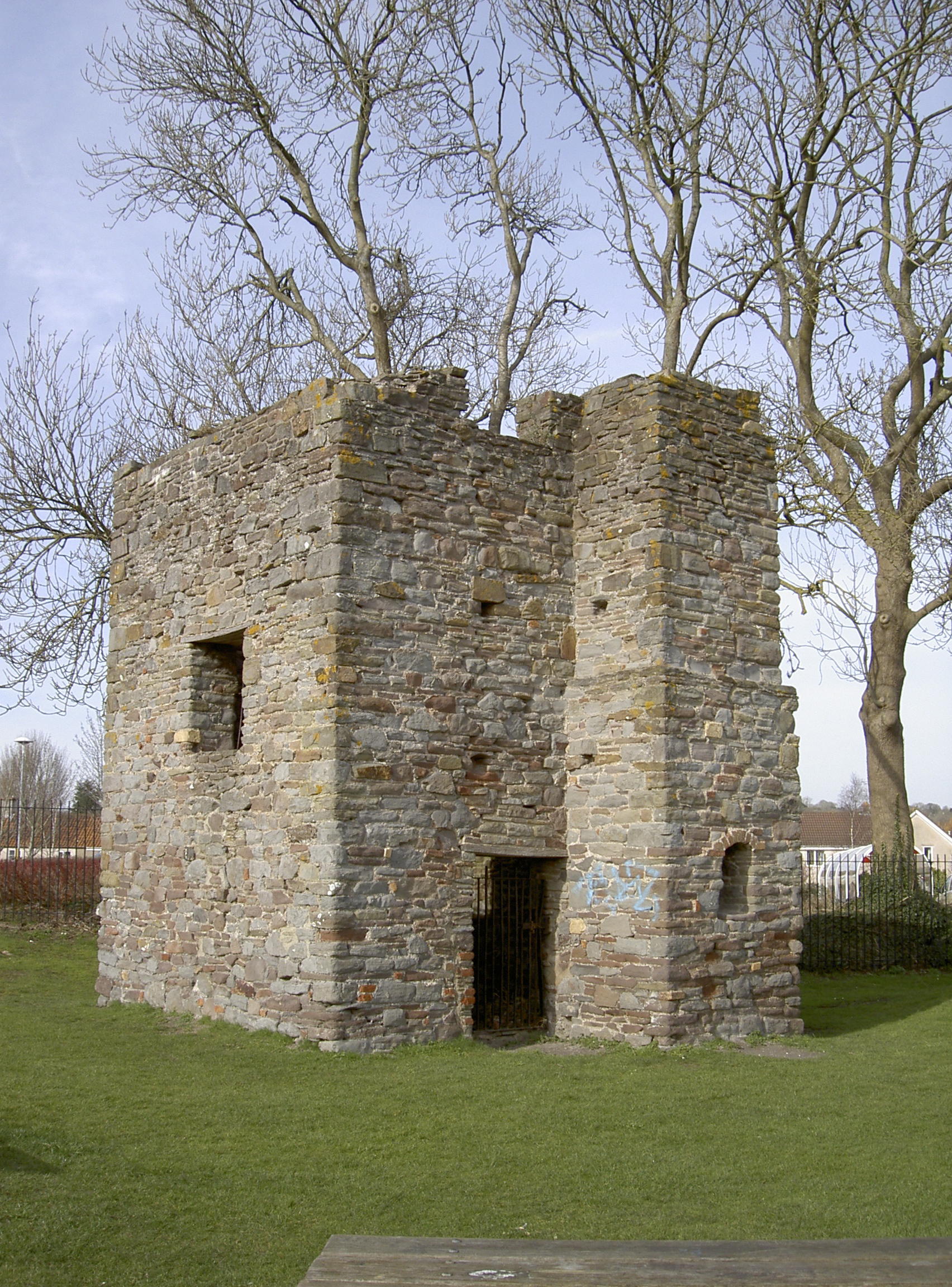
- The old winding tower

- Location within Somerset
- Location: Nailsea, Somerset, England; 51°25′54″N 2°44′47″W
- Products: Coal
- Opened: 1829
- Closed: 1850s

Elms Colliery (also known as Middle Engine Pit) is a disused coal mine in Nailsea within the English County of Somerset. It has been scheduled as an ancient monument and placed on the Heritage at Risk Register due to the risk of vandalism and further decay.

Nailsea's early economy relied on coal mining, which began as early as the 16th century. The earliest recorded date for coal mining in Nailsea was 1507 when coal was being transported to light fires at Yatton. By the late 1700s the Golden Valley area of the town had a large number of pits run by a consortium by Peter Cox, Joseph Whitchurch and Isaac White which was formed in 1786 and known as White and Co. John Robert Lucas joined to obtain coal for the nearby Nailsea Glassworks. Remains of the old pits, most of which had closed down by the late 19th century as mining capital migrated to the richer seams of South Wales, are still visible around the town.

Three buildings survive from the Elms Colliery. The engine house of the rotative beam engine and associated buildings, including the remains of a horse whim and weighbridge house are Grade II listed buildings.

The water tank above the engine house was used to supply water to Elms House after the mine closed.
