= Lockdown (disambiguation) =

A lockdown is an emergency protocol that usually prevents people or information from leaving an area.

Lockdown or Lock Down may also refer to:

== Film and television ==
=== Film ===
- Lockdown (1990 film), an American action film
- Lockdown (2000 film), an American drama film
- Lockdown (2021 Bengali film), an Indian Bengali-language drama film
- Lockdown (2021 Nigerian film), a psychological thriller film
- Lockdown (2022 film), a British-Hong Kong thriller film
- Lockdown (2025 film), an Indian Tamil-language thriller film
- 12 Rounds 3: Lockdown, a 2015 American action film

=== Television ===
==== Series ====
- Lockdown (2006 TV series), an American documentary series on prisons
- Lockdown (South African TV series), a 2018–2019 crime drama series
- Lockdown (2020 TV series), a Canadian-American children's and teen mystery thriller series

==== Episodes ====
- "Lockdown" (The 4400), 2005
- "Lockdown" (Brooklyn Nine-Nine), 2014
- "Lockdown" (ER), 2002
- "Lockdown" (The Flash), 2022
- "Lockdown" (Generator Rex), 2010
- "Lockdown" (Haven), 2011
- "Lockdown" (House), 2010
- "Lockdown" (Lost), 2006
- "Lockdown" (NCIS), 2015
- "Lockdown" (The Rookie), 2021
- "Lockdown" (Smallville), 2006
- "Lockdown" (Stargate SG-1), 2004
- "Lockdown" (Third Watch), 2003
- "Lockdown" (The Walking Dead), 2022
- "Lock Down", an episode of The Jacksons: A Family Dynasty, 2010

== Music ==
- "Lock Down (song)", a 2016 song by Stooshe
- Lock Down, a 2002 album by Krosfyah
- "Lockdown", a 2007 song by Alabama 3
- "Lockdown", a song by Amy Lee from the 2014 soundtrack Aftermath
- "Lockdown", a song by Koffee from the 2022 album Gifted
- "Lock Down", a song by Cypress Hill from the 1993 album Black Sunday
- "Lock Down", a song by Guttermouth from the 1996 album Teri Yakimoto
- "Lock Down", a song by Jayo Felony from the 1995 album Take a Ride
- "Lock Down", a song by Jinjin & Rocky song from the 2022 EP Restore
- "Lock Down", a song by the Inner City Posse from the 1990 EP Bass-ment Cuts

== Other uses ==
- Lockdown (novel), a 2020 novel by Peter May
- "Lockdown" (poem), 2020 poem by Simon Armitage
- Lock-on (protest tactic) or lockdown
- Lockdown (Transformers), a fictional character
- Stay-at-home order or lockdown, a mass quarantine order
  - COVID-19 lockdowns, a specific example
- TNA Lockdown, a TV wrestling event
- Tom Clancy's Rainbow Six: Lockdown, a 2005 video game
