= Aveline's Hole =

Cave and archaeological site in the United Kingdom

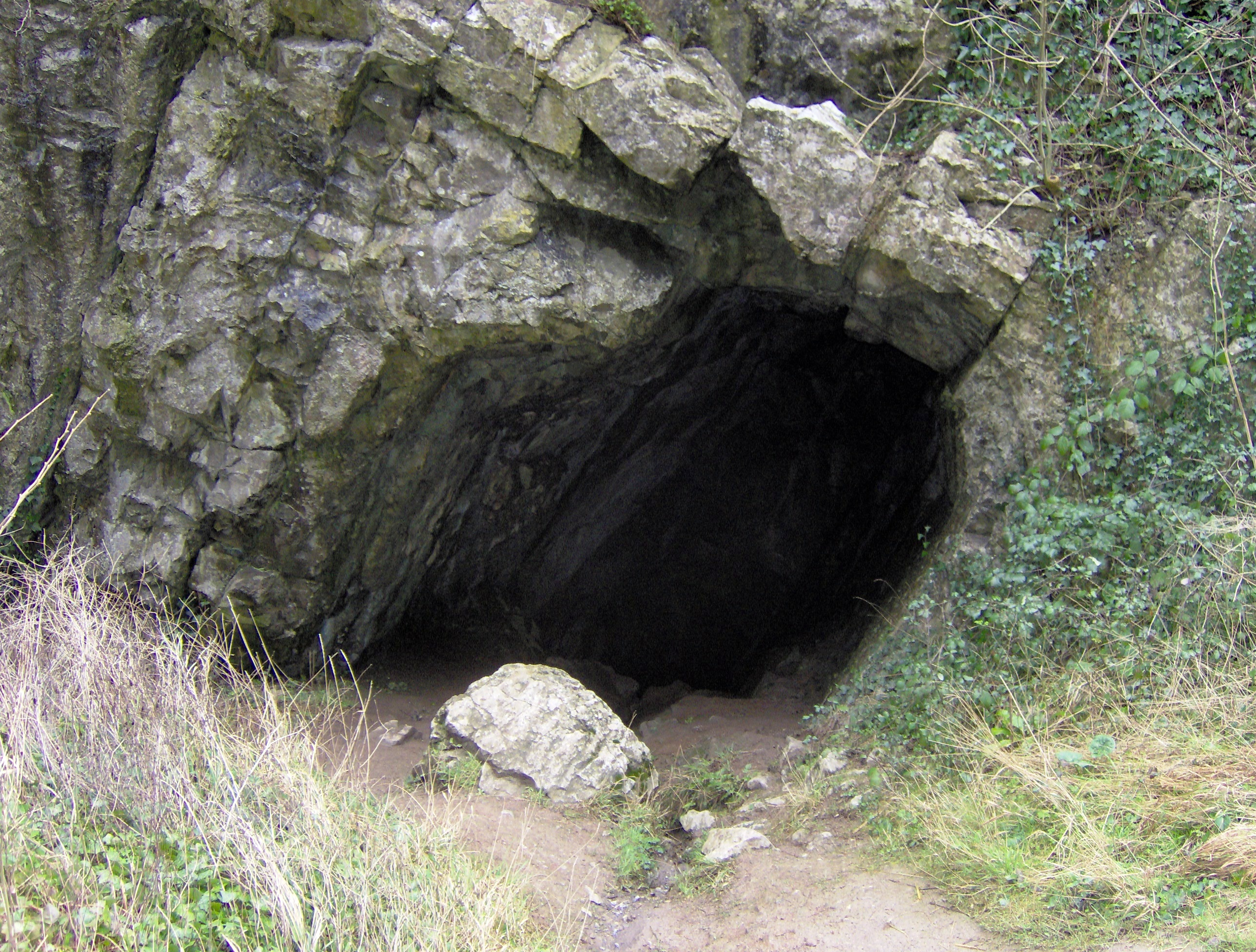
- Aveline's Hole
- Interactive map of Aveline's Hole
- Location: Mendip Hills, Somerset, England
- Coordinates: 51°19′29″N 2°45′12″W
- Depth: 16 m (52 ft)
- Length: 68 m (223 ft)
- Elevation: 99 m (325 ft)
- Discovery: 1797
- Geology: Limestone
- Cave survey: Mendip Cave Registry & Archive (1968)

Aveline's Hole is a cave at Burrington Combe in the limestone of the Mendip Hills, in Somerset, England.

The earliest scientifically dated cemetery in Britain, 10,200 and 10,400 years old, was found at Aveline's Hole, constituting the largest assemblage of Mesolithic human remains found in Britain. Much of the collection has been lost due to pillaging, poorly recorded investigation and war, and although more than fifty individuals are represented, there are only two complete skeletons. Perforated animal teeth, red ochre and seven pieces of fossil ammonite, suggest that some of the bodies were adorned.

The cave was rediscovered in 1797 by two men digging for a rabbit. The cave was excavated and the entrance enlarged in 1860 by William Boyd Dawkins who named it after his mentor William Talbot Aveline.

Access to the cave is controlled by the University of Bristol Spelæological Society and is restricted during the bat hibernation season.

== See also ==
- Caves of the Mendip Hills
- Mortuary cave
