= Locking Castle =

Castle in the United Kingdom

- Locking, Somerset, England
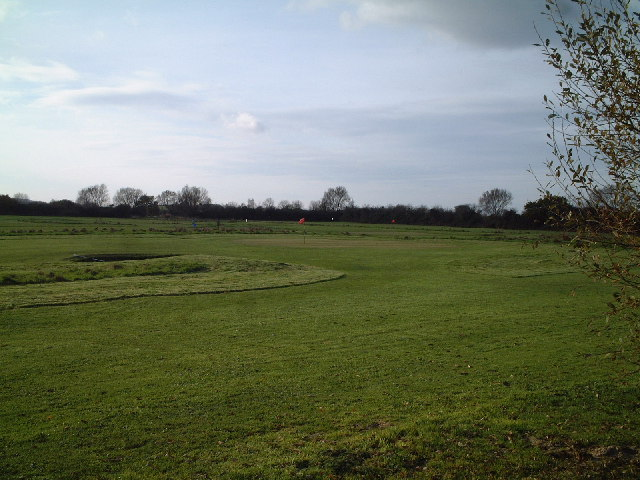
- The site which is now a golf course

Site information
- Type: Motte and bailey

Location
- Shown within Somerset
- Coordinates: 51.3434°N 2.9147°W

Locking Castle was a castle that once stood on Carberry Hill near the site of RAF Locking in Locking in the North Somerset district of Somerset, England. It has been scheduled as an ancient monument.

It was a motte and bailey on Carberry Hill. Excavations in 1902 identified the remains of a small stone chamber surrounded by a ditch. Fragments of pottery and the remains of a sword were also found. A coin from the period of Edward IV was also uncovered.

Around the site of the castle is a 60 metres (200 ft) long bank which is around 1.5 metres (4 ft 11 in) high and a ditch. An area west of the inner bailey has been identified as a possible pillow mound.

The origin of the castle is unclear. It may have been part of the manor of Kewstoke or alternatively Hutton. The two manors were combined and given by Henry I to Geoffrey de Dun. In 1214 Locking was given to Woodspring Priory and would have ceased to have military significance.

== See also ==
- Castles in Great Britain and Ireland
- List of castles in England
