= Richard Whiting (abbot) =

English Roman Catholic abbot and martyr

Blessed Richard Whiting O.S.B.
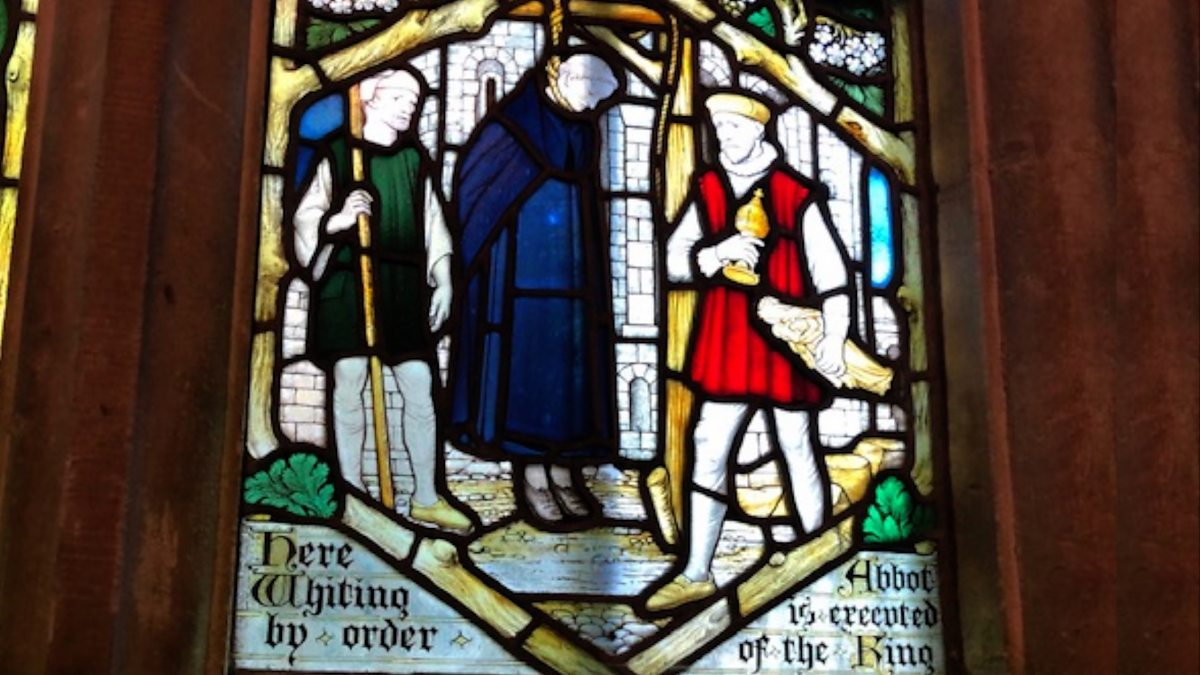
- A stained glass window in Sacred Heart Church in Minehead, Somerset

Abbot of Glastonbury, Martyr
- Born: c. 1461; Wrington, North Somerset, England
- Died: 15 November 1539 (aged 77 - 78); Glastonbury Tor, Glastonbury, England
- Honored in: Roman Catholic Church
- Beatified: 13 May 1895 by Pope Leo XIII
- Feast: 15 November
- Attributes: Noose in neck, holding a miniature St. Michael's Church tower from Glastonbury Tor, martyr's palm, pastoral staff
- Patronage: Glastonbury

Richard Whiting O.S.B (1461 – 15 November 1539) was an English monk and the last abbot of Glastonbury.

Whiting presided over Glastonbury Abbey at the time of the Dissolution of the Monasteries (1536–1541) under King Henry VIII of England. The king had him hanged, drawn and quartered after his conviction for treason for remaining loyal to Rome. He is considered a martyr by the Catholic Church, which beatified him on 13 May 1895.

== Early life ==
Richard Whiting was born near Wrington. He was educated at Glastonbury Abbey, and then at the Monk's Hostel at Cambridge, graduating with an MA in 1483.

== Career ==
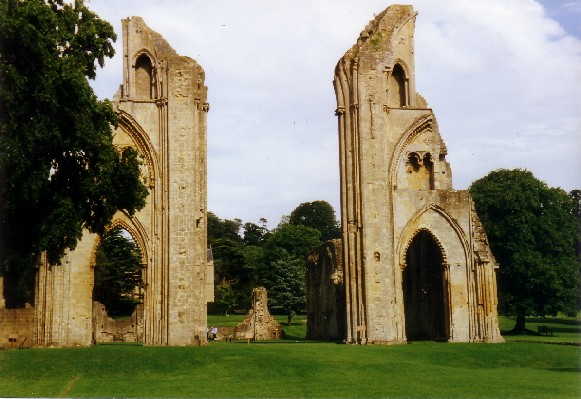
View of Glastonbury Abbey from the former location of the North transept in East direction to the choir.

Whiting was ordained deacon in 1500 and priest in 1501. He returned to Cambridge in 1505 to take his doctor's degree. He served as camerarius at Glastonbury in charge of managing the dormitory, lavatory, and wardrobe of the community.

After the death of the Abbot of Glastonbury, Richard Beere, in February 1525, the community elected his successor per formam compromissi, which elevates the selection to a higher ranking personage – in this case Cardinal Thomas Wolsey. Wolsey obtained King Henry's permission to act and chose Richard Whiting. The first ten years of Whiting's rule were prosperous and peaceful. He was a sober and caring spiritual leader and a good manager of the abbey's day-to-day life. Contemporary accounts show that Whiting was held in very high esteem.

The abbey over which Whiting presided was one of the richest and most influential in England. About one hundred monks lived in the enclosed monastery, where the sons of the nobility and gentry were educated before going on to university. As Abbot of Glastonbury, Whiting was a peer of the realm and administrator of vast estates.

Whiting signed his assent to the Act of Supremacy when it was first presented to him and his monks in 1534. Henry sent Richard Layton to examine Whiting and the other inhabitants of the abbey. He found all in good order, but suspended the abbot's jurisdiction over the town of Glastonbury. Small "injunctions" were given to him about the management of the abbey property. A number of times over the years which followed, Whiting was told the abbey was safe from dissolution. However, the 1535 Suppression of Religious Houses Act brought about the dissolution of the lesser monasteries and provided a warning of what the future might hold.

== Death ==
By January 1539, Glastonbury was the only monastery left in Somerset. Abbot Whiting refused to surrender the abbey, which did not fall under the Act for the suppression of the lesser houses. On 19 September of that year the royal commissioners, Layton, Richard Pollard and Thomas Moyle, arrived there without warning on the orders of Thomas Cromwell, presumably to find faults and thus facilitate the abbey's closure. The commissioners had expected to find considerable treasure at Glastonbury and finding comparatively little, they proceeded to a more thorough search, finding money and plate walled up in secure vaults. There was also a rumour that other items had been relocated to other estates and manors belonging to the Abbey.

Whiting, by now feeble and advanced in years, was sent to the Tower of London to be examined by Cromwell himself. The precise charge on which he was arrested, and subsequently executed, remains uncertain, though his case is usually referred to as one of treason. Cromwell clearly acted as judge and jury: in his manuscript Remembrances are the entries:

Item, Certayn persons to be sent to the Tower for the further examenacyon of the Abbot, of Glaston... Item. The Abbot, of Glaston to (be) tryed at Glaston and also executyd there with his complycys... Item. Councillors to give evidence against the Abbot of Glaston, Rich. Pollard, Lewis Forstew (Forstell), Thos. Moyle.

Marillac, the French Ambassador, on 25 October wrote: "The Abbot of Glastonbury. . . has lately, been put in the Tower, because, in taking the Abbey treasures, valued at 200,000 crowns, they found a written book of arguments in behalf of Queen Katherine."

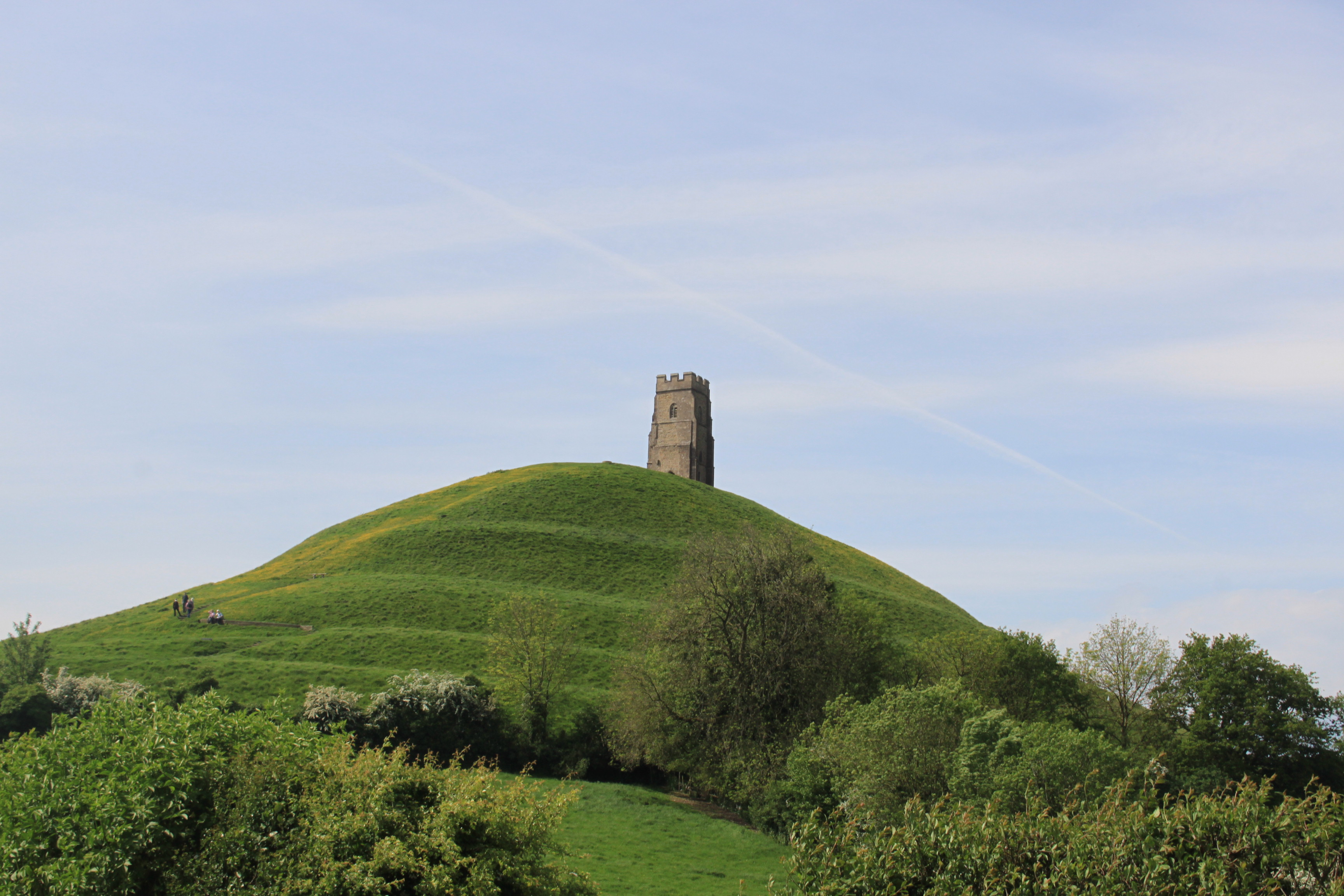
Glastonbury Tor the site of the martyrdoms of Abbot Whiting and Doms John Thorn and Roger James

As a member of the House of Lords, Whiting should have been attainted (condemned) by an Act of Parliament passed for that purpose, but his execution was an accomplished fact before Parliament met. Whiting was sent back to Glastonbury with Pollard, and reached Wells on 14 November. A trial apparently took place, and he was convicted of "robbing Glastonbury church". The next day, Saturday, 15 November, he was taken to Glastonbury with two of his monks, treasurer of the church John Thorne and sacristan Roger James, where all three were fastened upon hurdles and dragged by horses to the top of Glastonbury Tor which overlooks the town. Here they were hanged, drawn and quartered, with Whiting's head being fastened over the west gate of the now deserted abbey and his limbs exposed at Wells, Bath, Ilchester and Bridgwater.

Blesseds John Thorne and Roger James O.S.B.
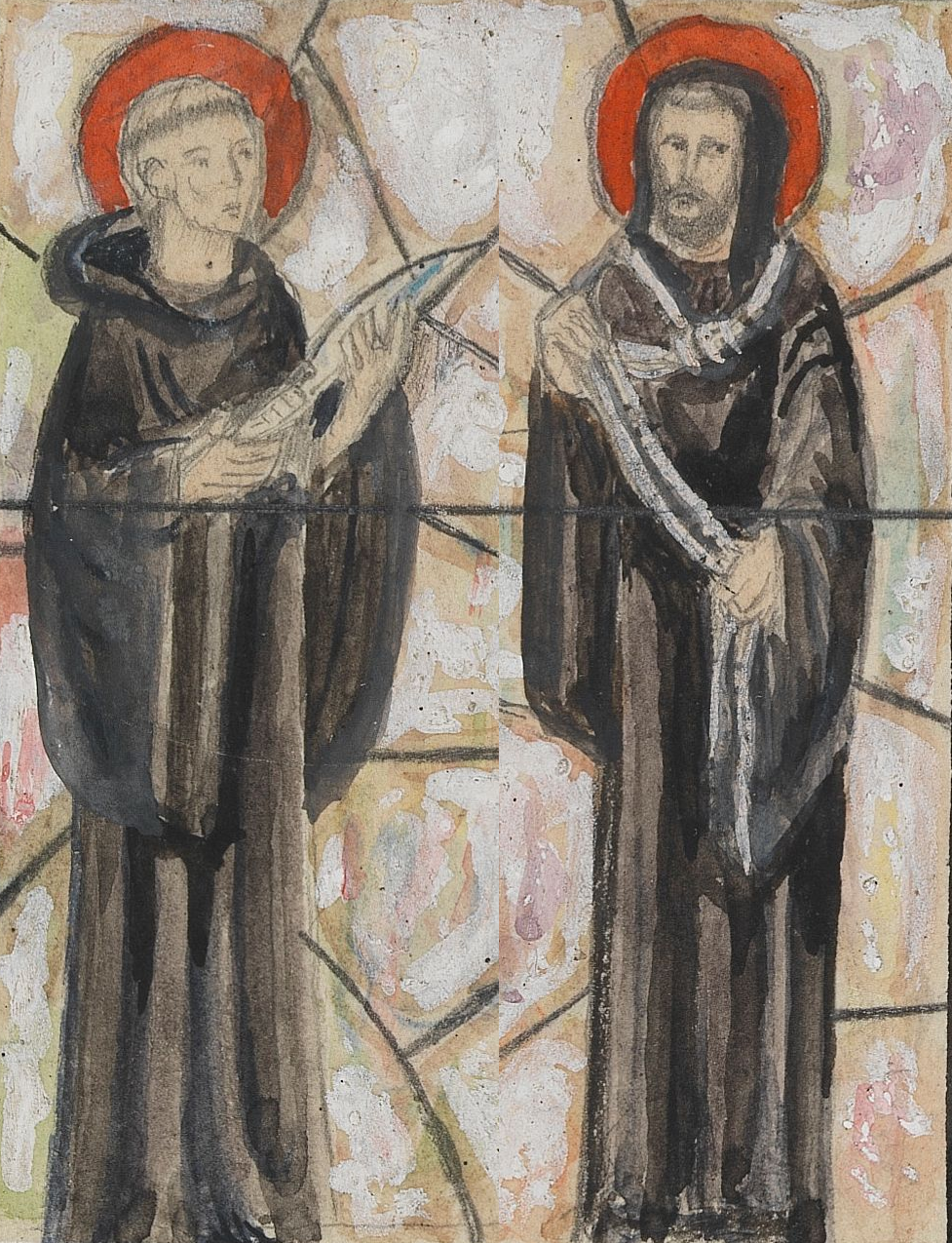
- Details of a sketch of a stained glass window for Corpus Christi Church in Weston-super-Mare, England

Benedictine Monks, Martyrs
- Died: 15 November 1539; Glastonbury Tor, Glastonbury, England
- Beatified: 13 May 1895 by Pope Leo XIII
- Feast: 15 November
- Attributes: Thorne: knife, holding a noose, arrow, book, martyr's palm James: noose in neck
- Patronage: Glastonbury

== Legacy ==
Whiting was beatified by the Pope Leo XIII on 13 May 1895.

Whiting was the subject of a novel, The Last Abbot of Glastonbury (1883), by Augustine David Crake.

In 2023, a pastoral area of the Roman Catholic Diocese of Clifton was named in honour of Whiting.

== See also ==
- Hugh Faringdon, last Abbot of Reading Abbey
- Thomas Marshall, last Abbot of St John's Abbey, Colchester
- Carthusian Martyrs
