= Scarth =

Scarth may refer to:

== People ==
- Alice Scarth - writer
- Harry Mengden Scarth (1814 – 1890), English clergyman and antiquarian
- W. B. Scarth - (May 24, 1895 – March 9, 1983) Canadian businessman
- William Bain Scarth - (1837 - 1902) Canadian politician
- James Scarth Gale - translated bibles
- Jimmy Scarth (26 August 1926 – 12 December 2000) footballer
- Vera Scarth-Johnson, (1912 - 1999), botanist

== Places ==
=== Canada ===
- Scarth, Manitoba

== Other ==
- Scarth A.D. 2195 - Comic Strip
