= Harry Mengden Scarth =

English cleric and antiquarian (1814–1890)

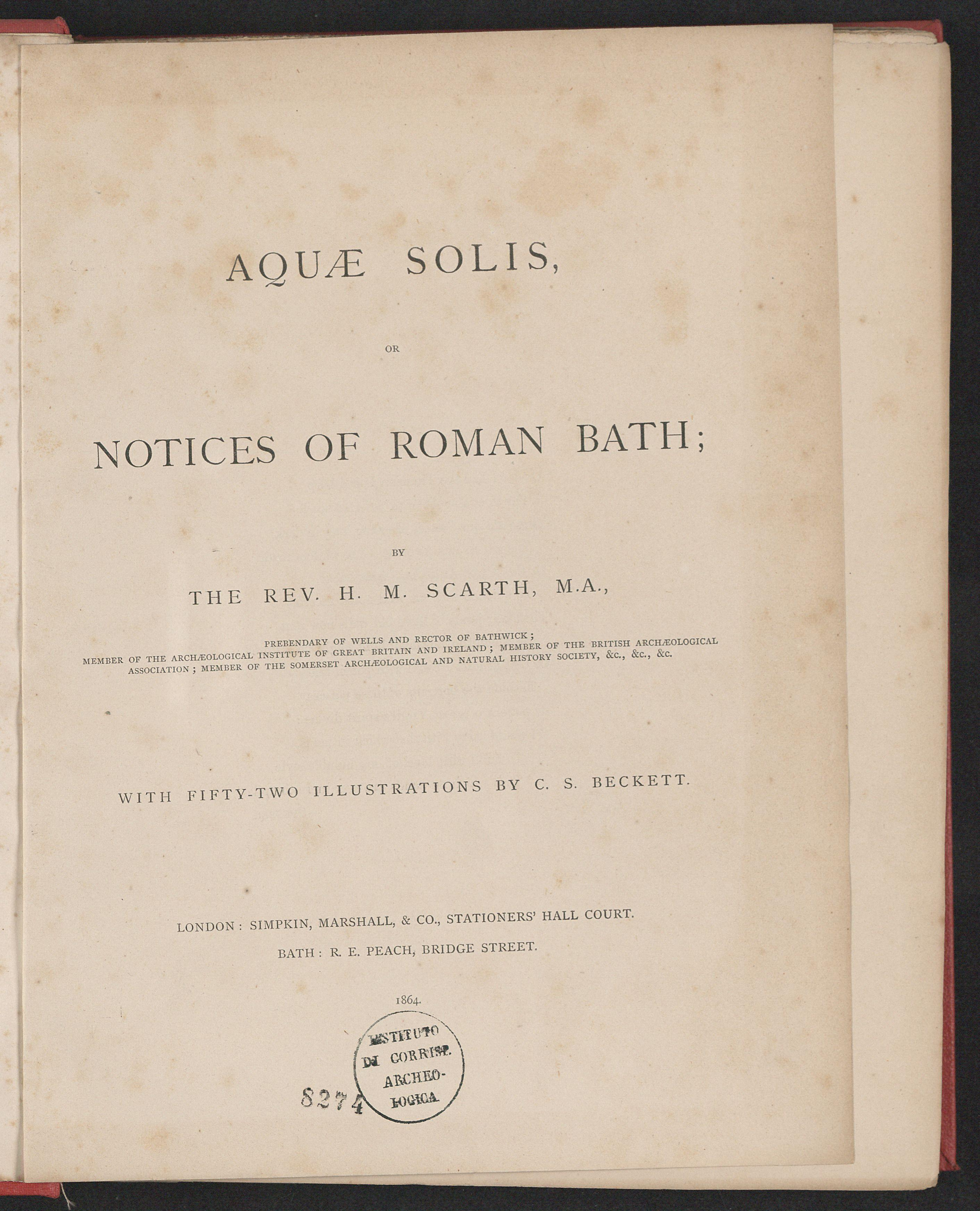
- Aquae Solis
- Born: 11 May 1814; Staindrop, Durham
- Died: 5 April 1890 (aged 75); Tangier

Harry Mengden Scarth (11 May 1814 – 5 April 1890) was a British clergyman, antiquary and an expert on the Romans in Britain.

== Life ==
Scarth was born in Staindrop, Durham in 1814.

In 1868 he published Aquae Solis. He became the rector of the Church of All Saints in Wrington in 1871.

Scarth died in Tangier and was buried in Wrington.

== Family ==
In 1842 Scarth married Elizabeth Sally Hamilton, daughter of John Leveson Hamilton (d. 1825), rector of Ellesborough. They had a daughter, Alice Mary Elizabeth Scarth, born on Christmas Eve, 1848 in Bath. She published The story of the old Catholic and other kindred movements leading up to a union of national independent churches in 1883.
