= 1275 British earthquake =

Strong medieval seismic event

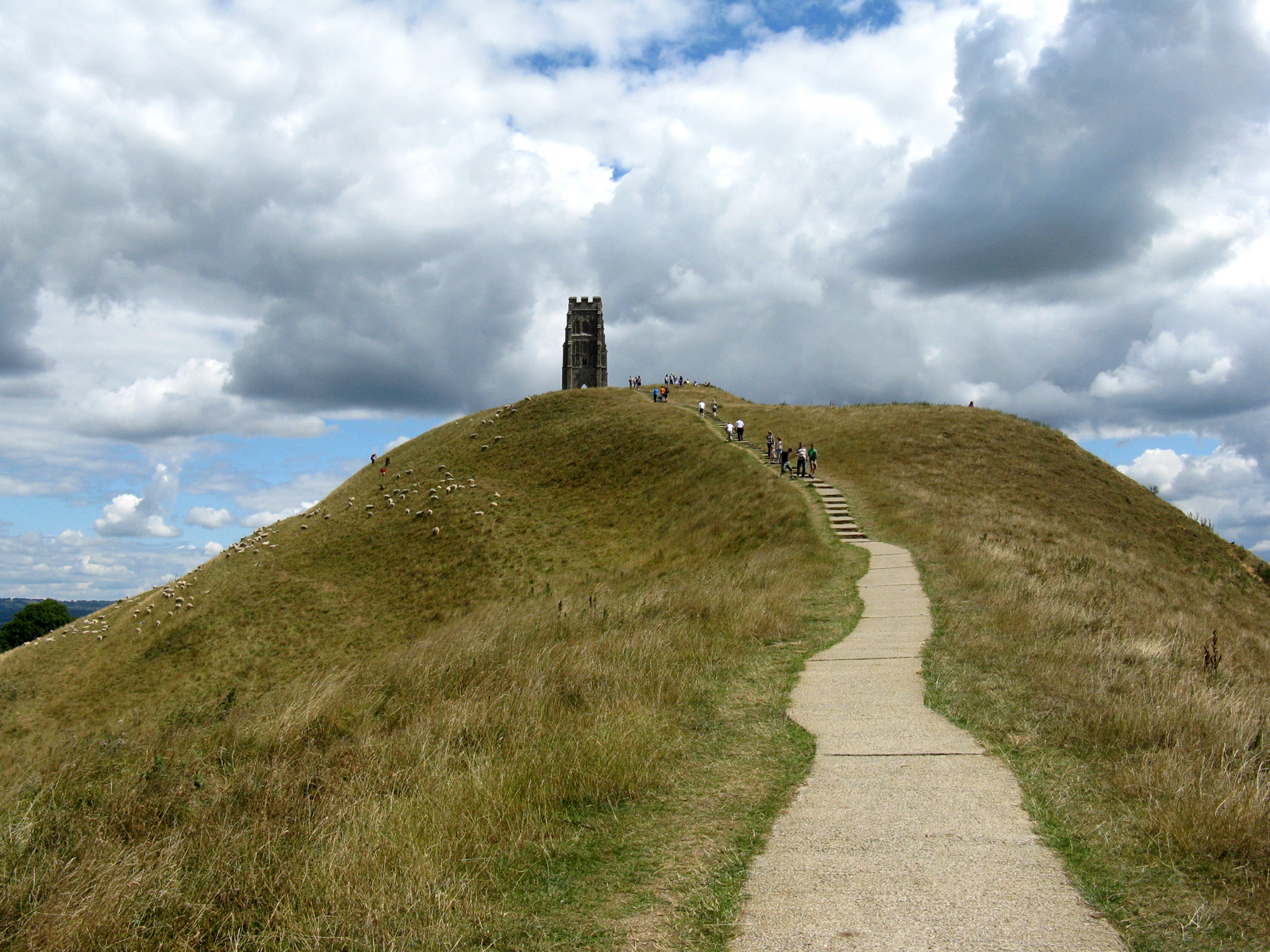
- Glastonbury Tor (pictured in 2010) showing the tower of the rebuilt St Michael's Church (C14)
- Local date: 11 September 1275
- Local time: Morning
- Magnitude: 6 M_{w} (hypothesised)
- Areas affected: London, Canterbury, Winchester, Glamorgan
- Max. intensity: MSK-64 VII (Very strong); EMS-98 VIII (Heavily damaging)
- Foreshocks: None reported
- Aftershocks: None reported
- Casualties: Multiple fatalities

On 11 September 1275, an earthquake struck the south of Great Britain. The epicentre is unknown, although it may have been in the Portsmouth/Chichester area on the south coast of England or in Glamorgan, Wales. The earthquake is known for causing the destruction of St Michael's Church on Glastonbury Tor in Somerset.

== Earthquake ==
The annals of Waverley in Surrey report that the earthquake occurred "between the first hour of the day and the third" on 11 September 1275. It was felt in London, Canterbury, Winchester and Wales, and may have been felt across the rest of England. One account described how it was felt "chiefly in the west". Neither foreshocks nor aftershocks are reported as having occurred.

The earthquake caused the destruction of the 11th-century timber Church of St Michael atop Glastonbury Tor. It is likely that other buildings across the country were destroyed, and the annals of Osney reported that people were killed in the earthquake—"domus et ecclesiae in diversis locis Angliae subvertebantur et homines interficiebantur" ("homes and churches in different areas of England [were] overthrow[n]; the people being killed"). The annals of Winchester state that the tremors were felt across the sea, which may imply it was felt in France, although the lack of corroboration from French sources may suggest this is a confusion with a different event. One account described how "a great earthquake happened in many kingdoms, and chiefly in England, and floods of water also about maritime towns". Similarly, Walter de Hemingburgh observed that "there was a general earthquake in London and in the kingdom of England, both in camps and towns, habitations and fields". It is possible that the coastal effects of the earthquake are better attributed to unrelated inclement weather, as the word "earthquake" may have archaically referred to thunder.

The British Geological Survey hypothesises that the extent and spread of damage suggests an intensity of at least 7 on the Medvedev–Sponheuer–Karnik scale ("very strong"), or 8 on the European macroseismic scale ("heavily damaging").

=== Epicentre ===
The epicentre of the earthquake is unknown. Despite contemporary reports that assume the damage at Glastonbury Tor prove a Somerset epicentre, it is unlikely that the epicentre was in the county, and the destruction of the church is more likely attributed to the church's exposed position atop a steep and narrow hill. A possible location is in the area of Portsmouth and Chichester. This area is notable for frequency of earthquakes due to the presence of a deep north–south strike-slip fault. This hypothesis is strengthened by the report of Thomas Wykes, who wrote that the shock was more intense on the south coast.

A possible alternative epicentre is in South Wales. Edward Gamage, the rector in St Athan, Glamorgan, described an earthquake causing immense damage to Glamorgan and Somerset. Gamage, an antiquarian in the 18th century, wrote a history of the Strandling family of Bristol where he described the earthquake as occurring in the time of Sir John Strandling, which is probably the same as the 1275 event. This suggests an epicentre closer to Swansea and implies a magnitude of 6 M_{w}.

Some sources cite the earthquake as being a Cornish or French event, mistaking a reference to the destruction at "St Michael on the Mount" (the church on Glastonbury Tor) for occurring at St Michael's Mount or Mont-Saint-Michel. The annals of Waverley refer to an earthquake affecting the whole country and destroying the church called "St Michael of [the] Mount", although no specific mention of the location of the church is made.
