= Howard A. Bell =

British sportsman

Dr Howard Alexander Bell
- Born: 21 February 1888; Bletchingley, Surrey, England
- Died: 2 December 1974 (aged 86)
- Resting place: All Saints' Church, Wrington, Somerset
- Education: Cambridge University
- Occupation: General Practitioner
- Spouse: Sophia Mary 'Millie' Bell (née Cross)
- Children: none
- Relatives: William Alexander Bell (father), Adeline Eliza Bell (née Tooth) (mother)

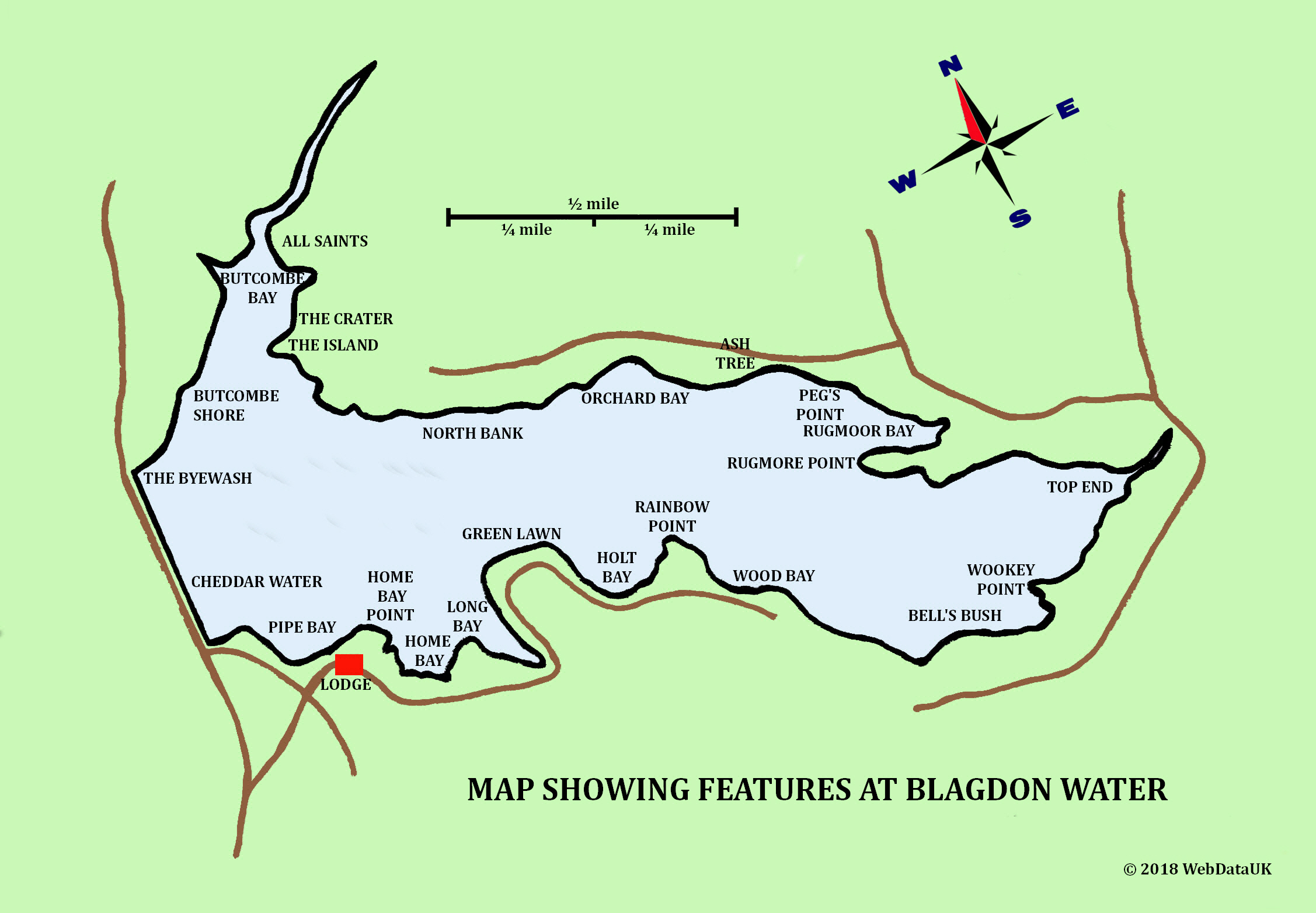
Angler's map of Blagdon Lake

Howard A. Bell (1888–1974) of Wrington was one of the first anglers to adopt an imitative approach to fly fishing on reservoirs in the early twentieth century. At a time when employing flashy 'attractor' patterns was the norm he employed the alternative tactic of using artificial flies that represented the shape and form of the creatures present in Blagdon Water where he fished regularly.

Conrad Voss Bark, BBC political correspondent and angling historian, had these words to say about him, "Dr Bell of Blagdon had the greatest formative influence of any man on the development of reservoir fishing in the first half of this century".

Howard Alexander Bell was born at Bletchingley, near Reigate, Surrey and studied to become a General Practitioner at Cambridge and St Bartholomew's Hospital in London. He was enlisted in the Royal Army Medical Corps and served abroad in Flanders and Palestine in World War I.

He was a shy, sensitive and reserved individual and the horrors of war affected him deeply. He was one of the few who survived the Battle of Passchendaele (also known as the Third Battle of Ypres) in 1917. The emotional scars of what he had witnessed as he tended the wounded and dying in Flanders were to remain with him for the rest of his life. It could well be that his wartime experiences led to his desire to live in idyllic surroundings and pursue the gentle art of fly fishing with such single-minded dedication.

A biography entitled Dr Bell of Wrington: Pioneer of Reservoir Fly Fishing written by Adrian Freer was published in 2019.

Biography of Dr Bell of Wrington

== Contribution to reservoir fly fishing ==
Bell was a bank angler and, as far as is recorded, he never fished from a boat. In its formative years Blagdon anglers would normally employ large sea trout or low water salmon flies during the daytime, very often using tandem and multi-hook arrangements; or alternatively lures at night. Dr Bell would use neither, but instead he preferred to fish with his own small imitative patterns.

Bell made it his practice to spoon all the trout he caught and after examining the contents he made an index of all the food available to the trout. Following on from that he devised imitations of all the creatures present and the local Blagdon anglers quickly followed his example

A fishing friend of Bell's, Alick Newsom, described his method of fishing as follows:

He liked to fish alone, always on the move, slowly covering sunken ditches, holes and weed beds as he sought to locate the trout.

Bell would always go off on his own, trying to avoid other rods. He had a pear-shaped landing net slung over his shoulder on a cord. He always fished from the bank with three unweighted flies on a gut cast, size 1X. He liked to fish over sunk ditches and holes and weed beds. He moved slowly along the bank, casting as he went. He cast out as far as was comfortable. He made no attempt to go for distance but let the flies sink slowly, judging the time so that the tail fly did not get snagged on the bottom. He used the knot at the end of his greased silk line as a bite indicator. When the flies were fully sunk he would gather them in slowly.

His flies were quite small, 10s, 12s, sometimes 14s. He might have a Worm Fly on a single hook on the point, a Grenadier on the middle dropper and a Buzzer on the top. All his dressings were plain and simple".

== Fly patterns designed by Dr Bell ==
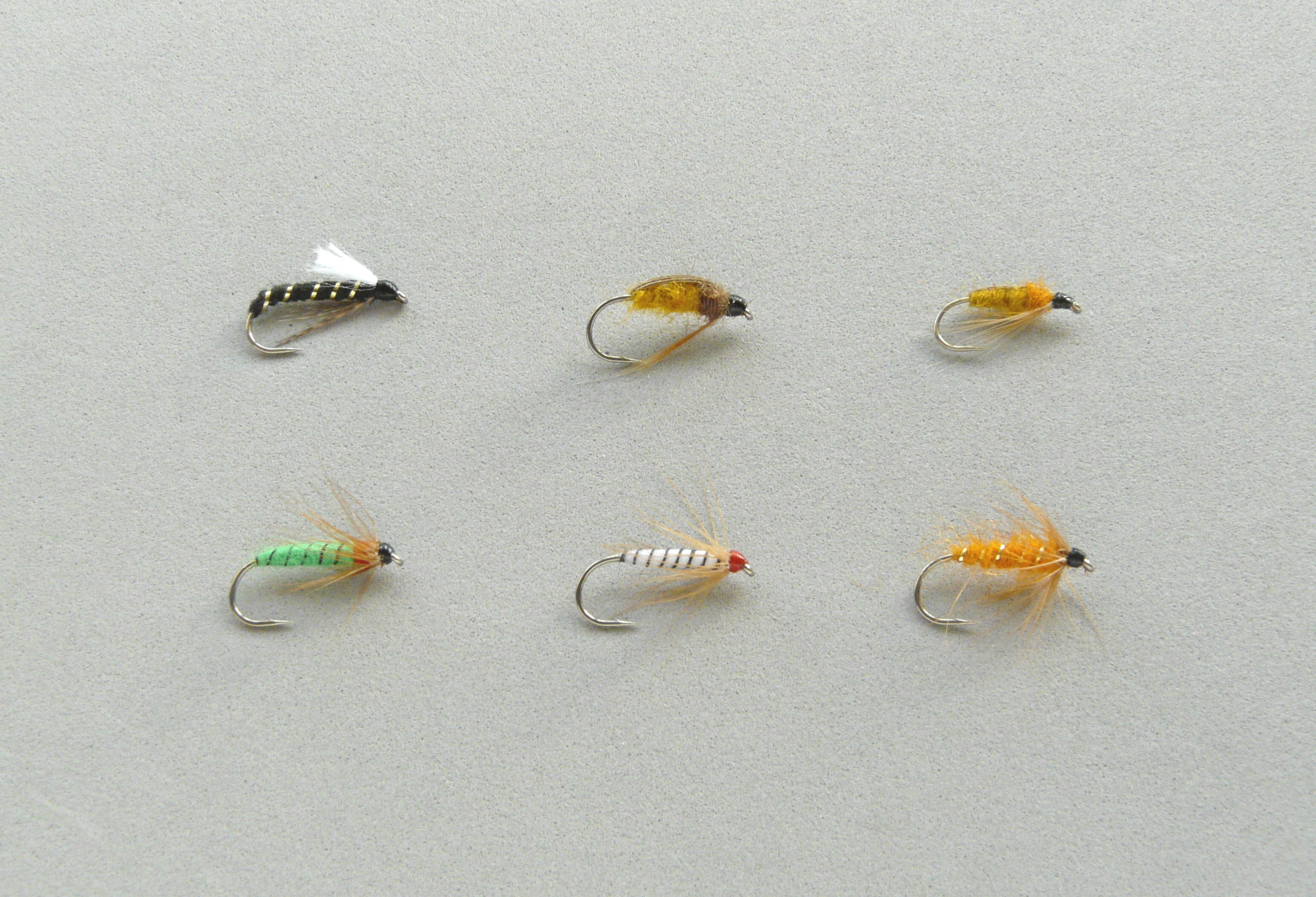
Reservoir nymph patterns devised by Dr Bell

Dr Bell has several reservoir nymph patterns to his credit: the Grenadier (bloodworm), Amber Nymph (sedge pupa), Blagdon Buzzer (midge pupa), and Corixa; derivatives of which are still in use on reservoirs almost one hundred years after their creation.

Among his lesser-known patterns are the Blagdon Green Midge which he may have devised with the assistance of others, Green & Orange Nymph, Translucent Nymph and Bloodworm Nymph.

Recent research (in 2018) has led to the publication of a number of previously undocumented flies designed by Dr Bell including the Stickle Fry, Green & Yellow Damsel Nymph and several other patterns.

A book documenting all Dr Bell's fly patterns of which there is a record entitled Dr Bell's Trout Flies: The Stillwater Nymph Patterns of Dr Bell written by Adrian V W Freer was published in 2020.

Regrettably, being the reclusive person that he was, many of his other patterns have been lost in the mists of time.

== Later years and death ==
Dr Bell eventually retired from medical practice in 1963 and carried on fishing for a few more years until, as a result of advancing age, he was unable to continue. He died on 2 December 1974 at the age of 86. His wife Sophia Mary 'Millie' Bell died a little over two years afterwards on 9 February 1977 and they are buried together in the churchyard at All Saints' Church, Wrington. There is a pathway off School Road in Wrington, Bell's Walk, which was named after the doctor.
