= William Talbot Aveline =

British geologist and archaeologist

- Born: 1822; Batheaston
- Died: 12 May 1903 (aged 80–81)

William Talbot Aveline (1822–1903) was a British geologist and archaeologist.

He was born in Batheaston, Somerset and grew up in Wrington. When he was 18 he became assistant to Henry De la Beche working for the Geological Survey. He undertook field work in the Mendip Hills, Wales, Derbyshire and the Lake District.

Aveline's Hole at Burrington Combe in the limestone of the Mendip Hills was named after him in 1860 by his friend and student William Boyd Dawkins.

In 1862 he married Elizabeth Perkins and they had seven children.

The Stockdale Shales were named by Aveline from the beck and hamlet of that name in Longsleddale.

In 1894 he became a fellow of the Geological Society and won the Murchison Medal which is awarded annually by the council of the Geological Society of London.

He died in London in 1903 and was buried in the churchyard of Church of All Saints, Wrington.
