= Glastonbury Tor =

Hill in Glastonbury, Somerset, England

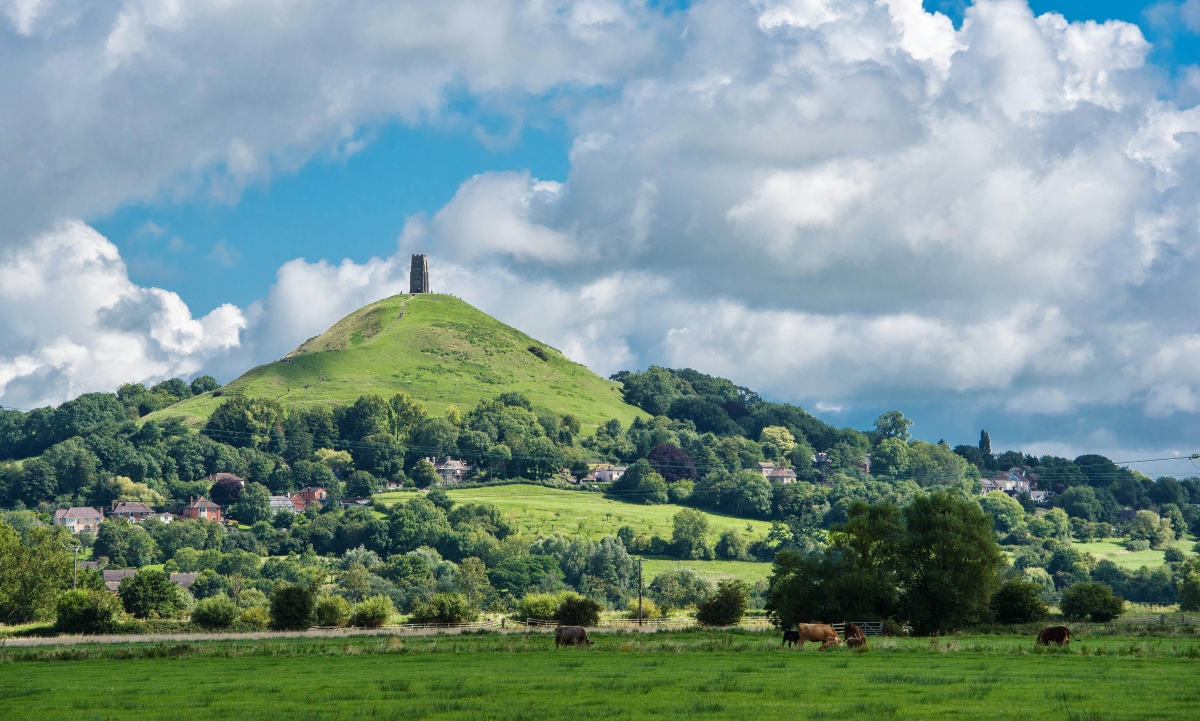
- Glastonbury Tor in 2017

- Location within Somerset
- 51°08′40″N 2°41′55″W
- Location: Glastonbury, Somerset, England

Site notes
- Governing body: National Trust

Scheduled monument
- Official name: St Michael's Church, monastic remains, and other settlement remains on Glastonbury Tor
- Designated: 24 April 1954
- Reference no.: 1019390

Listed Building – Grade I
- Official name: St Michael's Church Tower
- Designated: 21 June 1950
- Reference no.: 1345475

Glastonbury Tor is a hill near Glastonbury in the English county of Somerset, topped by the roofless tower of St Michael's Church, a Grade I listed building. The site is managed by the National Trust and has been designated a scheduled monument. The Tor is mentioned in Welsh mythology particularly in myths linked to King Arthur and the island of Avalon, and has several other enduring mythological and spiritual associations.

The conical hill of clay and Blue Lias rises from the Somerset Levels. It was formed when surrounding softer deposits were eroded, leaving a hard cap of sandstone exposed. The slopes of the hill are terraced, but the method by which they were formed remains unexplained.

Archaeological excavations during the 20th century sought to clarify the background of the monument and church, but some aspects of their history remain unexplained. Artefacts from human visitation have been found, dating from the Iron Age to Roman eras. Several buildings were constructed on the summit during Saxon and early medieval periods; they have been interpreted as an early church and monks' hermitage. The head of a wheel cross dating from the 10th or 11th century has been recovered. The original wooden church was destroyed by an earthquake in 1275, and the stone Church of St Michael was built on the site in the 14th century. Its tower remains, although it has been restored and partially rebuilt several times.

== Toponymy ==
The origin of the name Glastonbury is unclear, but when the settlement was first recorded in the late 7th and early 8th centuries it was called Glestingaburg. Of the latter name, Glestinga is obscure and may derive from an Old English word or Celtic personal name. It may derive from a person or kinship group named Glast. The second half of the name, -burg, is Anglo-Saxon in origin and could refer to either a fortified place such as a burh or, more likely, a monastic enclosure.

Tor is often used in the South West of England to refer to a prominent hill deriving from the Old English torr. (Note: Tor is often considered to have a Celtic etymology, but the Oxford English Dictionary lists no match in Cornish or Breton; the nearest Celtic word is the Welsh tẁr, from the Old Welsh tẁrr. The Old English torr is likely cognate with the Scottish Gaelic tòrr.) The Welsh name of the Tor was Ynys Wydrin, or sometimes Ynys Gutrin, meaning 'Isle of Glass'. During the 7th millennium BC, the plain was flooded, the isle becoming a peninsula at low tide.

== Location and landscape ==
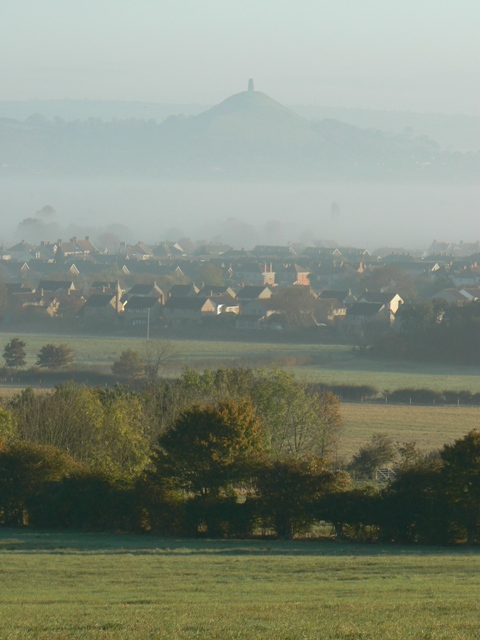
Glastonbury Tor and Street seen through the mist, as viewed from Walton Hill

The Tor is almost surrounded by the low-lying Somerset Levels, rising to an elevation of 518 feet (158 m). The Levels are reclaimed fen above which the Tor is clearly visible for miles around. It has been described as an island, but actually sits at the western end of a peninsula washed on three sides by the River Brue.

The Tor is formed from rocks dating from the early Jurassic Period, namely varied layers of Lias Group strata. The uppermost of these, forming the Tor itself, are a succession of rocks assigned to the Bridport Sand Formation. These rocks sit upon strata forming the broader hill on which the Tor stands; the various layers of the Beacon Limestone Formation and the Dyrham Formation. The Bridport Sands have acted as a caprock, protecting the lower layers from erosion.

The iron-rich waters of Chalice Well, a spring at the base of the Tor, flow out as an artesian well impregnating the sandstone around it with iron oxides that have reinforced it to produce the caprock. Iron-rich but oxygen-poor water in the aquifer carries dissolved iron (II) "ferrous" iron, but as the water surfaces and its oxygen content rises, the oxidised iron (III) "ferric" iron drops out as insoluble "rusty" oxides that bind to the surrounding stone, hardening it.

The low-lying damp ground can produce a visual effect known as a Fata Morgana when the Tor appears to rise out of the mist. This optical phenomenon occurs because rays of light are strongly bent when they pass through air layers of different temperatures in a steep thermal inversion where an atmospheric duct has formed. The Italian term Fata Morgana is derived from the name of Morgan le Fay, a powerful sorceress in Arthurian legend.

=== Terraces ===
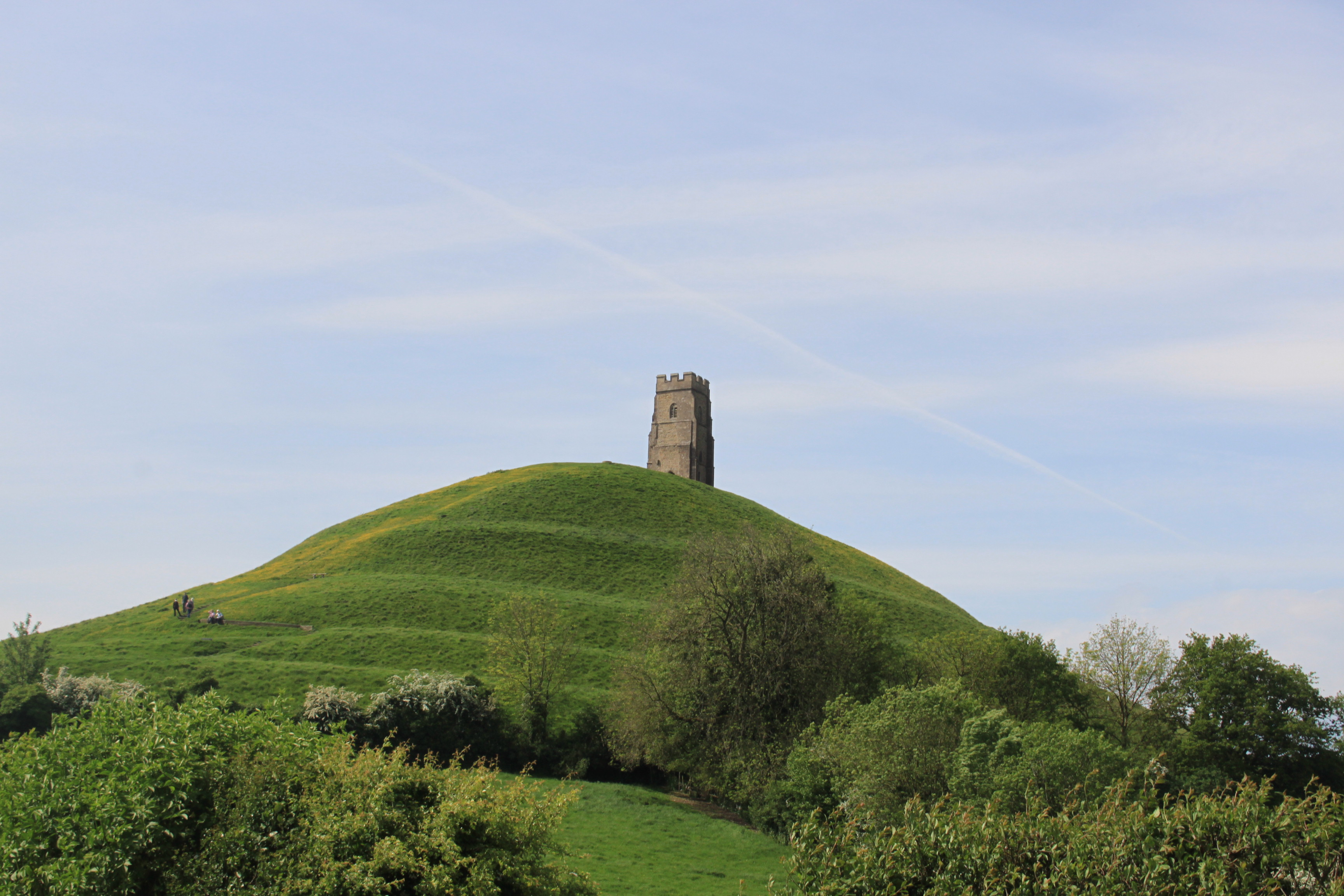
Terraces on the Tor

The sides of the Tor have seven deep, roughly symmetrical terraces, or lynchets. Their formation remains a mystery with many possible explanations. They may have been formed as a result of natural differentiation of the layers of Lias stone and clay or used by farmers during the Middle Ages as terraced hills to make ploughing for crops easier. Author Nicholas Mann questions this theory. If agriculture had been the reason for the creation of the terraces, it would be expected that the effort would be concentrated on the south side, where the sunny conditions would provide a good yield, but the terraces are equally deep on the northern side, which would provide little benefit. Additionally, none of the other slopes of the island have been terraced, even though the more sheltered locations would provide a greater return on the labour involved.

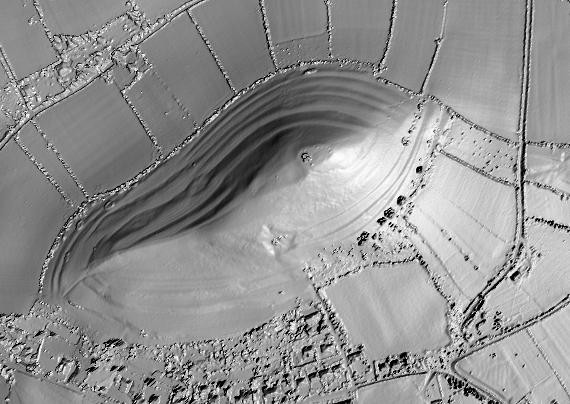
LIDAR topography

Other explanations have been suggested for the terraces, including the construction of defensive ramparts. Iron Age hill forts including the nearby Cadbury Castle in Somerset show evidence of extensive fortification of their slopes. The normal form of ramparts is a bank and ditch, but there is no evidence of this arrangement on the Tor. South Cadbury, one of the most extensively fortified places in early Britain, had three concentric rings of banks and ditches supporting an 44-acre (18 ha) enclosure. By contrast, the Tor has seven rings and very little space on top for the safekeeping of a community. It has been suggested, that a defensive function may have been linked with Ponter's Ball Dyke, a linear earthwork about 1 mile (1.6 km) east of the Tor. It consists of an embankment with a ditch on the east side. The purpose and provenance of the dyke are unclear. It is possible that it was part of a longer defensive barrier associated with New Ditch, three miles to the south-west, which is built in a similar manner. It has been suggested by Ralegh Radford that it is part of a great Celtic sanctuary, probably 3rd century BC, while others, including Philip Rahtz, date it to the post-Roman period and link it to the Dark Age occupation on Glastonbury Tor. The 1970 excavation suggests the 12th century or later. The historian Ronald Hutton also mentions the alternative possibility that the terraces are the remains of a medieval "spiral walkway" created for pilgrims to reach the church on the summit, similar to that at Whitby Abbey.

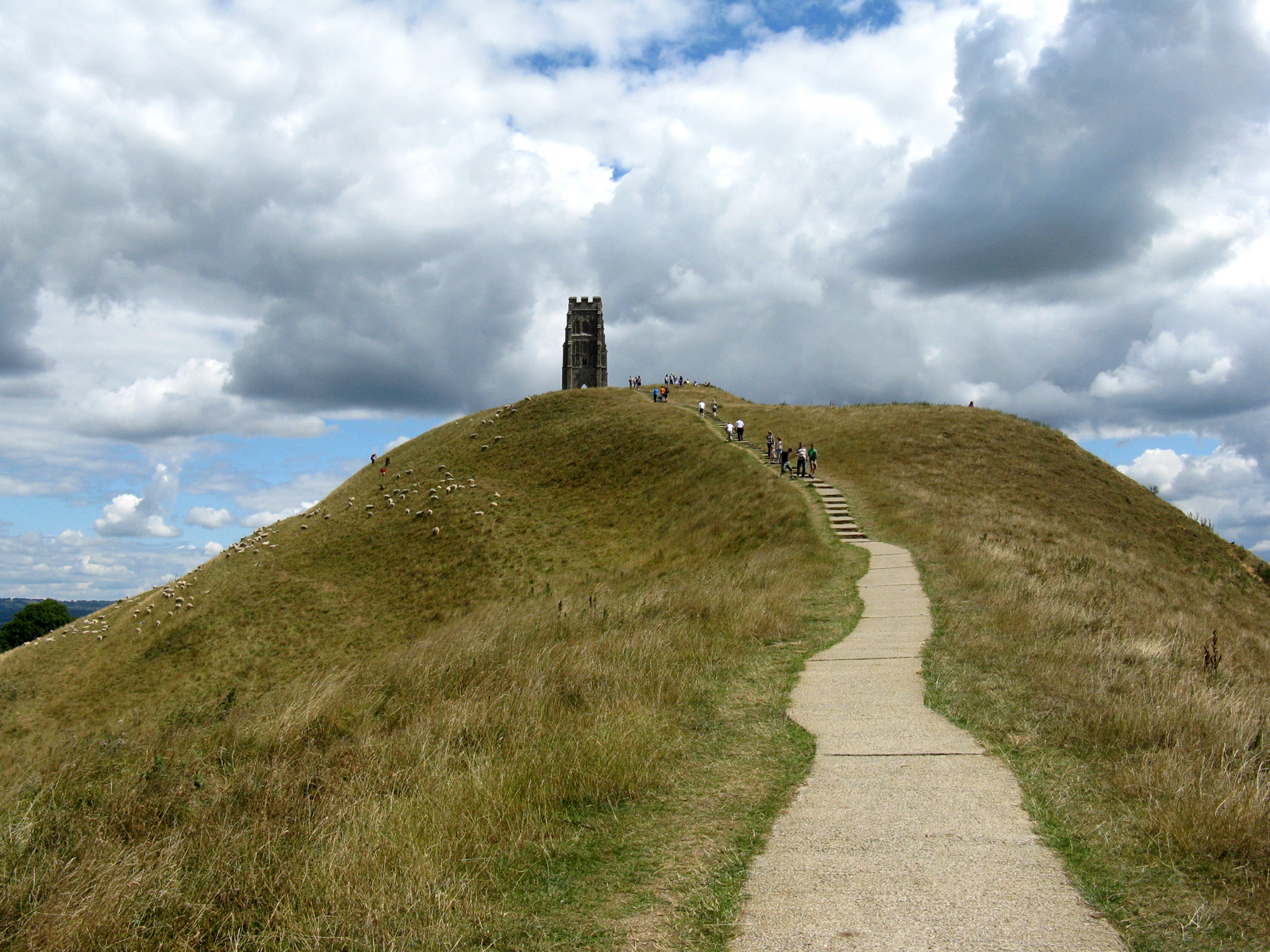
The last few yards of the concrete path up the Tor.

Another suggestion is that the terraces are the remains of a three-dimensional labyrinth, first proposed by Geoffrey Russell in 1968. He states that the classical labyrinth (Caerdroia), a design found all over the Neolithic world, can be easily transposed onto the Tor so that by walking around the terraces a person eventually reaches the top in the same pattern. Evaluating this hypothesis is not easy. A labyrinth would very likely place the terraces in the Neolithic era, but given the amount of occupation since then, there may have been substantial modifications by farmers or monks, and conclusive excavations have not been carried out. In a more recent book, Hutton writes that "the labyrinth does not seem to be an ancient sacred structure".

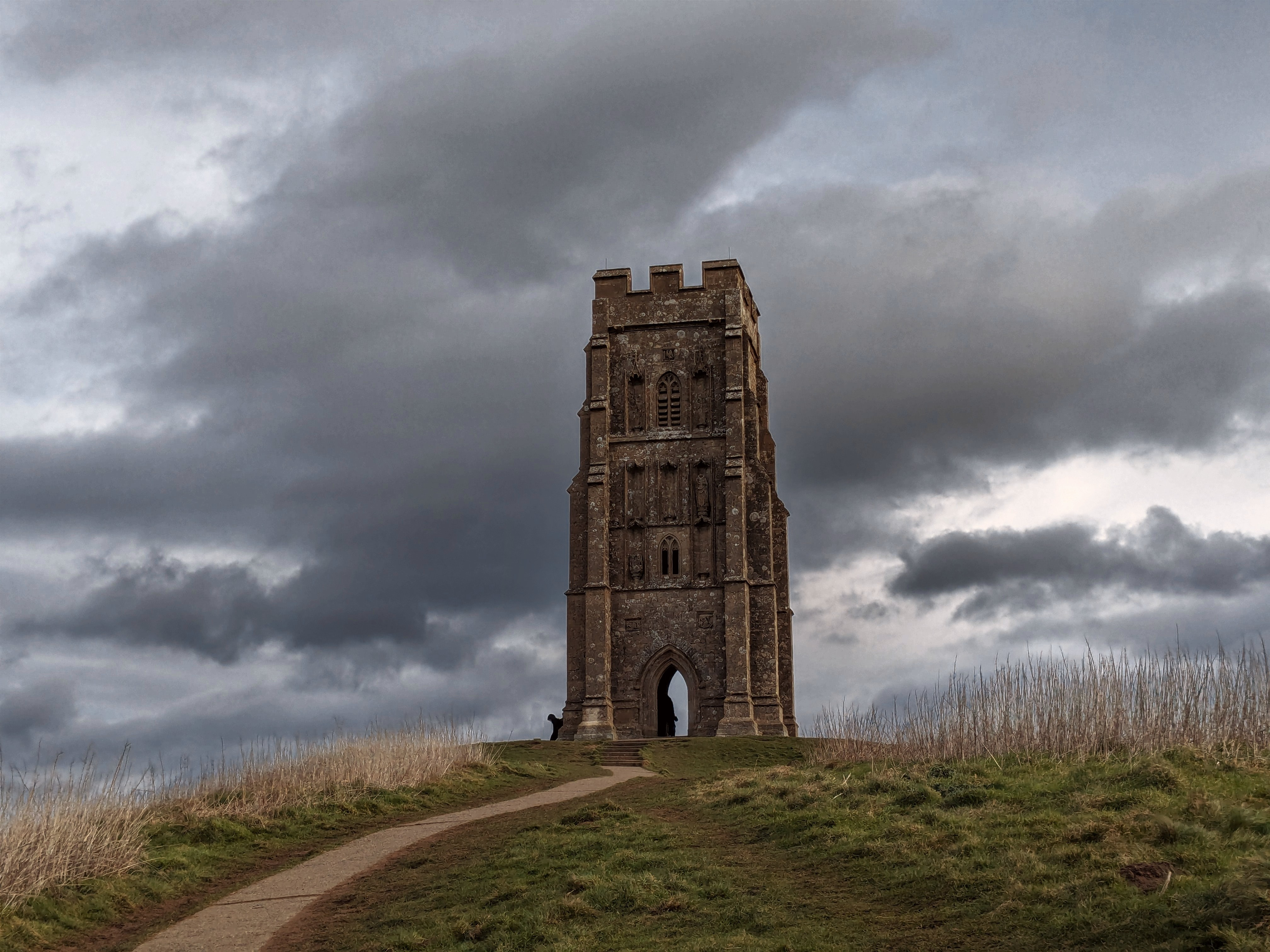
View from the main approach

== History ==
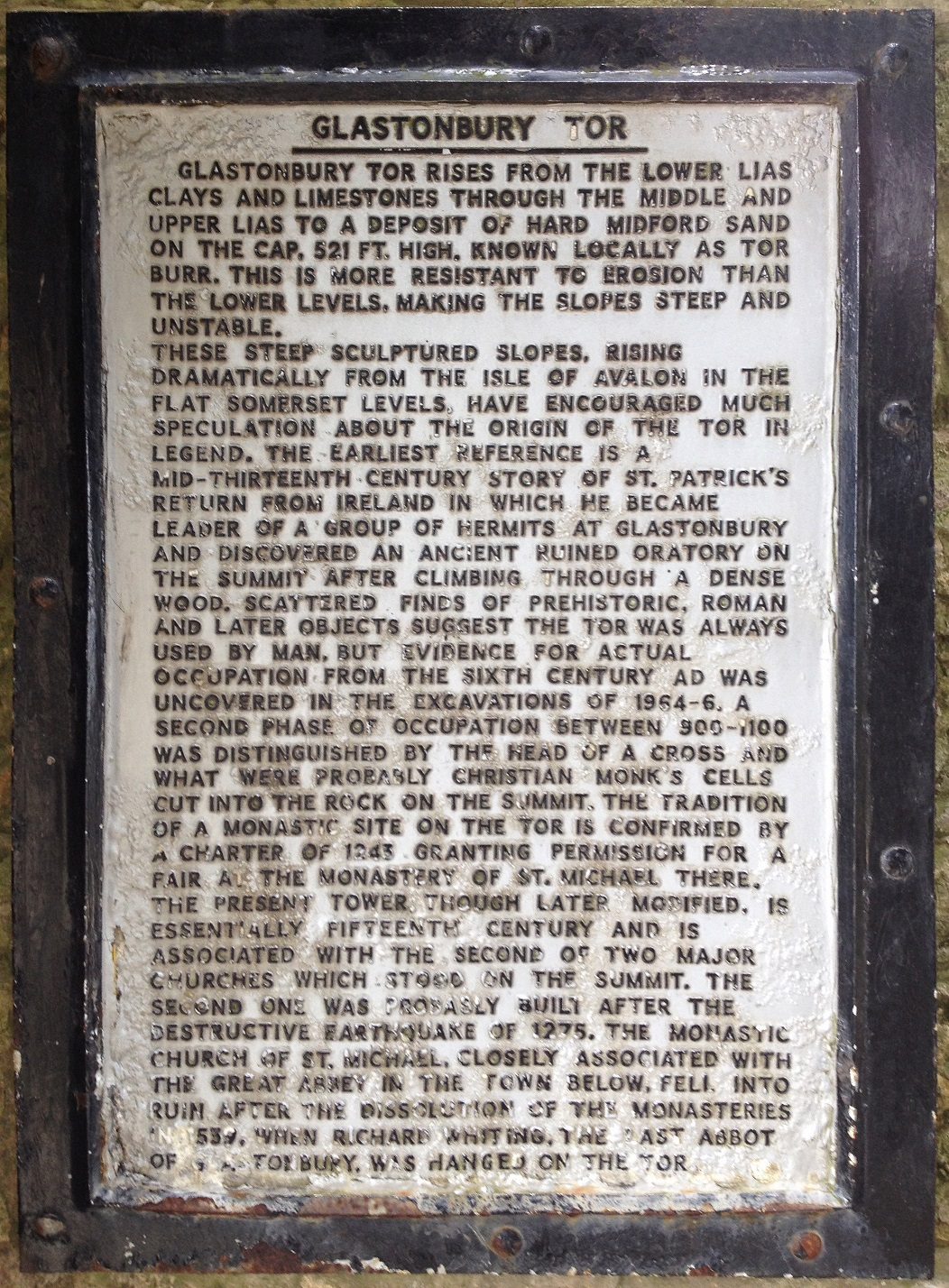
The plaque fitted to the wall inside the ruin of St Michael's Church atop Glastonbury Tor

=== Pre-Christian ===
Some Neolithic flint tools recovered from the top of the Tor show that the site has been visited, perhaps with a lasting occupation, since prehistory. The nearby remains of Glastonbury Lake Village were identified at the site in 1892, which confirmed that there was an Iron Age settlement in about 300–200 BC on what was an easily defended island in the fens. There is no evidence of permanent occupation of the Tor, but finds, including Roman pottery, do suggest that it was visited on a regular basis.

Excavations on Glastonbury Tor, undertaken by a team led by Philip Rahtz between 1964 and 1966, revealed evidence of Dark Age occupation during the 5th to 7th centuries around the later medieval church of St. Michael. Finds included postholes, two hearths including a metalworker's forge, two burials oriented north–south (thus unlikely to be Christian), fragments of 6th-century Mediterranean amphorae (vases for wine or cooking oil), and a worn hollow bronze head which may have topped a Saxon staff.

=== Christian settlement ===
During the late Saxon and early medieval period, there were at least four buildings on the summit. The base of a stone cross demonstrates Christian use of the site during this period, and it may have been a hermitage. The broken head of a wheel cross dated to the 10th or 11th century was found partway down the hill and may have been the head of the cross that stood on the summit. The head of the cross is now in the Museum of Somerset in Taunton.

The earliest timber church, dedicated to St Michael, is believed to have been constructed in the 11th or 12th century; from which post holes have since been identified. Associated monk cells have also been identified.

In 1243 Henry III granted a charter for a six-day fair at the site.

St Michael's Church was destroyed by an earthquake on 11 September 1275. According to the British Geological Survey, the earthquake was felt in London, Canterbury and Wales, and was reported to have destroyed many houses and churches in England. The intensity of shaking was probably greater than 7 on the Medvedev–Sponheuer–Karnik scale, with its epicentre in the area around Portsmouth or Chichester, South England.

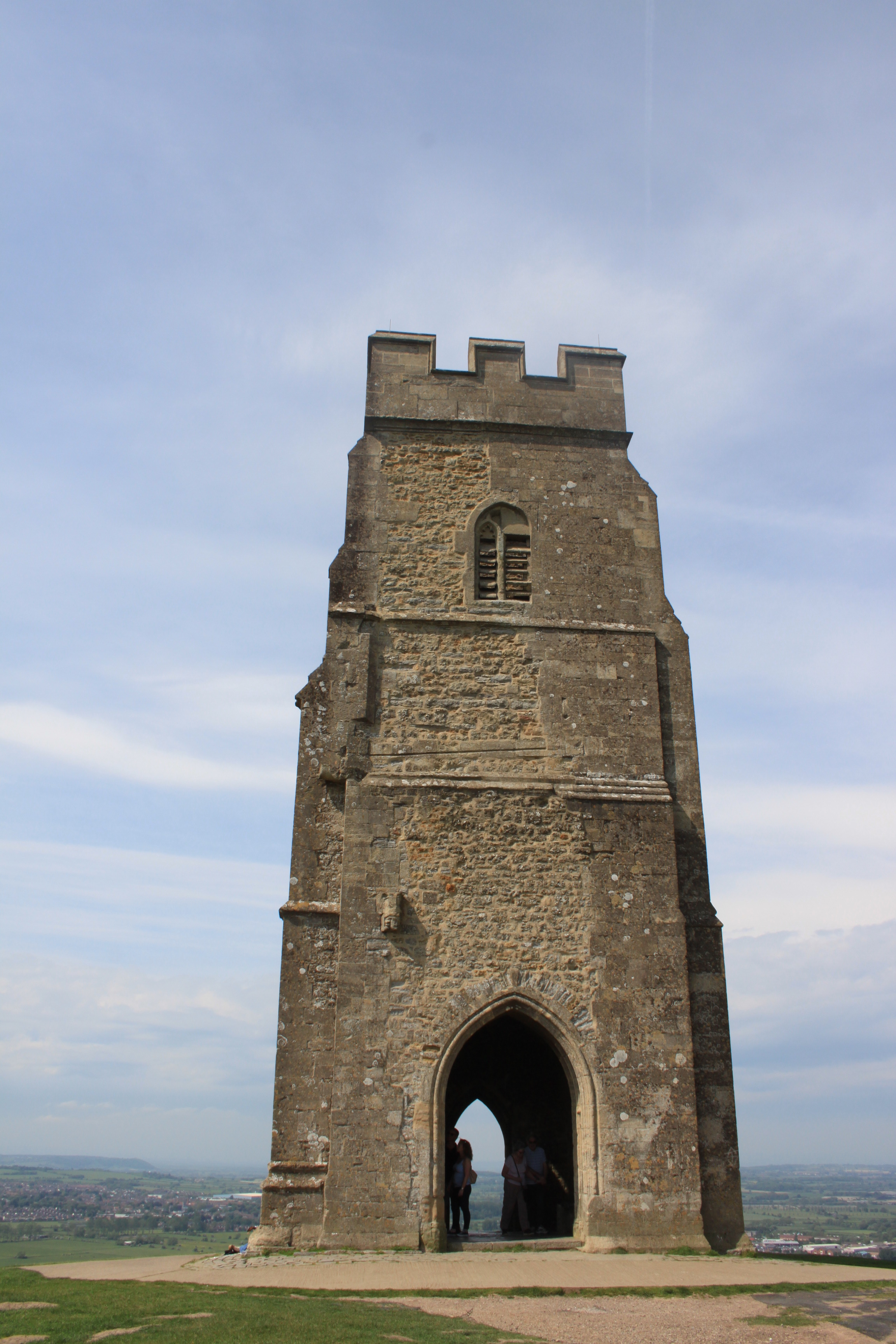
Ruins of the second St Michael's Church

A second church, also dedicated to St Michael, was built of local sandstone in the 14th century by the Abbot Adam of Sodbury, incorporating the foundations of the previous building. It included stained glass and decorated floor tiles. There was also a portable altar of Purbeck Marble; it is likely that the Monastery of St Michael on the Tor was a daughter house of Glastonbury Abbey.

St Michael's Church survived until the Dissolution of the Monasteries in 1539 when, except for the tower, it was demolished. The Tor was the place of execution where Richard Whiting, the last Abbot of Glastonbury Abbey, was hanged, drawn and quartered along with two of his monks, John Thorne and Roger James. The three-storey tower of St Michael's Church survives. It has corner buttresses and perpendicular bell openings. There is a sculptured tablet with an image of an eagle below the parapet.

=== Post-dissolution ===
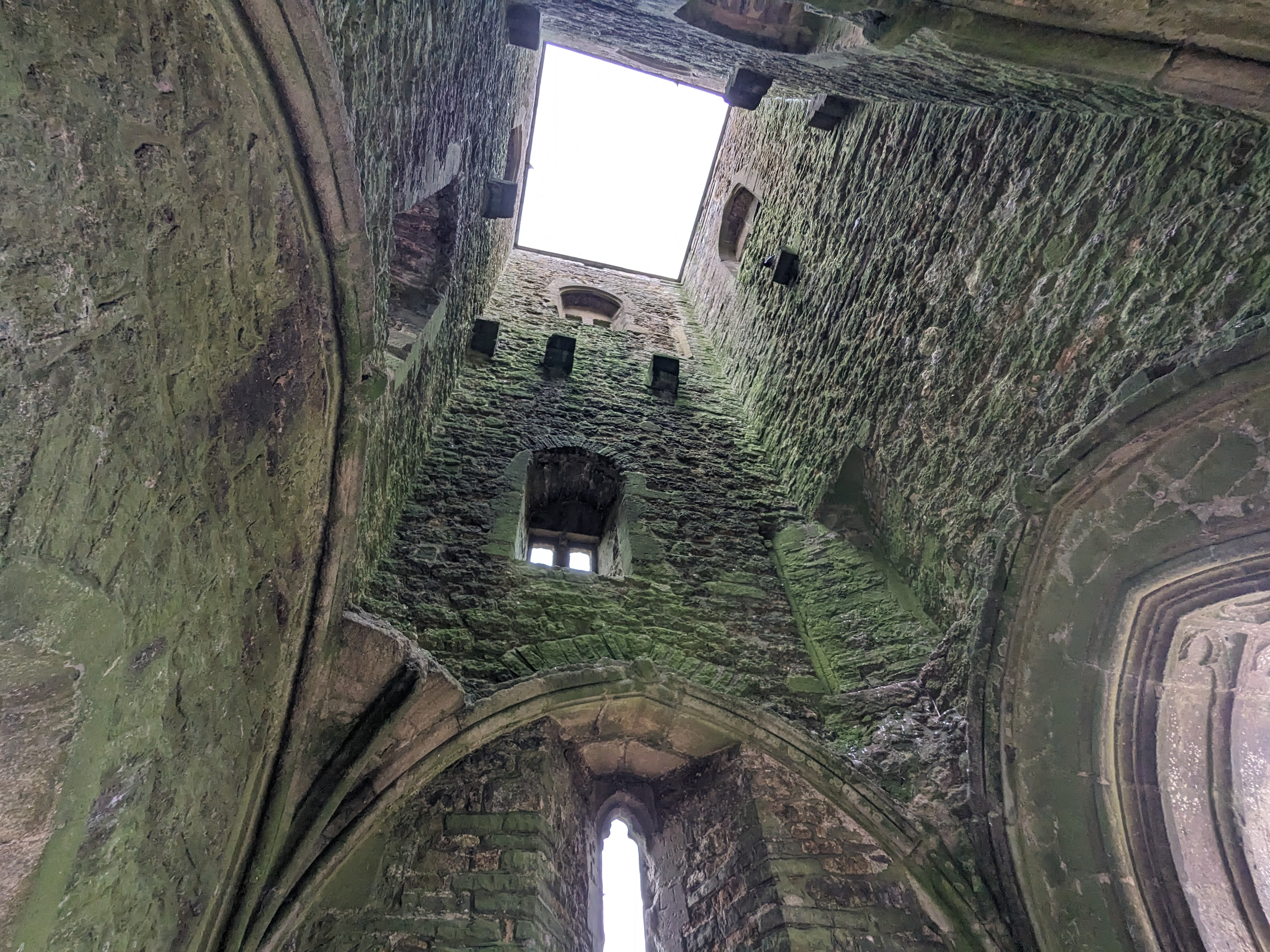
Interior of St. Michael's Tower

In 1786, Richard Colt Hoare of Stourhead bought the Tor and funded the repair of the tower in 1804, including the rebuilding of the north-east corner. It was then sold to the Very Rev. Hon. George Neville-Grenville and included in the Butleigh Manor until the 20th century. The last owner of the Tor was Robert Neville-Grenville who wished to give the Tor to the National Trust along with the Glastonbury Tribunal. After his death in 1936 it was sold to The National Trust which raised money by public subscription for its upkeep.

The National Trust took control of the Tor in 1937, but repairs were delayed until after the Second World War. During the 1960s, excavations identified cracks in the rock, suggesting the ground had moved in the past. This, combined with wind erosion, started to expose the footings of the tower, which were repaired with concrete. Erosion caused by the feet of the increasing number of visitors was also a problem and paths were laid to enable them to reach the summit without damaging the terraces. After 2000, enhancements to the access and repairs to the tower, including rebuilding of the parapet, were carried out. These included the replacement of some of the masonry damaged by earlier repairs with new stone from the Hadspen Quarry.

A proposed flag for Somerset (designed by Dil Roworth) featuring Glastonbury Tor and St Michael's Tower, which came third in the 2013 Somerset County Gazette competition to create a county flag for Somerset.

A model vaguely based on Glastonbury Tor (albeit with a tree instead of the tower) was incorporated into the opening ceremony of the 2012 Summer Olympics in London. As the athletes entered the stadium, their flags were displayed on the terraces of the model.

== Mythology and spirituality ==
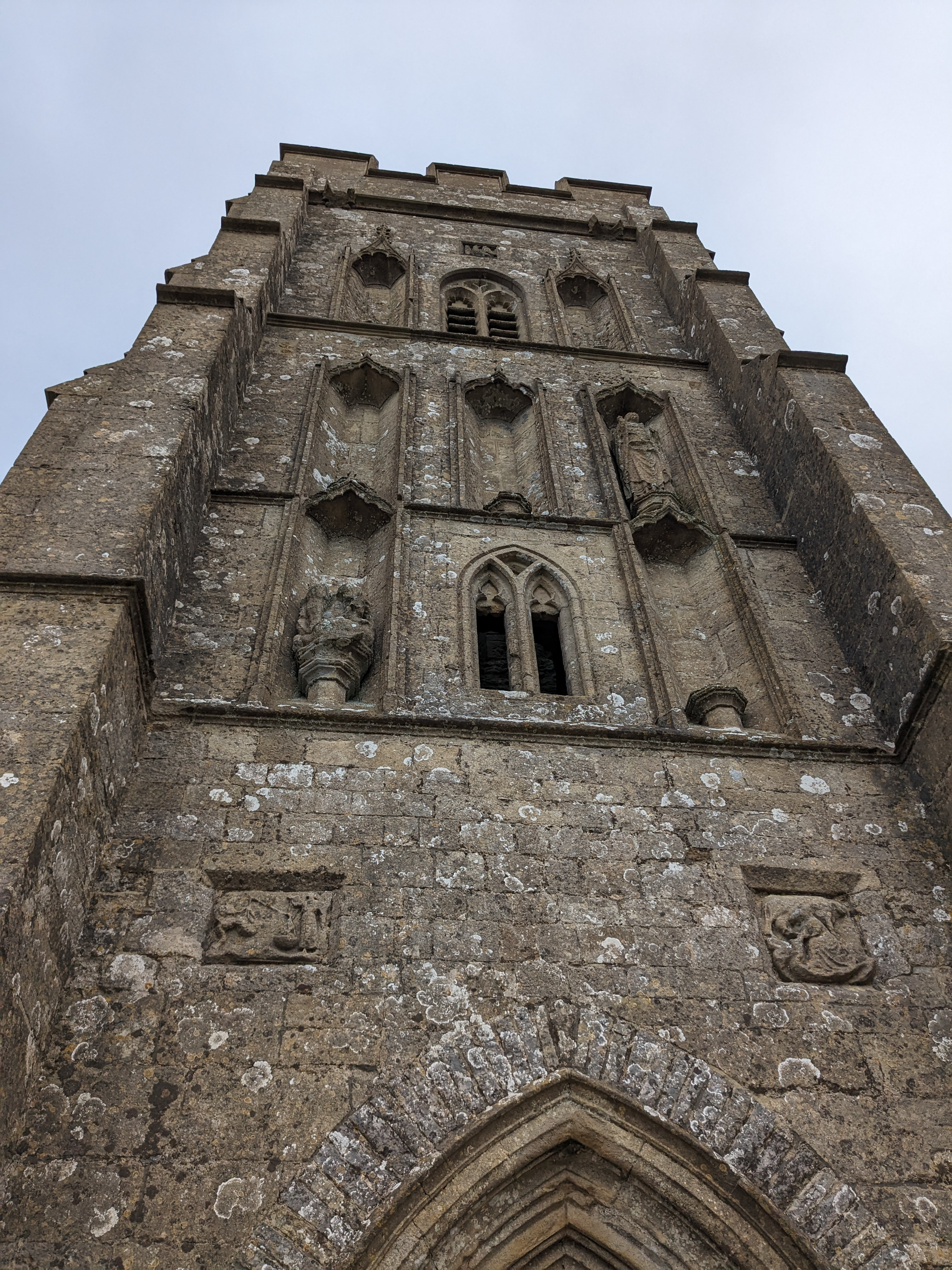
Front of the tower showing mythological iconography

The Tor seems to have been called Ynys Afallon (meaning 'The Isle of Avalon') by the Britons and is believed by some, including the 12th and 13th century writer Gerald of Wales, to be the Avalon of Arthurian legend. The Tor has been associated with the name Avalon, and identified with King Arthur, since the alleged discovery of his and Queen Guinevere's neatly labelled coffins in 1191, recounted by Gerald of Wales. Author Christopher L. Hodapp asserts in his book The Templar Code for Dummies that Glastonbury Tor is one of the possible locations of the Holy Grail, because it is close to the monastery that housed the Nanteos Cup.

The Tor has been a place of Christian pilgrimage at least since the 11th century and continues to be so, both because of the long-standing dedication to St. Michael the Archangel (the patron of many sacred mountains and hills) and more recently because of the martyrdoms of the three beatified Benedictine monks on its summit in the 16th century: Abbot Whiting, John Thorne and Roger James.

With the 19th-century resurgence of interest in Celtic mythology, the Tor became associated with Gwyn ap Nudd, the first Lord of the Otherworld (Annwn) and later King of the Fairies. The Tor came to be represented as an entrance to Annwn or to Avalon, the land of the fairies. The Tor is supposedly a gateway into "The Land of the Dead (Avalon)".

A persistent myth of more recent origin is that of the Glastonbury Zodiac, a purported astrological zodiac of gargantuan proportions said to have been carved into the land along ancient hedgerows and trackways, in which the Tor forms part of the figure representing Aquarius. The theory was first put forward in 1927 by Katherine Maltwood, an artist with interest in the occult, who thought the zodiac was constructed approximately 5,000 years ago. But the vast majority of the land said by Maltwood to be covered by the zodiac was under several feet of water at the proposed time of its construction, and many of the features such as field boundaries and roads are recent.

The Tor and other sites in Glastonbury have also been significant in the modern-day Goddess movement, with the flow from the Chalice Well seen as representing menstrual flow and the Tor being seen as either a breast or the whole figure of the Goddess. This has been celebrated with an effigy of the Goddess leading an annual procession up the Tor.

It is said that Brigid of Kildare is depicted milking a cow as a stone carving above one of the entrances to the tower.

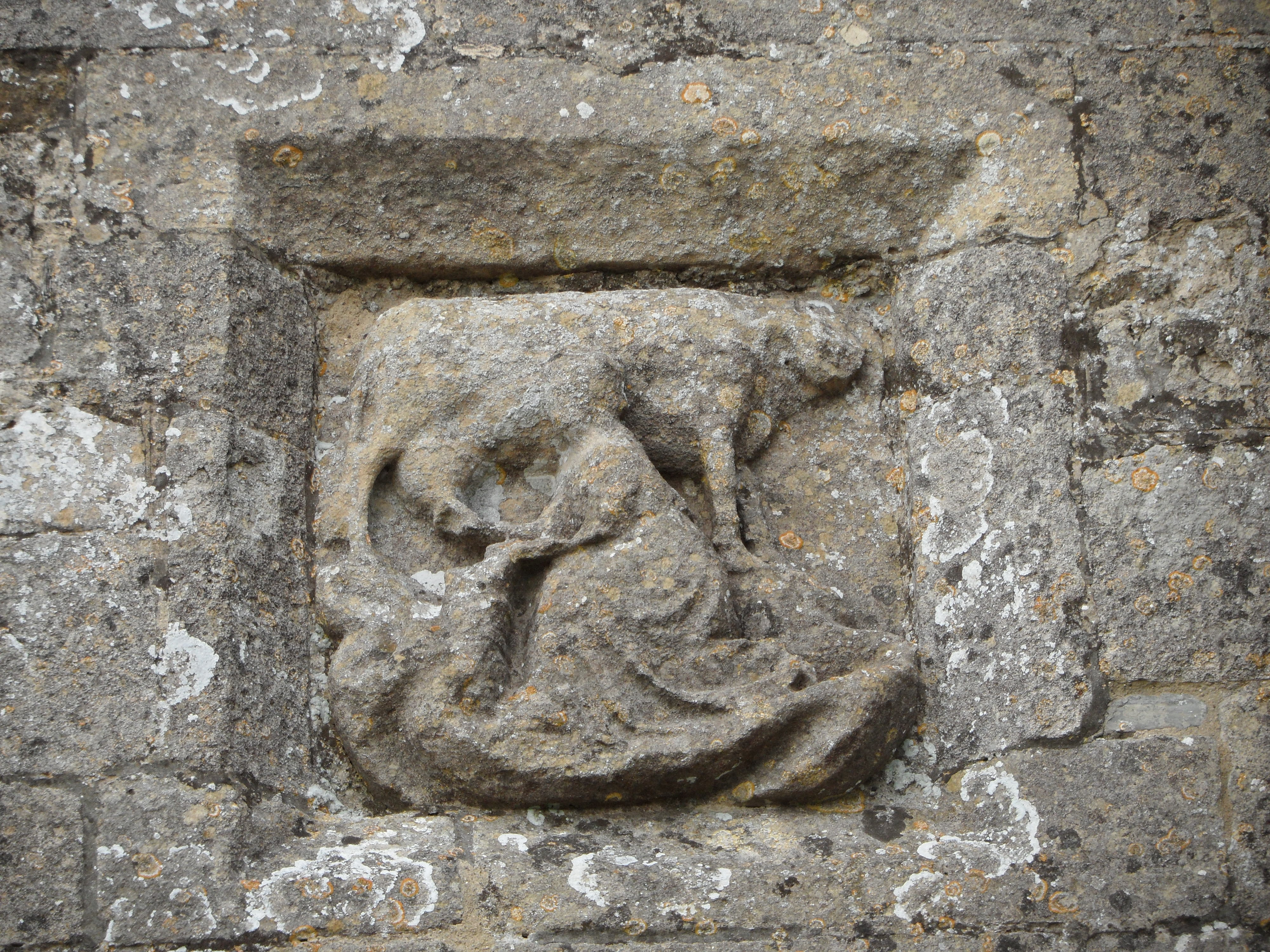
A stone carving that is said to depict St. Brigid milking a cow.

== See also ==
- List of hillforts and ancient settlements in Somerset
- List of National Trust properties in Somerset
- 1275 British earthquake

== Bibliography ==
- Abrams, Lesley; Carley, James (1991). The Archaeology and History of Glastonbury Abbey: Essays in Honour of the Ninetieth Birthday of C. A. Ralegh Radford. Boydell Press. ISBN 978-0-85115-284-4.
- Adkins, Lesley; Adkins, Roy (1992). A Field Guide to Somerset Archaeology. Dovecote Press. ISBN 978-0-946159-94-9.
- Allcroft, Arthur Hadrian (1908). Earthwork of England: Prehistoric, Roman, Saxon, Danish, Norman and Mediæval. Nabu Press. ISBN 978-1-178-13643-2.
- Bowden-Pickstock, Susan (2009). Quiet Gardens: The Roots of Faith?. Continuum International Publishing Group. ISBN 978-1-84706-341-0.
- Bowman, Marion (2004). "Procession and Possession in Glastonbury: Continuity, Change and the Manipulation of Tradition". Folklore. 115 (3): 273–85. doi:10.1080/0015587042000284266. JSTOR 30035212.
- Bowman, Marion (2005). "Ancient Avalon, New Jerusalem, Heart Chakra of Planet Earth: The Local and the Global in Glastonbury". Numen: International Review for the History of Religions. 52 (2): 157–190. doi:10.1163/1568527054024722. JSTOR 3270462. Archived from the original on 13 December 2013.
- Bowman, Marion (2008). "Going with the flow: Contemporary pilgrimage in Glastonbury". In Margry, Peter Jan (ed.). Shrines and Pilgrimage in the Modern World: New Itineraries into the Sacred. Amsterdam University Press. pp. 241–280. ISBN 978-90-8964-011-6.
- Castleden, Rodney (1999). King Arthur: The Truth Behind the Legend. Routledge. ISBN 978-0-415-19575-1.
- Ditmas, E.M.R. (1964). "The Cult of Arthurian Relics". Folklore. 75 (1): 19–33. doi:10.1080/0015587X.1964.9716942.
- Ekwall, Eilert (1960). The Concise Oxford Dictionary of English Place Names. Oxford University Press. ISBN 978-0-19-869103-7.
- Garner, Keith (2004). "Survival of an ancient tower". Building Conservation Journal (35): 18–21. Archived from the original on 29 October 2013.
- Gathercole, Clare (2003). "Glastonbury" (PDF). Somerset Urban Archaeological Survey. South West Heritage Trust. Archived from the original (PDF) on 29 October 2013.
- Gray, Louis H. (January 1935). "The origin of the name of Glastonbury". Speculum. 10 (1): 46–53. doi:10.2307/2848235. JSTOR 2848235. S2CID 163603868.
- Hawkins, Desmond (1989). Avalon and Sedgemoor. Tabb House. ISBN 978-0-907018-72-8.
- Hodapp, Christopher; Von Kannon, Alice (2007). The Templar Code for Dummies. John Wiley & Sons. ISBN 978-0-470-12765-0.
- Hutton, Ronald (2006). Witches, Druids and King Arthur. Hambledon Continuum. ISBN 978-1-85285-555-0.
- Hutton, Ronald (2013). Pagan Britain. Yale University Press. ISBN 978-0-300-19771-6.
- Ivakhiv, Adrian (2001). Claiming Sacred Ground: Pilgrims and Politics at Glastonbury and Sedona. Indiana University Press. ISBN 978-0-253-33899-0.
- Koch, John T. (2006). Celtic Culture: A Historical Encyclopedia. ABC-CLIO Ltd. ISBN 978-1-85109-440-0.
- MacLaran, Pauline; Scott, Linda M. (2009). "Magic and Merchandise Spiritual Shopping in Glastonbury". Advertising & Society Review. 10 (4). doi:10.1353/asr.0.0039. S2CID 167550793.
- MacQueen, Gailand (2005). Spirituality of Mazes and Labyrinths. Northstone Publishing. ISBN 978-1-896836-69-0.
- Maltwood, Katherine (1987). Guide to Glastonbury's Temple of the Stars. James Clarke & Co. ISBN 978-0-227-67867-1.
- Mann, Nicholas R. (2011). Glastonbury Tor: A Guide to the History and Legends. The Temple Publications. ISBN 978-0-9557400-8-4.
- Mann, Nicholas R. (1986). Glastonbury Tor: A Guide to the History and Legends. Annenterprise. ISBN 978-1-85613-151-3.
- Musson, R.W.W (2003). "Fatalities in British earthquakes". Astronomy and Geophysics. 44 (1): 1.14 – 1.16. doi:10.1046/j.1468-4004.2003.44114.x.
- Nitze, W.A. (1934). "The exhumation of King Arthur at Glastonbury". Speculum. 19 (4): 355–361. doi:10.2307/2850219. JSTOR 2850219. S2CID 163005650.
- Rahtz, Philip (1993). English Heritage Book of Glastonbury. Batsford. ISBN 978-0-7134-6866-3.
- Rahtz, Phillip; Watts, Lorna (2003). Glastonbury: Myth and Archaeology. Tempus Publishing. ISBN 978-0-7524-2548-1.
- Robinson, Stephen (1992). Somerset Place Names. Dovecote Press. ISBN 978-1-874336-03-7.
- Siraut, M.C.; Thacker, A.T.; Williamson, Elizabeth (2006a). Dunning, R.W. (ed.). "Introduction". A History of the County of Somerset: Volume 9: Glastonbury and Street. Institute of Historical Research.
- Siraut, M.C.; Thacker, A.T.; Williamson, Elizabeth (2006b). Dunning, R.W. (ed.). "Glastonbury: Parish". A History of the County of Somerset: Volume 9: Glastonbury and Street. Institute of Historical Research.
- Stanton, Richard (1892). A Menology of England and Wales. Burns & Oates.
- Vallins, John (24 June 2013). "History and myth entangled around Somerset's most notable landmark". The Guardian.
- Walmsley, Eric (2013). King Arthur's Battle for Britain. Matador. ISBN 978-1-78088-400-4.
- Wylie, John (2002). "An essay on ascending Glastonbury Tor". Geoforum. 33 (4): 441–454. doi:10.1016/S0016-7185(02)00033-7.
- Young, Thomas (1807). A Course of Lectures on Natural Philosophy and the Mechanical Arts. Johnson. p. 302. "Glastonbury Tor."
