= Wrington railway station =

Disused railway station in Wrington, North Somerset

Coordinates: 51.3589°N 2.7648°W

Wrington
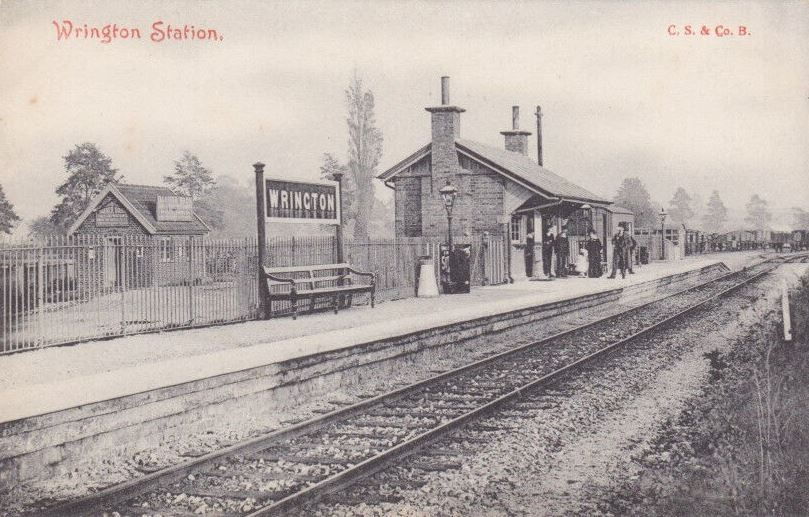
- Wrington railway station looking east

General information
- Location: Wrington, North Somerset; England
- Platforms: 1

Other information
- Status: Disused

History
- Original company: Great Western Railway
- Pre-grouping: Great Western Railway
- Post-grouping: Great Western Railway

Key dates
- 4 December 1901: Opened
- 14 September 1931: Closed to passengers
- 10 June 1963: Closed to goods
Location

Wrington railway station was a station at Wrington on the Wrington Vale Light Railway, which ran from Congresbury to Blagdon, in Somerset, England.

The station was opened on 4 December 1901 as a single-platform station.

The station provided a service to passengers up until 14 September 1931, mostly to Bristol via Congresbury. In 1926 on Mondays a train would leave Wrington at 7:38 for workers needing to reach Bristol before business hours. Competition from the direct bus service via the A38, caused a steep decline in passengers numbers.

The line from Blagdon to Wrington closed in 1950 but the line to Wrington was still in use carrying goods (chiefly coal) until closed completely on 10 June 1963.

== Since closure ==
The platform and level crossing gates remained in place into the 1970s, when the site was owned by a coal merchant.

The site of the station is now housing (the glebe, old station close) and a veterinary centre.
