= Stockdale Shales =

- Stratigraphic range: Silurian
- Type: Formation

Lithology
- Primary: Slate

Location
- Region: England
- Country: United Kingdom

The Stockdale Shales is a geologic formation in England. It preserves fossils dating back to the Silurian period.

The shales were named by W. Talbot Aveline from the beck and hamlet of that name in Longsleddale.

== See also ==
- List of fossiliferous stratigraphic units in England
- Stockdale Group
