= Thomas Wykes (chronicler) =

13th-century English chronicler

Thomas Wykes (11 March 1222 – c. 1292), English chronicler, was a canon regular of Oseney Abbey, near Oxford.

He was the author of a chronicle extending from 1066 to 1289, which is printed among the monastic annals edited by Henry Richards Luard for the Rolls Series. He gives an account of the Second Barons' War from a royalist standpoint, and is a severe critic of Montfort's policy. His work regarding the reign of Edward I is especially useful. His chronicles are connected with the Oseney Annals, which are printed parallel with his work by Luard, but Wykes is an independent authority between 1258 and 1278.
