= Wrington =

Village in the Mendips of Somerset, England

Coordinates: 51.361°N 2.763°W

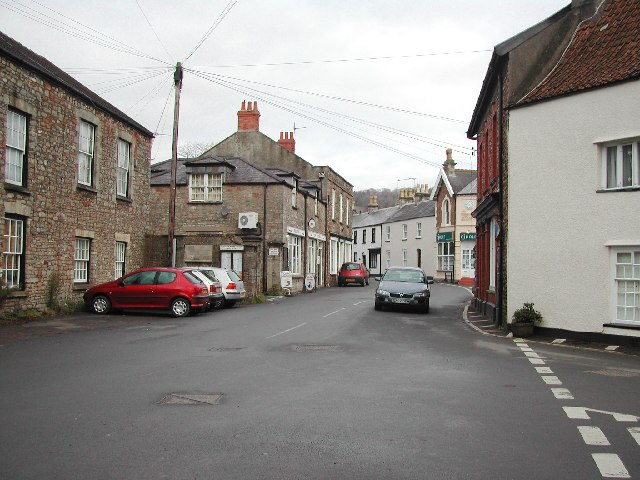
- Wrington High Street

- Location within Somerset
- Population: 2,633
- OS grid reference: ST470628
- Unitary authority: North Somerset
- Ceremonial county: Somerset
- Region: South West
- Country: England
- Sovereign state: United Kingdom
- Post town: BRISTOL
- Postcode district: BS40
- Dialling code: 01934
- Police: Avon and Somerset
- Fire: Avon
- Ambulance: South Western
- UK Parliament: North Somerset

Wrington is a village and a civil and ecclesiastical parish on the north slopes of the Mendip Hills in North Somerset, England. Both include nearby Redhill. Wrington lies in the valley of the Congresbury Yeo river, about 9 miles (14 km) east of Weston-super-Mare and 3 miles (4.8 km) south-east of Yatton. Its population was 2,633 at the 2011 Census.

== History ==
The village was inhabited in Roman times and there is evidence of Saxon occupation as well. Historically it was part of the hundred of Brent-cum-Wrington.

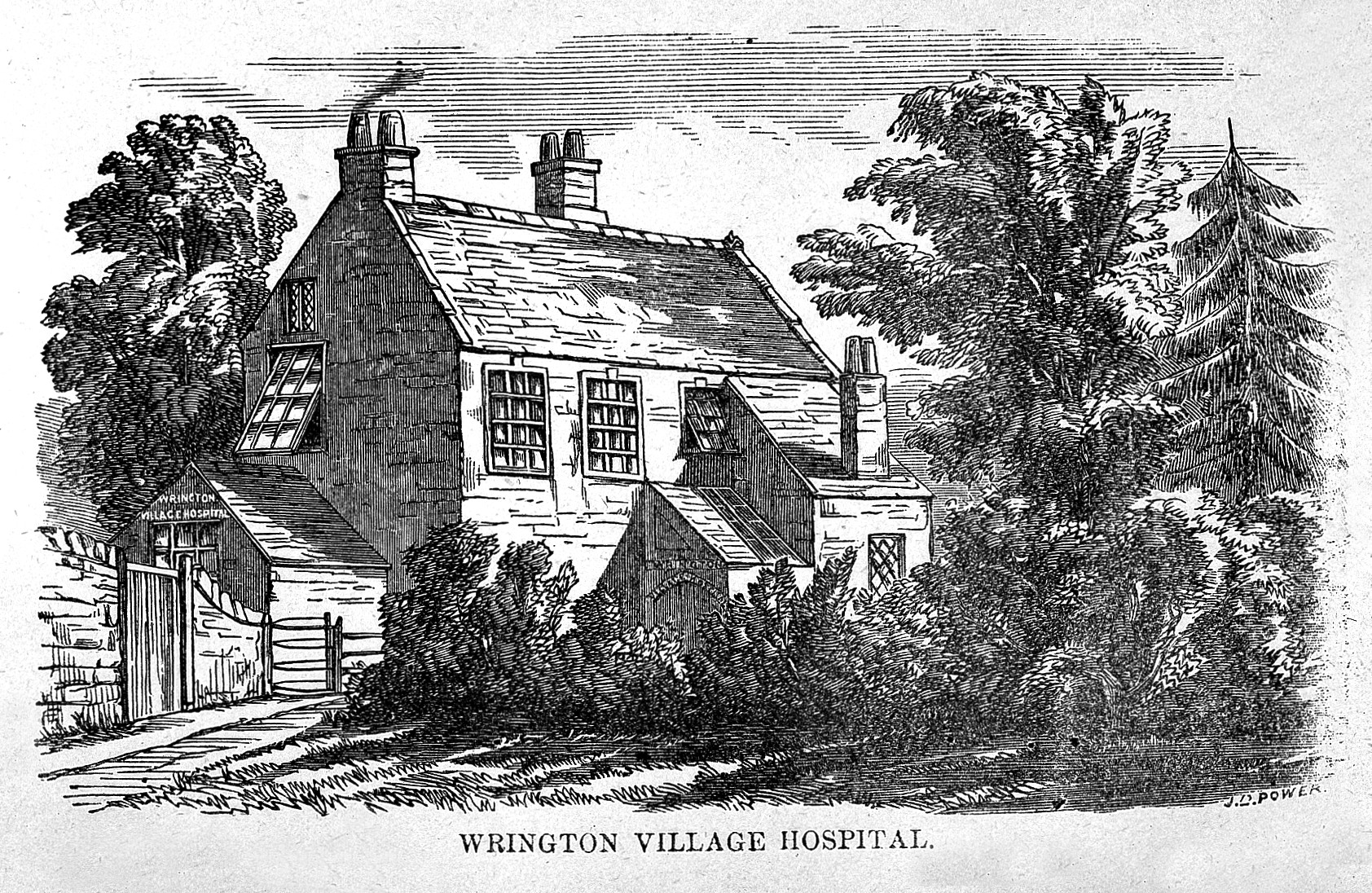
Wrington Cottage Hospital

Wrington Cottage Hospital opened in 1864, initially for 24 patients. The first surgeon was Horace Swete, author of the Handy Book of Cottage Hospitals, to which Florence Nightingale also referred in 1869.

Wrington had a railway station between 1901 and 1963, on the Wrington Vale Light Railway that ran from Congresbury to Blagdon.

== Governance ==
As a parish council, Wrington's sets an annual precept for operating costs and produces annual accounts for public scrutiny. It maintains and repairs parish facilities, under the unitary authority of North Somerset, created in 1996 separately from today's non-metropolitan county and based at Weston-super-Mare. Before 1974 the parish belonged to Axbridge Rural District, then in 1974–1996 to the Woodspring district of the county of Avon.

An electoral ward bearing the same name includes Butcombe as well as Wrington. The ward population at the 2011 census was 2,851. The parish is represented in Parliament by the North Somerset constituency, which elects one member by the first past the post system, currently Sadik Al-Hassan of the Labour Party.

== Church ==
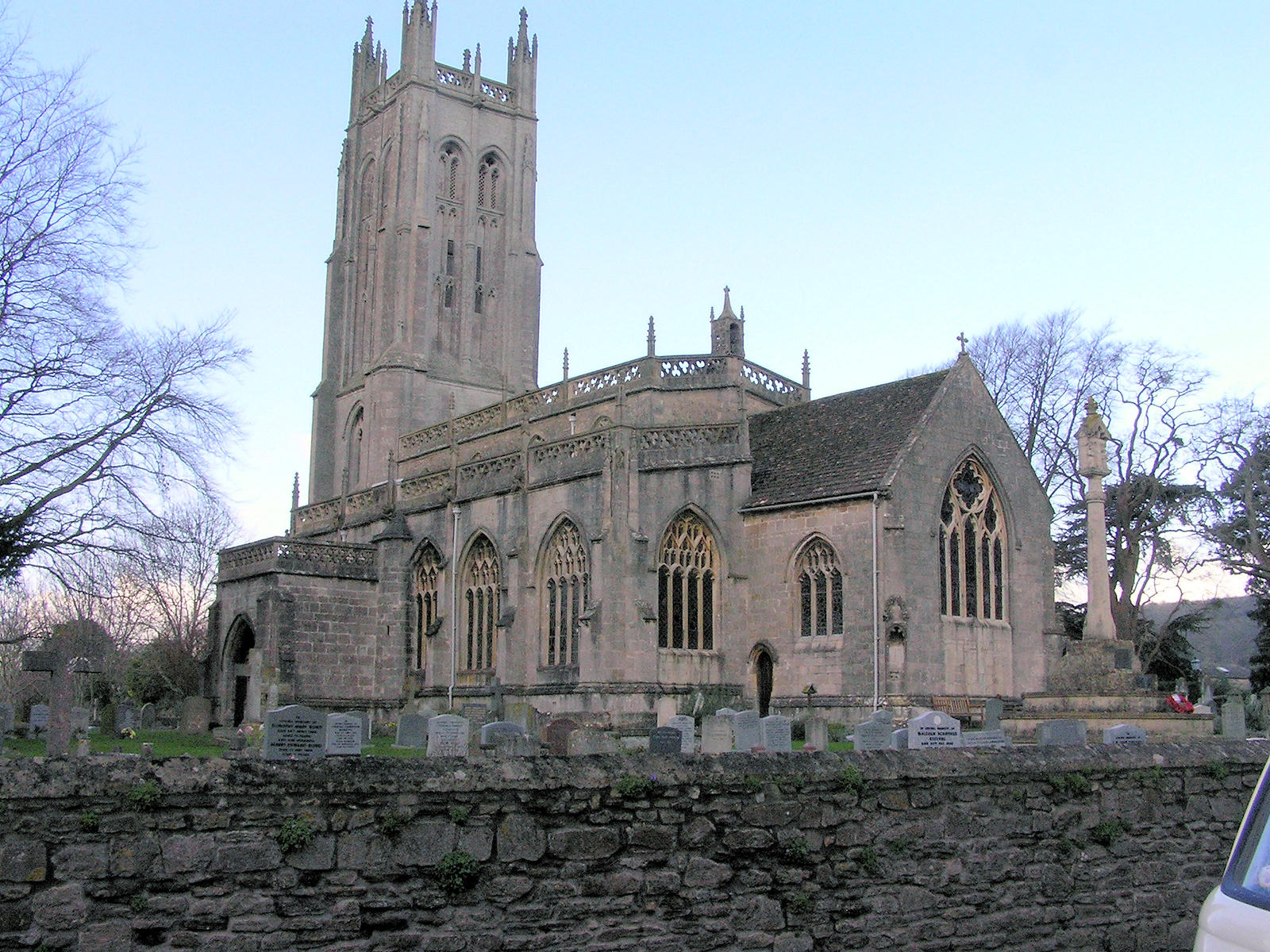
The church of All Saints

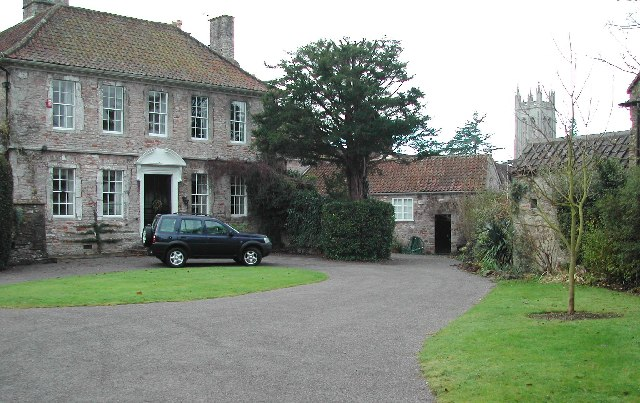
The old rectory with the church in the background

The Church of All Saints has 13th-century foundations. It was remodelled with a west tower added about 1450. Restoration occurred in 1859 and restoration of the tower in 1948. Either side of the door stone are busts of John Locke and Hannah More from the early 19th century. The chancel has an 1832 Gothic reredos by Charles Barry. The rood screen is from the 16th century. The tall four-stage tower has set-back buttresses crowned by crocketed pinnacles at the top stage, which displays moulded string courses and a trefoil-pierced triangular parapet with gargoyles and corner pinnacles. The building is Grade I listed as "one of the highest achievements of architectural genius". It dates from 1420 to 1450. The belfry stairs are in the south-east turret. The tower stands 113.5 feet (35 m) to the tip of its pinnacles.

The 17th-century rectory is Grade II listed.

The church's bells ring automatically. Until 2012, they did so every 15 minutes even through the night, but after a noise abatement order was served, it was reduced to hourly at night.

== Primary school ==
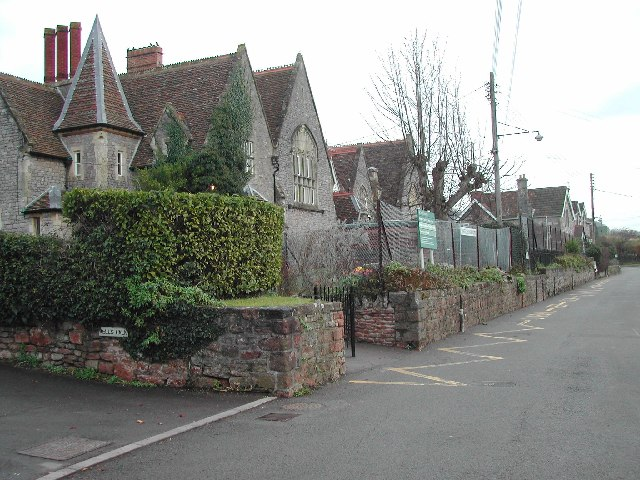
Wrington Church of England Primary School

The village primary school was opened on 1 May 1857. Its premises are Grade II listed.

== Butcombe Brewery ==
A local institution is the Butcombe microbrewery, set up in nearby Butcombe in 1978 by Simon Whitmore, managing director of Courage Western, made redundant in a restructuring, and his wife Maureen. In 2003 the business was sold to Guy Newell and Paul Horsley and moved to a purpose-built brewery completed in March 2005 on an estate at Wrington.

In the same year the brewery set up a joint venture with Thatchers Cider to produce a keg cider. Its 2008 output was 24,000 barrels a year through about 450 outlets.

By 2025, the brewery had grown into pub and brewing business Butcombe Group headquartered in Jersey, operating over 120 pubs with over 400 rooms across Southern England and in the Channel Islands. It operates a brewery in Wrington, and a large distribution and bottling centre in Bridgwater.

== Notable residents ==
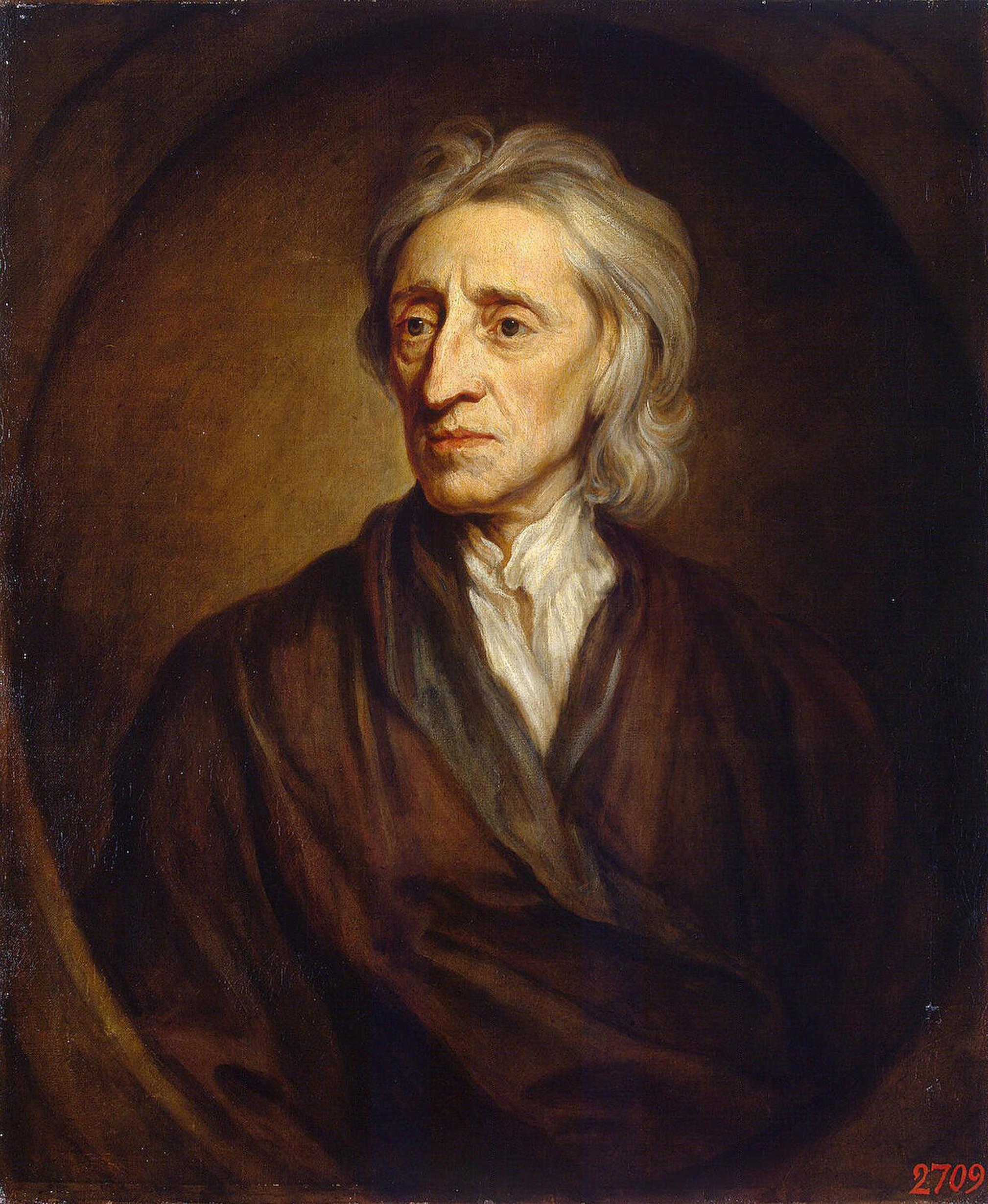
John Locke, portrait, 1697

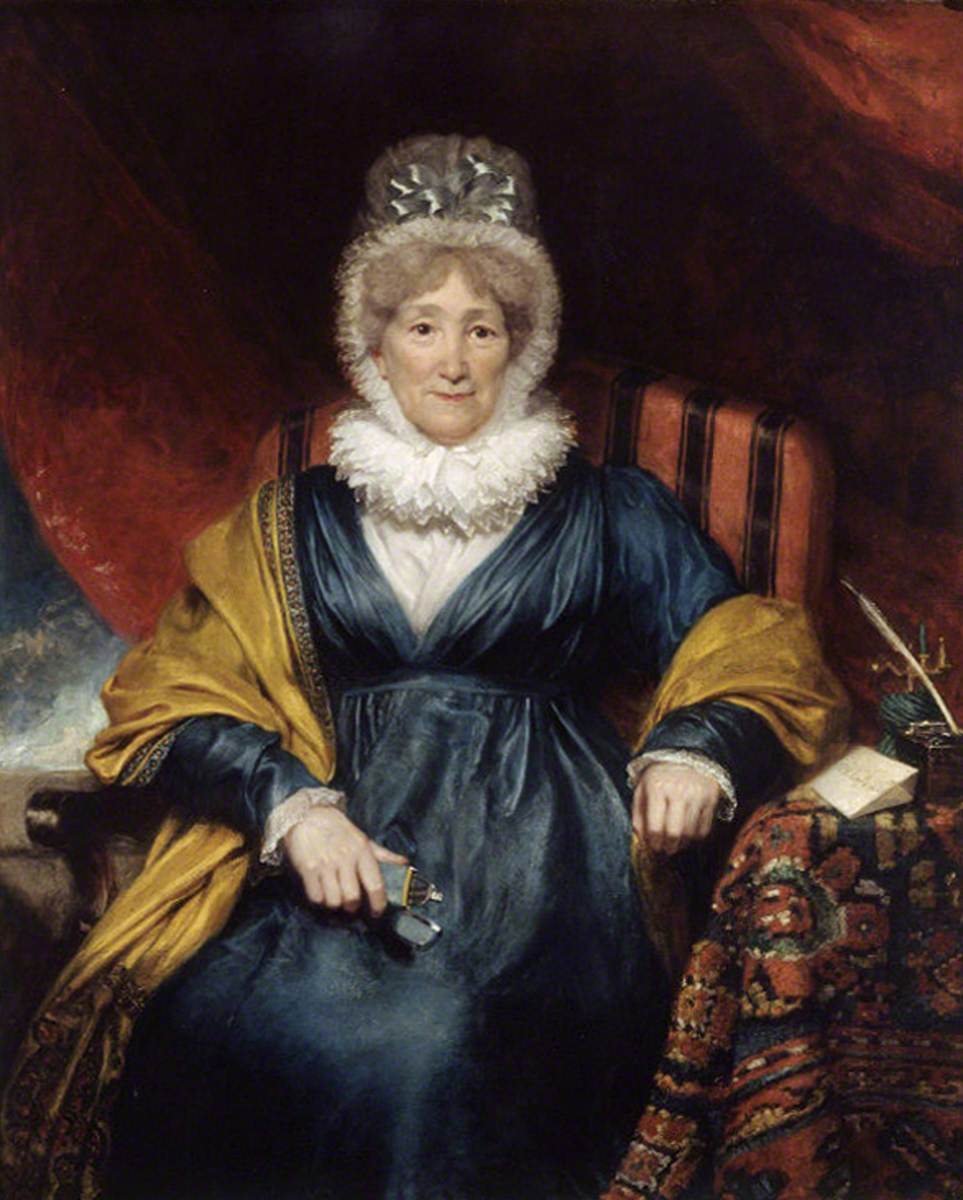
Hannah More, portrait, 1821

In birth order:

- Samuel Crooke (1575–1649), noted preacher and supporter of the Parliamentary cause in the English Civil War, was rector of Wrington for almost 50 years.
- Robert Carr, 1st Earl of Somerset (c. 1587 – 1645), politician and courtier.
- Francis Roberts (1607–1675), Puritan, librarian, scholar, and rector of Wrington from 1650-1675
- John Locke (1632–1704), philosopher, was born in Wrington.
- John Rogers (1679–1729), controversialist and cleric, rector of Wrington
- Samuel Wathen (c. 1720–1787), physician to Charlotte, wife of George III, died in Wrington.
- Henry Walton Smith (1738–1792), bookseller and newsagent, founded WH Smith, brought up in Wrington.
- Hannah More (1745–1833), who worked to improve conditions for miners and farmworkers in the Mendip Hills, bought a house in Paradise, near Cowslip Green, where she lived with her sister Martha until 1828. She spent her last five years in Clifton. She is buried at All Saints' Church, the family tomb being Grade II listed.
- William Leeves (1748-1828), poet and composer, friend of Hannah More, was rector from 1779-1828.
- Samuel Budgett (1794–1851), wholesale grocer, Wesleyan Methodist, philanthropist and subject of a popular biography.
- William Talbot Aveline (1822–1903), geologist and archaeologist, was brought up in Wrington.
- George Howell (1833–1911), a prominent trade unionist and reform campaigner.
- Henry Herbert Wills (1856–1922) who resided at Barley Wood, was a member of the WD & HO Wills tobacco family and a board member of the Imperial Tobacco Company, which took it over.
- Dame Mary Wills (c. 1861–1931) knighted for her philanthropy, resided at Wrington.
- Walford Davies (1869–1941), composer, Master of the King's Musick, died at Wrington.
- Howard A. Bell (1888–1974), pioneer of reservoir fly-fishing nymph techniques and artificial flies, lived in Wrington from 1935 to 1974.
- Frank Cousins (1904–1986), national trade union leader and Labour politician, lived in Ropers Lane in the 1970s.
- John Pilkington Hudson (1910–2007), horticultural scientist and bomb disposal expert, retired to the Spinney, Ladywell, Wrington, where he and his wife created a notable garden.

== Sports ==
Wrington Redhill AFC plays at the recreation ground in Wrington. It has a first team, reserve team and A team. The first team plays in the Erra Somerset County League in the premier division, the reserve in Weston super Mare and District League Division 1, and A team in the W&D division 4. The club badge is a gold rampant dragon (wyvern), matching the emblem on the unofficial Flag of Somerset. The club colours are green and black.

Wrington has two senior cricket teams. The first XI is in the North Somerset Cricket League Saturday Division 1, the second in Saturday Division 3. The club's limited overs team finished as runners-up in the league's Butcombe Brewery KO Cup. The club also has youth in the North Somerset Youth Cricket Leagues at the under 17, 15, 13 and 11 levels. The facilities and pitch have been improved in the last few years. Additionally, it now has two nets for training sessions for all ages and levels.
