= Church of All Saints, Wrington =

Church in Somerset, England

Church of All Saints
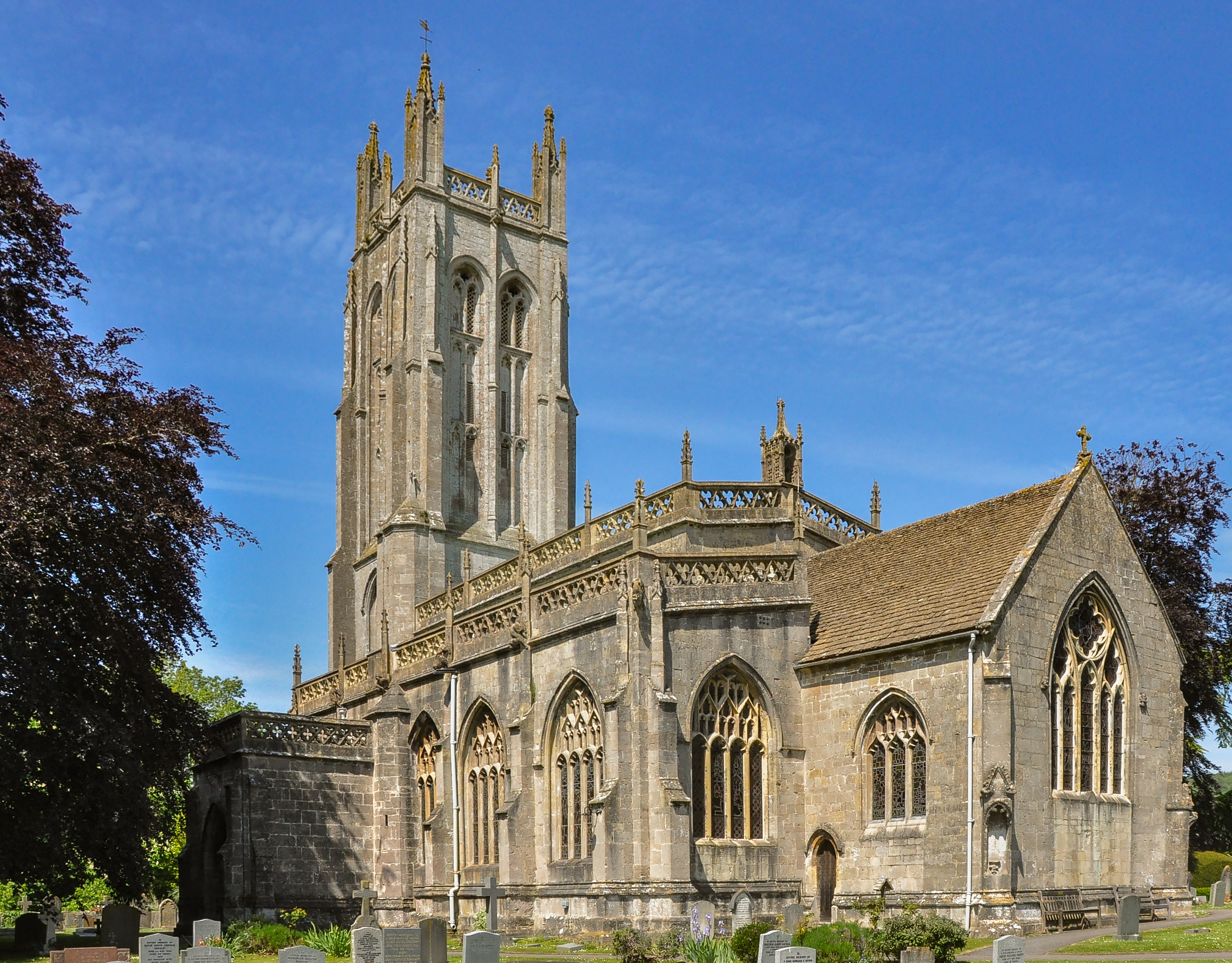
- All Saints, Wrington, Somerset, from the south-east
- Location: Wrington, Somerset, England
- Country: England
- Denomination: Church of England

History
- Founded: 13th century
- Dedication: All Saints

Architecture
- Functional status: Active
- Heritage designation: Grade I listed
- Designated: 2 February 1961
- Style: Decorated Gothic, Perpendicular Gothic
- Years built: 1300-1450

Administration
- Province: Canterbury
- Diocese: Bath & Wells
- Archdeaconry: Bath
- Deanery: Locking
- Benefice: Wrington with Butcombe and Burrington
- Parish: Wrington

The Church of All Saints is the Church of England parish church for the large village of Wrington, Somerset, England. There has been a church here since the 13th century, though much of the present building dates from the 15th century. Historic England have designated it a Grade I listed building.

== History ==
There are no records from either Glastonbury Abbey or locally as to any previous building before the 13th century. However, there is some surviving 13th-century work in the present building, mostly in the chancel, which is notably plainer in appearance than the nave, indicating its earlier age.

The church underwent a period of extensive remodelling and expansion from 1420 to 1450, including rebuilding the nave and aisles and constructing the large west tower. The chancel was also modified in this period, which involved widening the western face of the existing chancel to fit the new, larger nave. The former line of the roof ridge can still be seen where the nave meets the tower arch from within.

Major restoration of the church took place from 1859 to 1860, which involved plastering and stuccoing the previously whitewashed walls, the medieval pews removed and replaced, the gallery installed across the tower arch was removed, removing the piscina from the chancel, removing the monuments in the church, moving the organ to underneath the tower vaulting, covering the floor of the chancel with tiles, adding a new font and adding clerestory windows to the nave. The present east window was also installed in this restoration, as a copy of the previous 13th-century work. Barrel vaulting also was installed in the chancel at this time. The tower was restored in 1948.

In 2017, a major reordering and restoration of the church interior took place, undertaken jointly by Benjamin & Beachamp Architects and Ellis & Co. This restoration, taking some 8 months, involved lifting the church floor, improved the draining, and relaying it with underfloor heating and new stone. Masonry throughout the church was cleaned, wiring and plumbing was overhauled, and the timber ceilings were conserved by removing centuries of dust and wax and gilding the decorative elements. Some pews were also removed, and the floor was lowered. The first service in the church following the work was held on Palm Sunday, 2017.

== Architecture ==
=== Exterior ===
The principal feature of the exterior of the church is the tall west tower, which rises to 113.5 feet (35 metres) high at the pinnacles, and was described in 1851 by Edward Augustus Freeman as one of the "highest achievements of architectural genius". The tower is formed of four stages, including a tall belfry which rises through the upper two stages, common with other towers of the Long panel generation like St Cuthbert, Wells and St Peter, Evercreech. A stair turret rises in the south-east corner of the tower. At the four corners are the square turrets carrying the main corner pinnacles, which each bear four smaller angle pinnacles. The large west door at the base of the tower contains tracery and heraldry in the spandrels.

Sir Charles Barry, one of the two main architects for the Houses of Parliament in London, was said to have used Wrington's tower as inspiration for the Victoria Tower.

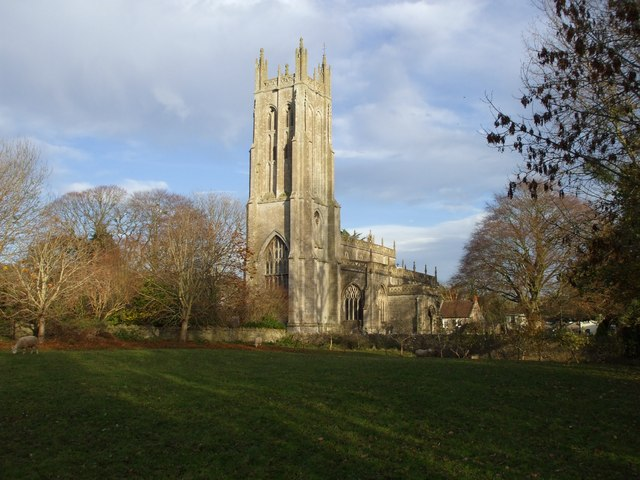
The tower from the west.

The nave, clerestory, aisles and south porch date from the 15th century and are Perpendicular Gothic in style. The clerestory has windows of three lights whilst the aisle windows are of four lights. Surmounting both aisles and clerestory is a parapet pierced by trefoils, matching that on the tower. The south porch also has a stair turret in its south east corner. The parapet on the porch differs from that upon the remainder of the church, being of pierced quatrefoil design. The eastern gable of the nave features an elaborate bell-cot, in which hangs a small sanctus bell.

The aisles, which are of the same design as the nave, extend beyond the eastern wall of the nave, approximately halfway into the chancel. Both aisles terminate in large four-light windows.

The chancel is lower and plainer than that of the nave, featuring a steeper, tiled roof rather than the taller but shallower roof of the nave. In the buttresses on the eastern gable of the chancel are two well-decorated Perpendicular niches which once contained statues.

There are numerous gargoyles placed on the exterior of the church.

=== Interior ===
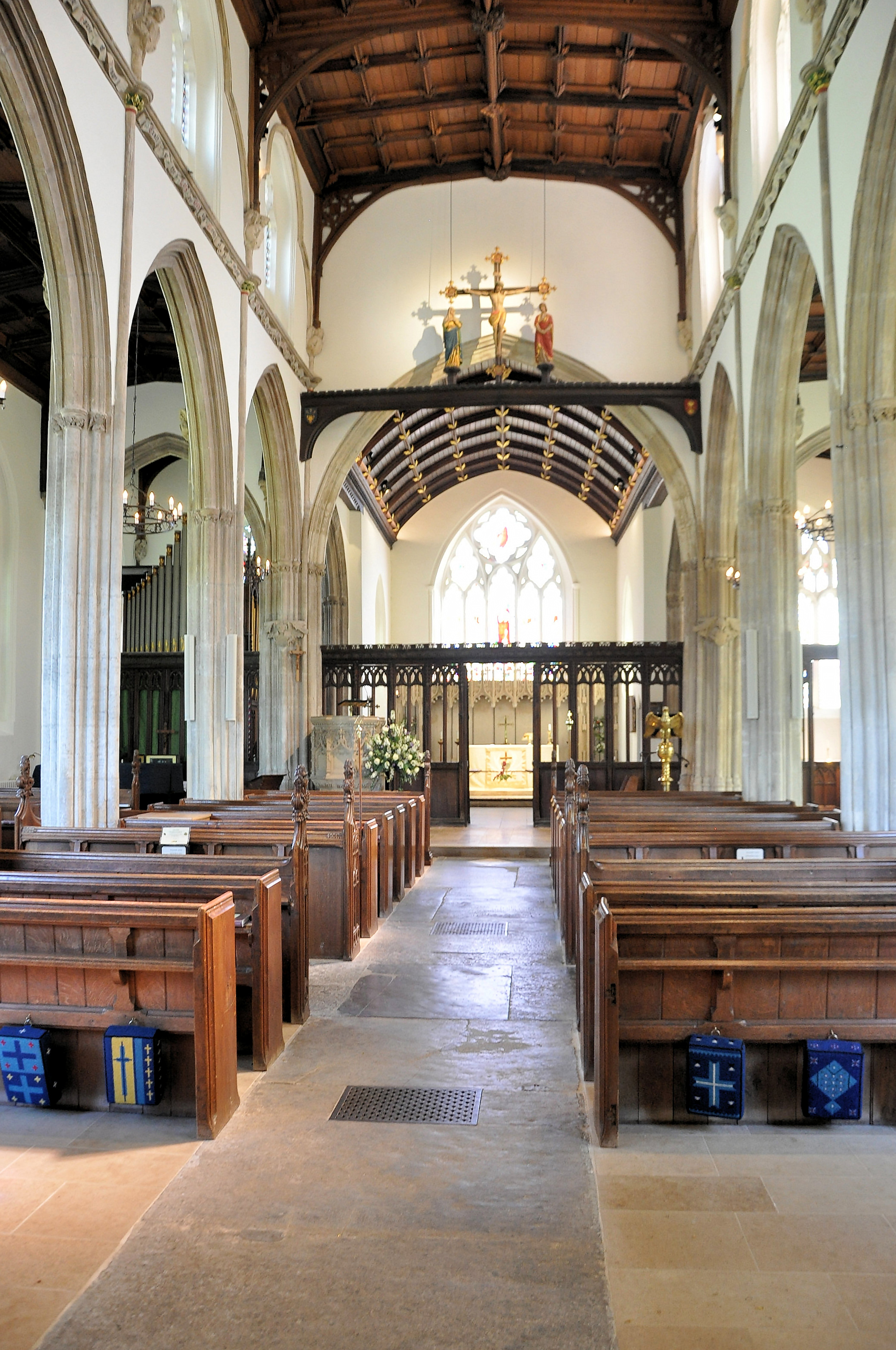
The nave, looking east.

Though the nave is relatively short, being only four bays in length, it is tall, which adds to the sense of scale and space. The nave arcade is lofty, on top of which is the clerestory, and above that a fine tie-beam timber roof. The roof is supported on corbels that project outwards from the clerestory walls. The line of the former nave roof can still be seen etched on the tower arch. The tower is lit by a large five-light stained glass window, above which is a highly decorative fan vault, a hallmark of the Perpendicular style. The nave itself is lit by four large four-light windows in each aisle and the three-light clerestory windows.

The chancel has a much-restored barrel vault, featuring gilded bosses. There is a fine 16th-century rood screen separating the nave and chancel as well as a 15th-century marble font in the nave. The chancel has a 19th-century stone reredos by Charles Barry.

There are numerous monuments in the church, including stone busts to John Locke and Hannah More dating from the early 19th century, both in the south porch. There is also a small chained library.

=== Materials ===
Externally, the church is built from stone from nearby Felton, ashlar and Doutling stone. Internally, the roof and pews are made from oak, and the new floor installed in 2017 is paved with Jurassic Purbeck Blend, a form of limestone from quarries in the Purbeck Hills. The pulpit is made from Caen stone, taken from quarries in north-western France.

== Organ ==
As part of the Victorian restoration of 1859–1860, a new organ was placed in the space underneath the fan vault of the tower. This was the first time since the 17th century the church had an organ, the previous instrument being destroyed some 200 years prior in 1644. This organ was made by J. W. Walker & Sons of London in 1859 and was contained in a case some 10 feet (3 metres) wide and 14 feet (4 metres) high. In 1880, this organ was moved from underneath the tower to the lady chapel and was enlarged at the same time, also by Walker & Sons. The expansion included adding an additional coupler and increasing the number of pedals.

In 1976, the instrument was expanded again, this time by Percy Daniel of Clevedon. It was further expanded between 1986 and 1994 by R. D. Taylor of Burrington. In 2021, a fundraising campaign was launched to raise £50,000 to restore the organ.

== Bells ==
The earliest record of bells at Wrington is the present sanctus bell which hangs in the bell-cot. It dates from circa 1510 and was cast by Thomas Geffries, likely in Bristol. The earliest mention of bells in the main tower is from the 16th century, when it is known that the tower contained four bells. These four bells were hung in a large timber frame, some 10 feet (3 metres) high, and were likely hung for swinging or chiming.

In 1611, Roger Purdue of Salisbury bell foundry was employed by the churchwardens to cast a new treble bell, thus augmenting the ring to five. The new bell weighed approximately 588 kg. This bell was likely cast in or near the churchyard, as was common at the time. Ten years later, in 1621, Roger Purdue was contracted again, this time to recast the fourth bell, which had developed a crack. Purdue returned again in 1628 to recast the 3rd and tenor bells, at a cost of £20.

In 1703, the tenor bell was recast again, this time by Abraham Rudhall of Gloucester. It is recorded in the church accounts the bell was transported to and from Gloucester for recasting, rather than in the churchyard, showing the improved road conditions of the day. In 1712, the third was recast, this time by Edward Bilbie of Chew Stoke. The 1712 recast is the oldest surviving bell in the tower today, forming the present ninth of the ring of ten.

Major remodelling took place in 1750 when Thomas Bilbie I made the 1712 third bell of the ring of five, the new fourth of a ring of five. All of the other bells, the treble, second, fourth and tenor were taken to Chew Stoke and recast, and an additional treble was added, to make a ring of six. The new tenor bell weighed 33 and a quarter hundredweight (1,676 kg). Following this remodelling, the bells were rehung for change ringing, rather than swinging or chiming, as they had been. Just seventeen years later, the 3rd bell was recast, again by Thomas Bilbie I.

In 1845, the treble and tenor were both recast, this time being taken to Charles and George Mears' foundry at Whitechapel, London, from nearby Yatton railway station. In 1891, the repairs to the old oak bell frame in which the bells hung were conducted by James Barwell of Birmingham at a cost of £96. In 1895, the canons were removed from the tenor, reducing its weight to 37 hundredweight and 13 pounds (1,885 kg). Despite the church accounts showing regular expenditure repairing and maintaining the bells, they were difficult to ring, as it took two men to ring the tenor.

In 1911, all six bells were sent to Mears & Stainbank of London, the predecessor to the modern Whitechapel foundry, for retuning, rehanging and augmentation to ten bells. The original six bells were retuned and rehung in a new two-tier cast iron bell frame with four new treble bells. The new two-tier frame featured five bells on the upper tier, and five bells on the lower tier, due to the narrow width of the tower. After retuning, the tenor assumed its present weight of 36 and a half hundredweight (1,863 kg).

Further work on the bells took place throughout the 20th century, including numerous repairs and alterations to the clappers in 1945, 1951, 1965, 1977 and 1978. In 1930, the fifth bell (the treble of the original six, dating from the 1750 remodelling) cracked, and was recast by Mears & Stainbank at their Whitechapel foundry. In 1978, all ten bells were rehung on ball bearings, replacing the previous plain bearings installed in 1911, at a cost of £4,000. In 1985, the sixth bell cracked and was taken to the Whitechapel Bell Foundry to be recast.

In 2011, major maintenance took place, which involved overhauling the clappers, bearings and pulleys, and work to improve the roping of the bells, as well as painting all of the framework and fittings. This work was carried out by John Taylor & Co of Loughborough. Since then, the bells have had no major attention. They are amongst the heaviest rings in Somerset, and are the fifth heaviest ringing peal of ten change ringing bells in the world, surpassed only by the bells of Wells Cathedral, Inveraray, Beverley Minster, and the tower of the former Imperial Institute in London.

=== Clock ===
There is a clock within the tower, dating back to its last restoration in 1870. The clock chimes the Westminster chimes every 15 minutes during the day. In 2012, a dispute broke out between the church and some local residents who complained the bells were disturbing them at night. North Somerset Council issued a noise abatement notice, stating the bells cannot chime between 11pm and 7am. Due to the lack of automated mechanism within the clock, which would have enabled the chimes to continue in the day whilst switching them off at night, the chimes were silenced completely. An agreement was reached between the church and the residents who complained, where the church clock only chimes hourly at night, rather than every fifteen minutes.

== See also ==
- List of Grade I listed buildings in North Somerset
- List of towers in Somerset
- List of ecclesiastical parishes in the Diocese of Bath and Wells
