= St John's Church, Warminster =

- Church of St John the Evangelist, Warminster
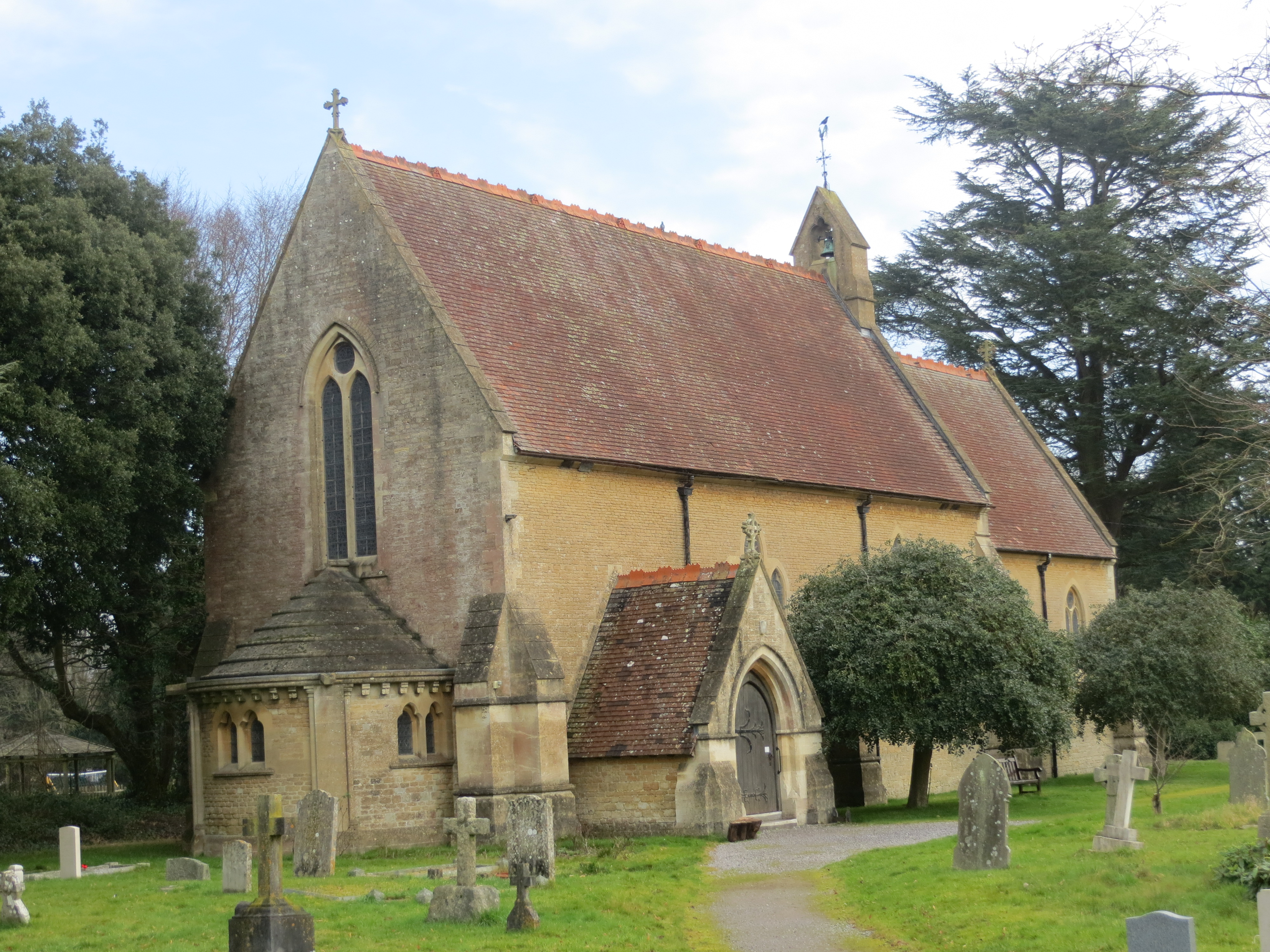
- St John's Church, Warminster
- 51°12′1.80″N 2°9′58.32″W
- OS grid reference: ST 88484 44601
- Location: 95 Boreham Road, Warminster, BA12 9JY
- Country: England
- Denomination: Church of England
- Churchmanship: High church
- Website: https://www.riverwerechurches.org/st-johns-church-boreham/

History
- Status: Church
- Dedication: John the Evangelist

Architecture
- Functional status: Active
- Heritage designation: Grade II*
- Designated: 31 March 1978
- Architect: George Edmund Street
- Style: Early English style with Gothic Revival elements
- Years built: 1865

Administration
- Province: Canterbury
- Diocese: Salisbury
- Archdeaconry: Sarum
- Deanery: Heytesbury
- Parish: Bishopstrow and Boreham

St John's Church, in full the Church of St John the Evangelist, is a Church of England church in the Boreham area in the south-east of the town of Warminster, Wiltshire, England. It was built in 1865 and is a Grade II* listed building.

== History and features ==
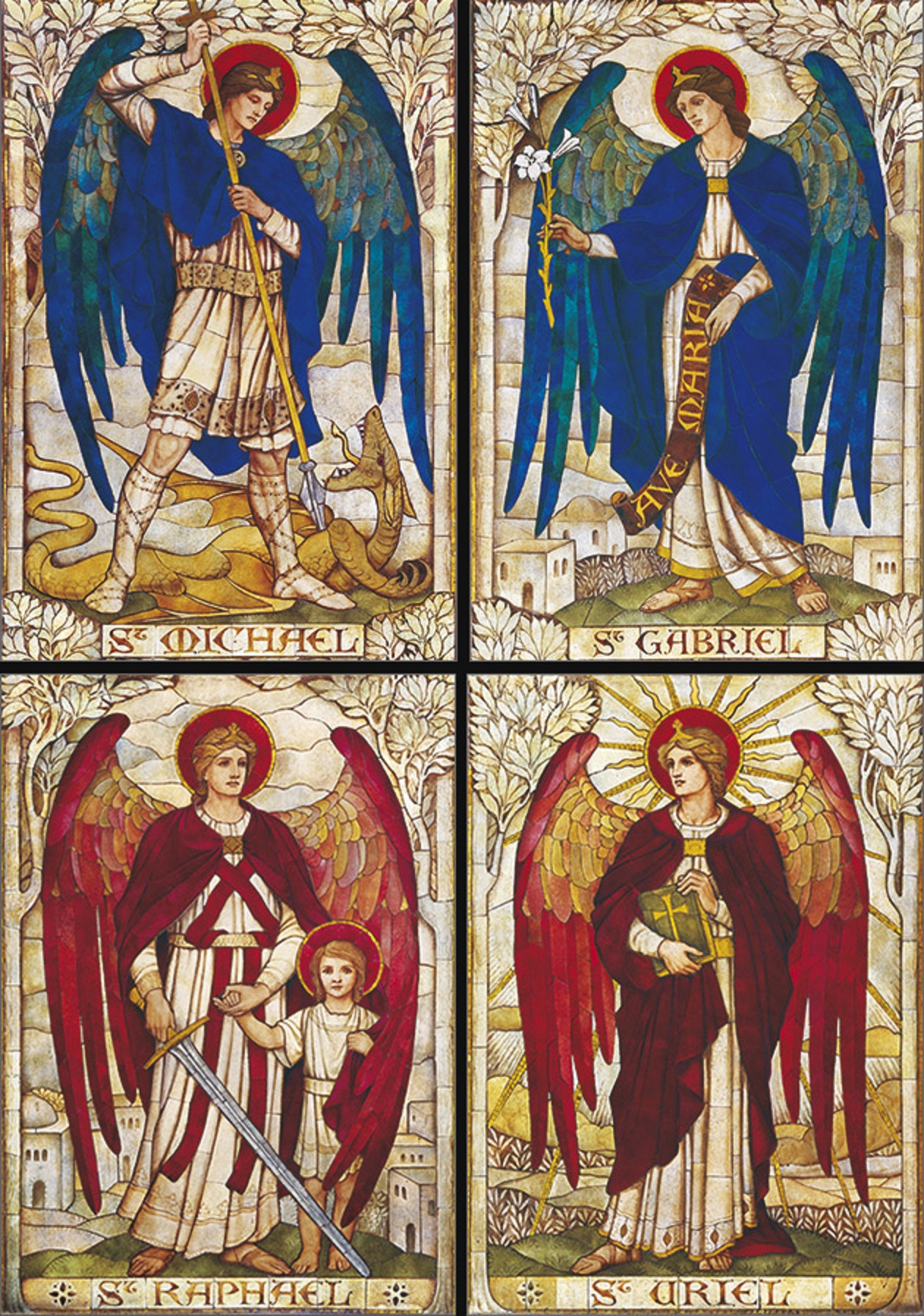
Mosaics of the four archangels on the east wall in the chancel

The church was begun in 1865 due to the overcrowding of the parish church of St Denys, and was completed in the same year. The site is about 3/4 mile (1.2 km) southeast of the town centre, in a field called Picked Acre alongside Boreham Road, which had been given by William Temple of Bishopstrow House in 1859. The Rev J. E. Phillips, vicar of St Denys', opened a building fund which in less than one year raised £2,700, an amount greater than the building's eventual cost of £1,935.

The church was designed by London architect George Edmund Street in 1864–1865, in Early English style. Given the relatively ordinary-looking exterior, the interior is quite unexpected. The tiling throughout, reredos, low chancel screen wall, font, pulpit, oak choir stalls and free-standing nave benches were completed before 1868. The reredos has a gabled centre with Crucifixion. The stained glass in the chancel was made by Clayton and Bell. The bellcote over the east end of the nave has one bell.

The mosaics and opus sectile murals of scriptural scenes on the wall were designed by Charles Ponting and painted by James Powell and Sons in 1911–1915. These striking turn-of-the-century images are matched by the mosaics of the four archangels on the east wall in the chancel, behind the reredos. A western baptistery was added by Ponting in 1925–1926. The church was recorded as Grade II* listed in 1978.

== Parish ==
St John's was built as a chapel-of-ease for St Denys' church. In 1956 the area around St John's was added to Bishopstrow parish, and that parish was renamed Bishopstrow and Boreham. A group ministry was established in 1974 to cover this parish, Upton Scudamore and the Warminster churches of St Denys and Christ Church; this continues today as the River Were benefice, although Christ Church is now separate.
