= Church of All Saints, Nunney =

Church in Somerset, England

Coordinates: 51.2099°N 2.3771°W

All Saints' Church, Nunney
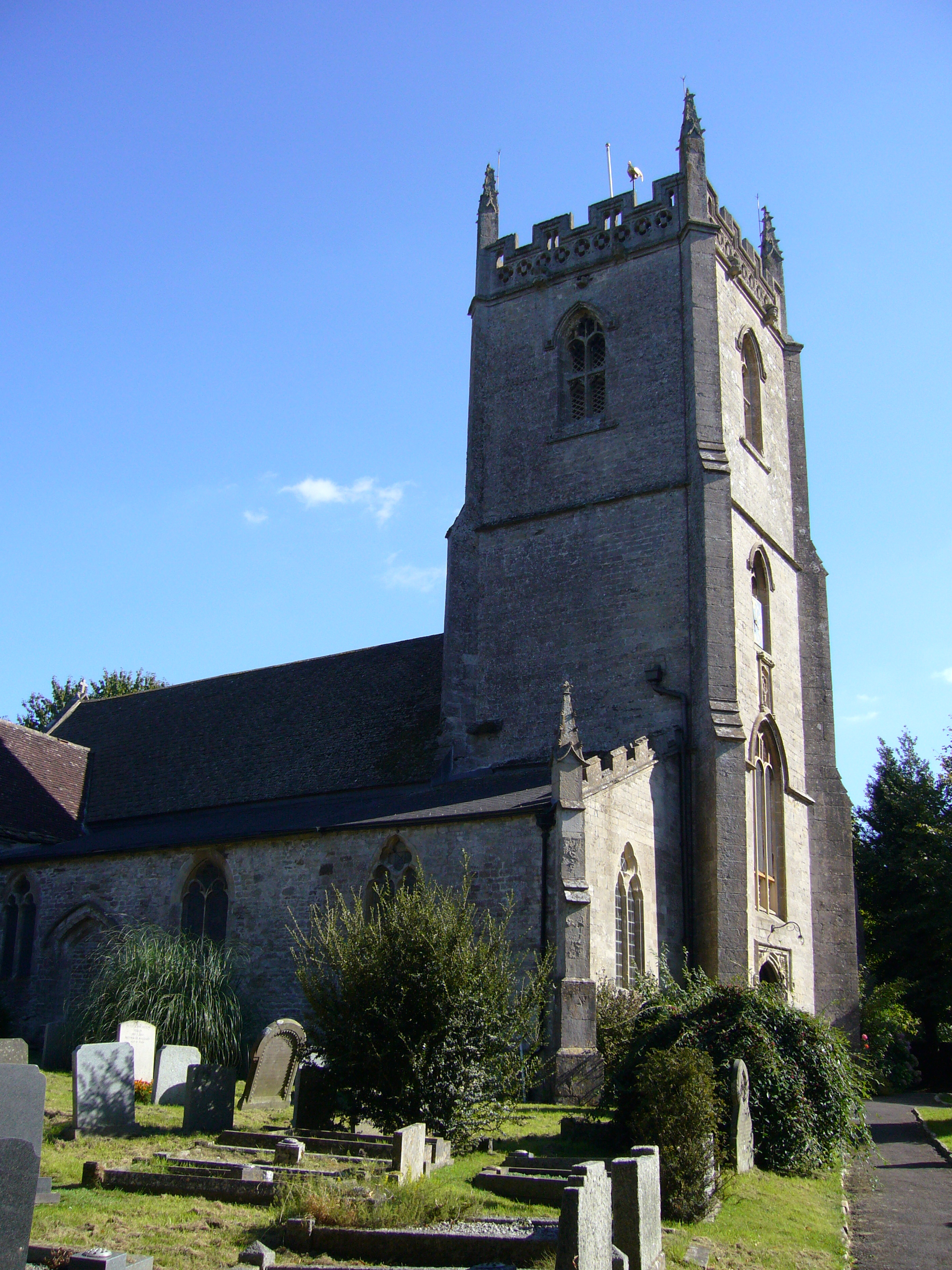
- All Saints' Church, Nunney
- Denomination: Church of England
- Churchmanship: High Church

History
- Dedication: All Saints

Administration
- Province: Canterbury
- Diocese: Bath & Wells
- Parish: Nunney

The Church of All Saints at Nunney, Somerset, England, is a Grade I listed building dating from the 12th century.

It was probably built on the site of an earlier Saxon or Norman church from which a Saxon cross and Norman font can still be seen. A 15th-century wagon or Barrel vault used to cover the nave however the timber rotted and it was demolished in 1957. A temporary roof was installed and hidden by a suspended ceiling. Plans are being drawn up to replace the roof and fundraising is under way.

Sir John Delamare and other lords of Nunney Castle are buried in the church.

The Anglican parish is part of the benefice of Postlebury within the archdeaconry of Wells.

== See also ==
- List of Grade I listed buildings in Mendip
- List of towers in Somerset
- List of ecclesiastical parishes in the Diocese of Bath and Wells
