= Christ Church, Warminster =

Christ Church
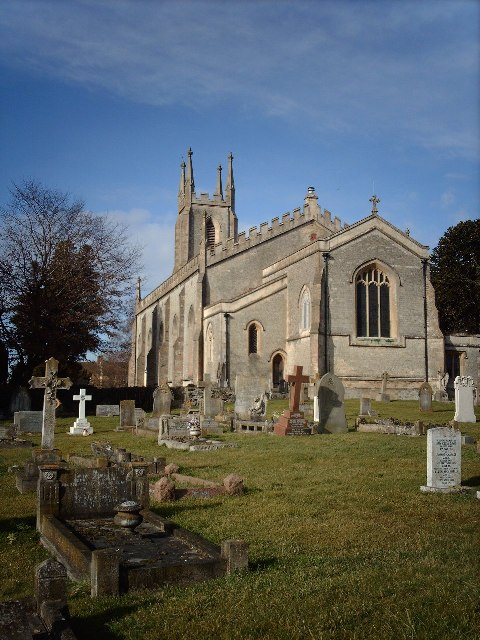

- Location in Wiltshire
- 51.1999°N 2.1863°W
- OS grid reference: ST 87073 44548
- Location: Deverill Road, Warminster
- Country: England
- Denomination: Church of England
- Website: ccww.org.uk

Architecture
- Functional status: Active
- Architect: John Leachman
- Style: Early English
- Years built: 1830–31

Administration
- Province: Canterbury
- Diocese: Salisbury
- Archdeaconry: Sarum
- Deanery: Heytesbury
- Parish: Christ Church

Listed Building – Grade II
- Reference no.: 1036199

Christ Church is an Anglican church building serving a parish on the southern side of Warminster, Wiltshire, England.

== History ==
The church was built in 1830–31 to the designs of John Leachman, at the instigation of William Dalby, vicar of the parish church of St Denys', as a chapel of ease to serve what was then Warminster Common. It was part-funded by the Church Building Commission and had a large nave with a capacity, including a gallery, of 882. The church is built in yellow brick with limestone dressings; the west tower has pinnacles described by Pevsner as tall and heavy.

In 1871 the church was expanded with the addition of the chancel and vestry designed by T.H. Wyatt. In 1881 the ceiling of the nave, which was becoming unstable, was replaced with wooden beams and pillars to form arcades, and the balcony or gallery was removed.

Christ Church before the 1871 addition of the chancel, and the 1881 changes to the interior

The building was designated as a Grade II listed building in 1952. During the late 1960s an attempt was made to modernise the worship in the church, and a nave altar was built. This was a controversial move and led, eventually, to a consistory court. The vicar wanted to symbolically bring the worship of the church to a more central place in the church. However, this move divided the church and a number of the congregation, and those outside the congregation complained that there had been no consultation. Eventually a parishioner appealed to an ecclesiastical consistory court. The case was lost by the vicar and church wardens as the court found that insufficient consultation about the change had occurred. Although the altar was not removed, the affair caused a rift in the church and a number of people felt strongly enough to move to worship elsewhere.

In 2004 a major redevelopment of Christ Church began with the complete reordering of the worship space, the addition of a raised dais, the removal of the nave altar and pews, and a new lobby. The second phase of the development project included the utilisation of the mezzanine floor area above the lobby of the church. Creating meeting rooms and more functional space, this work was completed in 2014.

== Parish ==
At first a chapel of ease within the parish of St Denys, in 1838 a district was assigned to Christ Church which included the Common, Boreham and part of the town. It gained its own parish in 1863, and at the same time Boreham was returned to Warminster parish. There were boundary changes affecting the parishes of Warminster, Christ Church, Bishopstrow and Boyton in 1956, and again involving Norton Bavant and Upton Scudamore in 1959; today the parish covers a segment of the southern half of Warminster, and extends southwest into part of the Longleat estate.

== List of vicars ==
Vicar	From
J. H. A. Walsh	1831
R. R. Hutton	1860
W. Hickman	1867
J. S. Stuart	1899
H. Lloyd-Jones	1941
H. G. Green	1943
R. A. Ford	1965
B. I. Abbott	1971
John C. Day	1977
Fred Woods	1981
Peter W. Hunter	1997
Lorraine Dobbins	2019
