= Beau Nash (novel) =

1879 novel

- Author: William Harrison Ainsworth
- Language: English
- Genre: Historical
- Publisher: Routledge
- Publication date: 1879
- Publication place: United Kingdom
- Media type: Print

Beau Nash is an 1879 historical novel by the British writer William Henry Harrison, originally published in three volumes by Routledge. It takes place in the eighteenth century in the spa town of Bath in Somerset. It focuses on the real-life figure Beau Nash who spent many years as master of ceremonies of the fashionable resort and the aristocrats who frequented Bath. Harrison had enjoyed a lengthy career stretching back several decades and had been one of the most popular authors during the early Victorian era. His books largely used historical settings such as the Georgian era portrayed in in. It was his penultimate novel, followed by Stanley Brereton in 1881.

== Bibliography ==
- Bragg, Tom. Space and Narrative in the Nineteenth-Century British Historical Novel. Taylor & Francis, 2016.
- Carver, Stephen James. The Life and Works of the Lancashire Novelist William Harrison Ainsworth, 1850–1882. Edwin Mellen Press, 2003.
- Worth, George John. William Harrison Ainsworth. Twayne Publishers, 1972.
