= Holwell Quarries =

Geological Site of Special Scientific Interest in Somerset, England

- Site of Special Scientific Interest
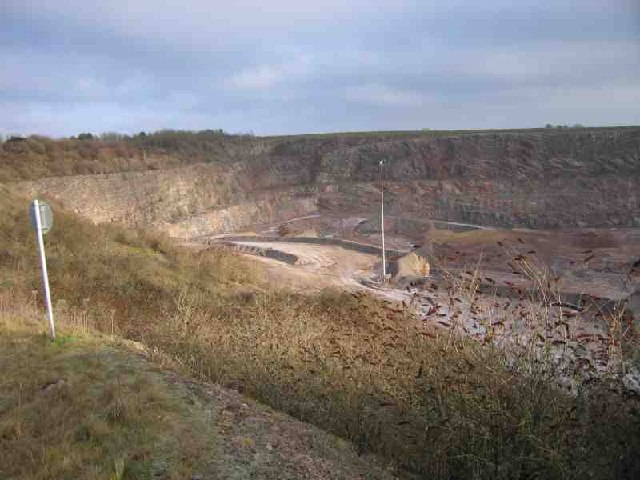

- Location within Somerset
- Location of Holwell Quarries.
- Area of search: Somerset
- Grid reference: ST726450
- Coordinates: 51.20355°N 2.39357°W
- Interest: Geological
- Area: 1.3 hectares (0.013 km^{2}; 0.0050 sq mi)
- Notification date: 1952

Holwell Quarries (grid reference ST726450) is a 1.3-hectare (3.2-acre) geological Site of Special Scientific Interest at Holwell near Nunney on the Mendip Hills in Somerset, notified in 1952.

Holwell Quarries represent an internationally important geological locality. A comprehensive assemblage of Triassic (including Rhaetic), Lower Jurassic and Middle Jurassic fissure fillings are well displayed. The Rhaetic fissure fillings have yielded the richest assemblage of vertebrate faunas known from the British Triassic. Fissure deposits have also yielded 8 or 9 genera of Reptiles: a Crocodilian, a Placodont (the first record in Britain of this sub-order), and the dinosaurs Thecodontosaurus and Palaeosaurus. The Lower Jurassic fissure fillings yield ammonites and brachiopods which are important in dating these deposits.

== See also ==
- Quarries of the Mendip Hills

== Sources ==
- English Nature citation sheet for the site (accessed 10 August 2006)
