= Upton Cow Down =

Protected area in Wiltshire, England

Coordinates: 51.24094°N 2.18045°W

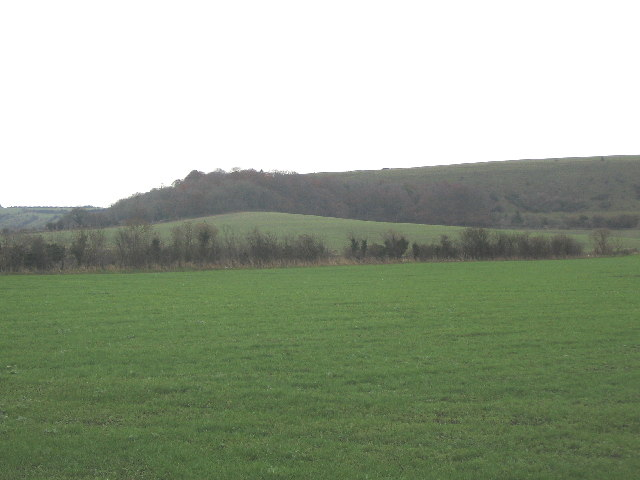
Upton Cow Down

Upton Cow Down (grid reference ST875491) is a 16.4 hectare biological Site of Special Scientific Interest in Wiltshire. The down is an area of chalk grassland on the western edge of Salisbury Plain. It lies one mile south of the town of Westbury, above the village of Upton Scudamore.

== Sources ==
- Natural England citation sheet for the site (accessed 25 May 2023)
