= Juliana Popjoy =

Partner of Beau Nash

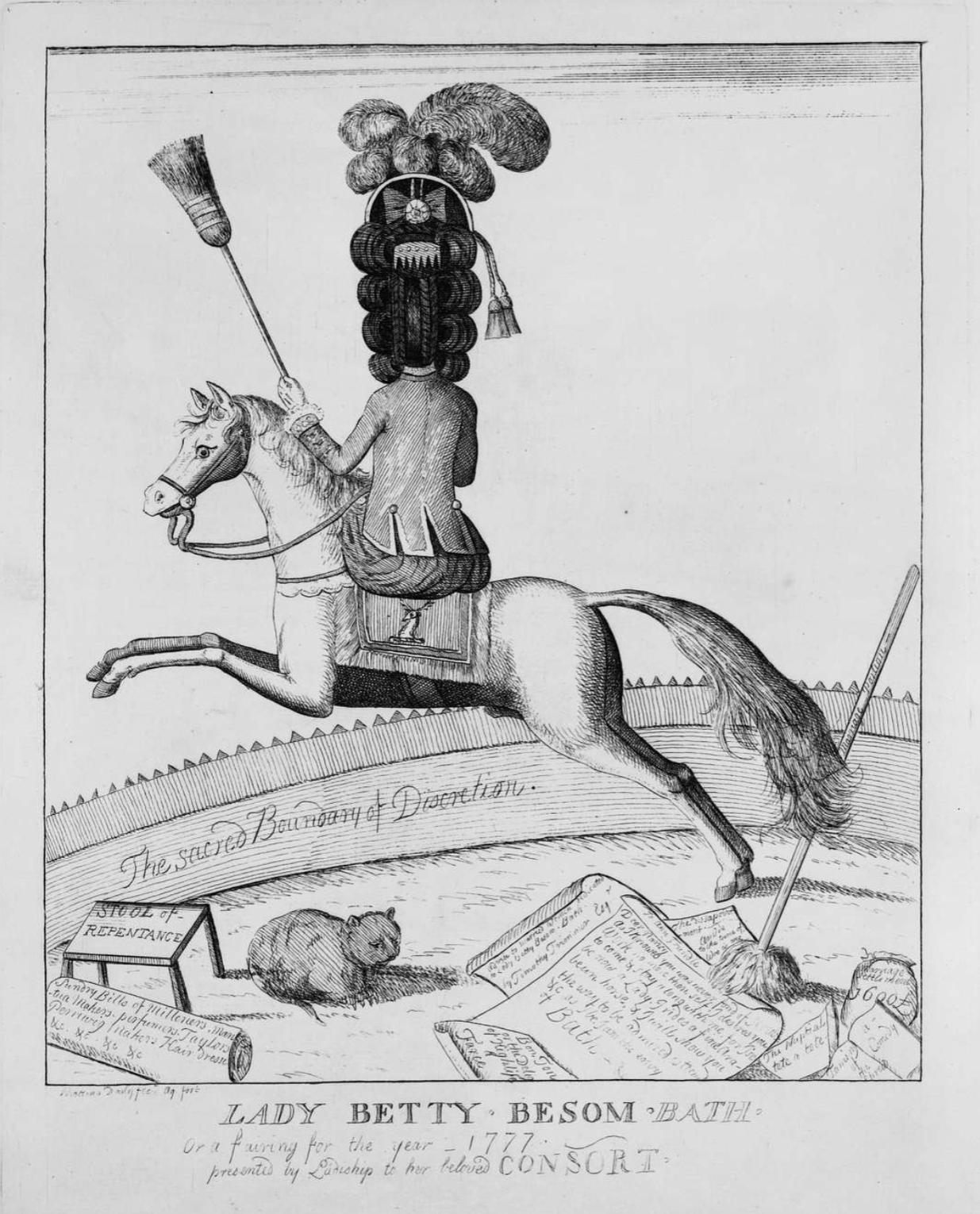
- Jumping over the "sacred boundary of discretion"
- Born: bapt. 1714; Bishopstrow, Wiltshire
- Died: 1777; Bishopstrow, Wiltshire
- Other name: "Lady Betty Besom"
- Known for: mistress of Beau Nash
- Partner: Beau Nash

Juliana Popjoy (c. 1710 – 1777) was the partner of Beau Nash, and was known as "Betty Besom". In later life, she was reputed to have lived in a tree. A cartoon of her jumping the "sacred boundary of discretion" dates from the year she died.

== Life ==
Popjoy was born in about 1710 in Bishopstrow, near Warminster in Wiltshire. She was baptised in 1714.

She became the mistress of Beau Nash, and was known as Lady Betty Besom, from the whip that she carried when riding, which had so many tails that it resembled a broom, which at the time was often called a besom. Eventually Nash ended the relationship. Nash was the self-appointed master of ceremonies in Bath.

She reportedly spent her last 30 or 40 years living inside a hollow tree within a mile of Warminster, although it was noted that she did visit cities like Bristol and Bath and nearby "gentlemen's houses". It was said that she had sworn to never sleep in a bed again, and she would sleep in barns or on the straw that she had placed within the tree that was her home.

Nash died in 1761 and was given a lavish funeral. In some accounts it is said that Popjoy had returned to him and cared for him in his final years, but there is no evidence to support this.

== Death and legacy ==
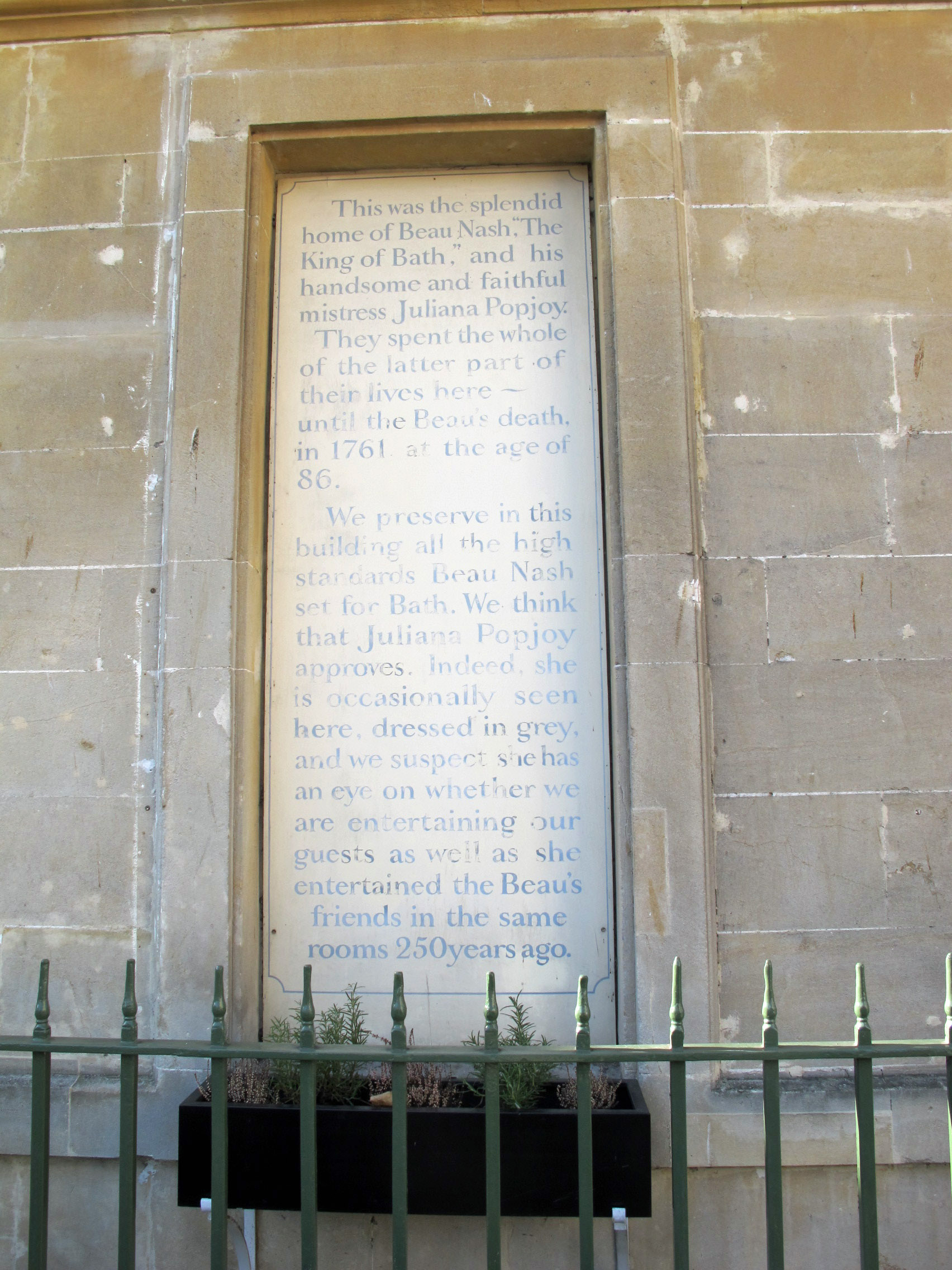
The plaque on her former house

At the end of her life, she returned to Bishopstrow where she died in 1777 at the reported age of 67. The same year, a cartoon was published showing her as "Lady Betty Besom" in a ridiculous wig, riding a dappled horse over the "sacred boundary of discretion". The cartoon by Matthew Darly shows her, holding her besom and leaving behind the broom of marriage, the stool of repentance and a pile of bills for milliners, hairdressers, outfitters etc. Her face isn't shown.

In 2003, Tomi Gretener ran a restaurant in Bath in the house that Popjoy and Nash had lived in, after Nash had to downsize because his debts had consumed his grand house. The house (now Grade II* listed) was built in 1720 next to what is now the Theatre Royal, and an inscription in a blind ground-floor window claims that Popjoy and Nash lived there until his death.
