= Beau Nash =

Welsh dandy and master of ceremonies at Bath (1674–1761)

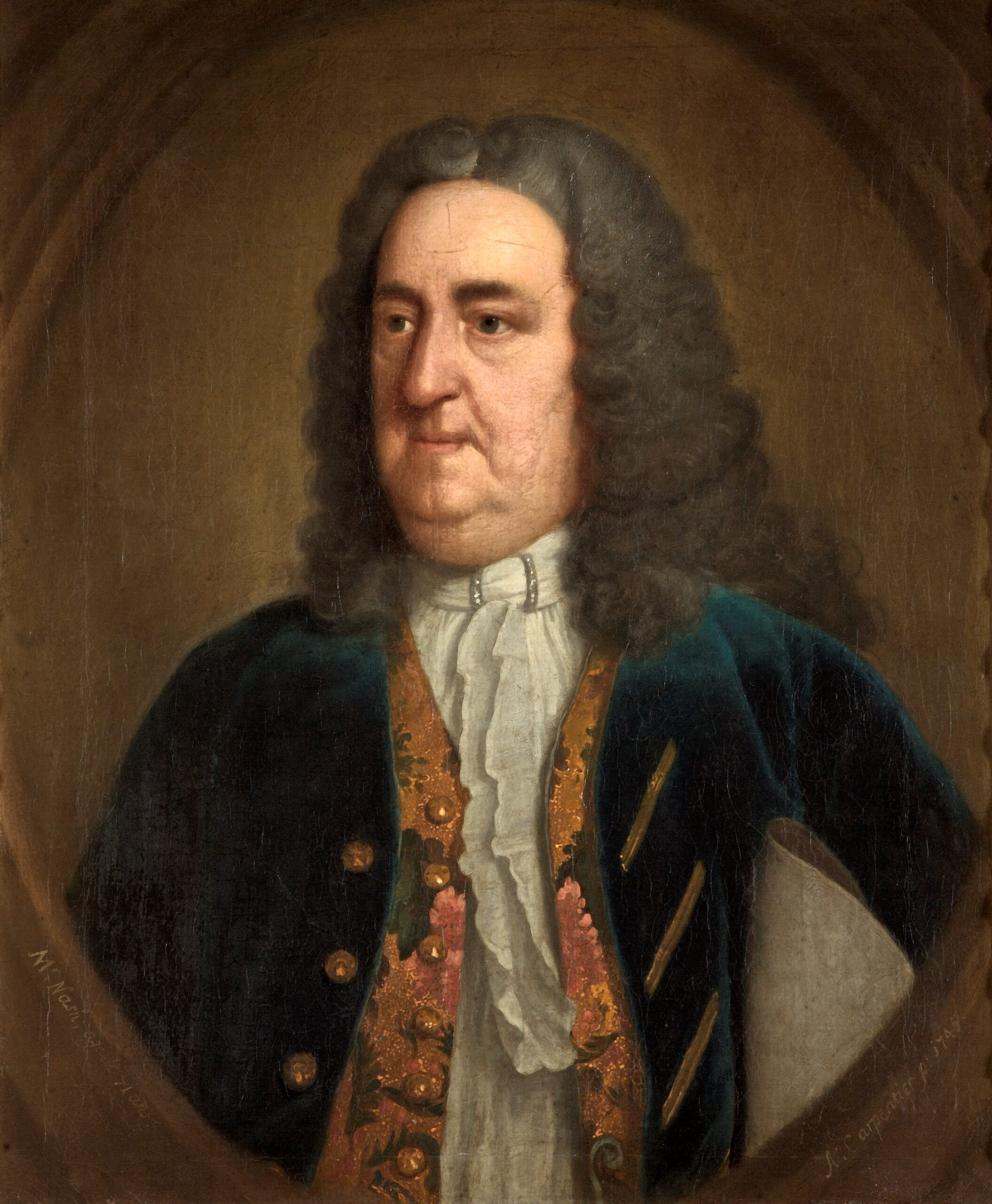
Portrait by Adrien Carpentiers, 1745

Richard "Beau" Nash (18 October 1674 – 3 February 1761) was a Welsh dandy who played a leading role in 18th-century British fashion. He is best remembered as the master of ceremonies at the spa town of Bath, Somerset.

== Biography ==
Nash was born in St Mary's Street, Swansea, Wales, in 1674. His father, Richard, a native of Pembroke, had risen to be partner in a glass-works at Swansea, which – although he was "of modest means" – gave him the means to pay for his son's education. Nash's mother was a niece of the Welsh merchant John Poyer, who became mayor of Pembroke town and served during the English Civil War. The Nash family were "known" in the countryside, but the Poyer family was of "gentler blood". Nash's comparatively obscure origins were sometimes the subject of comment; when the Duchess of Marlborough mentioned the subject, Nash replied "Madam, I seldom mention my father in company, not because I have any reason to be ashamed of him, but because he has some reason to be ashamed of me."

After attending Queen Elizabeth Grammar School at Carmarthen, he went up to Jesus College, Oxford, leaving without a degree. His father then bought him an officer's commission in the British Army, but he found the demands on his time too great, and instead opted to become a barrister, for which profession he had originally been intended. He entered as a student of the Middle Temple in 1693, where he was known for "good manners... his taste in dress, and... leading so gay a life" without any obvious source of wealth that his friends suspected him to be a highwayman. He was selected from amongst the students there to take charge of the Middle Temple's long-customary pageant for a new king, exhibited before King William III in 1695. His success led to the offer of knighthood, which he declined on the grounds of his lack of fortune. It was said that later Queen Anne again offered him a knighthood, but that he again refused the honour.

In 1704, Nash became Master of Ceremonies at the rising spa town of Bath, a position he retained until he died. He lived in a house on Saw Close (now at the main entrance to the Theatre Royal), and kept a string of mistresses. He played a leading role in making Bath the most fashionable resort in 18th-century England.

His position was unofficial, but nevertheless he had extensive influence in the city until early 1761, including regulating gambling. He managed and paid the musicians at the balls, giving him control of the events; he matched ladies with dancing partners at them; and even brokered marriages. He met new arrivals to Bath and judged whether they were suitable to join the select "Company' of 500 to 600 people who had pre-booked tables, escorted unaccompanied wives, and restrained compulsive gamblers and warned players against risky games or cardsharps. He was notable for encouraging a new informality in manners, breaking down the rigid barriers which had previously divided the nobility from the middle-class patrons of Bath, and even from the gentry.

The Corporation of the city funded an elaborate funeral for Nash, and he was buried in the nave of Bath Abbey, not far from where a memorial was raised to him in 1790.

Nash was a notorious gambler who was forced to move in with his mistress, Juliana Popjoy, because of his debts. Upon their separation, Popjoy was so distraught that she spent the majority of her remaining days living in a large hollowed-out tree. Shortly before her death, she moved out of the tree and back to her birth home, where she died.

His death caused quite a stir at the time, with the celebrated author Oliver Goldsmith being moved to write The Life of Richard Nash as early as 1762.

== Nash and Wesley ==
In his journal and letters, John Wesley, preacher and founder of Methodism, tells of a confrontation with Nash in Bath in 1739. According to his own account, Wesley's journey to Bath had been expected for some time, and Nash had made public his determination to confront him. Wesley proceeded to Bath, even though some people, afraid of the outcome, tried to talk him out of it. When Wesley began his preaching, there was "a much larger audience, among whom were many of the rich and great."

Facing Wesley, Nash questioned his authority, comparing the gathering to a conventicle, which was banned by Act of Parliament. Wesley answered that he had the authority of Jesus Christ and the Archbishop of Canterbury and that the gathering was not seditious and therefore did not contravene the Act. Nash complained that Wesley was scaring people out of their wits, but then admitted that he had never actually heard Wesley preach and was just relying on "common report". Wesley rejected this argument, stating that he did not judge Nash "by common report... it is not enough to judge by." When Nash asked why people were coming to the meeting at all, an old woman in the crowd asked Wesley to allow her to answer. She then told Nash that, while he took care of his body, she and others were present in order to take care of their souls. Nash left. Wesley wrote that, after his departure, "We immediately began praying for him, and then for all the despisers. As we returned, they hollowed and hissed us along the streets; but when any of them asked, 'Which is he' and I answered, 'I am he,' they were immediately silent."

== Beau Nash and Tunbridge Wells ==
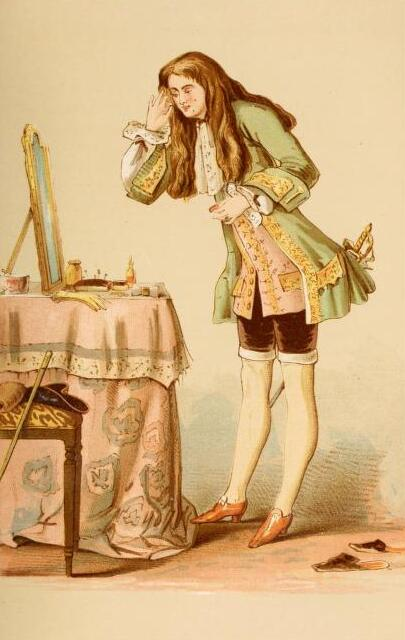
1886 illustration of Nash as a young man

In 1735, Nash appointed himself Master of Ceremonies in Tunbridge Wells and retained control of the entertainments provided for visitors until his death in 1761. Bath, it was said, was his kingdom, and Tunbridge Wells a colony of that kingdom. Nash had been interested in taking control at Tunbridge Wells for some years, but had been excluded by the formidable Bell Causey, who "presided as absolute governess" until her death in 1734. As well as organising entertainments, Nash established strict rules for correct behaviour. In order to ensure that visitors paid subscriptions for services provided, he introduced Sarah Porter, "Queen of the Touters", who eagerly pursued defaulters. Under Nash, Tunbridge Wells attained the height of its fame as a fashionable resort, patronised by royalty, nobility, and the most famous names in the country. There is a pub in Tunbridge Wells named after Nash, whilst The Ragged Trousers exhibits a plaque on the exterior of the building in his honour.

== Later use of name ==
A cinema was erected in Westgate Street in Bath in 1920 and named the Beau Nash Picture House in memory of Nash. The building, now Grade II listed, is currently known as Komedia.

== In popular culture ==
The 1879 novel Beau Nash by William Harrison Ainsworth is based around his life in Bath. In 1999, BBC Radio 4 broadcast a six-part comedy series entitled King of Bath, written by Arnold Evans and starring David Bamber as Nash, detailing fictitious adventures and mis-adventures of Nash while in Bath. The series has since been re-broadcast on BBC Radio 7 and BBC Radio 4 Extra.

Nash's life and death are major plot elements in the 2017 detective novel Beau Death by Peter Lovesey. The book includes a fictitious Beau Nash Society consisting of prominent citizens of Bath.

A grandson is portrayed in the comedic historical novel Belle Nash and the Bath Soufflé by William Keeling.

== External links and sources ==
- John Eglin, The Imaginary Autocrat: Beau Nash and the Invention of Bath, Profile, 2005. ISBN 1-86197-302-0 [reviewed by Timothy Mowl in the Times Literary Supplement, 8 July 2005, p. 32]
- The Life of Beau Nash by Oliver Goldsmith
- "Nash, Richard" . New International Encyclopedia. 1905.
- Newspaper article announcing the death of Juliana Popjoy, March 1777
