= Herbert Holmes à Court =

Vice-Admiral The Honourable Herbert Holmes à Court
- Born: 16 February 1869
- Died: 21 October 1934 (aged 65)
- Military career
- Allegiance: United Kingdom
- Branch: Royal Navy
- Service years: 1883–1918
- Rank: Vice-Admiral
- Commands: HMS Leander, HMS Sapphire; HMS Revenge; HMS St Vincent; Royal Naval College, Osborne

Vice-Admiral Herbert Edward Holmes à Court (16 February 1869 – 21 October 1934) was an officer of the Royal Navy. His commands included HMS Revenge, HMS St Vincent, and the Royal Naval College, Osborne.

== Early life ==
Holmes à Court was the fifth of the seven sons of William Leonard Holmes à Court (1835—1885), a Deputy Lieutenant of the Isle of Wight and the eldest son and heir of William à Court-Holmes, 2nd Baron Heytesbury. His mother was a cousin of the Heytesbury family, Isabella Sophia, daughter of the Rev. Richard à Court Beadon, Vicar of Cheddar, Somerset, and a grand-daughter of Annabella à Court, sister of the first Lord Heytesbury. His six brothers included the third and fourth Lords Heytesbury, and he also had three sisters.

Born at Codford St Peter, his early years were spent around Heytesbury in Wiltshire, and in July 1882, aged thirteen, he joined the Royal Navy training ship HMS Britannia at Dartmouth.

== Naval career ==
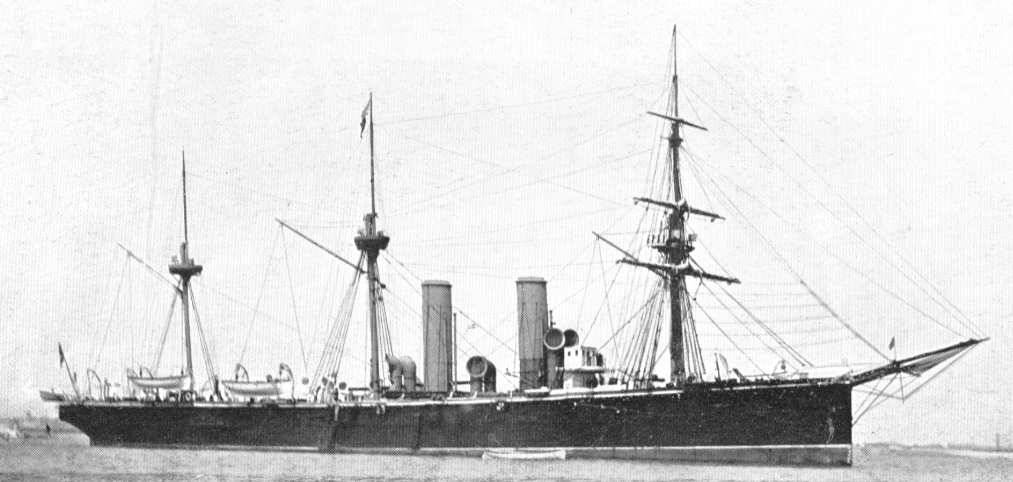
Holmes à Court's first command, HMS Leander

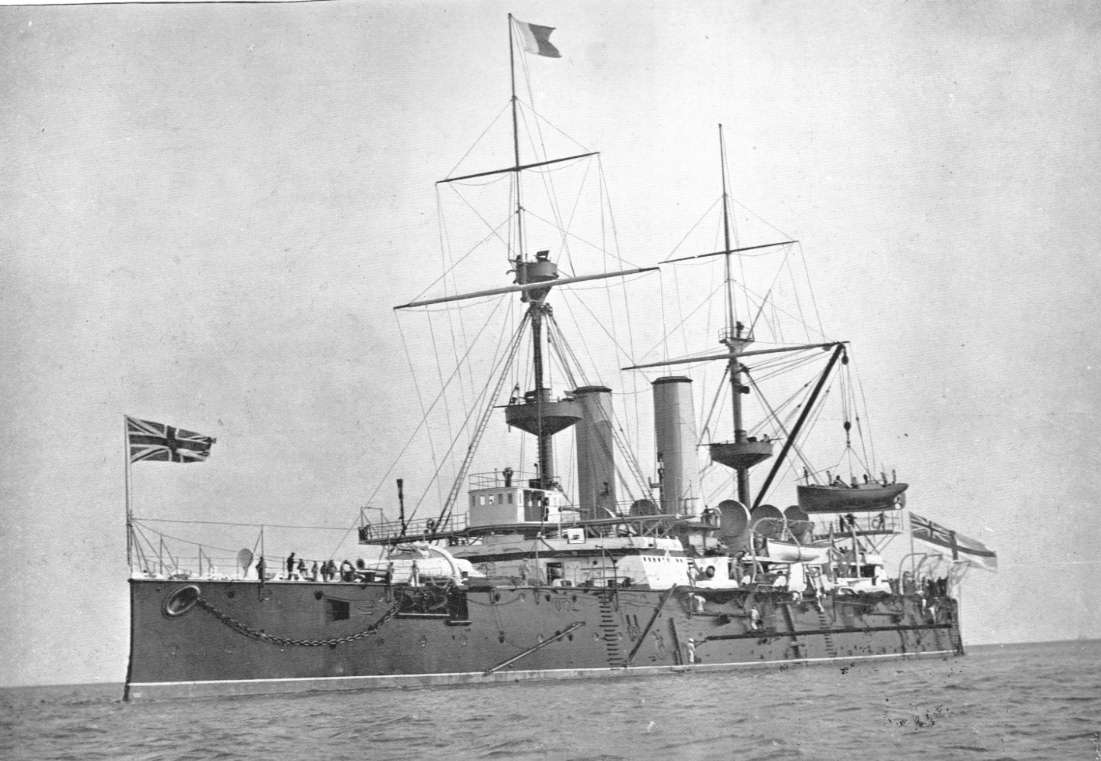
HMS Revenge

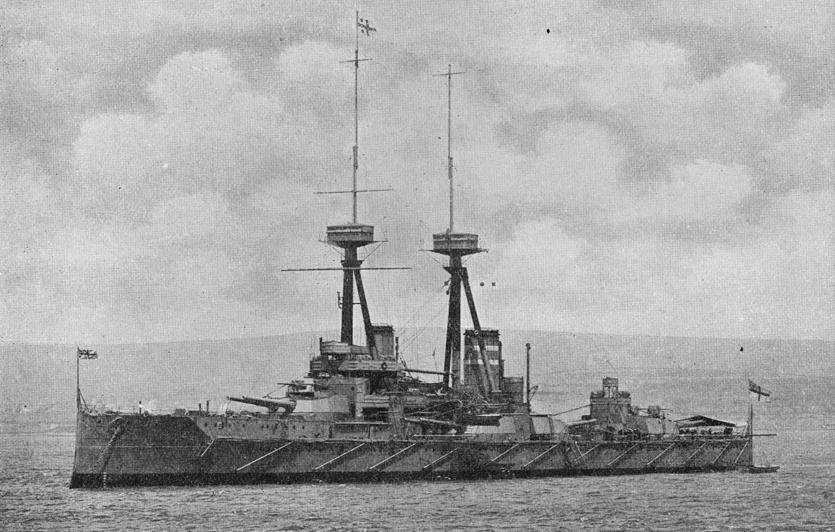
HMS St Vincent

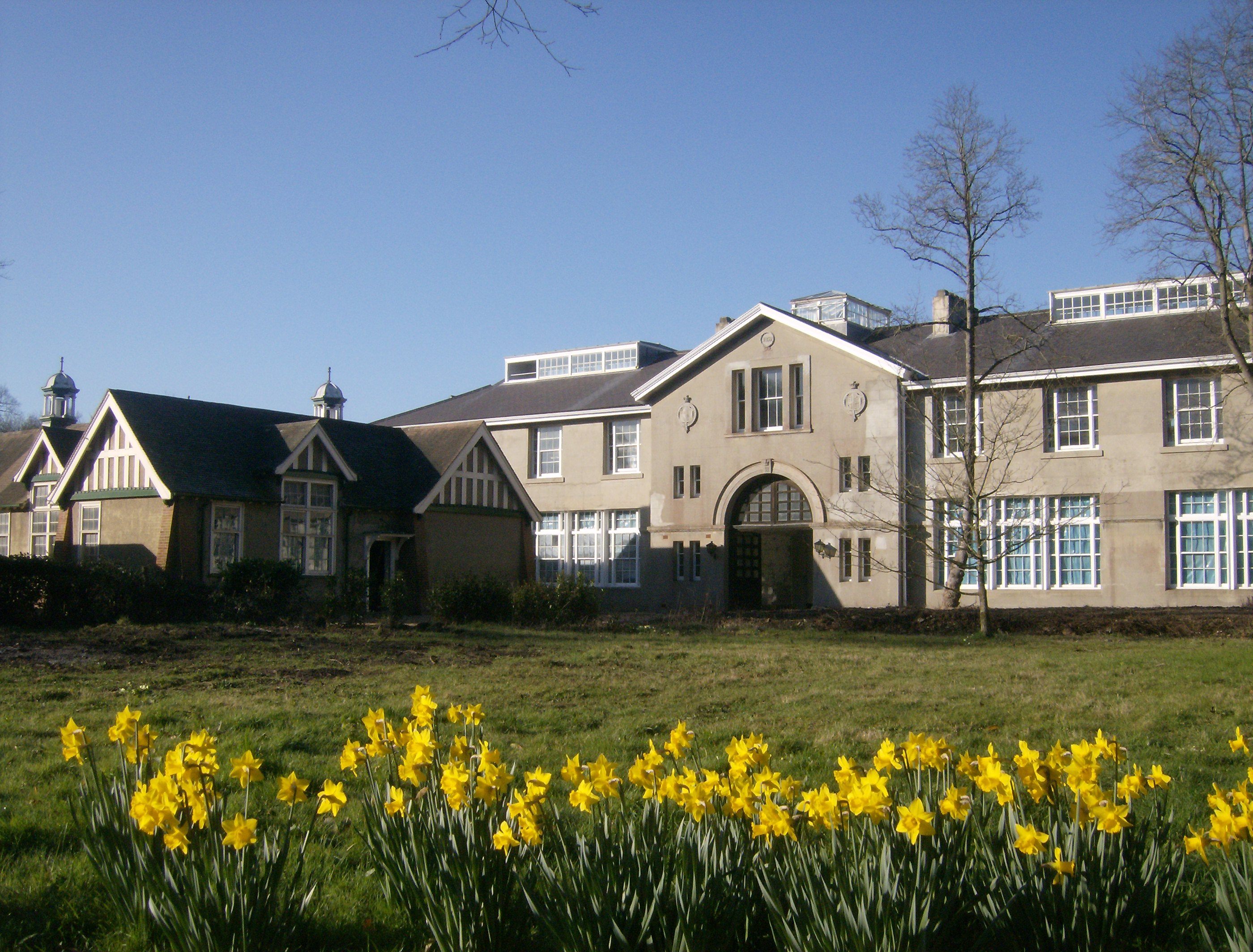
The Royal Naval College, Osborne

After his training as a naval cadet, Holmes à Court began his active service career as a Midshipman. He was promoted to Lieutenant on 17 December 1890 and to Commander on 26 June 1902.

On 1 September 1907 he was appointed as Assistant to the Inspector of Target Practice, and was promoted to Captain on 31 December 1907. In April 1909 he was given his first command, the elderly second-class cruiser HMS Leander, and in February 1910 was moved to captain the much newer protected cruiser HMS Sapphire, at the same time becoming Captain of the Fifth Destroyer Flotilla. His subsequent commands were the gunnery training ship HMS Revenge (December 1910) and the important Dreadnought HMS St Vincent (January to December 1912). Holmes à Court's final command, from 1 August 1914, was the Royal Naval College, Osborne, and its training ship HMS Racer. He served out the whole of the Great War at Osborne and retired from his post in December 1918. He was promoted to Rear-Admiral on the Retired List in February 1919 and to Vice-Admiral in 1924.

Following Holmes à Court's death, Admiral Sir William Hall wrote to The Times that

He was so unassuming and modest that many may have missed the absolute goodness and unselfishness of his character. I knew him from early days in the Britannia and have been shipmates with him for several years. In all that time I never knew him to harbour an unkind thought of others or to think of himself. He had great ability as an officer and seaman, and many a man will remember him for acts of kindness and help. It may not have been his fortune to take a prominent part in the late War, but where many others may have gained distinction he retained to the end the fair name of a great gentleman and a true friend.

== Private life ==
On the death of Holmes à Court's grandfather Lord Heytesbury in 1891, his father had already died, so the peerage went to his oldest brother. At the same time he and his five other brothers were raised to the rank of baron's sons, carrying with it the courtesy title of the Honourable.

In retirement in 1923, Holmes à Court was living at Bishopstrow, near the family seat of Heytesbury. On 4 July 1927, several years after his retirement from active service, he married Lydia Gertrude, a daughter of William Manning, of Wing, Buckinghamshire, and the widow of Holmes à Court's brother the Hon. Charles Holmes à Court (1867–1922). The wedding took place less than a week after it had been announced in The Times, which was said to be owing to illness.

In the event, Holmes à Court survived the illness and lived for another seven years. His funeral took place on 24 October 1934 at the church of Leonard Stanley, Gloucestershire. His widow died on 19 November 1967.

== Arms ==
In Armorial Families (1895), A. C. Fox-Davies reported that Holmes à Court was a Lieutenant in the Royal Navy and blazoned his arms as:

Quarterly 1 and 4, barry wavy of six or and azure, on a canton gules, a lion of England passant guardant or (for Holmes); 2 and 3 per fesse or, and paly of six erminois and azure, in chief an eagle displayed sable, beaked and membered gules, charged on the body with two chevronels argent (for à Court). Upon the escutcheon is placed a helmet befitting his degree, with a mantling azure and or; and for his Crests, 1. out of a naval crown or, an arm embowed in armour, the hand proper, grasping a trident azure, headed or (for Holmes). 2. an eagle displayed sable, charged with two chevronels or, beaked and legged gules, holding in the beak a lily slipped proper (for à Court).
