= Thomas Owen (priest) =

Welsh Anglican priest and translator

Thomas Owen (1749 – May 1812) was a Welsh Anglican priest and translator of works on agriculture.

== Life ==
Owen was born in Anglesey, Wales in 1749. He studied at Jesus College, Oxford, matriculating on 20 March 1767. He obtained a B.A. degree in 1770. He then transferred to The Queen's College, Oxford, obtaining his M.A. degree in 1773. He was ordained deacon on 26 May 1771, and ordained priest on 19 December 1773, both ordinations being carried out by Robert Lowth, Bishop of Oxford, at Christ Church Cathedral, Oxford. He was rector of St Mary's Church, Upton Scudamore, Wiltshire from 1779 to 1812. Owen lived at Upton Scudamore, having no other parish positions.

His translations included The Three Books of M. Terentius Varro Concerning Agriculture (published in 1800), Geōponika, Agricultural Pursuits (published in 2 volumes, 1805), and The Fourteen Books of Rutilius Taurus Aemilianus Palladius on Agriculture (1807).

Owen died n Anglesey in May 1812.
