= Nunney =

Village in Somerset, England

Coordinates: 51.2080°N 2.3786°W

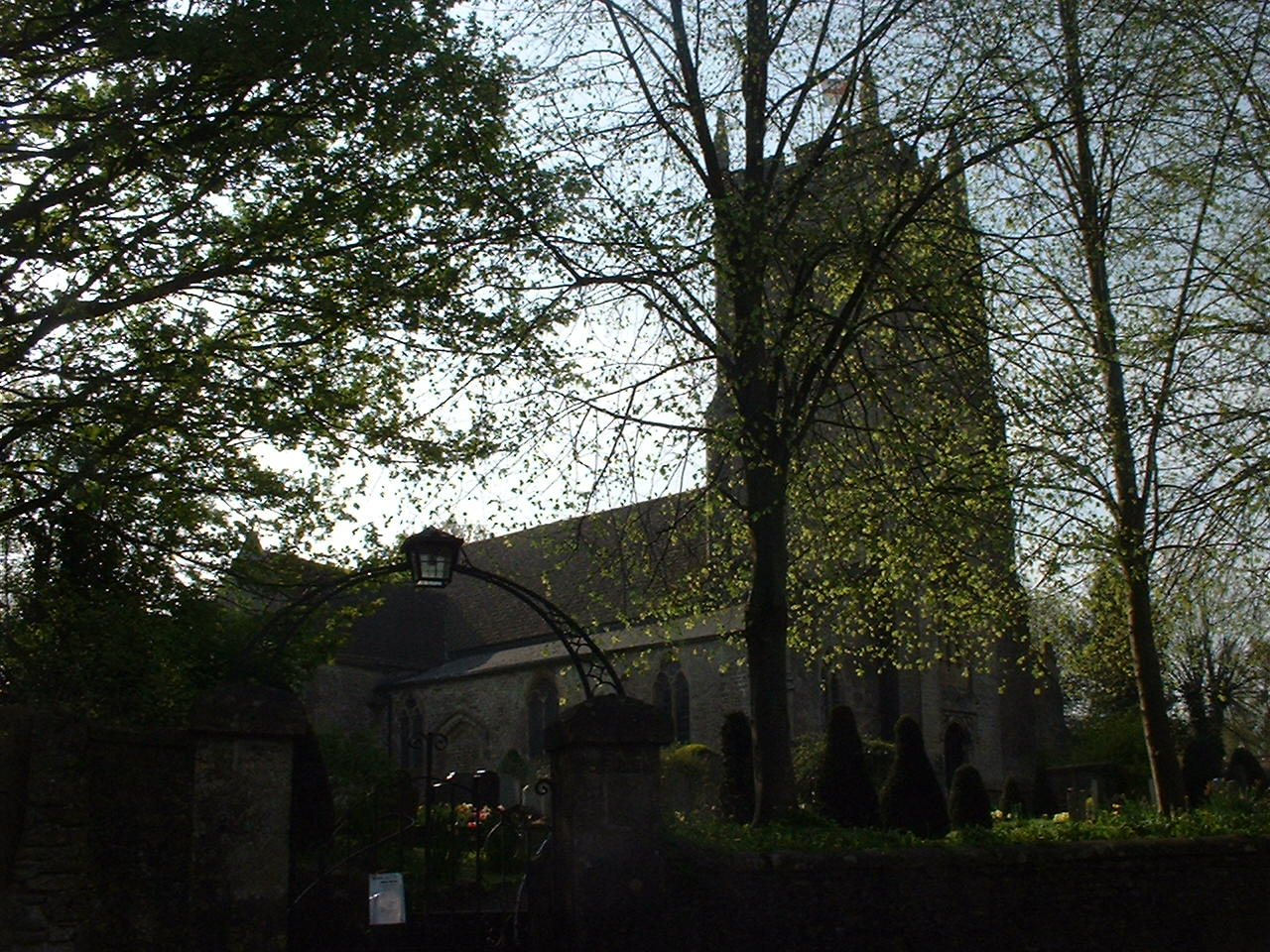
- Church of All Saints, Nunney

- Location within Somerset
- Population: 844 (2011)
- OS grid reference: ST735455
- Unitary authority: Somerset Council
- Ceremonial county: Somerset
- Region: South West
- Country: England
- Sovereign state: United Kingdom
- Post town: FROME
- Postcode district: BA11
- Dialling code: 01373
- Police: Avon and Somerset
- Fire: Devon and Somerset
- Ambulance: South Western
- UK Parliament: Frome and East Somerset

Nunney is a village and civil parish in the English county of Somerset. It is located 3 miles (5 km) south-west of Frome and the parish includes the hamlet of Holwell.

The name of the village comes from Old English and means Nunna's island.

Today, the tourist attractions are the ruins of Nunney Castle, a historic church, and the seasonal events of the village, including the duck race on Easter Sundays and the annual Nunney Fayre Day (late July), organised by the Nunney Community Association, which attracts thousands of visitors each year to the village to enjoy the musical performances at Nunney Castle and the many artisan stalls from local producers throughout the village.

On 30 September 2007, Nunney was the subject of a BBC Radio 4 report, asking whether "the prettiest village in England" is a place where we can learn "how to mend our broken society".

== History ==
Evidence of Roman settlement has been provided by the discovery of a hoard of Roman coins in 1869 at Westdown Farm and a villa with a mosaic floor.

Nunney is mentioned as a manor belonging to William de Moyon in the Domesday Book in 1086, but the book does not mention a castle.

The parish was part of the hundred of Frome.

For many years, from the medieval period until the 19th century, Nunney was the site of water-powered mills owned initially by the Hoddinotts and then by James Fussell.

== Governance ==
The parish council has responsibility for local issues, including setting an annual precept (local rate) to cover the council's operating costs and producing annual accounts for public scrutiny. The parish council evaluates local planning applications and works with the local police, district council officers, and neighbourhood watch groups on matters of crime, security, and traffic. The parish council's role also includes initiating projects for the maintenance and repair of parish facilities, as well as consulting with the district council on the maintenance, repair, and improvement of highways, drainage, footpaths, public transport, and street cleaning. Conservation matters (including trees and listed buildings) and environmental issues are also the responsibility of the council.

For local government purposes, since 1 April 2023, the village comes under the unitary authority of Somerset Council. Prior to this, it was part of the non-metropolitan district of Mendip, which was formed on 1 April 1974 under the Local Government Act 1972, having previously been part of Frome Rural District.

Nunney is part of the Frome and East Somerset county constituency represented in the House of Commons of the Parliament of the United Kingdom. It elects one Member of Parliament (MP) by the first past the post electoral system.

The village falls within the Cranmore, Doulting and Nunney electoral ward. Starting at Doulting in the west, the ward stretches eastwards through Cranmore and Nunney to finish in the east at Whatley. The total ward population taken at the 2011 census was 2,374.

== Geography ==
Cloford Quarry is a geological Site of Special Scientific Interest and Geological Conservation Review site important for the exposures of sediments of Triassic and Jurassic age which occur in major fissures within the Carboniferous Limestone laid down beneath the sea some 350 million years ago.

The Holwell Quarries are another geological Site of Special Scientific Interest which represent an internationally important geological locality. A comprehensive assemblage of Triassic (including Rhaetic), Lower Jurassic and Middle Jurassic fissure fillings are well displayed. The Rhaetic fissure fillings have yielded the richest assemblage of vertebrate faunas known from the British Triassic.

Along with the rest of South West England, Nunney has a temperate climate which is generally wetter and milder than the rest of England. The annual mean temperature is about 10 °C (50 °F) with seasonal and diurnal variations, but due to the modifying effect of the sea, the range is less than in most other parts of the United Kingdom. January is the coldest month with mean minimum temperatures between 1 °C (34 °F) and 2 °C (36 °F). July and August are the warmest months in the region with mean daily maxima around 21 °C (70 °F). In general, December is the dullest month and June the sunniest. The south west of England enjoys a favoured location, particularly in summer, when the Azores High extends its influence north-eastwards towards the UK.

Cloud often forms inland, especially near hills, and reduces exposure to sunshine. The average annual sunshine totals around 1600 hours. Rainfall tends to be associated with Atlantic depressions or with convection. In summer, convection caused by solar surface heating sometimes forms shower clouds and a large proportion of the annual precipitation falls from showers and thunderstorms at this time of year. Average rainfall is around 800–900 mm (31–35 in). About 8–15 days of snowfall is typical. November to March have the highest mean wind speeds, with June to August having the lightest. The predominant wind direction is from the south west.

== Landmarks ==
The market cross across the road from the church is Grade II* listed. It was originally built around 1100, when stood in the churchyard of All Saints' Church. It was removed in 1869, as the noise from children playing on the steps annoyed the rector. The stone was discovered in a builders yard and rebuilt in his garden by the squire of Whatley and the Celtic cross added. After his death and a fire which destroyed his house, the cross was again dismantled and rebuilt on its present site in 1959.

There are over 30 other listed buildings in the village, including Rockfield House which was built in 1805 by John Pinch.

=== Religious sites ===
The Church of All Saints is a Grade I listed building dating from the 12th century.

=== Nunney Castle ===
Nunney Castle is a small, French-style castle surrounded by a deep moat, built for Sir John Delamare in 1373, and said to have been based on the Bastille in Paris, and shows a strong awareness of contemporary French practice. It was later the property of William Paulet, 1st Marquess of Winchester, before passing to several owners and in 1577 was sold by Swithun Thorpe to John Parker who only kept it for a year before selling it to Richard Prater, at a cost of £2000. During the English Civil Wars (1642–51) Colonel Richard Prater, who held the castle until 1645, lost it to Fairfax, the commander of Cromwell's forces in the battle that took place at Nunney. The castle was besieged for two days, but capitulated when Cromwell's men used cannon to blast a great hole in the north west wall of the castle.

=== The George at Nunney Inn ===
The George at Nunney Inn is close to the church and opposite Nunney Castle. It dates from the mid-18th century. Since that time it has been much extended and is now a 10 bedroom hotel with holiday cottages. The interior still features many of the original features with stone walls, exposed beams, and large open fireplaces. It is a Grade II listed building.

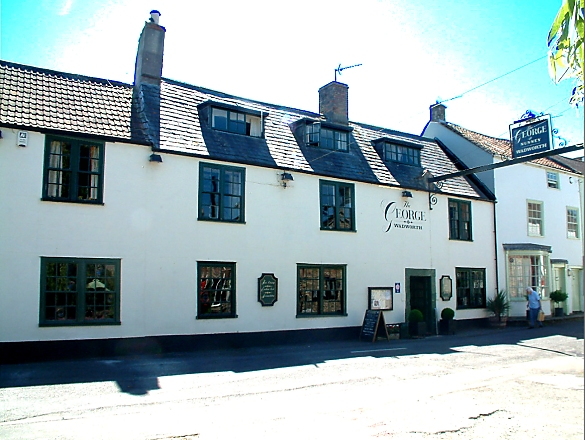
The George at Nunney taken in 2014

=== Nunney Players ===
The Nunney Players are a Drama group, who meet up every year to put on a performance at the village hall. The Nunney Players have won many awards and have put on shows such as Cinderella, Jack and the Beanstalk and Pinocchio.

== Gallery of images ==
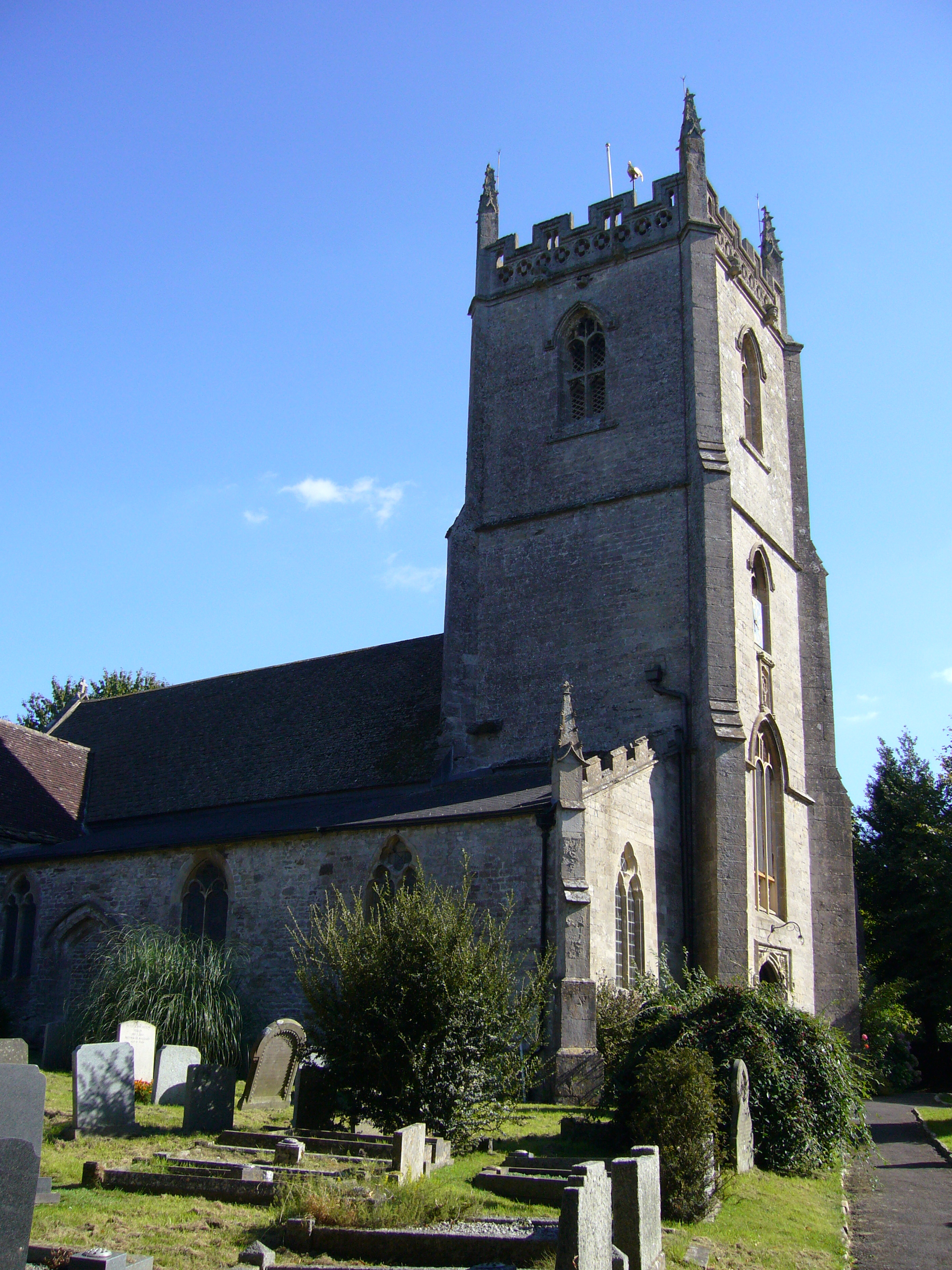
The church

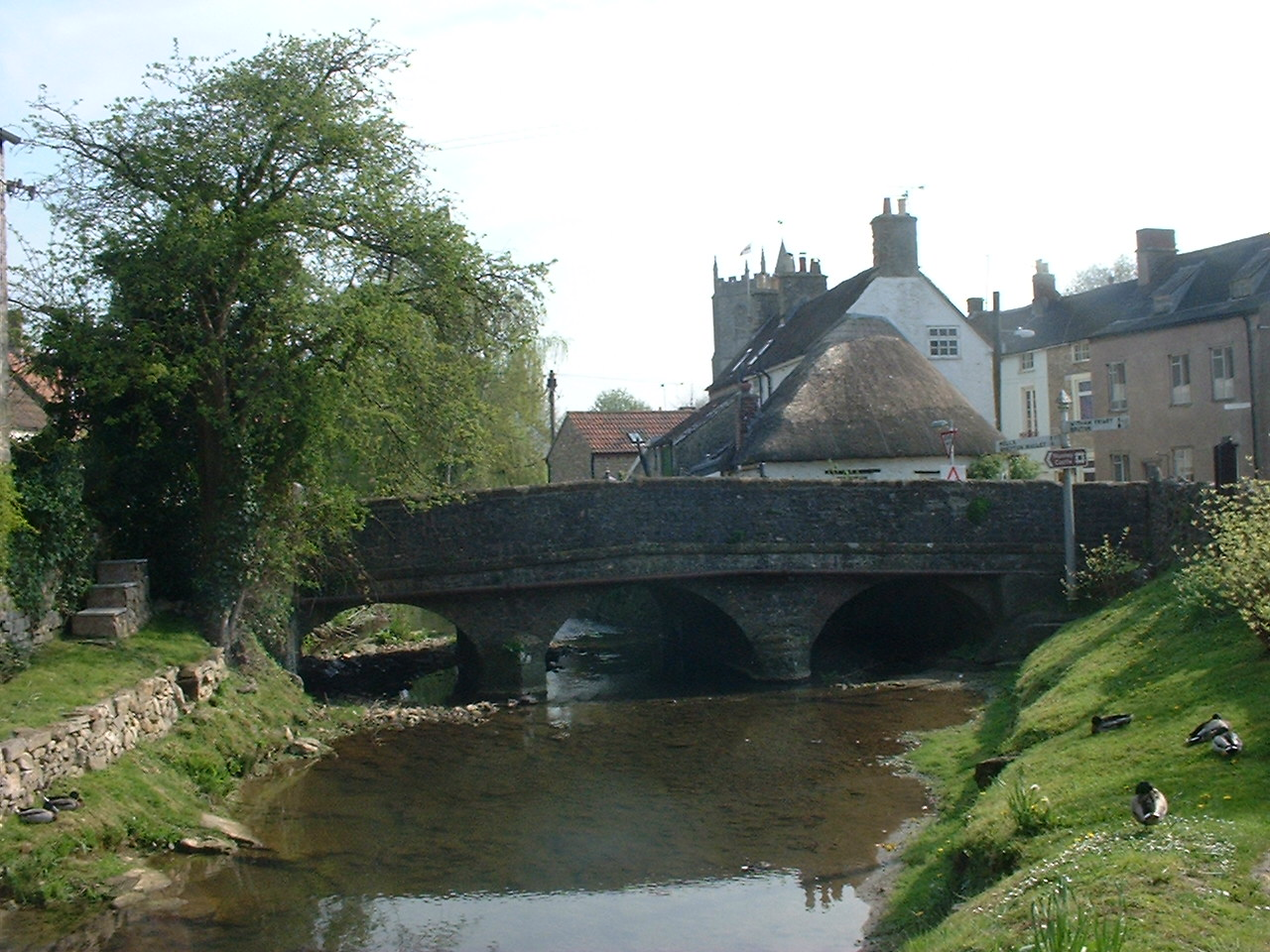
Road bridge at Nunney

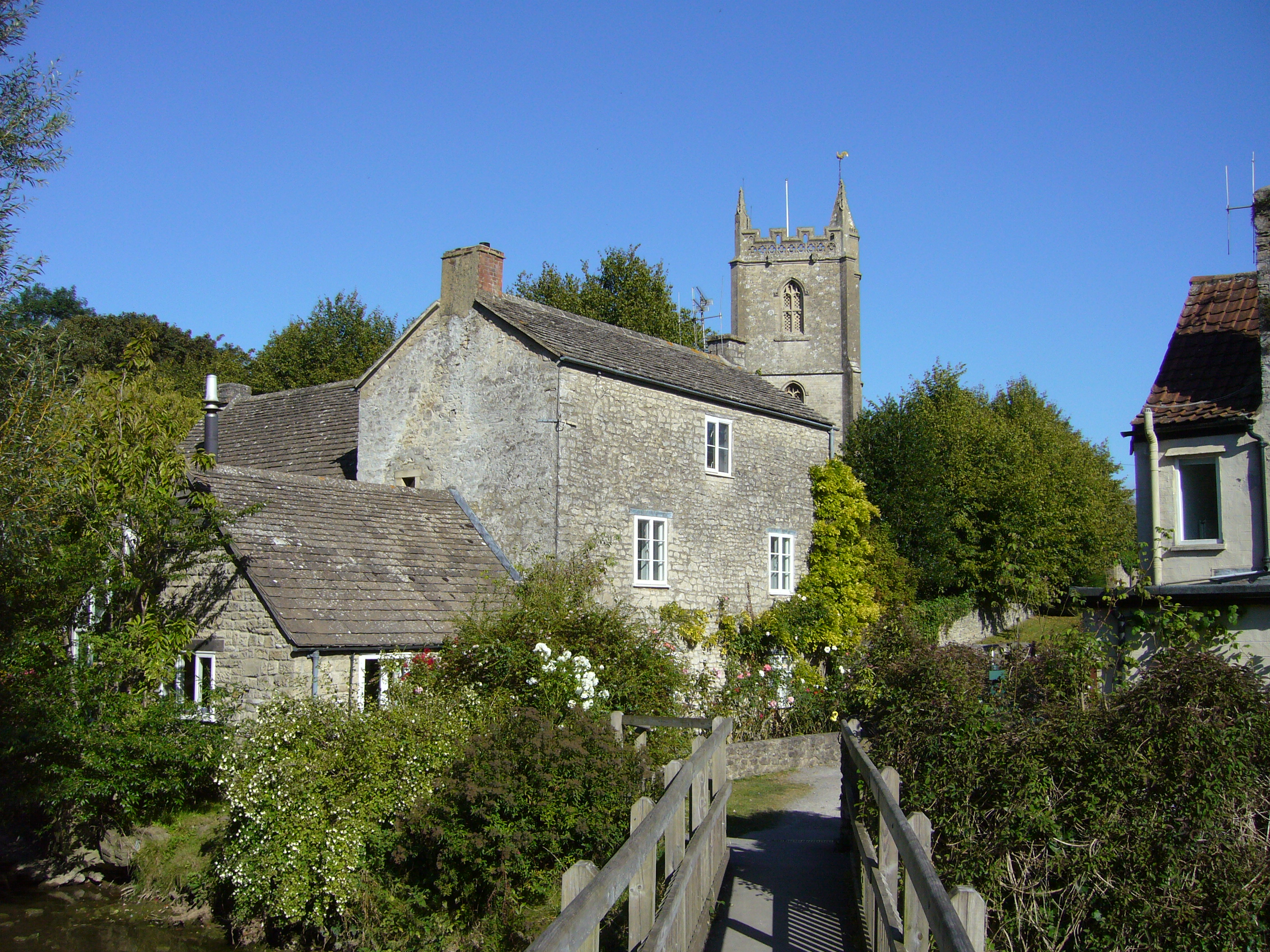
View across the footbridge to the church

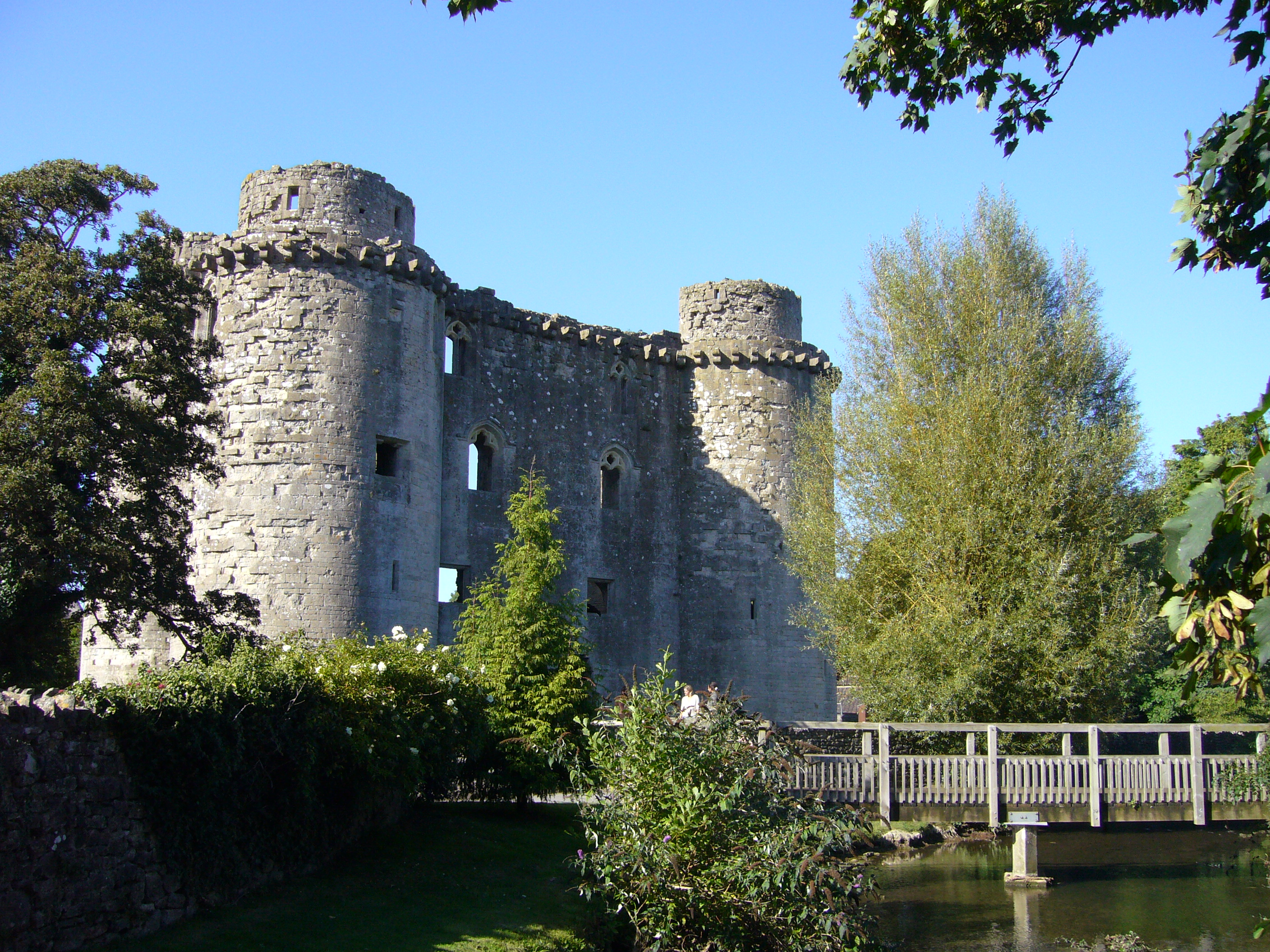
The castle

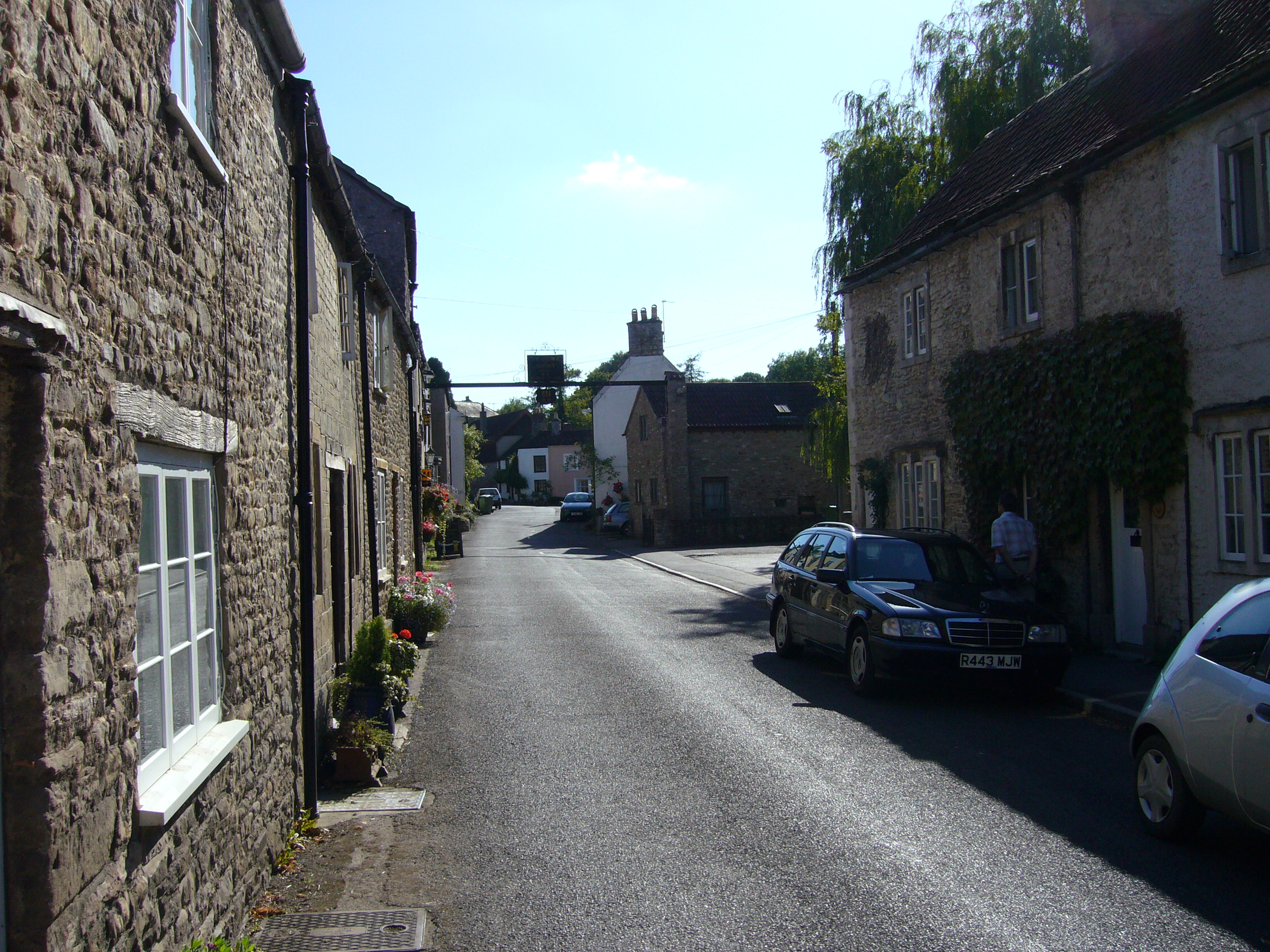
Main street

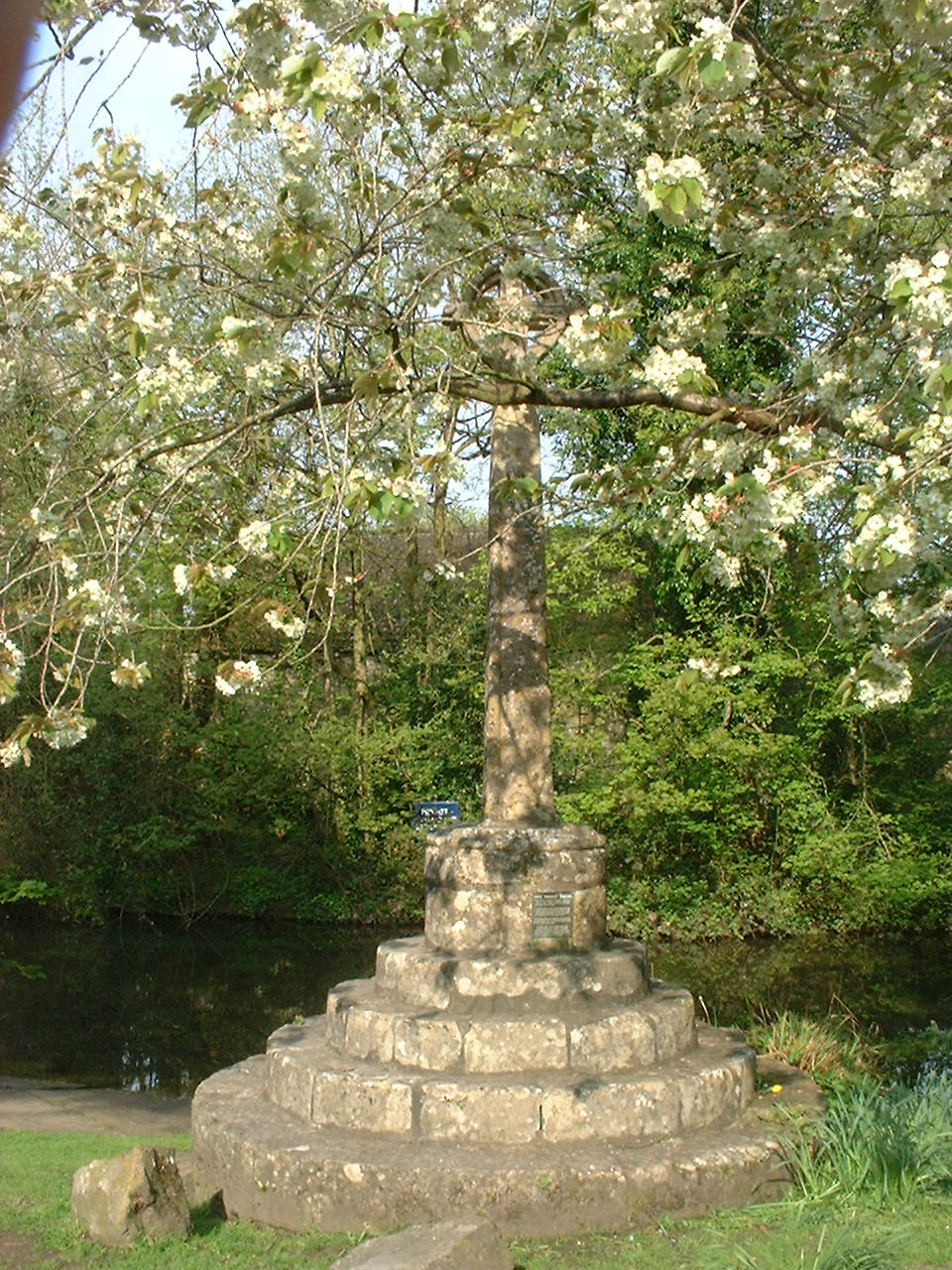
Market Cross
