= John Delamare =

English knight and politician (c.1320–1383)

Sir John Delamare (c. 1320 – 1383) was a knight at the court of King Edward III of England and the builder of Nunney Castle in Somerset.

He gained permission to turn his manor house at Nunney into Nunney Castle in 1373. He was successively High Sheriff of Wiltshire (1374) and then High Sheriff of Somerset and Dorset (1377) and also Knight of the Shire for the same two counties, Wiltshire in 1376 and Somerset in 1373, 1377, and 1382.

He was also lord of the manor of Fisherton Delamare and Bishopstrow in Wiltshire. His heiress was his niece Eleanor Delamere, who died in 1413. Through her marriage to William Paulet, Nunney and Fisherton passed to another William Paulet, 1st Marquess of Winchester.
