= St Denys' Church, Warminster =

Coordinates: 51.2086°N 2.1887°W

St Denys', Warminster
- The Minster Church of St Denys
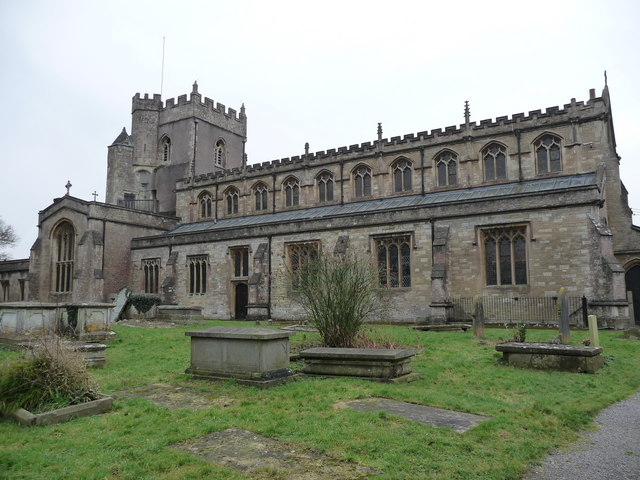

- Location in Wiltshire
- OS grid reference: ST 86924 45494
- Location: Church Street, Warminster, Wiltshire
- Country: England
- Denomination: Anglican
- Website: River Were Churches

History
- Status: Parish church
- Dedication: Saint Denis of Paris

Architecture
- Functional status: Active
- Style: Perpendicular
- Years built: 14th century (rebuilt), 1887–9 (restored)

Administration
- Province: Canterbury
- Diocese: Salisbury
- Archdeaconry: Sarum
- Deanery: Heytesbury
- Parish: Warminster Saint Denys

Listed Building – Grade II*
- Reference no.: 1364460

St Denys' Church (or the Minster Church of St Denys) is the parish church of the town of Warminster, Wiltshire, England, and is the town's oldest church. Begun in the 11th century, rebuilt in the 14th and restored in the 19th, it is a Grade II* listed building.

== History and architecture ==
Although the 1086 Domesday Book did not record a church or priest, the name Warminster was in use in the early 10th century, implying the presence of a Saxon minster church. By the 12th century the church was dedicated to Saint Denys.

The church stands in the northwest of the town, which has developed away from the site of the Saxon settlement. The present building is built in limestone and is cruciform in plan; its earliest parts are from the 11th century, within the crossing and the base of the tower. There was rebuilding or extensive remodelling in the 14th century, and in the 15th a two-bay south chapel was added for the Maudit family. The low central tower has two stair turrets joined. The nave was rebuilt in 1723–4.

The church underwent thorough restoration by Sir Arthur Blomfield in 1887-9: the nave was again rebuilt, now longer, in Perpendicular style, with ten lights each side in the clerestory; and the chancel was extended west into the crossing. Thus only the tower, the south wall of the chancel and the south porch remain from the earlier church.

In 1881 the peal of bells was increased from six to eight, and all were recast except for the tenor which is dated 1737. The bells were being refurbished and rehung in 2019.

The building was designated as Grade II* listed in 1952.

== Interior ==
The organ, installed in 1792, was built by G. P. England for Salisbury Cathedral but had proved to be insufficiently powerful. The organ case is described by Pevsner as "a delightful piece".

The Historic England listing states that the Victorian restoration "involved an exceptionally elegant and generous refurnishing on High Church principles", with the chancel fittings forming an "exceptional ensemble". These include a reredos and choir stalls by the firm of Harry Hems, together with metal chancel screens and gates, and tiles by William Godwin. Hems also made the nave benches and the octagonal pulpit, which has inlaid marble.

Stained glass of various 19th-century dates includes work of Burlison and Grylls, Henry Holiday and Clayton & Bell. A 1950 window in the south aisle is by Christopher Webb.

== Notable vicars ==
1825 to 1841: William Dalby, who held services at the workhouse for the people of Warminster Common, and instigated the building of Christ Church there in 1831.

1841 to 1859: Arthur Fane (1809–1872; illegitimate son of Henry Fane). Described as talented and zealous by the Wiltshire Victoria County History, he established a reformatory school in 1856, and instigated restoration of St Lawrence's chapel in 1855–6. Through his wife he inherited manors at Boyton (in which church he is buried), and at Sherrington.

1859 to 1897: Sir James Erasmus Philipps, 12th Baronet. During his time the number of Sunday services was increased to three, with an average of 1,400 attending in the evening. He raised the money for the 1880s restoration, as well as instigating the building of St John's Church on the other side of the town, and founding St Boniface Missionary College and a Community of St Denys who ran an orphanage and girls' school.

== Parish ==
Since 1290 or earlier, the chapel of St Lawrence in the market place has been a chapel-of-ease to St Denys. The people of the town bought the chapel in 1574, giving it the status of a non-royal peculiar outside the jurisdiction of the Church of England. Since then has been administered by feoffees (trustees) on behalf of the town, and they invite the vicar to hold services.

From the mid-13th century or earlier, the church at Corsley (2 1/2 miles (4.0 km) northwest) was a chapelry of Warminster parish; by 1415 Corsley parish was fully independent.

As the town's population grew in the 19th century, two churches were built: Christ Church in 1831 to serve the south of the town, and St John's in 1865 in the southeast. Christ Church gained its own parish in 1863, and in 1956 the area around St John's was added to Bishopstrow parish, thus the present St Denys parish covers parts of the north and west of the town. A group ministry was established in 1974 to cover all three Warminster churches, Bishopstrow and Upton Scudamore; this continues today as the River Were benefice, although Christ Church is now separate.
