= Bishopstrow House =

Country house in Wiltshire, England

Bishopstrow Hotel & Spa
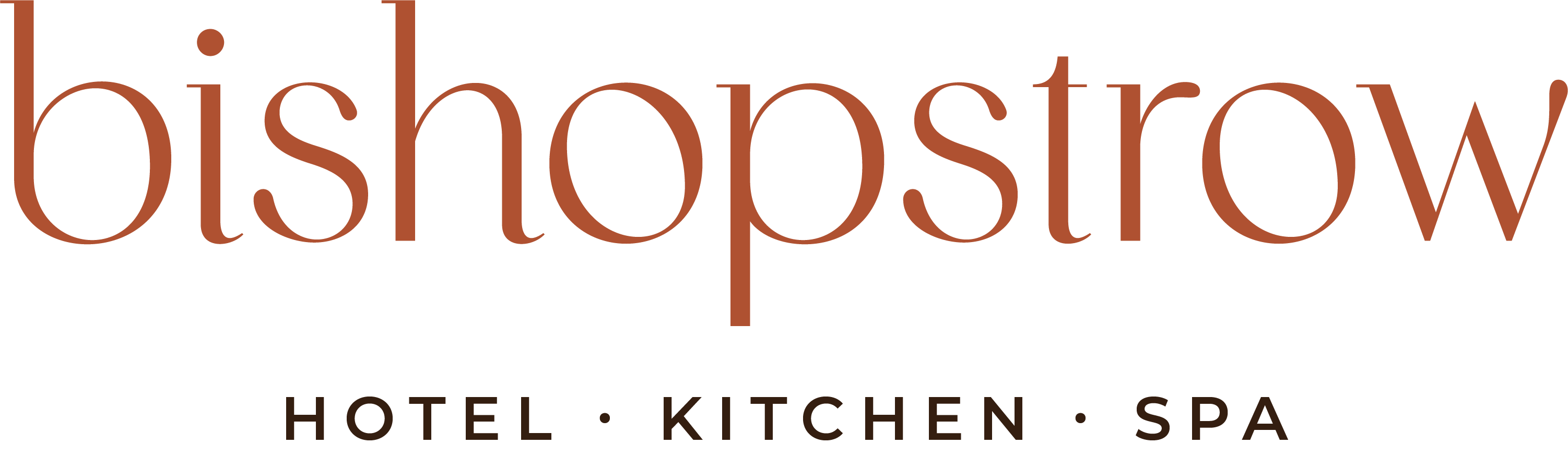

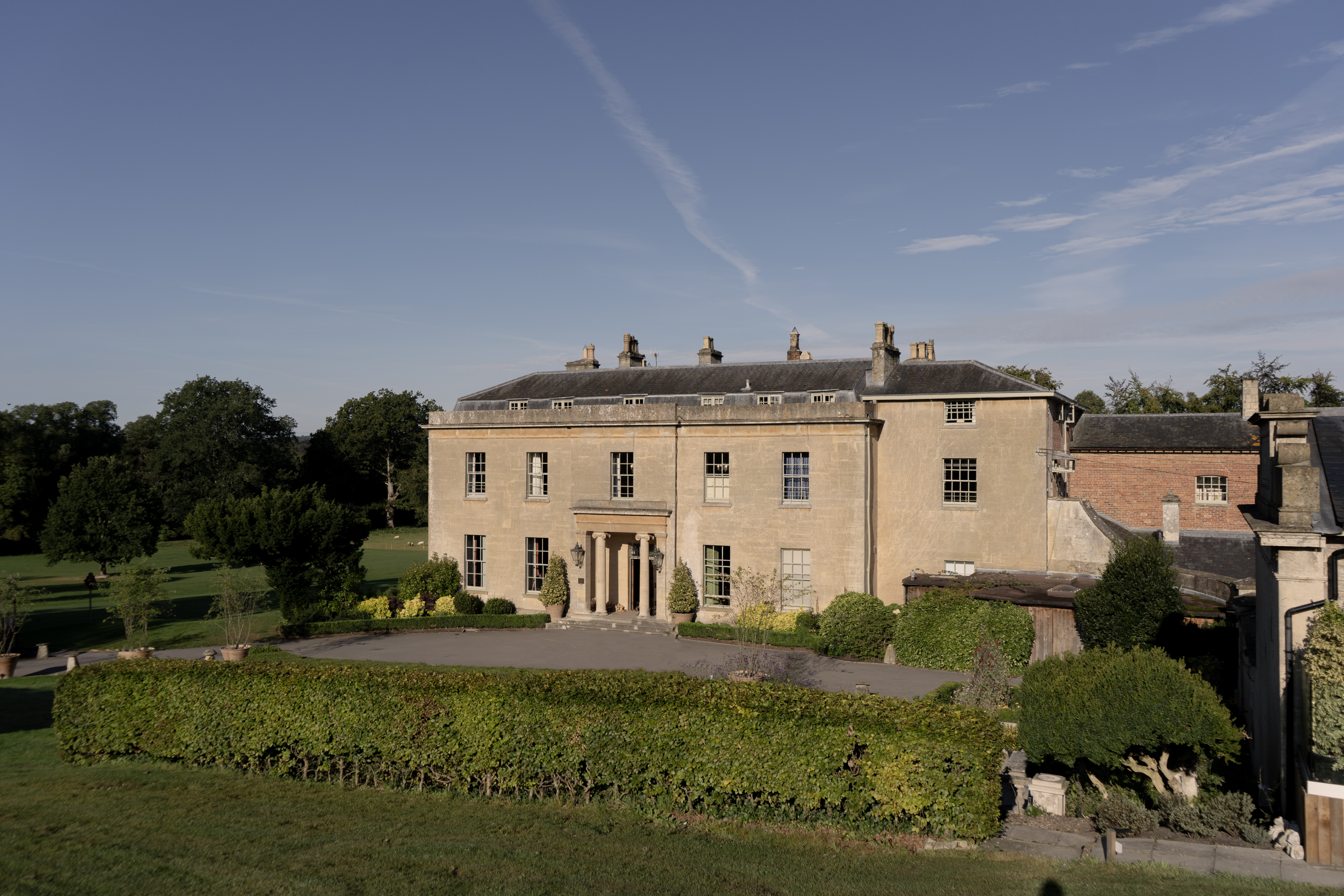

- Location within Wiltshire

General information
- Location: Bishopstrow, Wiltshire, England
- Coordinates: 51°11′52″N 2°8′54″W
- Owner: Ian and Crista Taylor
- Operator: Kaleidoscope Collection

Design and construction
- Architect: John Pinch the elder

Bishopstrow Hotel & Spa is a late-Georgian English country house standing near the B3414 (Salisbury road) in the parish of Bishopstrow, about a mile east of Warminster, in Wiltshire in southern England.

== History ==
A manor house was built at Bishopstrow in the late eighteenth century, between the Salisbury road and the River Wylye, but was destroyed by fire in 1817. The present-day house was then begun for William Temple on the north side of the road, nearer to the escarpment of Salisbury Plain, and was completed by John Pinch the elder in 1821. The gardens of the earlier house were retained and are linked to the new site by a tunnel under the road.

The house is set in grounds of some 11 ha (27 acres). The River Wylye runs through the grounds, and a summerhouse and a boathouse stand alongside it. The grounds also contain two ancient burial mounds: a long barrow and a bowl barrow.

In 1950, the house was sold by the Temple family to W. Keith Neal, a firearms collector, and in 1976 it was purchased by Kurt Schiller, who the next year turned it into a ten-bedroom hotel. It has since been extended to provide more rooms. In 1988 the hotel was bought by the Blandy family. In 1995 it was again sold; in 2001, it became part of the Von Essen hotel group, and in 2011 part of the Longleat Hotel Group. In 2018, the hotel was bought by Versant Developments. In 2021 it had twenty-four double bedrooms, six suites, and two family rooms.

The hotel was then purchased in June 2021 by Ian and Christa Taylor, owners of the Kaleidoscope Collection, with management from Managing Director, Jonathan Walker. The hotel also joined the Small Luxury Hotels Of The World (SLH) consortium. Bishopstrow now has 36 bedrooms, a restaurant and terrace, outdoor and indoor pool as well as a spa and gym.
