= Bishopstrow =

Village in Wiltshire, England

Coordinates: 51.193°N 2.154°W

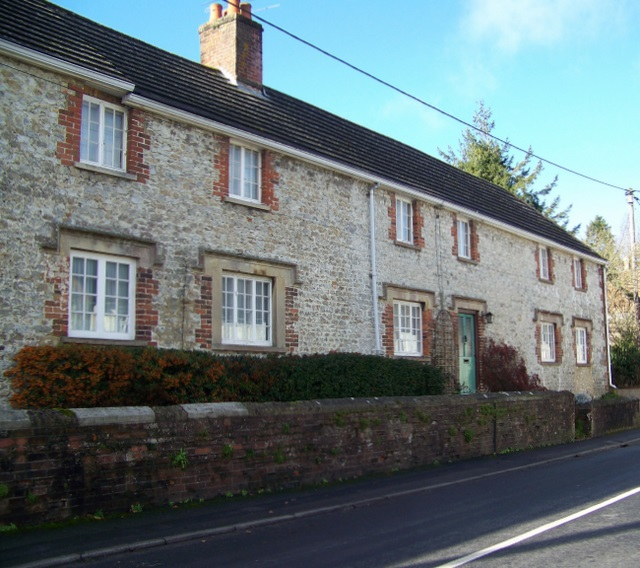
- 19th-century houses on the village street

- Location within Wiltshire
- Population: 145 (in 2021)
- OS grid reference: ST893438
- Civil parish: Bishopstrow
- Unitary authority: Wiltshire
- Ceremonial county: Wiltshire
- Region: South West
- Country: England
- Sovereign state: United Kingdom
- Post town: Warminster
- Postcode district: BA12
- Dialling code: 01985
- Police: Wiltshire
- Fire: Dorset and Wiltshire
- Ambulance: South Western
- UK Parliament: South West Wiltshire

Bishopstrow is a small village and civil parish in Wiltshire, England, on the southeastern edge of the town of Warminster. The village is about 1.5 miles (2.4 km) from the town centre, south of the old Warminster to Salisbury road, formerly the A36, now the B3414.

The modern A36 passes to the south of the village. The parish extends north-east from the Wylye valley onto Salisbury Plain, where its northern section is within the Imber Range sector of the Salisbury Plain military training area.

== History ==
The name may come from "bishop's tree", meaning the place where St Aldhelm's staff miraculously grew into an ash tree. When Bishopstrow was recorded in the Domesday Book of 1086 it was held by Edward of Salisbury.

Ela, Countess of Salisbury gave Bishopstrow manor in 1236 to the nunnery at Lacock, which she had recently founded. After the Dissolution the property passed through several hands until it was bought in 1635 by William Temple. His descendants include another William who was High Sheriff in 1833. The house and its parkland were sold in 1950 to W. Keith Neal but the Temple family retained much land in the parish.

In the 18th century, Bishopstrow House stood between the Salisbury road and the river. In 1817 William Temple built a new house on the north side of the road using the Bath architect John Pinch the elder, which has been operated as a hotel and restaurant since 1977.

A mill was recorded in Domesday Book. The present Bishopstrow Mill, which was in operation until 1969, has three storeys plus attic, in red brick and rubble stone, and was mostly rebuilt after a fire in 1873. Adjoining are the 18th-century miller's house and 19th-century granary, in white-painted rubble stone.

== Governance ==
The parish is considered too small to support a parish council, so instead it has a parish meeting, a body in which all electors for the parish are voting members. Almost all local government functions are carried out by Wiltshire Council, a unitary authority created in 2009. The village is represented in parliament by Andrew Murrison, and in Wiltshire Council by Christopher Newbury, both Conservatives.

== Parish church ==
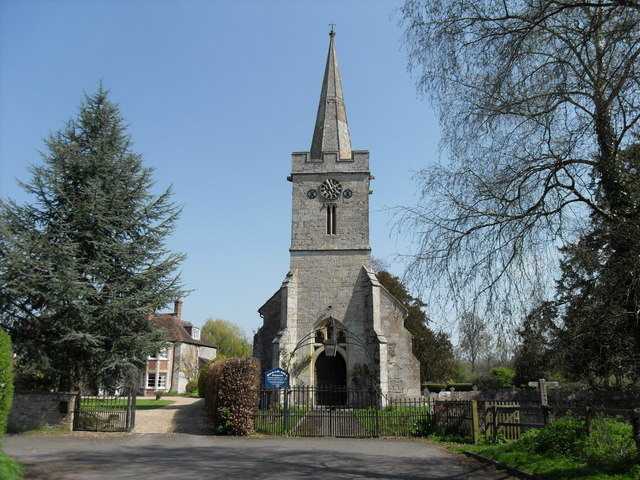
St Aldhelm's church

The Church of England parish church of St Aldhelm is a Grade II* listed building. No church is mentioned in Domesday Book and the first record is from c.1120, but evidence of a Saxon church on the same site was uncovered in the 1980s. By the 13th century the church was dedicated to Aldhelm, the 8th-century saint. The present church dates from the 14th century although only the slender west tower, with recessed spire, remains from that time. The nave was rebuilt in 1757 and the chancel in 1840–1842, and restoration was carried out in 1876–1877 by W. Scott Champion. The spire was rebuilt in 1931.

In 1785 the solitary bell was recast by Robert Wells of Aldbourne; a second bell was added in 1902. The chancel screen of 1916–1920 has fine Arts and Crafts carving and fan coving. The screen with double doors between the porch and the tower is from the same period.

In 1956 the Warminster suburb around St John's church, Boreham was added to Bishopstrow parish, which was renamed Bishopstrow and Boreham. St John's had been built in 1865 to relieve overcrowding at Warminster's parish church of St Denys. Today the parish is part of the River Were benefice, which also includes St Denys.

== Amenities ==
Bishopstrow College, in eight acres of grounds, is an independent school for children aged 7–17 who do not have English as their first language. There is no state school in the parish; a two-room school was built in the village in 1848 and closed in 1921.

== Notable people ==
- Vice-Admiral the Hon. Herbert Edward Holmes à Court (1869–1934) lived at Bishopstrow after retiring from the Royal Navy.
- Lt. General Sir Roderick Cordy-Simpson retired to the village and in 2004 was appointed a Deputy Lieutenant of Wiltshire.
- Juliana Popjoy who was a celebrated mistress to Beau Nash was born here c.1710 and died here in 1777.
