= William Keith Neal =

English writer, collector and enthusiast

W. Keith Neal
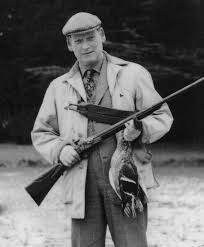
- W. Keith Neal with Probin gun at Bishopstrow House, Wiltshire, 1969
- Born: William Keith Neal; 11 November 1905; Boxmoor, Hertfordshire, United Kingdom
- Died: 10 April 1990 (aged 84); Guernsey, Channel Islands
- Occupation: Antique gun collector
- Spouse: Jane Erskine-Murray
- Children: Diana Margaret Jane

William Keith Neal (11 November 1905 – 10 April 1990) was an English writer, collector and enthusiast who amassed what is considered to be one of the greatest private collections of antique firearms ever assembled. During his lifetime he was regarded as the leading authority on antique firearms in Britain and co-authored "the standard reference work" on the history of British gunmaking between the 16th and late 19th centuries. A Past Master of the Worshipful Company of Gunmakers, his collection of around 2,000 firearms included six items "from the gun cabinet of Louis XIII" and two miniature, gold-inlaid pistols that were reportedly "the last gift Napoléon Bonaparte gave to his three-year-old son before military defeat and subsequent exile."

== Early gun collecting ==
He acquired his first pistol – a "nasty, cheap" Belgian-made .22 Derringer – while still a pupil at Berkhamsted School. The pistol had been brought into school by another boy and Keith Neal traded a pocket knife for it. Several months later he accidentally shot himself in the thigh with the pistol and although the bullet penetrated deeply, doctors advised against its removal and it remained in his leg for the rest of his life. At the age of 12 he bought his first antique firearm – a percussion-cap pistol – for 3 shillings at an antique shop in Broadstairs, Kent. The pistol is still in the collection today.

Keith Neal spent his early career working for the distinguished Bath portrait photographer Herbert Lambert. During these years his collection grew steadily, limited only by his financial resources. His work as a photographer's apprentice also "gave him access to the great gun collections of the region's stately homes" and "often he came away with gifts of firearms from aristocrats moved by his enthusiasm for their gun cabinets." In 1930 he began reassembling the Packington Old Hall gun cabinet originally collected by Lord Guernsey. This unique collection of obsolete long arms, which had been preserved in deer grease, dated from 1725 to 1795, and become the nucleus of his "unrivalled" group of English sporting guns, and indeed his whole collection. He acquired the first piece – a flintlock sporting rifle, made by John Fox Twigg (1732–1792) – for £1.15s from gun dealer Frank Russell. By 1933, his collection was already being recognised as "one of the most complete collections of English weapons" in private hands.

== Exhibitions ==
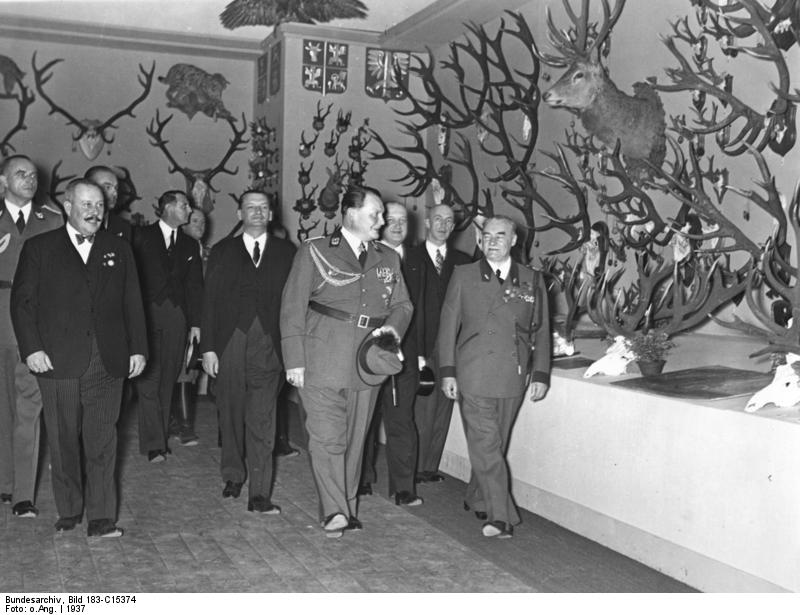
Hermann Göring at the opening of the International Hunting Exhibition in Berlin, 1937

By 1937, the date of the International Hunting Exhibition in Berlin, he was already an established expert. His contribution to the prize-winning British Section of the exhibition was rewarded by a medal presented by Hermann Göring, who had performed the opening ceremony. At the British Sporting Exhibition held at the Imperial Institute, London, in January 1938, he organised a display showing the development of firearms over three hundred years. His own collection was sufficiently extensive to provide sixty-two of the weapons which he was on hand to demonstrate. It was the largest exhibition of antique firearms ever held in London, and included a drop-down breech-action rifle from 1660 as well as guns made by Joseph Manton, all in working order.

== World War II ==
During World War II he was disqualified from military service due to a bout of tuberculosis in his twenties. Instead, he became a regular visitor to the United States where he sold antique firearms on behalf of the Ministry of Economic Warfare, the currency raised then being used to purchase modern handguns for use by the Special Operations Executive. His travels were not without risk – he was torpedoed in the Atlantic and spent 14 days adrift.

== Later years ==
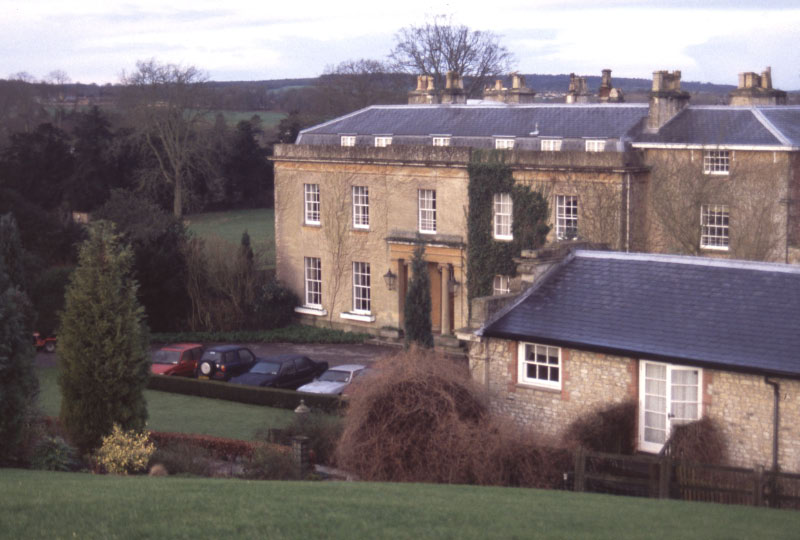
Bishopstrow House, Wiltshire

In 1950 he moved to Bishopstrow House, an imposing Regency house near Warminster, Wiltshire, which was to be his home until he settled in Guernsey in 1976. Bishopstrow provided a backdrop to the largest and most important collection of British and European guns in private hands. It was also the centre of learning where a series of standard reference works mainly on British firearms were produced, nearly all in collaboration with his friend David Henry Lempriere Back, which are now regarded as the definitive on their subject. He was also an expert on railway telegraph insulators (on which he also wrote two books), steam engines, and vintage Bentley motor cars.

Every firearm was stripped and cleaned, nearly always by himself, according to his own system, after which it was ready to fire at a moment's notice – usually at Colonel Peter Hawker's iron target which stood on the lawn outside the drawing room. All the flintlocks were fitted with a professionally knapped flint wrapped in red Morocco leather to hold it firmly in place.

Keith Neal's interest had always been in his own words "that of a shooter first and a collector afterwards. All my life my first thought on finding a gun has been does it fit me? Can I shoot with it?" His extraordinary feel for wood and metal was complemented by a love of field sports, and of the countryside and its traditions. He was also thoroughly conversant with contemporary gunmaking, and served three times as Master of the Worshipful Company of Gunmakers.

== Personal life ==
In December 1947 Keith Neal married Jane Erskine-Murray. They had one daughter, Diana Margaret Jane.

== Bibliography ==
- Spanish Guns and Pistols. London: G. Bell & Sons. 1955. OCLC 776948757.
- An Exhibition of Firearms: Selected from the collection of W. Keith Neal. Country Landowners' Association. 1962. OCLC 561969557.
- An exhibition of Firearms : Showing the development of the gun, the rifle and the pistol from Queen Elizabeth I to H. M. Queen Elizabeth II, selected from the collection W. Keith Neal Esq. Birmingham: Kynoch. 1962. OCLC 886452351.
- The Mantons: Gunmakers. London: Barrie & Jenkins. 1967. ISBN 978-0-257-66549-8. (with D.H.L. Back)
- Collecting Duelling Pistols. London: Arms & Armour Press. 1968. OCLC 3792328.
- Forsyth & Co: Patent Gunmakers. London: Bell. 1969. ISBN 978-0-713-51541-1. (with D.H.L. Back)
- Great British Gunmakers, 1740-1790: The history of John Twigg and the Packington guns. London: Sotheby Parke Bernet Publications. 1975. ISBN 978-0-856-67015-2. (with D.H.L. Back)
- A Supplement to The Mantons, Gunmakers. Tisbury: Compton Press. 1978. OCLC 5362594. (with D.H.L. Back)
- British Gunmakers: Their trade cards, cases & equipment, 1760–1860. Warminster: Compton Press. 1980. ISBN 978-0-900-19358-3. (with D.H.L. Back)
- Searching for Railway Telegraph Insulators. St. Saviours: Signal Box Press. 1982. ISBN 978-0-950-79590-4.
- Great British Gunmakers: 1540-1740. Norwich: Historical Firearms. 1984. ISBN 978-0-950-88421-9. (with D.H.L. Back)
- Railway and other Rare Insulators. St. Saviours: Signal Box Press. 1987. ISBN 978-0-950-79591-1.
- British Gunmakers: Messrs Griffin & Tow and W. Bailes 1740-1790. Norwich: Historical Firearms. 1989. ISBN 978-0-950-88422-6. (with D.H.L. Back)
