= Upton Scudamore =

Village in Wiltshire, England

Coordinates: 51.230°N 2.193°W

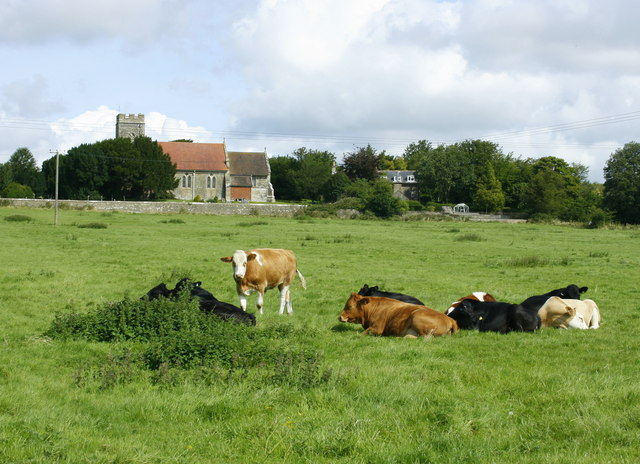
- Cattle and parish church

- Location within Wiltshire
- Population: 295 (in 2011)
- OS grid reference: ST866479
- Civil parish: Upton Scudamore
- Unitary authority: Wiltshire
- Ceremonial county: Wiltshire
- Region: South West
- Country: England
- Sovereign state: United Kingdom
- Post town: Warminster
- Postcode district: BA12
- Dialling code: 01985
- Police: Wiltshire
- Fire: Dorset and Wiltshire
- Ambulance: South Western
- UK Parliament: South West Wiltshire
- Website: www.uptonscudamore.org.uk

Upton Scudamore is a village and civil parish in Wiltshire, England. The village lies about 1.8 miles (3 km) north of the town of Warminster and about the same distance south of Westbury. The parish includes the hamlet of Halfway.

The village occupies a ridge which is the watershed between tributaries of the Bristol Avon and those of the Hampshire Avon. Upton Cow Down rises above the village to the north-east, on the western edge of Salisbury Plain. Springs in the north of the parish are the source of the River Biss, known here as the Biss Brook.

== History ==
Several bowl barrows are evidence of Bronze Age activity in the area.

In earlier centuries, the name of the village was often spelt Upton Skidmore. It appears on John Sexton's map of Wiltshire (1610) as simply Upton.

A church school was built in 1839, enlarged in 1871, and closed in 1925 owing to falling pupil numbers.

The village has a pub, the Angel Inn. An inn with the same name was operating in 1807, close to the site of the present establishment.

== Religious sites ==
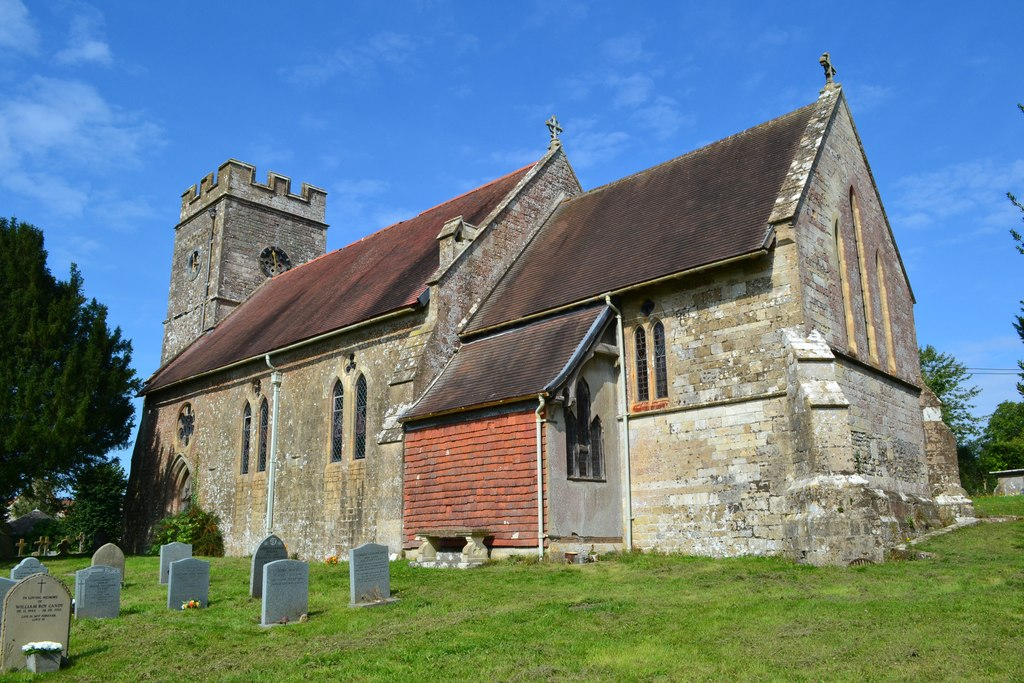
Church of St Mary the Virgin, Upton Scudamore

The parish church of St Mary the Virgin has 12th-century origins and stands on the site of a smaller Saxon church. The west tower was added in 1750, and the church was largely rebuilt in 1855 and 1859 by G.E. Street, in 13th-century style. In 1968 it was designated as Grade II* listed.

Anglo-Saxon masonry is present in the long-and-short quoins of the nave. The north doorway of the nave is late-12th-century, although the opening was altered in the 15th century and much of the carving was restored in the 19th century. The font bowl, with chevron and strapwork carving, is also from the 12th century. The north chapel was added in the 14th century. Monuments include two damaged effigies of knights, from the late 13th and late 14th centuries.

Notable rectors include Thomas Owen, translator of works on agriculture, from 1779 until his death in 1812. A group ministry was established in 1974 to cover parishes centred on St Denys', Warminster; this continues today as the River Were benefice.

There was a chapel at Norridge, in the southwest of the parish, in the late 13th century but its site is not known. A Baptist chapel was built in the village by the Warminster congregation in 1850. It fell out of use in 1907 and became a private house.

== Notable buildings ==
As well as the church, the parish has another Grade II* listed building: Parks Court (formerly Manor Farmhouse), north-east of the church. The Park family held the manor since before 1242. Julian Orbach writes that the house has a "remarkably intact two-bay early-14th-century hall" between later wings. The gabled side wings and the porch were probably built or rebuilt by the Seaman family, tenants in the early 17th century. Restoration in 1985–6 included reversing or moving some of the 17th-century alterations. Inside there is 17th-century wainscot panelling and a staircase which is probable from the middle of that century.

North of the church, Temple Manor is on the site of the manor farm and is named after another landholding family. The house has three gabled attics and was built in the mid-17th century in brick; a rear range was added in the early 19th century. At the east end of the village, Halfway House is also a 17th-century brick house enlarged in the 19th century.

== Governance ==
Upton Scudamore elects a parish council every four years. Most local government services are provided by Wiltshire Council, which has its offices in Trowbridge. The village is represented in Parliament by the MP for South West Wiltshire, Andrew Murrison, and in Wiltshire Council by Fleur de Rhé-Philipe.

Until 1934, when the civil parish of Chapmanslade was created, Upton Scudamore parish extended west to include Thoulstone and the east side of Chapmanslade village.

== Scudamore organs ==
John Baron (c.1807–1885) was rector of Upton Scudamore from 1850 until his death. While undertaking restoration of the church he wished to move music-making from the west end to the chancel, but there was neither money nor space for a large organ. Instead, he designed a small organ with one rank of pipes, one open diapason stop and no pedals, which was built by Nelson Hall (a local blacksmith) and housed in a case designed by G. E. Street, the architect commissioned to restore the church. Baron published in 1858 a short book Scudamore organs, or, Practical hints respecting organs for village churches and small chancels, with a frontispiece showing the organ installed at Upton Scudamore. The book led to the building of similar organs elsewhere, and a second edition was printed in 1862.

By 1860, Nelson Hall was selling organs priced from £80 at the Scudamore Organ Manufactory, giving a Warminster address. After Hall's early death in 1862, many Scudamore organs were built by the leading London makers, Henry Willis & Sons.
