= British Rail Class 59 =

Class of diesel electric locomotives

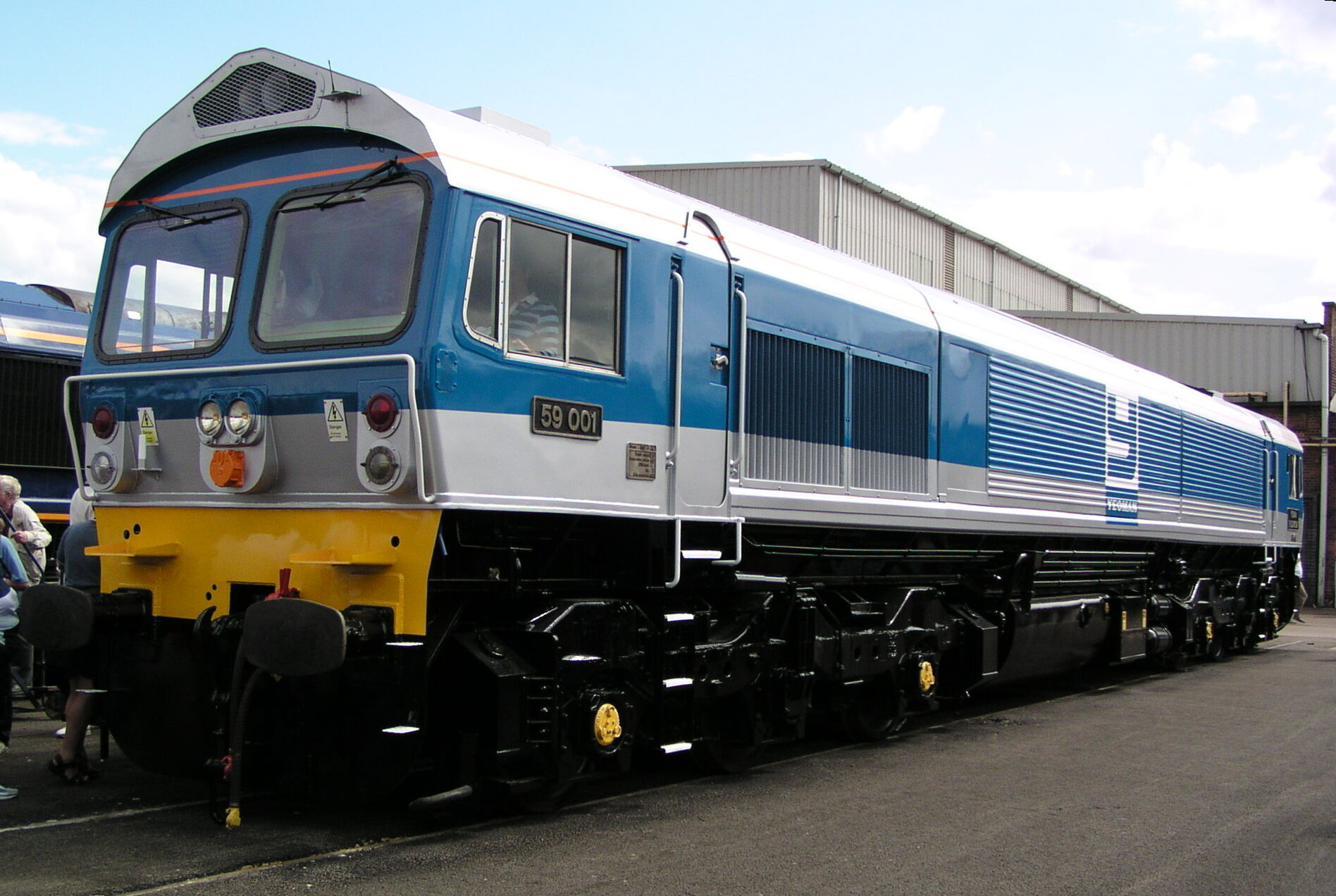
- A Class 59 at Doncaster Works in 2003
Type and origin
- Power type: Diesel-electric
- Builder: GM Electro-Motive Division, at La Grange, Illinois, USA and London, Ontario, Canada
- Model: JT26CW-SS
- Build date: 1985–1995
- Total produced: 15
Specifications
- Configuration
  - UIC: Co′Co′
  - Commonwealth: Co-Co
- Gauge: 1,435 mm (4 ft 8 1/2 in) standard gauge
- Bogies: 2 x EMD HTC
- Wheel diameter: 1.067 m (3 ft 6.0 in)
- Minimum curve: 80 m (262 ft 6 in)
- Wheelbase: 17.239 m (56 ft 6.7 in)
  - Axle spacing (Asymmetrical): Axles 1–2 and 5–6: 2.022 m (6 ft 7.6 in); Axles 2–3 and 4–5: 2.127 m (6 ft 11.7 in)
  - Bogie: 4.149 m (13 ft 7.3 in)
- Pivot centres: 13.259 m (43 ft 6.0 in)
- Length: 21.349 m (70 ft 0.5 in) over buffers
- Width: 2.629 m (8 ft 7.5 in)
- Height: 3.912 m (12 ft 10.0 in)
- Axle load: 20.97 t (20.64 LT; 23.12 ST)
- Loco weight: 126 t (124 LT; 139 ST)
- Fuel capacity: 4,543 L (999 imp gal; 1,200 US gal)
- Prime mover: EMD 16-645E3C
- Engine type: Two-stroke V16 diesel
- Aspiration: Turbocharged
- Displacement: 169.1 L (10,320 in^{3})
- Generator: EMD AR11 MLD-D14A
- Traction motors: 6 × EMD D77B
- Gear ratio: 62:15
- MU working: AAR system (Note: Also used by Classes 66, 67, 68 (numbers 68008–68015 only), 69, 70, and 73/9.)
- Train heating: None
- Loco brake: Air
- Train brakes: Air
- Safety systems: AWS; TPWS
Performance figures
- Maximum speed: 59/0 & 59/1: 60 mph (97 km/h); 59/2: 75 mph (121 km/h)
- Power output
  - Continuous: Total: 2,500 kW (3,300 hp); At rails: 1,889 kW (2,533 hp)
- Tractive effort
  - Continuous: 291 kN (65,419 lb_{f}) at 14 mph (23 km/h)
- Brakeforce: 69 t (68 LT; 76 ST)
Career
- Operators: Heavy Haul Rail; GB Railfreight
- Numbers: 59/0: 59001–59005; 59/1: 59101–59104; 59/2: 59201–59206
- Axle load class: Route Availability 7
- Delivered: January 1986 – August 1995
- First run: 17 February 1986
- Specifications are for subclasses /0 and /1 as at January 1992, except where otherwise noted.

The British Rail Class 59 is a fleet of Co-Co diesel-electric locomotives built between 1985 and 1995 by the Electro-Motive Division of General Motors for use in Great Britain. A total of 15 locomotives were built for three different operators.

They were both the first privately owned diesel locomotives, and the first US-made diesel locomotives, to operate regularly on British mainline railways. One member of the class operated in Germany between 1997 and 2014, before returning to the UK.

== Overview ==
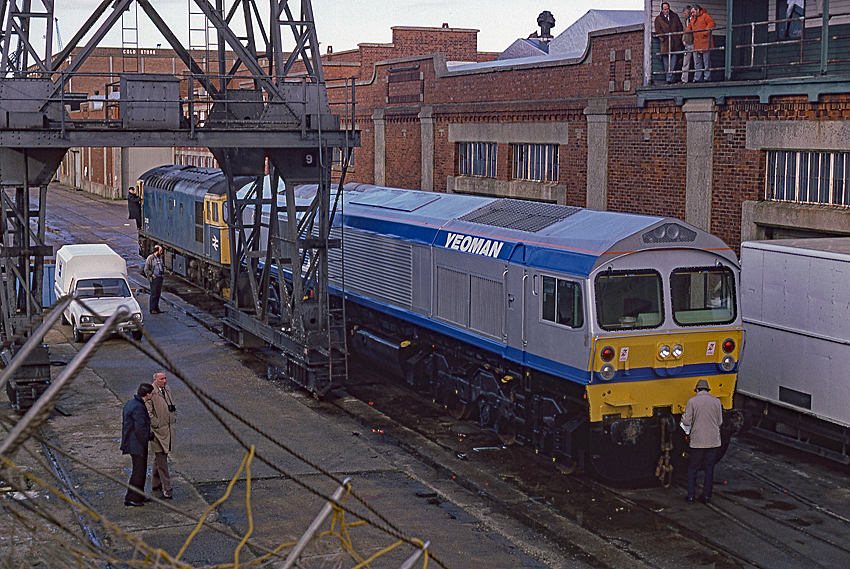
59001 at Southampton Docks having been unloaded from the MV Fairlift in 1986

Foster Yeoman operated the Torr Works quarry near Merehead in Somerset, with much of the output going to rail-served depots at places such as Theale and Acton. From May 1983 the trains had been diagrammed for Class 56 locomotives but up to 40% of services were arriving late. Foster Yeoman had been impressed by the power and reliability of the EMD SW1001 shunter that they had been operating at the Torr quarry since December 1980, and so invited EMD to tender for the delivery of six mainline locomotives to use instead of those supplied by British Rail. Domestic manufacturers Brush Traction and British Rail Engineering Limited were also invited to tender, but could not meet the 95% availability that Foster Yeoman demanded.

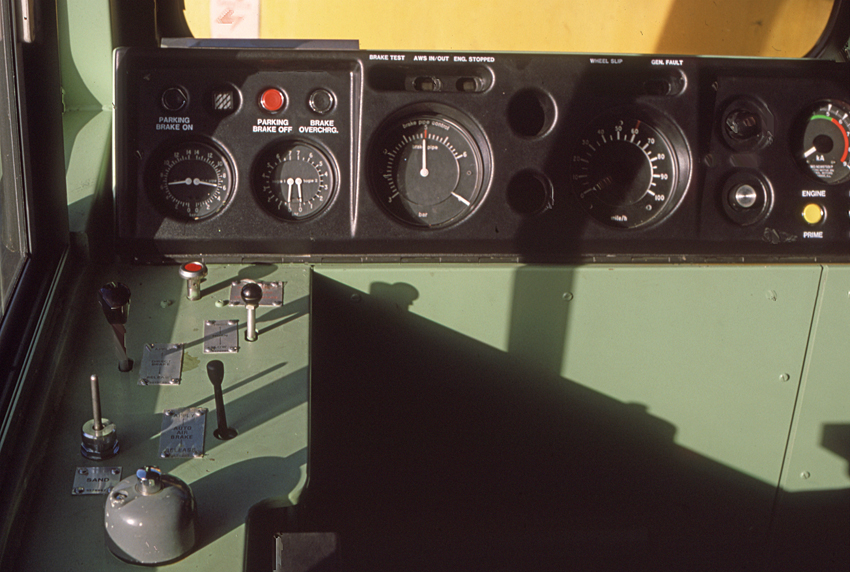
Inside the cab

EMD based the design on their SD40-2 with 'Super Series' wheel creep control. This allowed a single locomotive to operate the heaviest Foster Yeoman trains which would enable double-heading to be dispensed with and so just four locomotives were ordered in November 1984. EMD created a new design with their EMD 645 engine inside the British loading gauge, along with British braking and safety systems and with a cab layout similar to the British Rail Class 58 to aid driver familiarity. They were custom built at La Grange, Illinois by a team of 21 people. The locomotives emerged from the workshops towards the end of 1985 and arrived at Southampton on 21 January 1986.

They were the first privately owned diesel locomotives to operate regularly on the British main line, also the first diesel locomotives built for it in the United States, although EMD powered locomotives have been the mainstay in both the Republic of Ireland since 1961 and Northern Ireland since 1980. Following Foster Yeoman's example, rival ARC Southern ordered four Class 59/1 and National Power six Class 59/2s. Foster Yeoman and Amey merged their rail concerns into Mendip Rail, and the rail interests of National Power were taken over by English, Welsh and Scottish Railway (EWS).

The Class 59 was superseded by the Class 66. These locomotives were first built for EWS in 1998 and are now operated by most British and some European freight operators. This design uses the same body shell but it has some differences including a larger EMD 710 engine.

== Sub-classes ==
=== Class 59/0 for Foster Yeoman ===
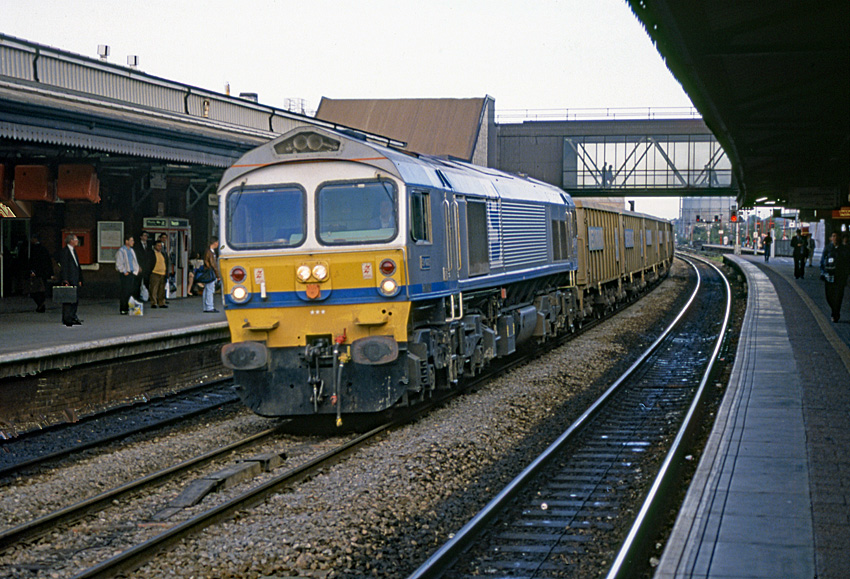
59003 Yeoman Highlander at Reading, 1992

The first order for four Class 59s was placed on 16 November 1984 and the locomotives arrived at Southampton on 21 January 1986. They were initially hauled to Merehead and then taken to the Railway Technical Centre at Derby for inspection. 59002 and 59004 returned to Merehead on 29 January to allow the training of drivers and maintenance staff and to prove the haulage capability on Foster Yeoman's tracks, also on the main line towards London when regular services were not running. The locomotives retained at Derby underwent further tests including on the Midland Main Line. The four locomotives started to haul regular trains on 17 February 1986. The locomotives were all named (Yeoman Endeavour, Yeoman Enterprise, Yeoman Highlander and Yeoman Challenger) in a ceremony at Merehead on 28 June 1986. At the same time EMD presented a non-working American-style locomotive bell which was fixed to special brackets above the front windows of 59001.

While the locomotives were owned by Foster Yeoman, the operation of trains on the main line was by British Rail drivers based at Westbury and Old Oak Common in London. Maintenance was at Foster Yeoman's Merehead depot but mostly carried out by British Rail staff from Bristol Bath Road depot.

The locomotives' livery was silver with a dark blue band along the lower panel of the roof (with 'Yeoman' in white at one end) and another blue band the base of the body side. British Rail required yellow on the ends below the window and on the buffer beam; above this was silver; the bottom blue line was carried around the end. A large 'Y' logo in blue was painted on a white background offset from the body centre. The number was carried on a cast plate below the drivers window (left side of the cab) and nameplates were fitted below the opposite cab window.

During the first year of operation, the first four locomotives travelled an average of 273,331 miles (439,884 km) each and hauled 2,843,310 tonnes (2,798,400 long tons) between them. Availability was 99.3% and they achieved 99.8% availability over their first ten years.

Increasing business resulted in a fifth locomotive being ordered in 1988. 59005 was built by EMD at La Grange and arrived in the UK at Felixstowe on 4 June 1989. It went to Derby for inspection and then entered service from Merehead on 19 June 1989. From October 1993, the five locomotives operated jointly with the ARC Southern Class 59/1s under the Mendip Rail agreement but remained the property of Foster Yeoman. In 1997, 59003 was withdrawn from Mendip Rail traffic and modified to work in Germany in a joint operation with DB Cargo.

=== Class 59/1 for ARC Southern ===
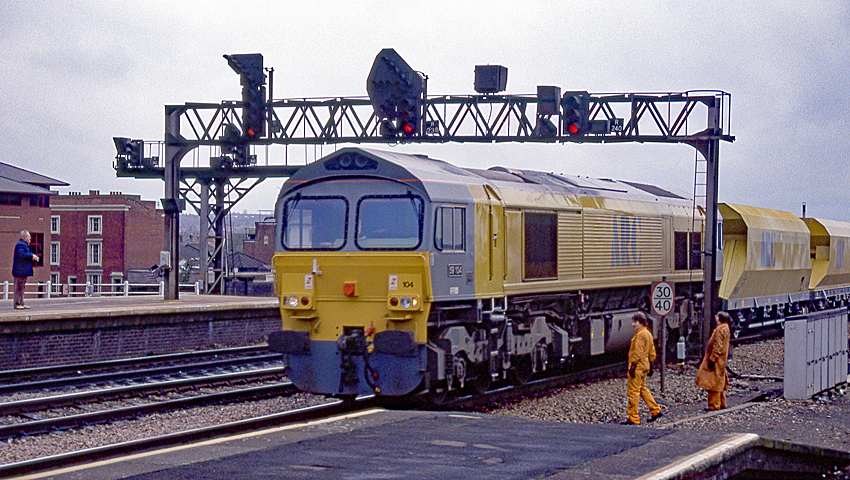
ARC 59104 Village of Great Elm at Reading, 1991

ARC Southern ordered four locomotives in 1987. Construction started in 1990 at EMD's Canadian plant in London, Ontario as La Grange was not building locomotives at the time. They arrived in the UK at Newport Docks and were unloaded on 20 October 1990. They were hauled to Whatley and then taken to Derby for inspection. The first locomotives entered service from Whatley on 5 November 1990.

The main differences from the 59/0s is a revised arrangement of lights on the front to a newer British standard. 59104 was experimentally fitted with additional yaw dampers inboard of the cab steps. It was successfully tested on the Midland Main Line at 75 miles per hour (121 km/h).

Livery was mustard yellow sides with grey roofs and cabs (but with signal yellow below the front windows), and a large grey ARC logo was positioned on the body side. The number was carried on a cast plate below the drivers window (left side of the cab) and nameplates were fitted below the opposite cab window. The names chosen were of four villages near Whatley.

From October 1993, the locomotives operated jointly with the Foster Yeoman Class 59/0s under the Mendip Rail agreement but remained the property of ARC Southern.

=== Class 59/2 for National Power ===
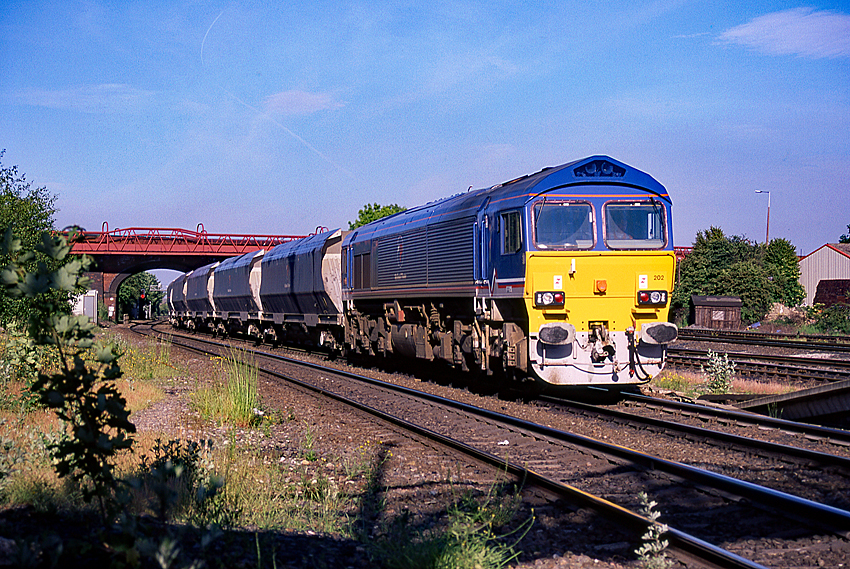
National Power 59202 Vale of White Horse at Knottingley in 1996

National Power ordered a single locomotive in 1991 to operate trains of limestone to Drax Power Station in Yorkshire. It was built by EMD at London, Ontario, and arrived in the UK at Hull on 17 February 1994. It was taken to Derby for inspection and entered service on 14 March 1994. Five more locomotives were ordered in 1994 for coal traffic. These arrived in Hull on 4 August 1995 and were based at a new National Power depot at Ferrybridge.

The six Class 59/2s have the same lighting arrangement as the 59/1s and are all equipped with the additional yaw dampers that were tested on 59104 which allows operation at up to 75 miles per hour (121 km/h). Other changes to earlier builds are a carbon dioxide fire control system (instead of a Halon system), Ni-Cad batteries (instead of lead acid), drop-head knuckle couplers, and a more advanced slow speed control for merry-go-round power station coal train operation.

Livery was a bright blue body with pale grey bogies, underframe and lower bodyside. Narrow white and red stripes ran along the side between the blue and grey. The fronts had signal yellow below the front windows with blue above. A white and red National Power logo was positioned in the centre of the sides. The number was painted below the drivers window (left side of the cab) and nameplates were fitted below the opposite cab window. 12 names of vales were selected to allow for fleet expansion but only five were used.

National Power ceased operating their own trains in April 1998 and the fleet was sold to English, Welsh and Scottish Railway who redeployed them on stone trains alongside Mendip Rail's 59/0s and 59/1s.

== Subsequent operators ==
=== Mendip Rail ===
To better manage the utilisation of their locomotives and wagons, ARC Southern and Foster Yeoman founded Mendip Rail in October 1993. The assets were still owned by each parent company and the staff were seconded. Class 59 maintenance was concentrated at Merehead, leaving the depot at Whatley to focus on wagons. Merehead also took on regular maintenance of DB Schenker's Class 59/2s from 2005.

Both the parent companies have seen changes, firstly ARC became Hanson Quarry Products Europe in 1998. Family-owned Foster Yeoman sold its business to Aggregate Industries on 21 June 2006.

59002 was repainted into Mendip Rail livery. This was mostly dark green but with an orange section below, angled downwards in the cab area. It had a grey band around the lower body, also a grey roof. The colours were carried across the front of the cab; only the buffer beam was painted signal yellow. An MRL logo was centred on the green body side with the company name below on the orange section. All other locomotives have continued to operate in their owning company's colours and 59002 reverted to Foster Yeoman's livery, but the style of painting changed and was generally similar irrespective of the owning company except for the Aggregates Industries scheme introduced in 2006.

- All Foster Yeoman locomotives had a mid-blue upper section with silver below. The end matched the body colours but with a signal yellow buffer beam. A blue 'Y' logo with a white background was positioned on the blue section of the sides, with 'Yeoman' in white on blue below it.
- ARC Southern locomotive 59101 was given a mustard yellow upper section with grey roof and lower body. The end matched the body colours but with a signal yellow buffer beam. A blue ARC logo was positioned in the centre of the yellow sides.
- After ARC became Hanson all locomotives were painted in a similar scheme to Foster Yeoman's except the main roof section was red. The Hanson logo and name was applied to the blue section of the sides.
- After Foster Yeoman was sold to Aggregate Industries all locomotives were given a different livery style. A thin silver band ran right around the locomotive just below window level. Above was mid blue and below was turquoise. The end matched the body colours but with a signal yellow buffer beam. A large silver triangle was painted on the side with a blue triangular logo at the top and the company's name in turquoise below.
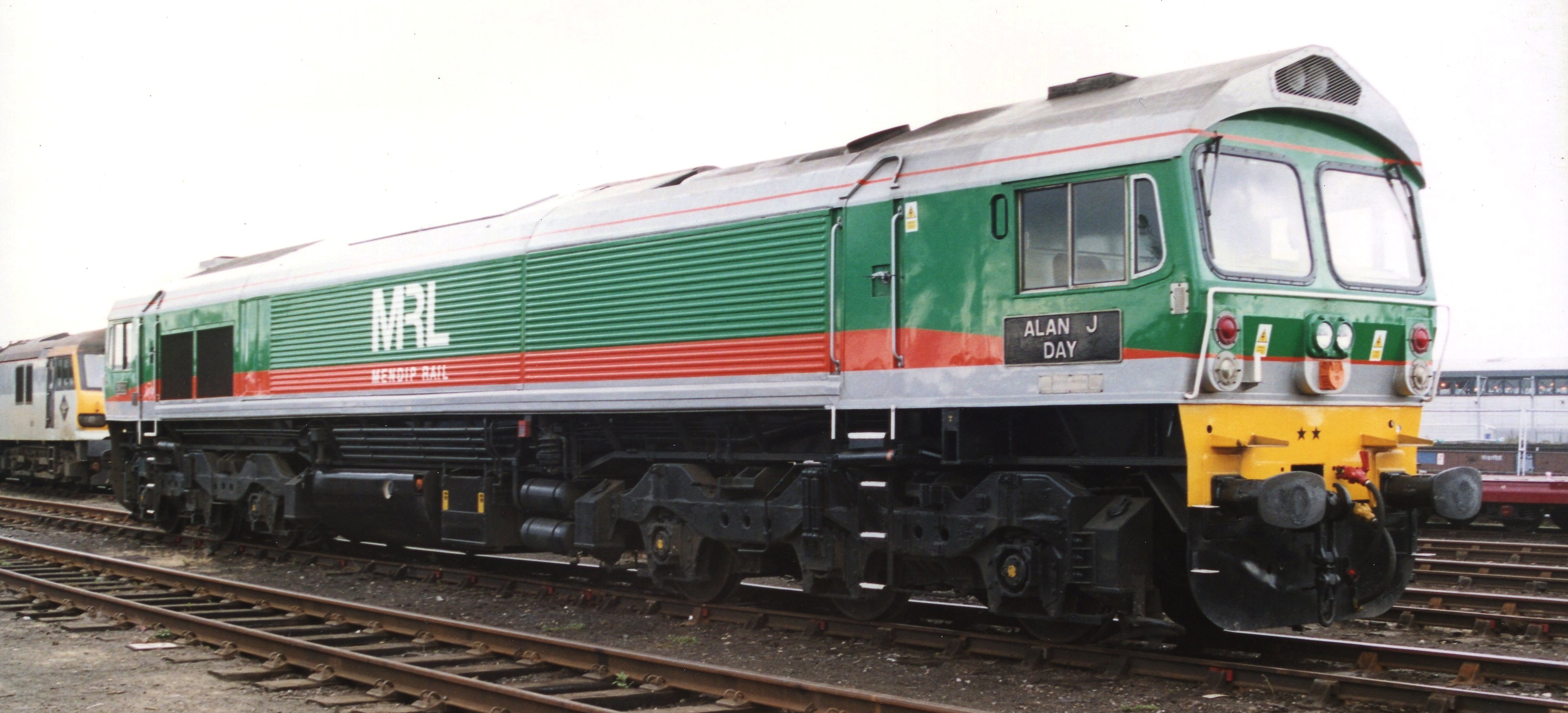
Mendip Rail 59002 (2000)

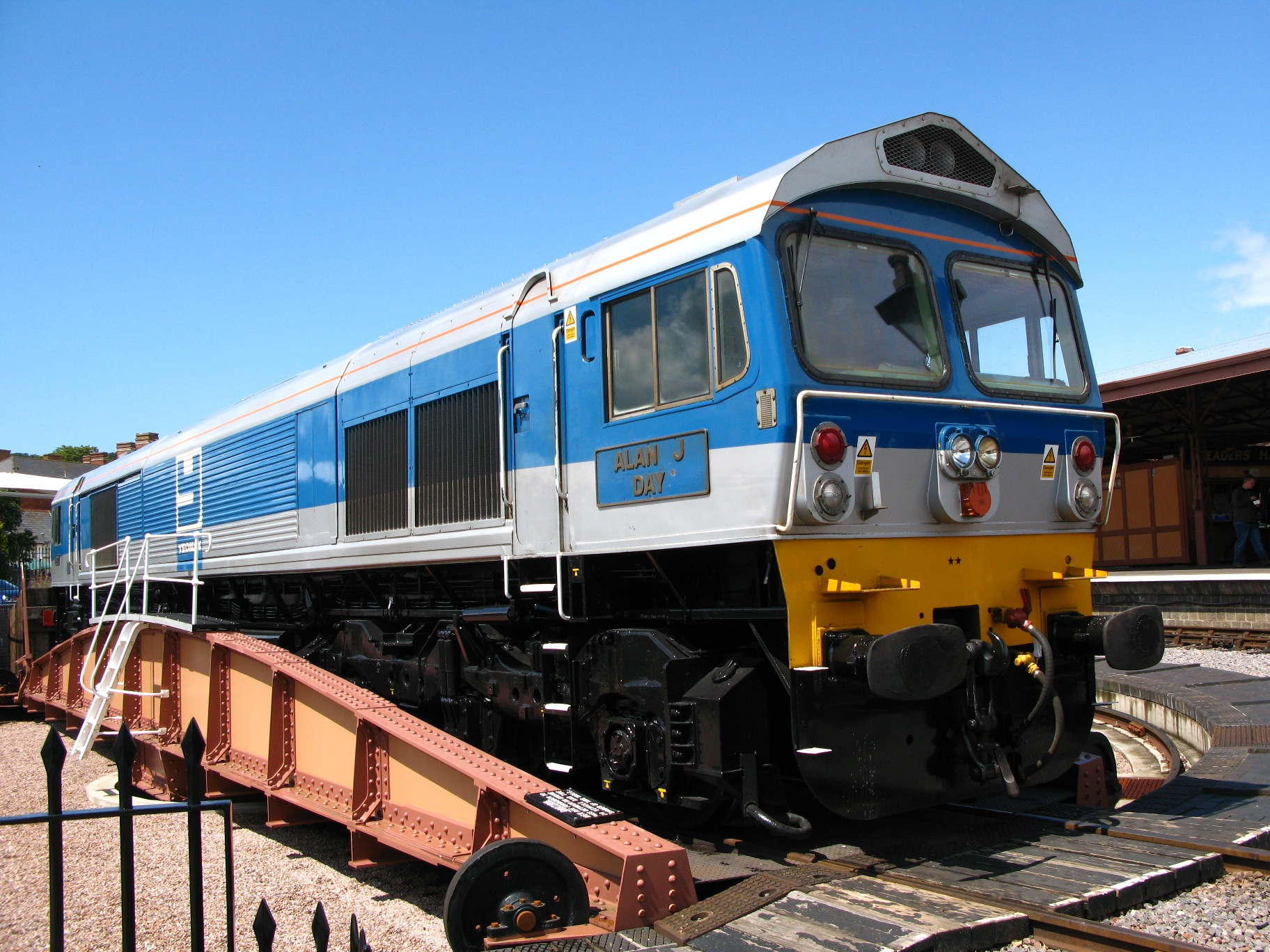
Foster Yeoman 59002 (2011)

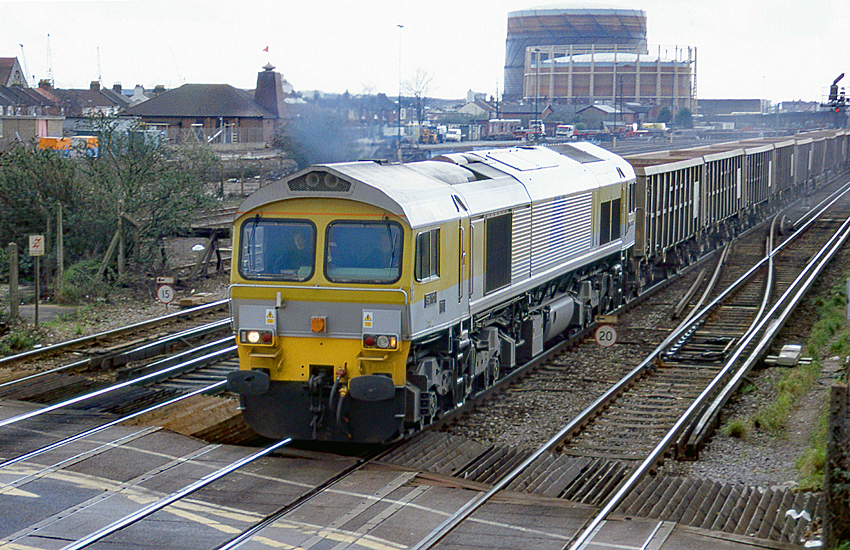
ARC 59101
(photograph 1999)

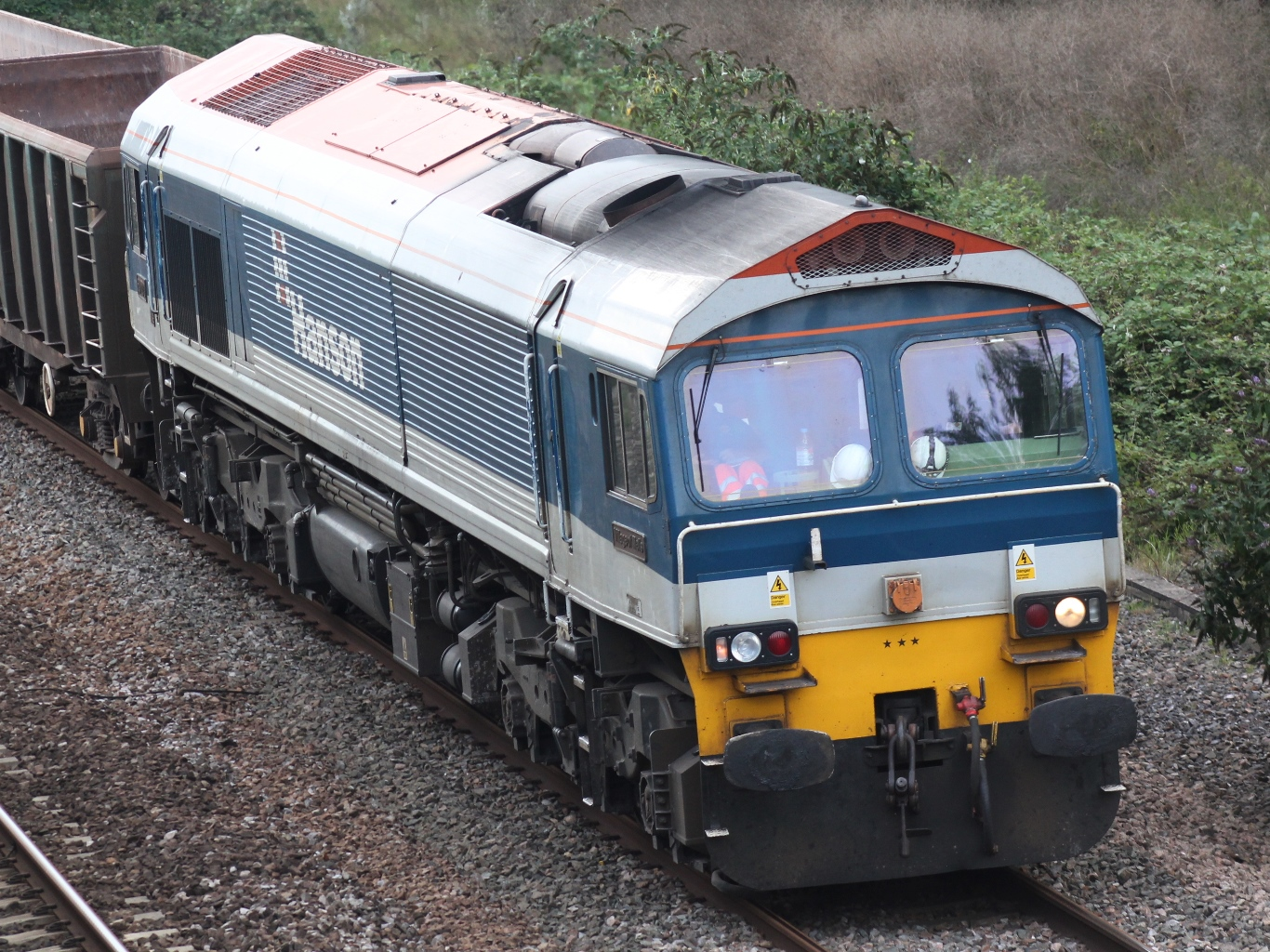
Hanson 59103 (2020)

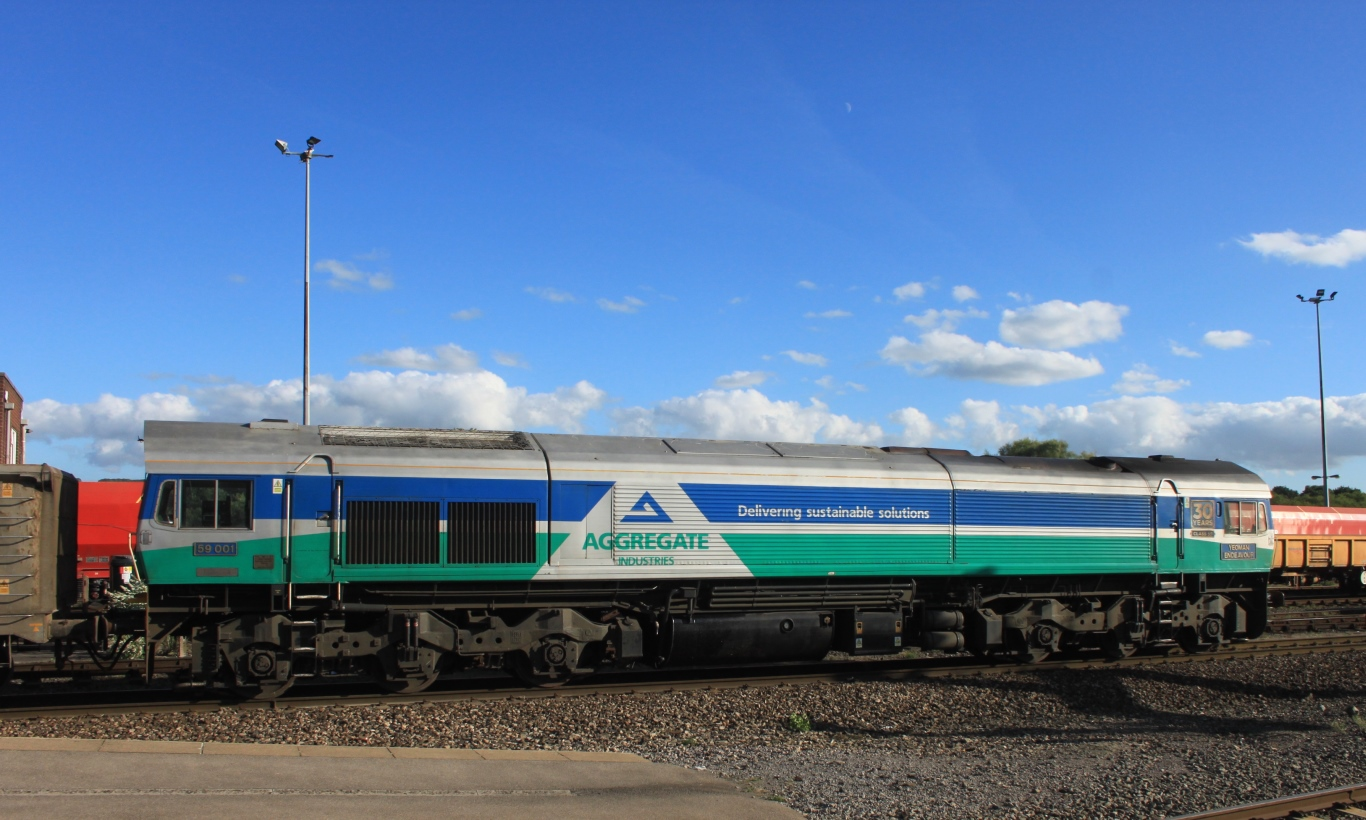
Aggregate Industries 59001 (2016)

Mendip Rail continued to contract the operation of their trains to British Rail. After this was privatised the contract was given to English, Welsh and Scottish Railway continued by DB Schenker Rail which later became DB Cargo UK following a change of ownership. This contract expired in 2019 and was awarded instead to Freightliner UK. The contract included the sale of the eight class 59s to Freightliner.

=== In Germany ===
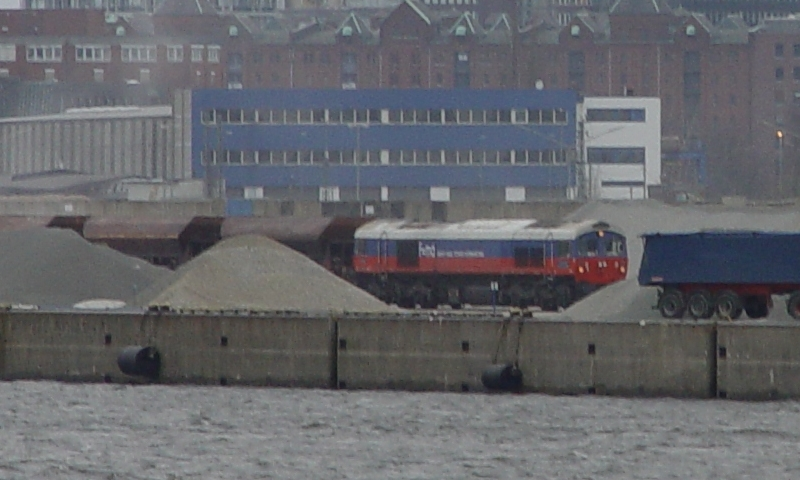
HHPI 259003 on Hamburg Kirchenpauerkai in 2007

Foster Yeoman sought contracts in Germany in the 1990s. In 1996 it was agreed that they could operate trains on German railways if they formed a joint venture with DB Cargo. 59003 Yeoman Highlander was taken out of Mendip Rail service on 29 November 1996 and modified for operating in Germany. The work was mostly done at Eastleigh Works but some was done after arrival in Germany, This included changes to cab controls, signalling equipment, radio, front lights and buffers. It was handed over to DB at Merehead on 1 March 1997 and left the UK through the Channel Tunnel on 1 May 1997. After testing by DB at Minden and further modifications at Cottbus it entered service on 14 September 1997 from a depot in Berlin. It initially worked trains of sand near its depot and then heavier stone trains between Berlin and Hamburg. From March 1998 it carried the number 259003-2.

The DB-Yeoman operation finished in 1999. 259003-2 was transferred to a new company, Heavy Haul Power International (HHPI), which had been set up as an open access rail freight haulier. This had been established by Richard Painter who had worked with Foster Yeoman and had led the DB-Yeoman joint venture. The new company received an operating license in May 2000 which allows operation in Germany and other countries.

HHPI withdrew 259003-2 in August 2014. It was sold to GB Railfreight and returned to the UK. It arrived at the Port of Immingham in October 2014 and taken to Eastleigh for overhaul and modifications to allow it to operate in Britain. It ran its first tests on the main line on 29 May 2015, now again numbered 59003.

Throughout its time in Germany it carried a livery with Foster Yeoman blue at the top of the sides and ends with DB red below, the red area being slightly smaller than the blue. The roof was grey while the buffer beam and area below the body was black. It retained its name and numberplates. A red DB logo was on the blue section and a blue Yeoman 'Y' on the red section. HHPI removed this and puts its logo and name on the blue section.

=== GB Railfreight ===
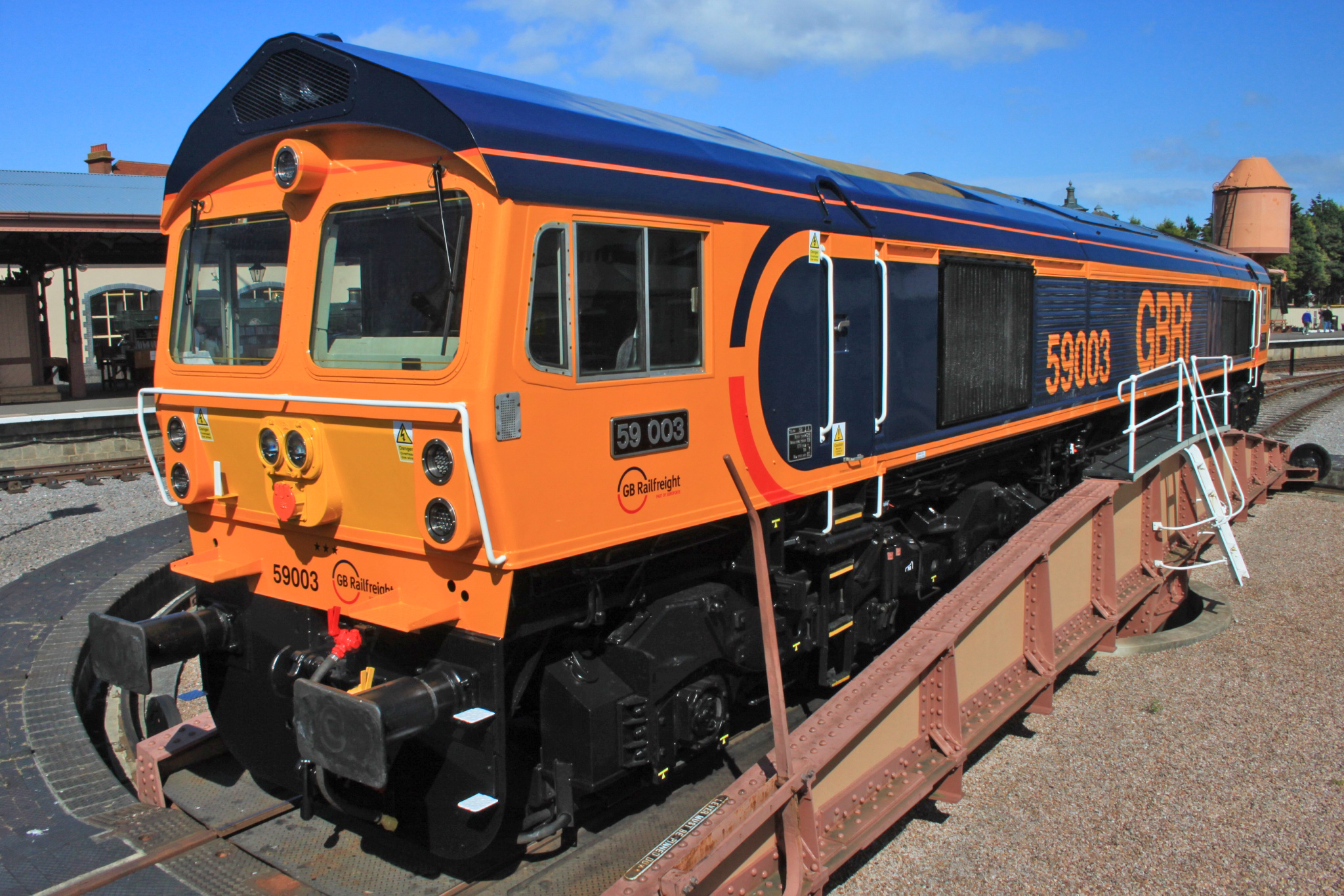
59003 Yeoman Highlander is now working for GB Railfreight

59003 was purchased by GB Railfreight from HHPI in August 2014. It was repatriated back to Great Britain from Germany via the Port of Immingham in October 2014 and then moved by rail to Eastleigh Works for recommissioning by Arlington Fleet Services. As of September 2020, it is principally used on general freight in the Westbury area where the other Class 59s operate stone trains.

GB Railfreight livery is dark blue with orange on the cab and orange bands along the top and bottom of the body sides. The lower part of the cab front is deep yellow but the buffer beam and other parts below the body are black. A 'GBRf' logo and number are orange on the blue body side. In 2015 the border between the orange and blue was immediately behind the cab side windows and semi-circular mimicking the Europorte logo with a red quarter circle. In 2020 this was changed to a straight line with the orange area extended back to include the doors.

=== EWS and DB ===
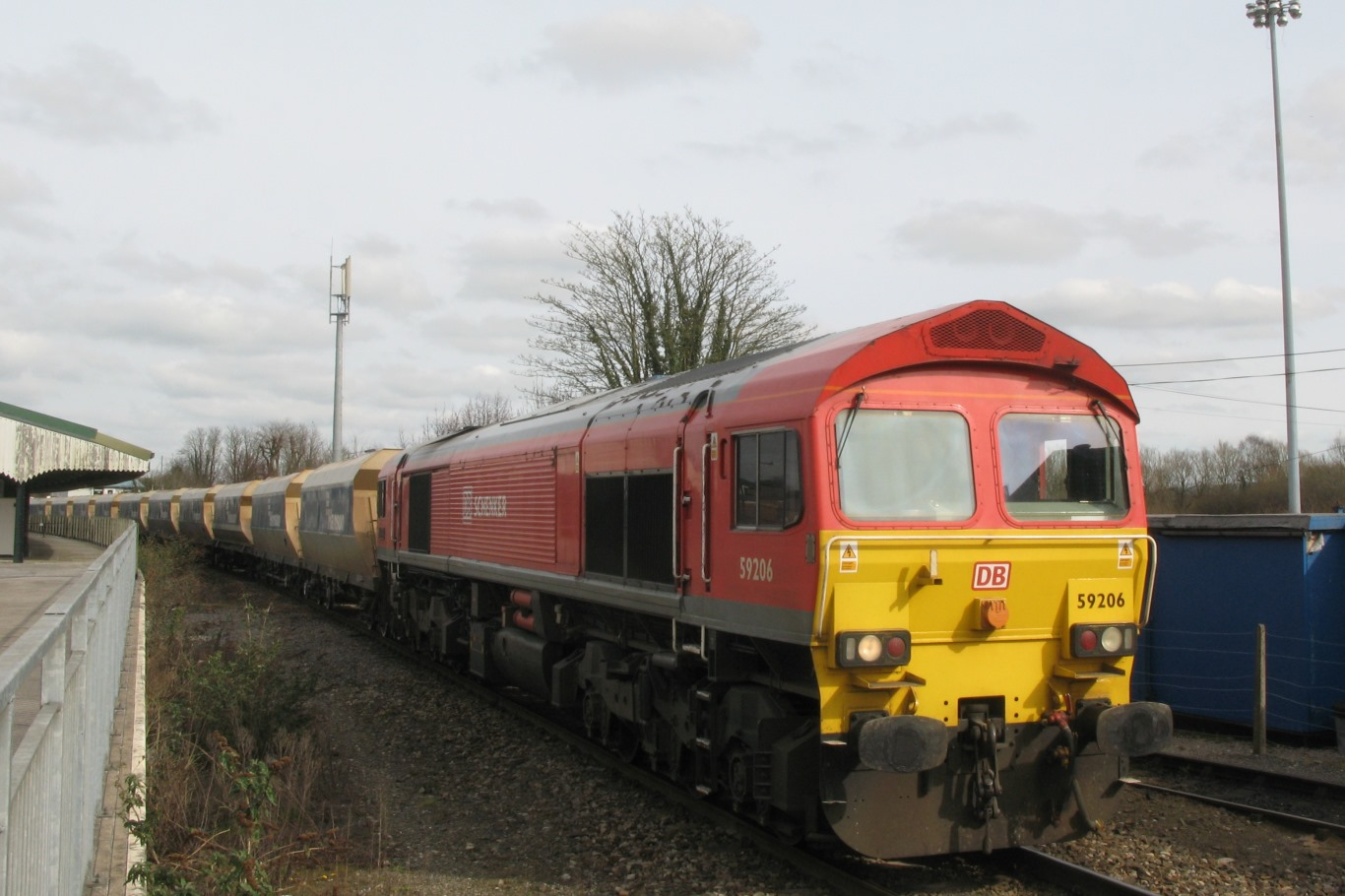
59206 John F Yeoman at Westbury with a train for Whatley quarry

The contract for British Rail to provide crews and additional motive power for Mendip Rail trains was transferred to English, Welsh & Scottish Railway (EWS) on 24 February 1996 when that company took over most of BR's freight services at privatisation.

National Power sold its rail operations to EWS in April 1998. They were repainted into the EWS livery of maroon with a broad, straight yellow band along the bodyside. The number and 'EWS' were in maroon on the yellow band while the EWS logo was applied beneath the right side cab window. This forced a move for any nameplates to below the driver's side cab window.

The Class 59/2s were later allocated to work beside the Mendip Rail fleet of 59/0s and 59/1s. From 2005 a contract was given to Mendip Rail to maintain the Class 59/2s at Merehead alongside their own locomotives.

EWS was sold to Deutsche Bahn (DB) on 28 June 2007. It traded as DB Schenker until 2 March 2016 when it was rebranded as DB Cargo UK. The locomotives were now painted in DB red with white DB branding. The number was painted below the right side cab window.

When DB Cargo lost the Mendip Rail contract in 2019 they put their Class 59/2s up for sale and Freightliner purchased them to operate on their stone trains.

=== Freightliner and Heavy Haul Rail ===
DB Cargo UK's contract to operate the Mendip Rail stone trains expired in 2019 and was awarded instead to Freightliner. The new contract included the sale of Mendip Rail's eight class 59s to Freightliner. With their work gone DB put the six Class 59/2s up for sale and they were also purchased by Freightliner who continued to operate them on these stone trains.

The first Class 59 to be painted into Freightliner livery was 59206. The main colour on the body side is orange which extends from the lower roof panel down to the bottom of the cab side window. Below this is a black stripe, an orange stripe, another black stripe and finally a lemon yellow stripe along the bottom of the body. The roof is grey, buffer beam and below the body black, and the whole front is lemon yellow. The number is painted on the lower black stripe below the right side cab window and the nameplate moved to above the upper black stripe and offset from the centre of the body.

After Freightliner sold its intermodal container business to CMA CGM in January 2026, all 14 moved to Heavy Haul Rail.

== Fleet details ==
Commissioned by	Number	Works No.	Built	In service	Owner	Image
Foster Yeoman	59001	848002-1	1985	February 1986	Heavy Haul Rail	50001 in Aggregates Industries livery, 2016
Foster Yeoman	59002	848002-2	1985	February 1986	Heavy Haul Rail	59002 in Aggregates Industries livery, 2022
Foster Yeoman	59003	848002-3	1985	February 1986	GB Railfreight	59003 in G B Railfreight livery, 2021
Foster Yeoman	59004	848002-4	1985	February 1986	Heavy Haul Rail	59004 in Aggregates Industries livery, 2025
Foster Yeoman	59005	878039-1	1989	June 1989	Heavy Haul Rail	59005 in Aggregates Industries livery, 2021
ARC Southern	59101	878029-1	1990	11 November 1990	Heavy Haul Rail	59101 in Heidelberg Materials livery, 2024
ARC Southern	59102	878029-2	1990	11 November 1990	Heavy Haul Rail	59102 in Freightliner livery, 2024
ARC Southern	59103	878029-3	1990	11 November 1990	Heavy Haul Rail	59103 in Hanson livery, 2021
ARC Southern	59104	878029-4	1990	11 November 1990	Heavy Haul Rail	59104 in Freightliner livery, 2024
National Power	59201	918273-1	1994	26 April 1994	Heavy Haul Rail	59201 in Freightliner livery, 2025
National Power	59202	948510-1	1995	October 1995	Heavy Haul Rail	59202 in Freightliner livery, 2024
National Power	59203	948510-2	1995	October 1995	Heavy Haul Rail	59203 in DB Cargo livery, 2017
National Power	59204	948510-3	1995	October 1995	Heavy Haul Rail	59204 in Freightliner livery, 2025
National Power	59205	948510-4	1995	October 1995	Heavy Haul Rail	59205 in DB red but no logos, 2021
National Power	59206	948510-5	1995	October 1995	Heavy Haul Rail	59202 in Freightliner livery, 2024

=== Names ===
Number	Name	Where and when named	Name removed
59001	Yeoman Endeavour	28 June 1986 at Torr Works, Merehead	
59002	Yeoman Enterprise	28 June 1986 at Torr Works, Merehead	June 1996
59002	Alan J Day	21 June 1996 at Torr Works, Merehead	
59003	Yeoman Highlander	28 June 1986 at Torr Works, Merehead	
59004	Yeoman Challenger	28 June 1986 at Torr Works, Merehead	June 1996
59004	Paul A Hammond	21 June 1996 at Torr Works, Merehead	
59005	Kenneth J Painter	25 June 1989 at Torr Works, Merehead	
59101	Village of Whatley	9 May 1992 at Bridgnorth	
59102	Village of Chantry	15 September 1991 at Laira T&RSMD	
59103	Village of Mells	18 August 1991 at Old Oak Common TMD	
59104	Village of Great Elm	14 September 1991 at Cambridge T&RSMD	
59201	Vale of York	4 March 1994 at the National Railway Museum	March 2012
59201	Westbury PSB 1984 - 2024	June 2024 at Cranmore, on the East Somerset Railway	
59202	Vale of White Horse	14 June 1996 at Didcot Power Station	November 2013
59202	Alan Meadows Taylor	December 2013	
59203	Vale of Pickering	2 September 1995 at Drax Power Station	Circa July 2014
59204	Vale of Glamorgan	18 November 1996 at Aberthaw Power Station	Circa September 2018
59205	Vale of Evesham	14 June 1996 at Ferrybridge Power Station	March 1998
59205	L Keith McNair	12 March 1998	April 2012
59206	Pride of Ferrybridge	28 June 1997 at Ferrybridge Power Station	December 2008
59206	John F Yeoman	January 2009	

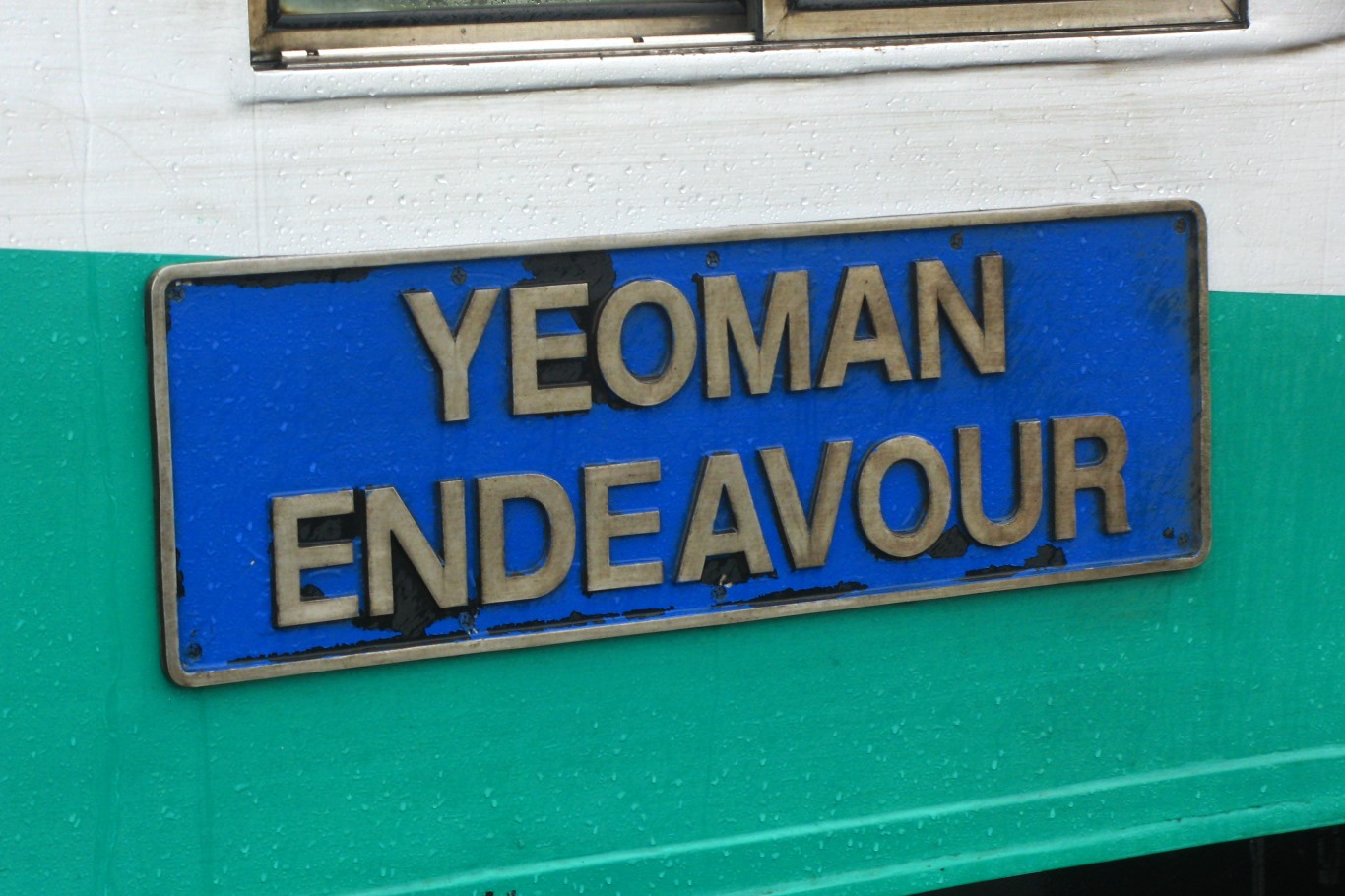
Yeoman Endeavour (59001)

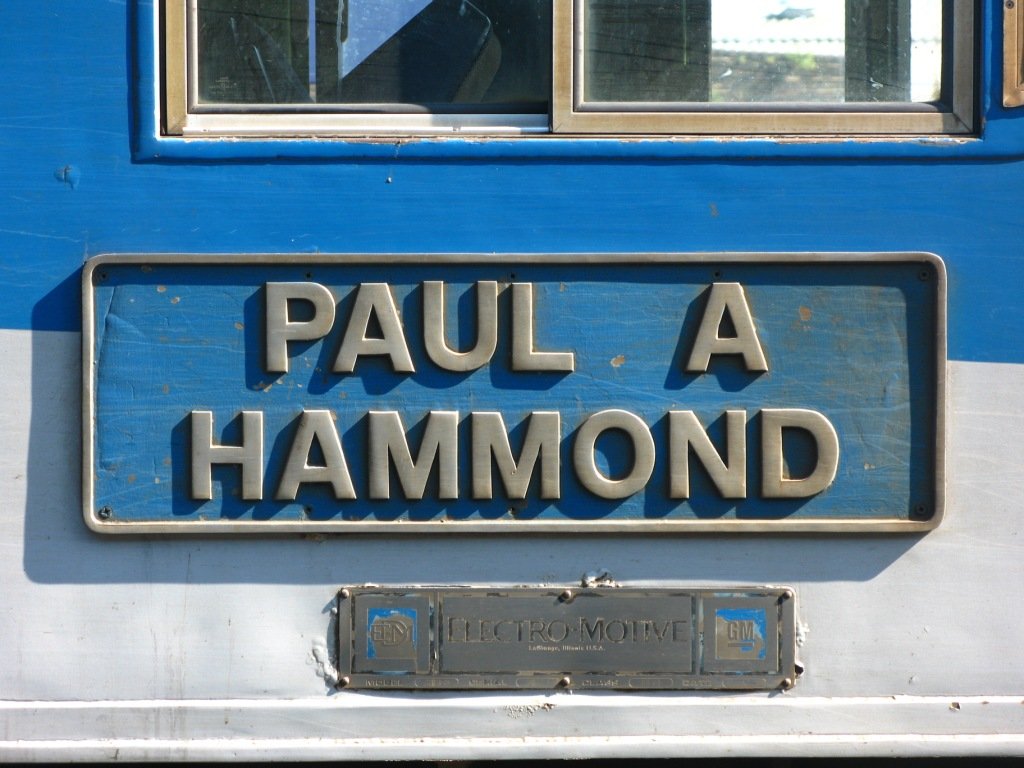
Paul A Hammond (59004)

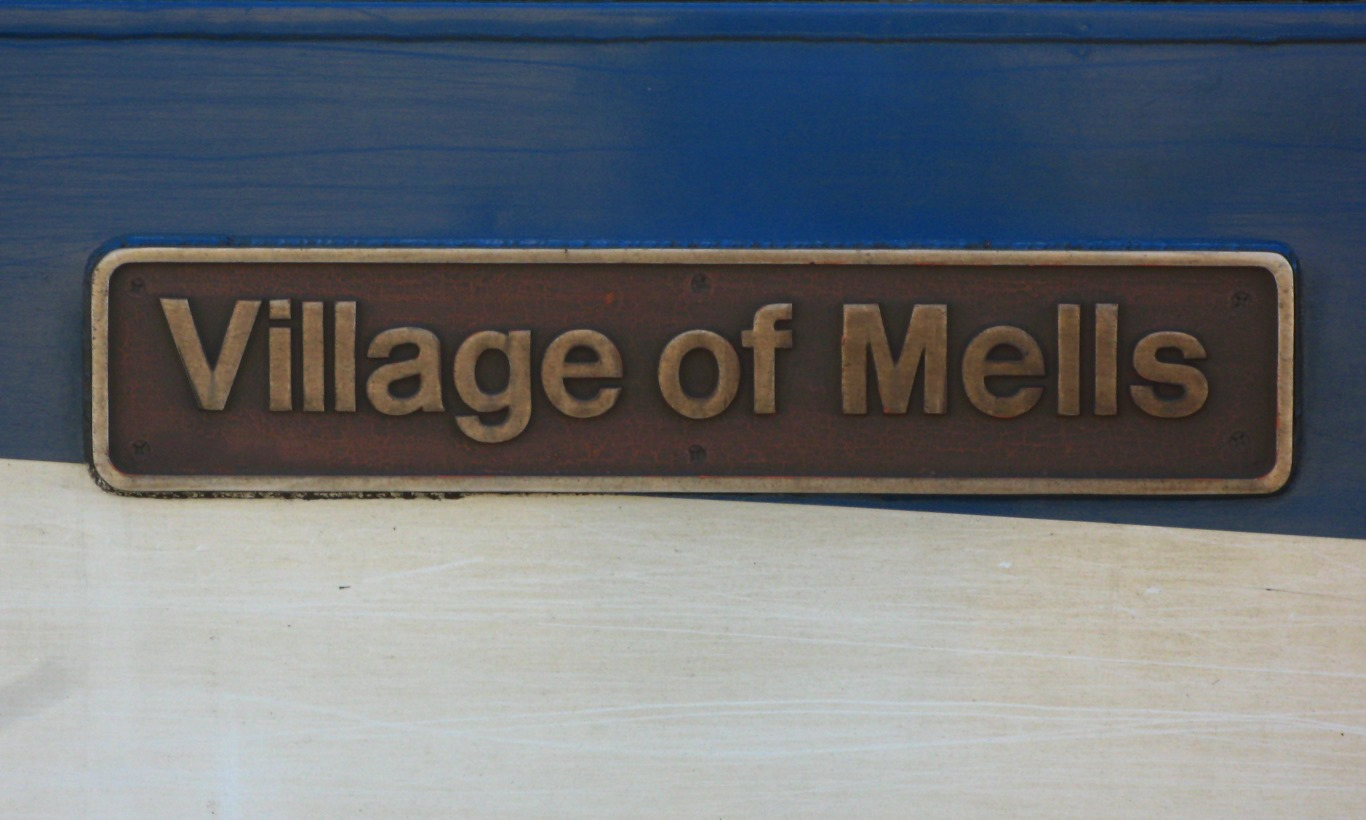
Village of Mells (59103)

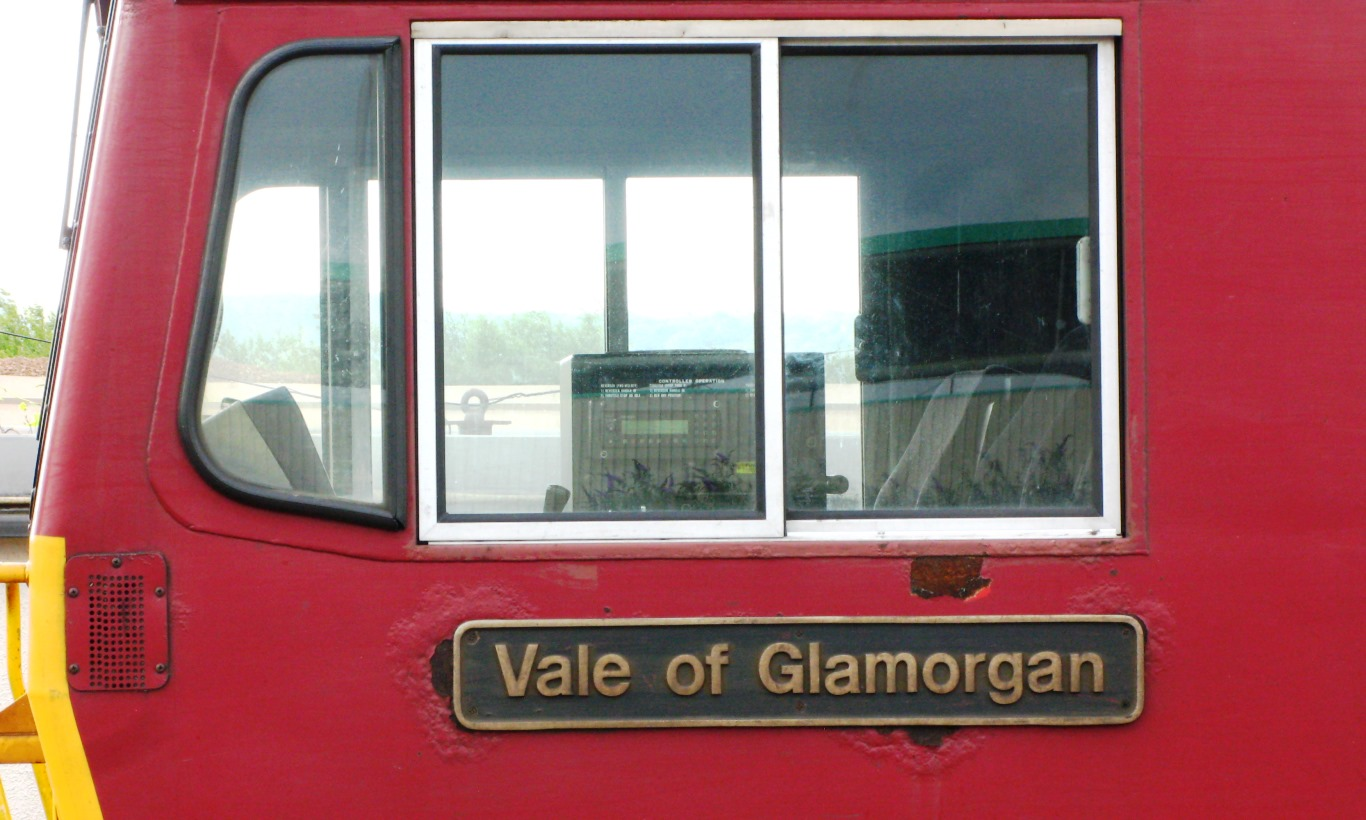
Vale of Glamorgan (59204)

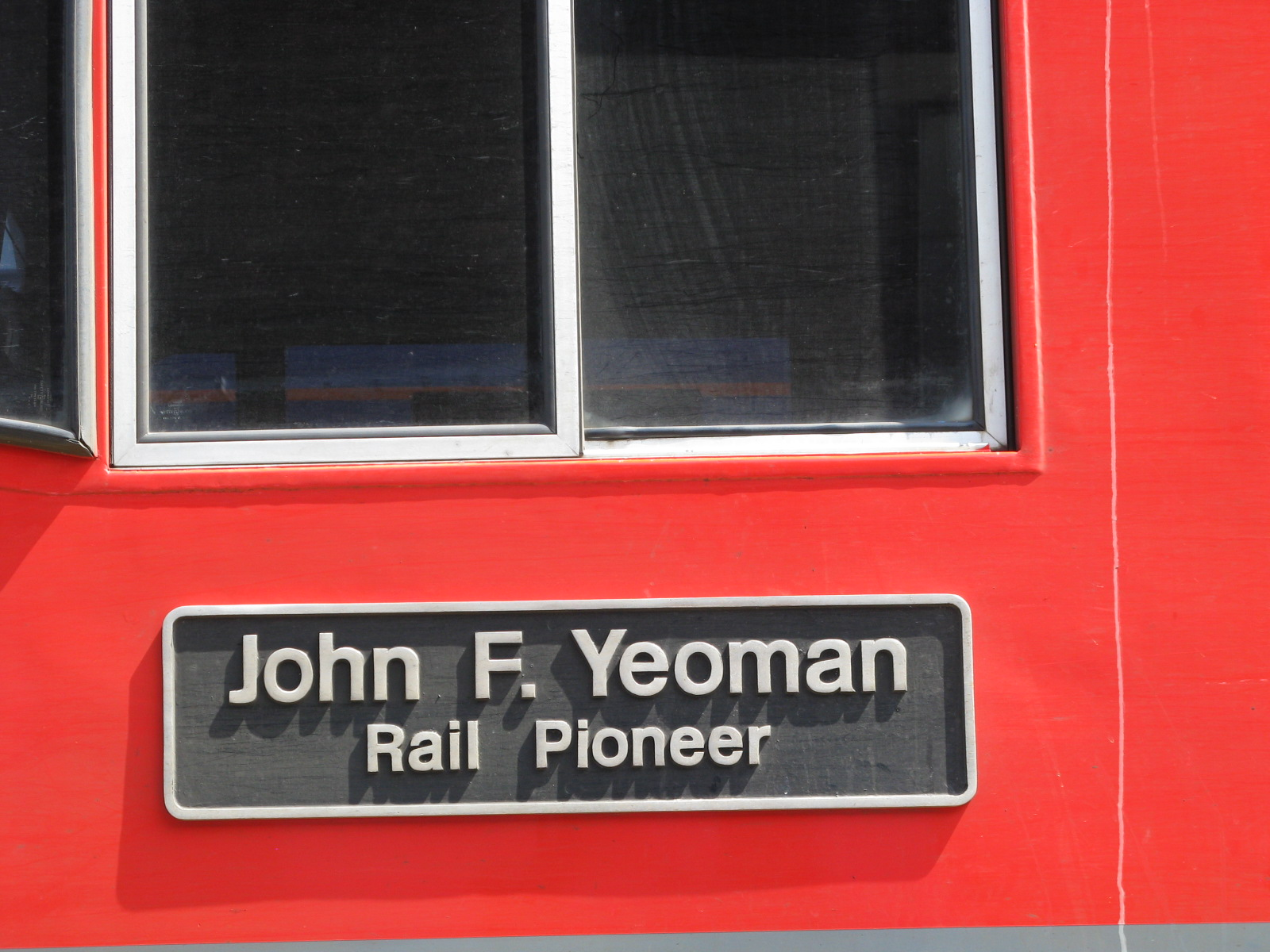
John F Yeoman (59206)

== Notable workings and incidents ==
=== 1990 derailment in Canada ===
One of the ARC Southern locomotives was damaged while being tested before delivery. On 13 September 1990 two locomotives were being tested on EMD's test track at London, Ontario. 59102 failed to stop at the end of the line and ran through a trap point which protected the exit to the main line. It derailed and came to a stop at an angle on the embankment. It was recovered and returned to the factory where it was repaired.

=== 1991 mega-train trial ===
A trial was held on the night of 25/26 May 1991 to test the operation of longer trains from Merehead. The train consisted of 115 wagons weighing 12,108 tonnes (11,917 long tons; 13,347 short tons) and 5,415 feet (1,650 m) long. 59005 was at the front and 59001 positioned as a mid-train helper. It was worked to the junction with the main line at Witham Friary in two parts. 59001 buffer-locked with a wagon which derailed. Later in the journey a coupling broke. The trial was halted but concluded that such a 'mega-train' could be operated subject to some modifications. A commemorative plaque was later fitted to 59005.

=== 2000 Whatley branch derailment ===
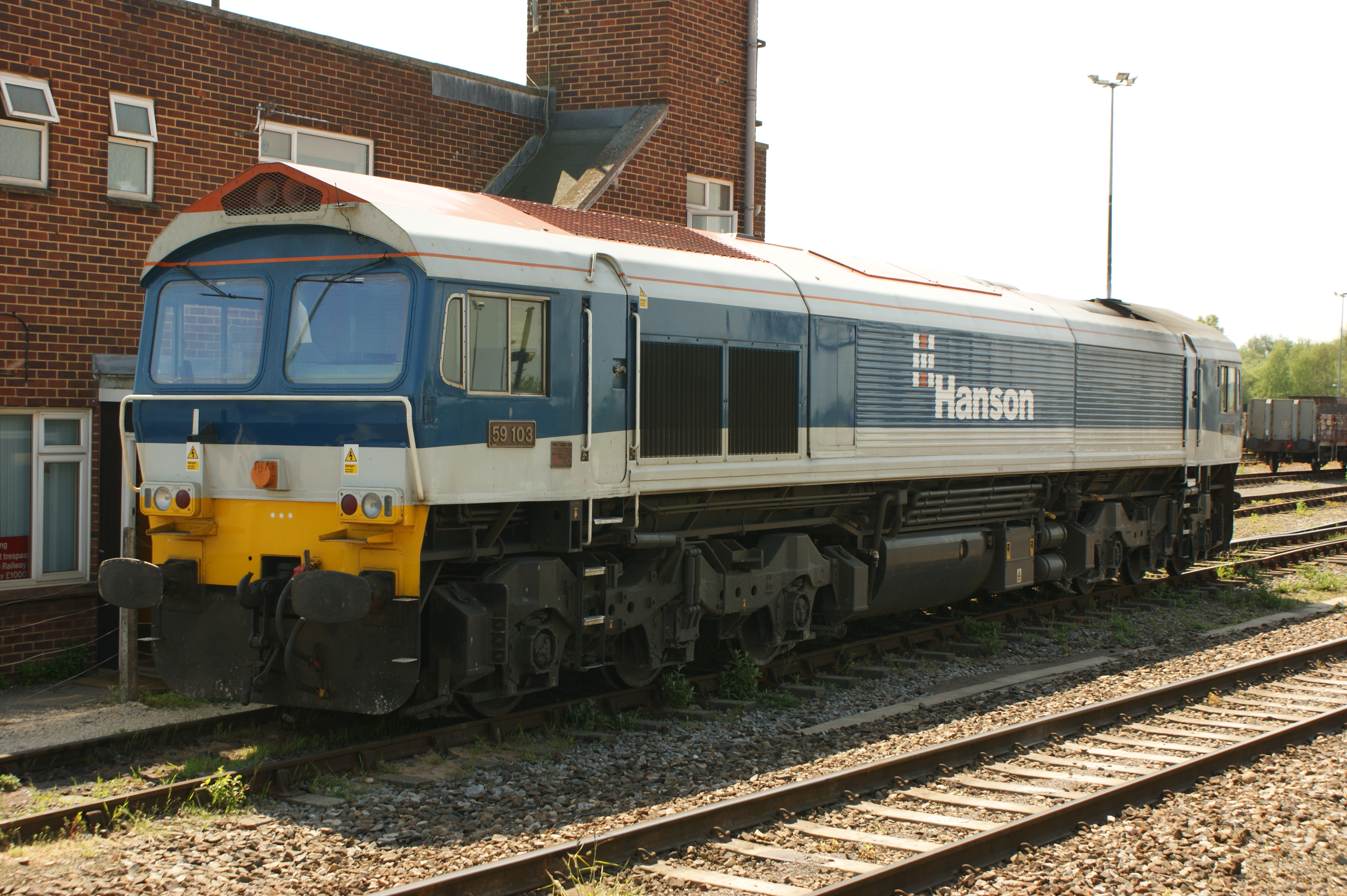
59103, the only Class 59 to have been seriously damaged in an accident when it derailed near Whatley in 2000. (2008)

The only Class 59 to be significantly damaged in an accident is 59103 (Note: 59101 was hauling a train at Southall on 19 September 1997 when its wagons were struck by an InterCity 125 train which had passed signals at danger. The Class 59 was not involved or damaged. See Southall rail crash.) which was working a Whatley to Acton stone train on 12 September 2000 when the first ten hopper wagons derailed at 23:20 between Great Elm Tunnel and Bedlam Tunnel on the single track branch line to the Hanson Quarry at Whatley. The locomotive and the first two hoppers rolled over with the locomotive coming to rest on the parapet of a small bridge. The locomotive was recovered on 19 September 2000 and moved to Whatley where an initial assessment of the damage was made and repairs made to make the locomotive safe for removal by road. The locomotive was then moved by road to the Railway Technical Centre at Derby on 2 November 2000 for further assessment. It was then taken to Eastleigh Works for repairs. 59103 returned to service in the summer of 2001.

== Models ==
Modern Traction Kits quickly released a white metal body kit which fitted on a 00 gauge Hornby Railways Class 58 chassis. When the Class 59/1s entered service an alternative kit was made available with the revised light arrangements. Lima later produced a ready-to-run model until 2004 when the company ceased trading. Hornby Railways acquired the moulds and launched its first version of the Class 59 in 2006. It was upgraded with a better mechanism and featured the later arrangement of cab front lights. Since 2017 they have produced a basic representation of the prototype as part of their Railroad range in a variety of liveries.

An N gauge body kit has been produced by BH Enterprises. A hand-built ready-to-run model has been offered by CJM Models. Prototype Replica Model Railway Products produce an 0 scale Class 59 in both kit form and ready-to-run.

== See also ==
- List of EMD locomotives
