= Economy of Somerset =

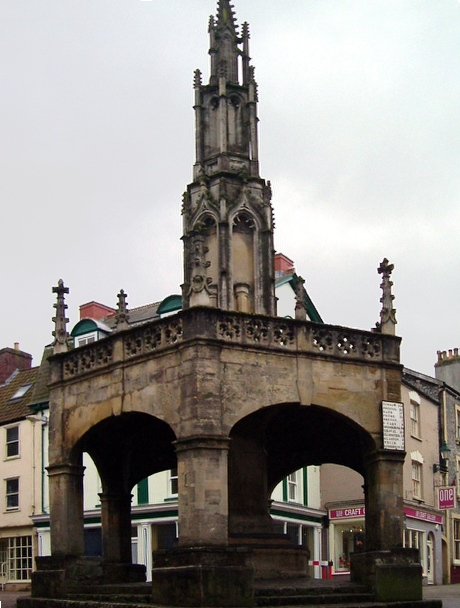
The Market cross in Shepton Mallet

Somerset is a county in the south west of England. It is a rural county and transport infrastructure has been significant in industrial development. There is some heavy industry particularly related to the defence technologies and the county has several centres for stone quarrying, although the coalfield is now closed.

Agriculture and textile production continue to provide employment along with tourism.

== Industry ==
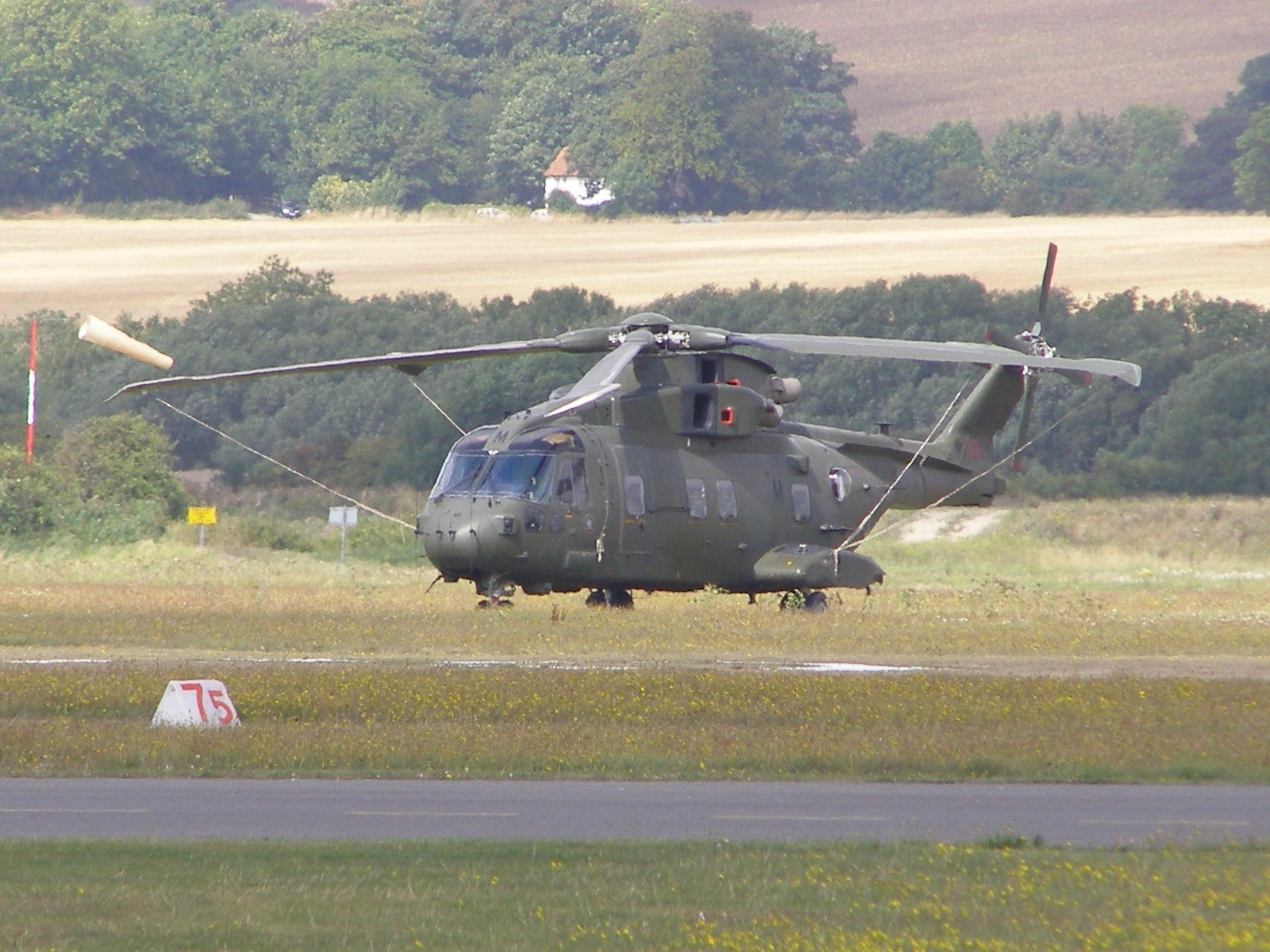
AgustaWestland EH101 manufactured by AgustaWestland in Yeovil

Somerset has few industrial centres. Bridgwater was developed during the Industrial Revolution as the West Country's leading port. The River Parrett was navigable by large ships as far as Bridgwater. By then loading the cargoes onto smaller boats at Langport Quay, next to the Bridgwater Bridge, they could be carried further up river to Langport. The Parrett is now only navigable as far as Dunball Wharf; and the wharf is still in use today to unload marine gravels and sands. Bridgwater, in the 19th and 20th centuries, was a centre for the manufacture of bricks and clay roof tiles, Bath bricks and later cellophane, but those industries have now closed. With its good links to the motorway system, Bridgwater has developed as a distribution hub for companies such as Argos, Toolstation and Gerber Juice.

The Somerset Levels has historically been a large producer of peat, but ecological concerns have led to the search for alternative materials for applications, such as potting of plants.

AgustaWestland manufacture helicopters in Yeovil. Helicopters were also built at Weston-super-Mare; it is now the home of a helicopter museum - The Helicopter Museum. Normalair Garratt, who built aircraft oxygen systems, are also based in the town; the company is now part of Honeywell Aerospace.

Many towns have encouraged small-scale light industries, such as Crewkerne's Ariel Motor Company, one of the UK's smallest car manufacturers.

== Defence industries ==
Somerset was, and is, an important supplier of equipment and technology to support the defence of United Kingdom. A Royal Ordnance Factory, ROF Bridgwater was built at the start of the Second World War, between the villages of Puriton and Woolavington, to manufacture explosives; and in 2007 is still operating, at a much reduced output, as part of BAE Systems Land Systems and is due to close completely in 2008. Templecombe has Thales Underwater Systems; and Taunton presently has the United Kingdom Hydrographic Office and Avimo, which became part of Thales Optics. It has been announced twice, in 2006 and 2007, that manufacturing is to end at Thales Optics' Taunton site, but the Trade Unions and Taunton Deane District Council are working to reverse or mitigate these decisions. Bath had Ministry of Defence offices across several parts of the city but these had closed and transferred to Filton's Abbey Wood site near Bristol by March 2013; and Norton Fitzwarren is the home of 40 Commando. Other high-technology companies include the optics company Gooch and Housego, at Ilminster.

== Agriculture and food and drink ==
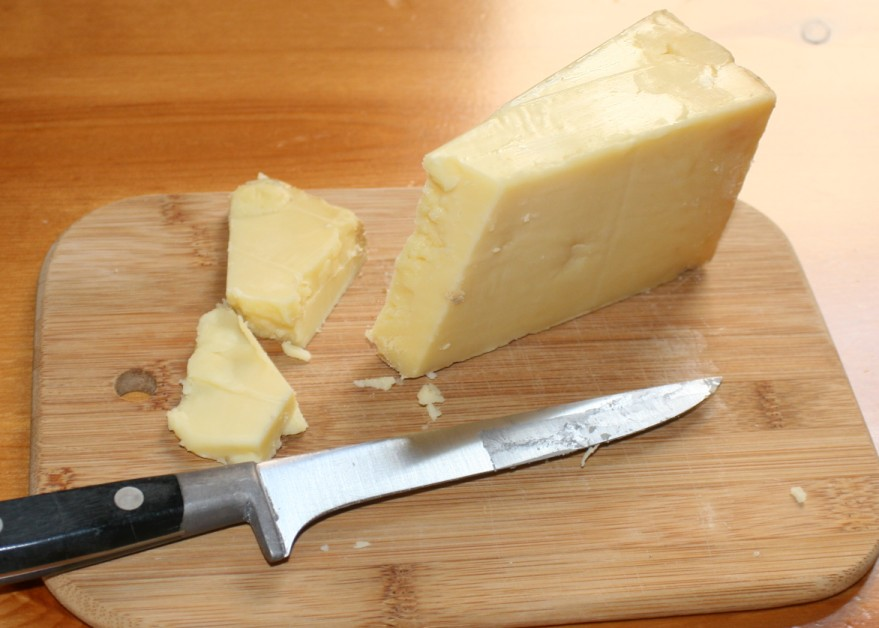
Cheddar cheese

Agriculture and food and drink production continue to be major industries in the county, employing over 15,000 people. Apple orchards were once plentiful, and Somerset is still a major producer of cider. The towns of Taunton and Shepton Mallet are involved with the production of cider, especially Blackthorn Cider, which is sold nationwide, and there are specialist producers such as Sheppy's Cider Burrow Hill Cider Farm and Thatchers Cider. Gerber Products Company in Bridgwater are the largest producer of fruit juices in Europe, producing brands such as 'Sunny Delight' and 'Ocean Spray'. Development of the milk-based industries, such as Yeo Valley Organic, has resulted in the production of ranges of desserts, yoghurts and cheeses, including Cheddar cheese – some of which has the West Country Farmhouse Cheddar PDO.

== Clothing ==
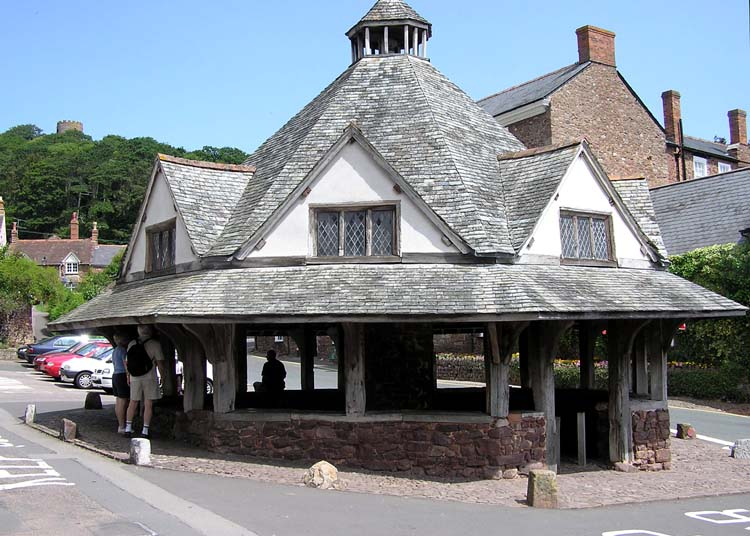
The Dunster Yarn Market was built in 1609 for the trading of local cloth.

Towns such as Castle Cary and Frome grew around the medieval weaving industry. Street developed as a centre for the production of woollen slippers and, later, boots and shoes, with C&J Clark establishing its headquarters in the town. C&J Clark's shoes are no longer manufactured there as the work was transferred to lower-wage areas in Asia, such as China. Instead, in 1993, redundant factory buildings were converted to form Clarks Village, the first purpose built factory outlet in the UK. C&J Clark also had shoe factories, at one time at Bath, Bridgwater and Minehead, to provide employment outside of the main summer tourist season, but these satellite sites had been closed, in the late 1980s, before the main site at Street. Dr. Martens shoes were also made in Somerset, by the Northampton-based R. Griggs Group, using redundant skilled shoemakers from C&J Clark; this work has also been transferred to Asia.

== Mining and quarrying ==
Coal mining was an important industry in north Somerset during the 18th and 19th centuries, and by 1800 it was prominent in Radstock. The Somerset Coalfield reached its peak production by the 1920s. All the pits have now been closed, the last in 1973. Most of the surface buildings have been removed, and apart from a winding wheel outside Radstock Museum, little evidence of their former existence remains. Further west, the Brendon Hills were mined for iron ore in the late 19th century; this was taken by the West Somerset Mineral Railway to Watchet Harbour for shipment to the furnaces at Ebbw Vale in south Wales.

The county has a long tradition of supplying freestone and building stone. Quarries at Doulting supplied the freestone used in the construction of Wells Cathedral. Bath stone is also widely used. Ralph Allen promoted its use in the early 18th century, but it was used locally long before then. It was mined underground at Combe Down and Bathampton Down Mines, and as a result of cutting the Box Tunnel, at various locations in Wiltshire, including Box. Bath stone is still used today, on a reduced scale; but more often as a cladding, rather than a structural material.

Further south, Hamstone is the colloquial name given to stone from Ham Hill, which is also widely used in the construction industry.

Blue Lias has been used locally as a building stone; and as a raw material for lime mortar and Portland cement. Puriton up to the 1960s had Blue Lias stone quarries, as did several other Polden Villages. Its quarries also supplied a Lime mortar and Portland cement factory at Dunball, adjacent to the King's Sedgemoor Drain. Its derelict, early 20th century, remains were removed when the M5 motorway was constructed in the mid-1970s. Keinton Mandeville was also heavily involved in quarrying; the village's quarries are now abandoned, but they are still remembered in the name of a Public House. Quarrying of blue lias is still undertaken at Charlton Mackrell and Charlton Adam.

Since the 1920s, the county has supplied aggregates. Foster Yeoman is Europe's large supplier of limestone aggregates, with quarries at Merehead Quarry. It has a dedicated railway operation, Mendip Rail, which is used to transport aggregates by rail from a group of Mendip quarries.

== Tourism ==
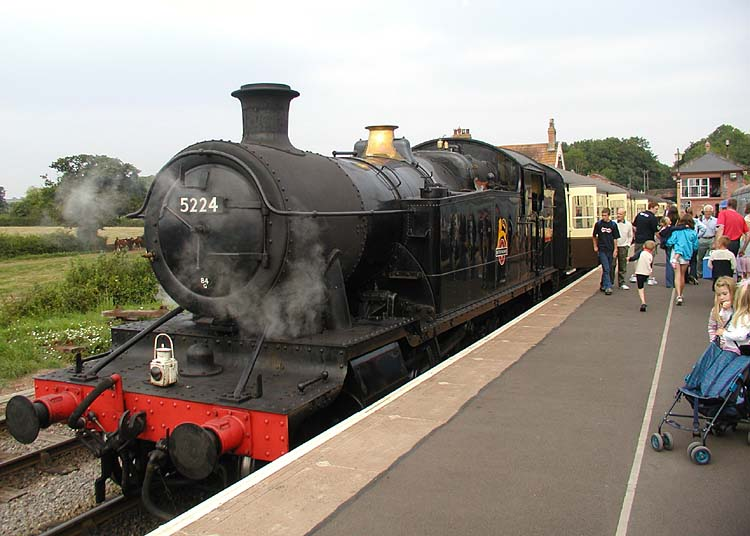
Bishops Lydeard station on the West Somerset Railway

Much of the county is scenic and unspoilt. Tourism is a major industry, estimated in 2001 to support around 23,000 people. Attractions include the coastal towns, from the west to the north east, Minehead, Watchet, Burnham-on-Sea, Weston-super-Mare, Clevedon and Portishead, with their various piers and beaches. Inland the county includes part of the Exmoor National Park, the West Somerset Railway (a heritage railway), and the museum of the Fleet Air Arm at RNAS Yeovilton. The town of Glastonbury has mythical associations, and the annual open-air Glastonbury Festival (actually in Pilton), while the Cheddar Gorge has show caves open to visitors, as well as its locally produced cheese, although there is now only one cheese maker remaining in the village of Cheddar.

== Regional gross value ==
Regional gross value added by the non-metropolitan county of Somerset at current basic prices. Figures are in millions of British pounds sterling.
Year	Regional Gross Value Added^{[A]}	Agriculture^{[B]}	Industry^{[C]}	Services^{[D]}
1995	4,601	298	1,608	2,695
2000	5,872	199	1,936	3,737
2003	6,586	215	1,956	4,416

Notes

^{[A]}Components may not sum to totals due to rounding
^{[B]}Includes hunting and forestry
^{[C]}Includes energy and construction
^{[D]}Includes financial intermediation services indirectly measured
