= Peter Tom =

Peter Tom may refer to:

- Peter Tom (businessman) (born 1940), British businessman;chairman of Leicester Tigers
- Peter Tom (judge), American judge
- Peter Tom (politician) (1964–2018), Solomon Islands politician
