= Mendip Rail =

English freight operating railway company

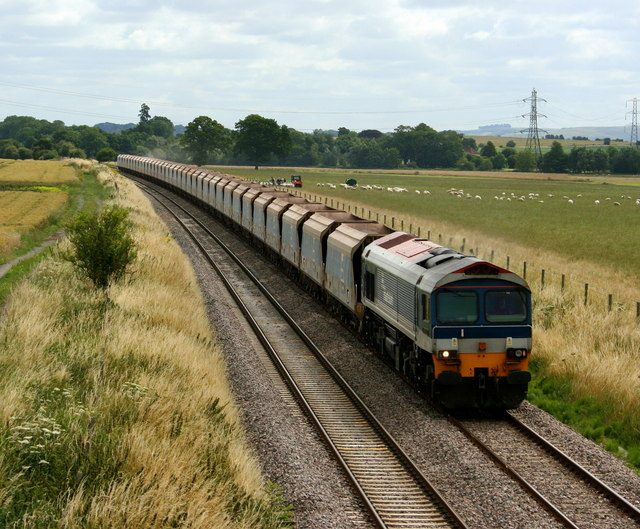
A Mendip Rail aggregate train

Mendip Rail Ltd is an independent freight operating railway company in Great Britain. It is a joint venture composed of the rail-operation divisions of Aggregate Industries (formerly Foster Yeoman) and Hanson Aggregates (previously ARC).

The company operates aggregate trains from the quarries of the Mendip Hills in South-West England, to London and South-East England. The Foster Yeoman quarries are at Torr Works and Dulcote Quarry, while Hanson has plants at Batts Combe Quarry and Whatley Quarry.

The company operates four Class 59/0 diesel locomotives owned by Aggregate Industries and four Class 59/1 locomotives owned by Hanson. In addition, two SW1001 Switchers are owned and operated at Whatley and Merehead quarries. It owns Merehead Traction Maintenance Depot (Merehead TMD) where the eight locomotives are allocated. They can also be seen at Hither Green TMD or Eastleigh Works where they receive heavy maintenance.

== Foster Yeoman ==
Foster Yeoman purchased its own fleet of 140 12-ton wagons in 1923, to take advantage of the fact that the Great Western Railway line ran adjacent to Dulcote Quarry. When the Torr Works opened in the 1960s, a rail terminal – named Merehead after the old quarry – was constructed to support the new quarry and was opened in August 1970, served by a spur from the East Somerset branch line which joins the main line at Witham. Further expansion was soon needed, with a chord being added between the terminal and the branch line in 1973.

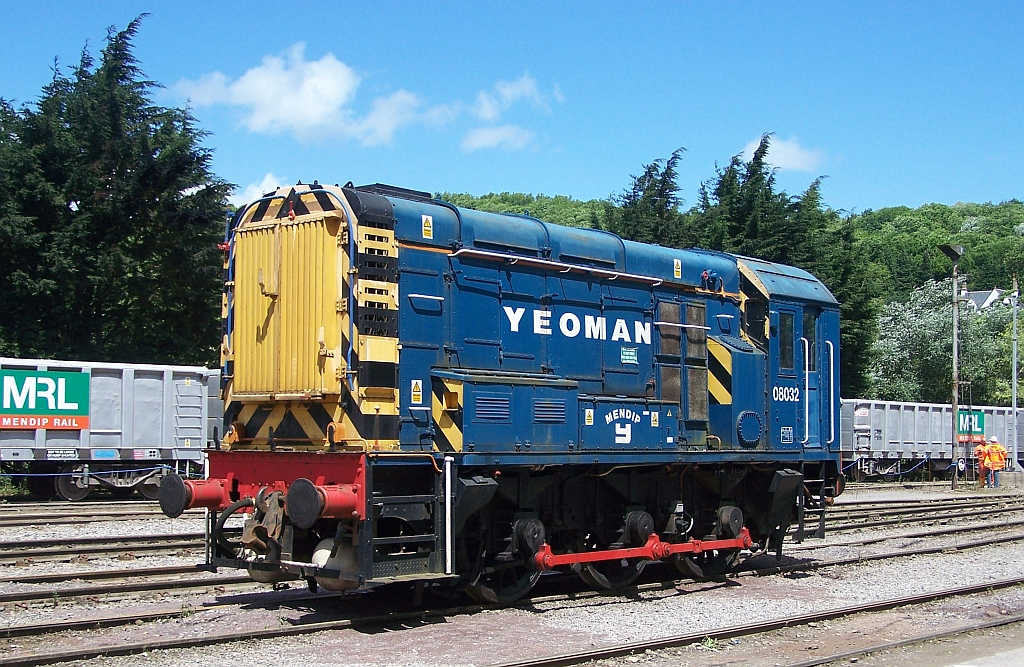
Yeoman Class 08 shunter at the Torr Works Quarry

British Rail shunting and mainline locomotives were used initially, but in 1972 Foster Yeoman bought the first of several Class 08 shunting engines. The company also has a General Motors EMD SW1001 switching locomotive which was purchased in 1980.

As a result of poor reliability of the various locomotives used by British Rail to haul stone trains from the West Country (with availability of the Class 56 locomotives from May 1984 as low as 30%, and only 60% of trains running on time), Foster Yeoman began negotiations with British Rail to improve service. Having already supplied its own wagons (with a reliability level of 96%) Foster Yeoman suggested to British Rail that it could operate its own locomotives, which would be the first privately owned engines to run on British rail tracks. British Rail's problem was the hard tie-in and control of the rail unions, but nevertheless BR accepted the principle.

Foster Yeoman issued a tender document which requested 95% reliability. General Motors' bid was ultimately successful, in particular because their proposed design, derived from the EMD SD40-2, was equipped with the well-proven 'Super Series' creep control, which allows superior traction at very low speeds. This, it was found, would enable a single locomotive to haul Foster Yeoman's 4,300 tonne stone trains, whilst two Class 56 or Class 58 engines would be needed to move the same load. This enabled Foster Yeoman to reduce its requirement from the original six locomotives to four.

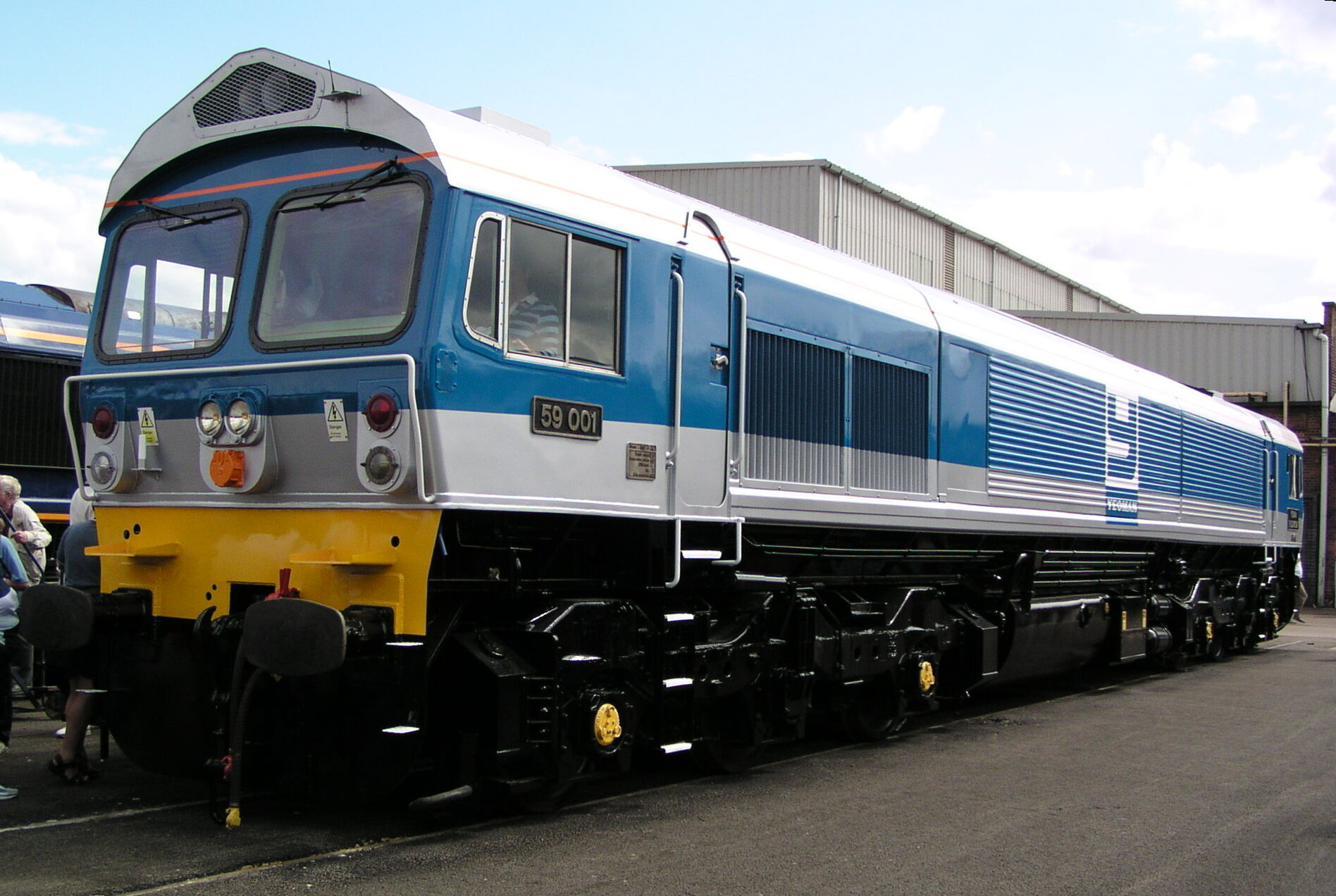
59001 Yeoman Endeavour at Doncaster Works in revised Foster Yeoman livery on 27 July 2003.

The contract with General Motors was signed in November 1984 and the new locomotives, built at the GM plant in La Grange, Illinois, were shipped across the Atlantic in January 1986. The JT26CW-SS, newly designated as British Rail Class 59/0, had a cab layout taken from the Class 58, to make driver assimilation easier, and to meet the British loading gauge a considerable amount of redesign work and various compromises were required from the original GM prototype. Once in the United Kingdom, further tests were undertaken before Foster Yeoman's new locomotives entered service in February 1986. They were officially named in a ceremony at Merehead on 28 June 1986.

The Class 59s delivered 99% reliability, leading Foster Yeoman to order a fifth engine in 1988. In their first ten years of operation the five locomotives between them hauled over 50 million tonnes of aggregates away from Merehead.

The four former-Yeoman locomotives still operated by Mendip Rail are:

- 59001 Yeoman Endeavour
- 59002 Alan J Day (formerly Yeoman Enterprise)
- 59004 Paul A Hammond (formerly Yeoman Challenger)
- 59005 Kenneth J Painter

59003 Yeoman Highlander was exported to Germany in 1997, renumbered as 259 003, and operated by Yeoman/Deutsche Bahn (DB), pulling stone trains. It has since been sold on to Heavy Haul Power International where it is still working on coal trains and pulls the highest train weight of any locomotive presently in Germany. On 19 August 2014, GB Railfreight (GBRF) confirmed it had purchased 59003 and planned to return it to the UK to haul GBRF freight trains by the end of 2014.

On 26 May 1991 Kenneth J Painter (59005) (with assistance from Yeoman Endeavour) set the European haulage record, with a stone train weighing 11,982 tonnes and 5,415 feet (1,650 m) long. However, the so-called 'mega train' experiment was not fully successful, as a coupling in the centre of the train broke.

== Hanson ARC ==
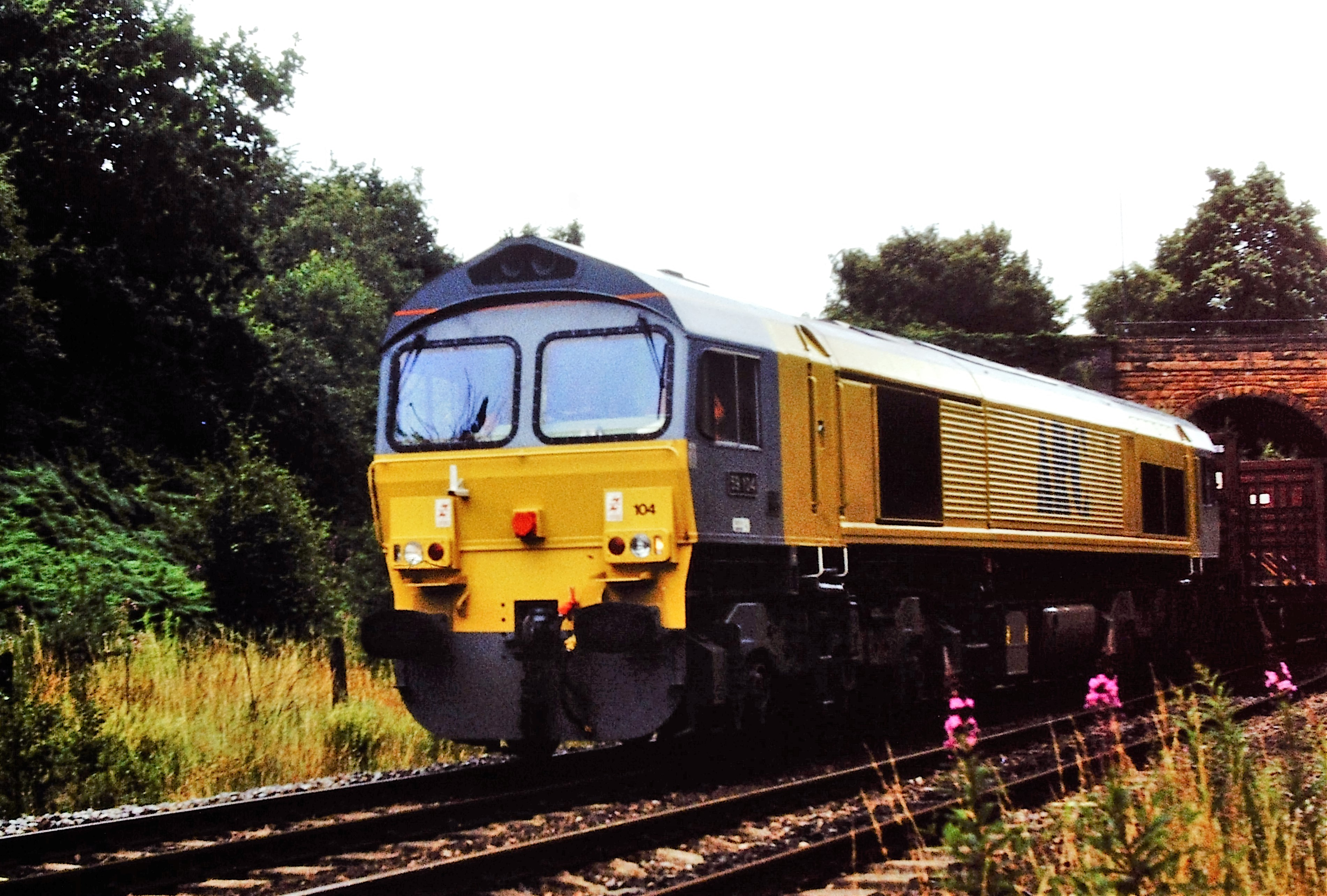
ARC 59104 Village of Great Elm in original livery

The four Class 59/1 locomotives owned by Hanson Aggregates (parent company of the former owner ARC) are similar to the Class 59/0 locomotives of Foster Yeoman and were built by General Motors Diesel Division at its London, Ontario plant in 1990. The main differences are a revised layout for the headlights and marker lights, and modifications to the suspension to permit the maximum speed to be increased to 75 mph (121 km/h) (if required in the future) with the fitting of yaw dampers.

== Shunting locomotives ==
Both Foster Yeoman and ARC operated shunting locomotives at their quarries which are managed by Mendip Rail. Forster Yeoman originally used second hand British Rail Class 08s but later bought an EMD SW1001, a precursor to their buying the fleet of Class 59s. ARC operated modern Thomas Hill Vanguard and Steelman shunters. After Mendip Rail was established, some locomotives have been moved between the two quarries and also the Foster Yeoman terminal at Isle of Grain.

Mendip Rail shunting locomotives
Number	Name	Type	Built	In service	Notes
11	Dulcote	Class 08	1952	1972-1982	BR D3002, now preserved on the Plym Valley Railway
22	Merehead	Class 08	1952	1973-1982	BR D3003, later displayed at Wanstrow but cut up in 1991
33	Mendip	Class 08	1953	1975-2008	BR 08032, now preserved on the Watercress Line
44	Western Yeoman II	SW1001	1980	1980-	
55		Class 08	1959	1989-	BR 08650
66		Class 08	1959	1993-	BR 08652
77	Pride of Whatley	Steelman	1987	?-	
88		Vanguard	?	?-	
120		SW1001	?	?-	

== Merger and operations ==
To better manage their fleet availability and scale needs, Hanson ARC and Foster Yeoman founded Mendip Rail in 1993. The assets are still owned by the parent companies and the staff are seconded to Mendip Rail.

Mendip Rail's class 59s work services between various destinations which have changed over time according to demand and specific contracts. They have worked regularly over southern railway tracks, for example to the former Foster Yeoman terminals at Eastleigh and Botley, as well as delivering aggregates for construction work on the Thames Barrier, Second Severn Crossing, Channel Tunnel and most recently Heathrow Terminal 5, which required 3 million tonnes of stone.

In 2010 it was reported that Mendip Rail was hauling about 4.5 million tonnes of stone from Torr Works each year, and about 2.5 million tonnes from Whatley Quarry.

== Accidents and incidents ==
=== 12 September 2000 ===
While working the 6A20 Whatley Quarry to Acton (West London) stone train, 59103 Village of Mells and the first ten hopper wagons derailed at 23:20 on 12 September 2000 between Great Elm Tunnel and Bedlam Tunnel on the single track branch line to the Hanson Quarry at Whatley. The locomotive and the first two hoppers rolled, and 59103 came to rest on the parapet of a small bridge on the driver's side (left by direction of travel) with the trailing bogie partially torn off by the following hopper car. The locomotive was pulled upright on 19 September 2000 and removed to Whatley Quarry where an initial assessment of the damage was made and repairs made to make the locomotive safe for removal by road.

=== 6 October 2008 ===
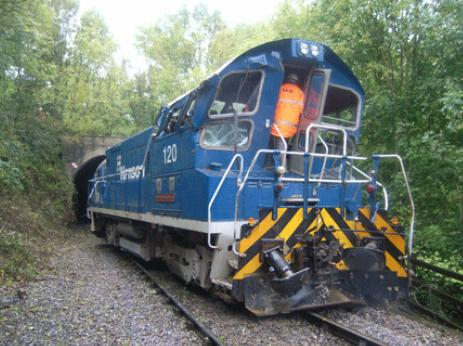
The derailed and damaged shunter following the accident on 6 October 2008

Shortly before 17:30< on 6 October 2008 a mainline engine, which had earlier departed the Whatley Quarry depot, was hit from behind by a runaway train on the quarry branch line at Bedlam, near Great Elm.

The runaway train consisted of a shunter hauling sixteen loaded stone wagons, weighing a total of 1,700 tonnes. It had been engaged in marshalling duties with another train at the quarry sidings when the train's main air brake handle suffered a mechanical failure. The crew had attempted to stop the train by applying the shunter's direct air brake, but this was negated by the momentum of the moving wagons. The shunter's Driver's Safety Device (deadman's pedal) was disabled by a feature that let the driver leave his seat to monitor the train's passage as long as the direct air brake was applied. Had that brake been released and the deadman's pedal been functional, the train's main air brakes would have applied automatically and stopped the train. Trap points which might have derailed the train before it joined the branch line had not been reset after the mainline train departed.

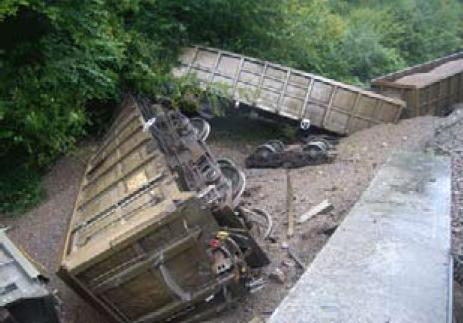
Derailed stone wagons after the accident on 6 October 2008

While it had been travelling less than 6.5 km/h (4 mph) at the time of the brake failure, the runaway accelerated down a gradient to a speed of 41 km/h (25.5 mph) by the time it collided with the mainline locomotive (which was going 16 km/h (10 mph) in the same direction), over 1.5 kilometres (1 mi) down the line. The shunter's crew had abandoned the locomotive before impact and there were no serious injuries as a result.

The shunter, which by the time of impact was already damaged after passing a tunnel too low for it, was derailed, as were the first five stone wagons; four of those completely left the branch line and travelled down a steep embankment. The shunter suffered significant but repairable damage, and there was only minor damage to the mainline locomotive. A section of track was completely destroyed.

The Rail Accident Investigation Branch (RAIB) reviewed the accident and decided that it did not warrant undertaking a full investigation. The RAIB did recommend that an additional "brake of last resort" be fitted to the shunter and to similar industrial locomotives. The RAIB also noted the need to consider the use of self-restoring trap points for the quarry sidings.

=== 10 November 2008 ===
At approximately 02:40 the two locomotives hauling the 7A91 Merehead Quarry to Acton Terminal Complex train derailed at East Somerset Junction between Westbury and Castle Cary.

=== 20 March 2017 ===
At 17:50, 7Z15, the 1705 Merehead Quarry to Acton Terminal Complex train, derailed at East Somerset Junction between Westbury and Castle Cary. Rail Accident Investigation Branch (RAIB) inspectors deployed within the hour.
