= Torr Works =

Limestone quarry in Somerset, England

Coordinates: 51.19979°N 2.43791°W

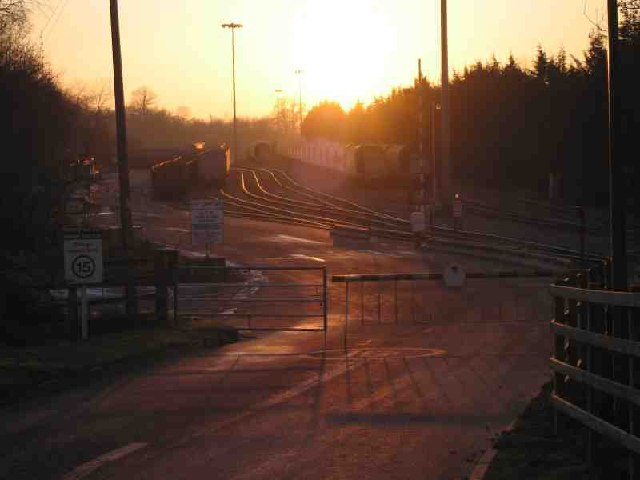
The railhead at Torr Works

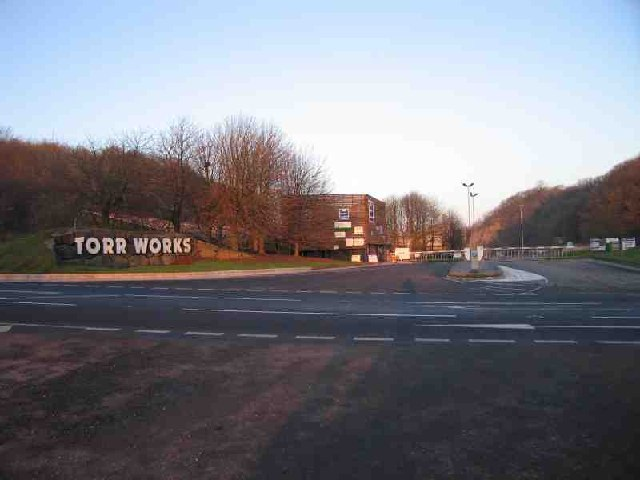
The entrance to Torr Works Quarry

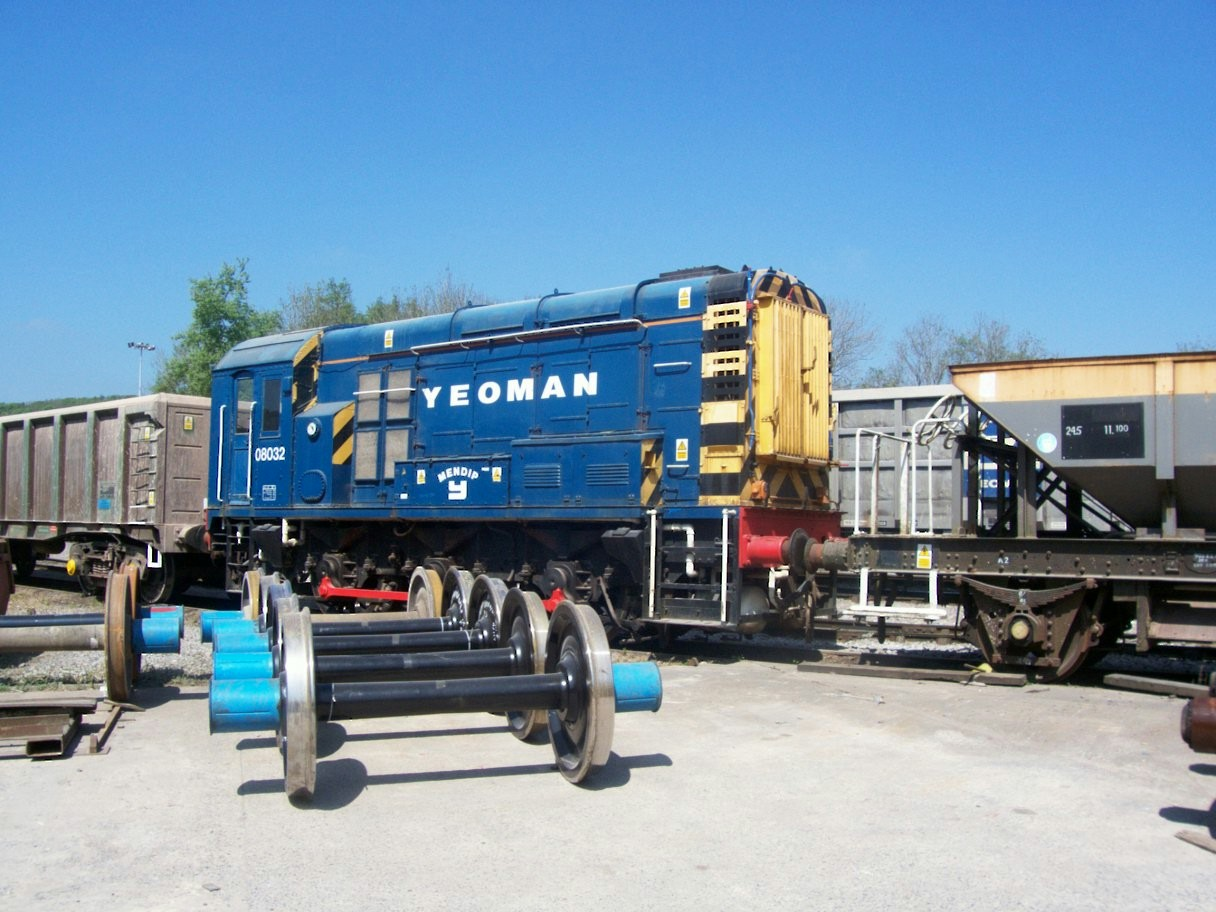
Class 08 shunter 08032 in the yard at Torr Works

Torr Works quarry, grid reference ST695446 is a limestone quarry at East Cranmore, near Shepton Mallet on the Mendip Hills, Somerset, England. The quarry was formerly known as Merehead, a name which has been retained for its rail depot on the opposite side of the A361 road.

== Geology ==
The site, located not far from a limestone deposit, covers an area of some 205 hectares, including 60 hectares which have been landscaped to blend with the surrounding countryside. A geodiversity audit of the site in 2004 recorded pale to dark grey well bedded Carboniferous Limestone dipping consistently southwards with a small area of overlying horizontally bedded buff-coloured Jurassic oolitic limestone forming an angular unconformity.

== History ==
In 1938 the recently opened Merehead Quarry was taken over by Limmer and Trinidad. Twenty-five men were employed at the time. In 1958 the quarry was sold to Foster Yeoman who had been working Dulcote Quarry near Wells. The quarry was renamed Torr Works (after Ron Torr, the Chief Engineer) on 19 August 1970.

It has been operated by Aggregate Industries since their take over of Foster Yeoman in 2006. The site employs over 250 people and produces 7.5 million tonnes of limestone annually which is carried directly from the quarry by Mendip Rail.

== Merehead rail terminal ==
The quarry was connected to the East Somerset Branch in 1970 and the first train operated from the quarry on 19 August 1970.

== See also ==
- Quarries of the Mendip Hills
