= Dulcote Quarry =

Disused limestone quarry in Somerset, England

Coordinates: 51.19805°N 2.62395°W

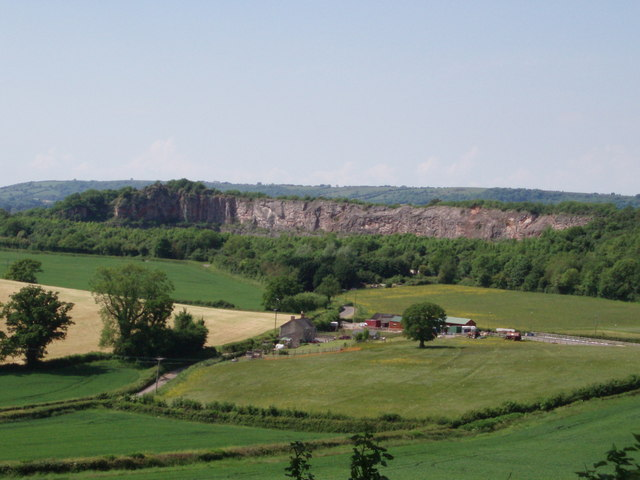
Dulcote Quarry in 2006

Dulcote Quarry is a disused limestone quarry at Dulcote, near Wells on the Mendip Hills, Somerset, England. The quarry measures around 600 metres (2,000 ft) from West to East and around 350 metres (1,150 ft) from North to South, with an area of 18 acres (7.3 ha), which is surrounded by 80 acres (32 ha) of woodland.

The site has been used for quarrying since the mid-19th century. The Foster Yeoman Company was founded at Dulcote, in 1923, and later became part of Aggregate Industries. The site achieved an output of approximately 0.25M tonnes per year of Carboniferous Limestone, for general purpose construction aggregates. Much of the stone was moved on the Cheddar Valley Line (a branch line of the Great Western Railway) by an independent company which became known as Mendip Rail.

A Geodiversity audit of the site was carried out in 2004, which highlighted the limestone strata and fossils identified. These include Carboniferous Limestone overlain by Triassic Mercia Mudstones and Sandstones with geodes, which were formed by siliceous mineral replacement.

In 2007 the quarry was bought by the Kilbride group, a subsidiary of Kilmartin Holdings which itself became part of Hansteen Holdings. When the parent company went into receivership the part owning Dulcote survived and put the worked-out quarry site up for commercial redevelopment with outline planning permission for a price of £1.5 million. In 2016 the site was bought for development as a food production site for Charlie Bigham's, which opened in 2017. In March 2022, a multi-user path (part of the Strawberry Line) connecting the end of the Wells-Dulcote railway path at Dulcote underpass to the quarry entrance was officially opened.

== See also ==
- Quarries of the Mendip Hills
