= Whatley Quarry =

Limestone quarry in Somerset, England

Coordinates: 51.22965°N 2.38663°W

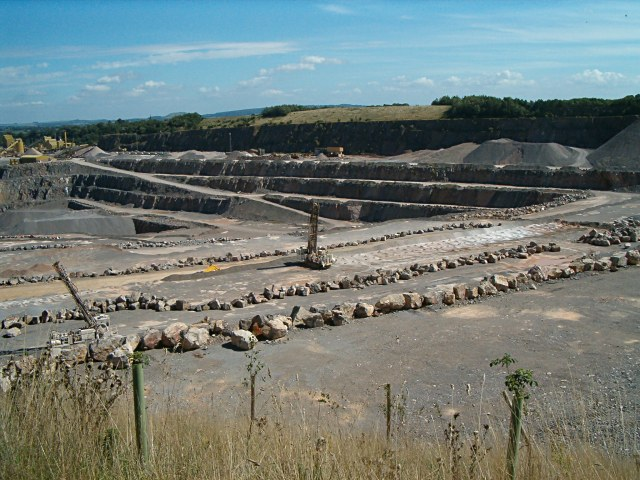
Western extension of Whatley Quarry.

Whatley Quarry, grid reference ST731479 is a limestone quarry owned by Heidelberg Materials (formerly known as Hanson UK), near the village of Whatley on the Mendip Hills, Somerset, England.

The quarry exhibits pale to dark grey carboniferous limestone with a small area of overlying horizontally bedded buff-coloured Jurassic oolitic limestone forming an angular unconformity, with extensive dolomitisation of top of the Black Rock Limestone. There are abundant near-vertical fissures and joints near top of limestone with karst weathering and minor pinnacle formation.

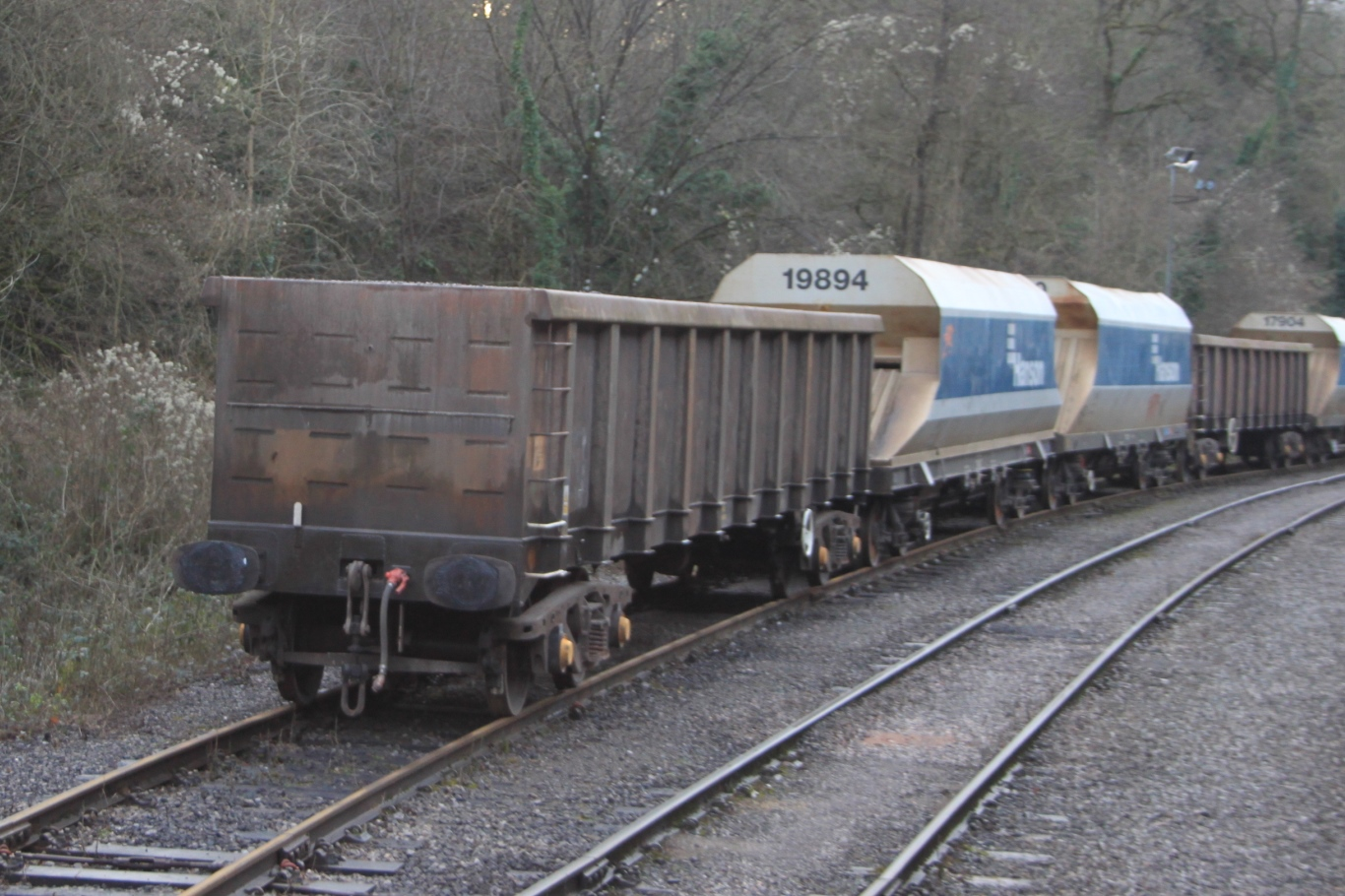
A selection of open and hopper wagons awaiting repairs at Whatley Quarry

The quarry is linked by a freight-only railway line, part of the former Bristol and North Somerset Railway using trains operated by Mendip Rail, to a junction with the Reading to Taunton Line near Frome station.

The quarry has been the object of protests against its impact on the environment and has had to appeal against planning application decisions because of the claimed derogation of river flows, groundwater abstractions and local springs due to historical dewatering associated with the quarry.

There is a study centre for school children close to the quarry.

== See also ==
- Quarries of the Mendip Hills
