= Foster Yeoman =

Quarrying and asphalt company

- Industry: Construction
- Founded: 10 October 1923
- Defunct: 2006
- Fate: Merged into Aggregate Industries
- Headquarters: Marston Bigot, United Kingdom
- Products: Aggregate; Asphalt
- Website: www.foster-yeoman.co.uk

Foster Yeoman Limited, based near Frome, Somerset, England, was one of Europe's largest independent quarrying and asphalt companies. It was sold to Aggregate Industries in 2006.

== History ==
The company was founded by Foster Yeoman, from Hartlepool, at Dulcote, near Wells, in 1923. He was a former ship owner and had worked in the iron and steel business.

After the Second World War, with Foster Yeoman ailing, business declined and the company came full circle, returning to a £20,000 turnover it had enjoyed in 1923. During 1949, Foster died and his son, John Foster Yeoman, became a managing director at the age of 21. Educated at Monkton Combe School, Millfield and the University of Bristol, he set about turning the company around, despite his youth and inexperience. John employed Ron Torr to redevelop the plant and, within four years, the company had returned to profit.

Dulcote was not the best location and, with an eye to rising costs, competition and the need for future expansion, John Yeoman bought the under-exploited Merehead Quarry at East Cranmore in Somerset in 1958. Significant development of the site was undertaken; at John Yeoman's behest, the branch line between Merehead and Westbury was re-opened to permit trains to serve the quarry. The use of rail transport to deliver materials proved to be effective, permitting annual production to be raised as high as five million tonnes during the early 1970s. By the 1980s, around eight million tonnes of material was being extracted each year from Merehead alone.

The stone had been carried to its destination by lorry since 1949, but now Foster Yeoman reverted to rail transport. The Merehead Stone Terminal was established in 1970 to handle the transfer of aggregate onto high capacity freight trains. This development was followed by the building of the railhead depot and coating plant at Botley, Hampshire, in 1973. On its 75th anniversary, the company published a colorful pictorial history of the company with a focus on its use of railway transport to move the aggregate.

The 1980s proved to be a time of substantial change and growth for the company; between 1982 and 1989, sales more than doubled to reach £87.1 million while the business' net assets trebled in valued to £28.3 million. During 1984, Foster Yeoman bought the derelict Marston House, a Grade II* listed building near Frome.

When John Foster Yeoman suddenly died in 1987 he was succeeded by his widow, Angela Yeoman, who decided against selling the company despite numerous parties indicating their interest in purchasing Foster Yeoman.

Foster Yeoman was responsible for the supply of aggregate in the construction of multiple landmark civil engineering schemes, including the Thames Barrier, M25 motorway and the Channel Tunnel. The company was a major supplier of coated stone products used for projects as diverse as motorways, airports and tennis courts.

Having built up its substantial interests in Northern Europe, Foster Yeoman ran a locomotive on German railways from 1997 to 1999. Its other interests include civil engineering and recycling. During 1997, it acquired RJ Maxwell, an operator of a London-based asphalt works and wharves. Continuation of waterborne transport of aggregates on the Thames Tideway was also ensured by the acquisition of Bennetts Barges, which also carried major components of the London Eye and a decommissioned Concorde aircraft.

In the early 21st century, the company's direction became muddled by protracted family disagreements. During 2006, Foster Yeoman was wholly acquired by the Holcim Group and was subsequently integrated into its Aggregate Industries subsidiary.

== Quarries ==
=== Torr Works (Merehead) ===
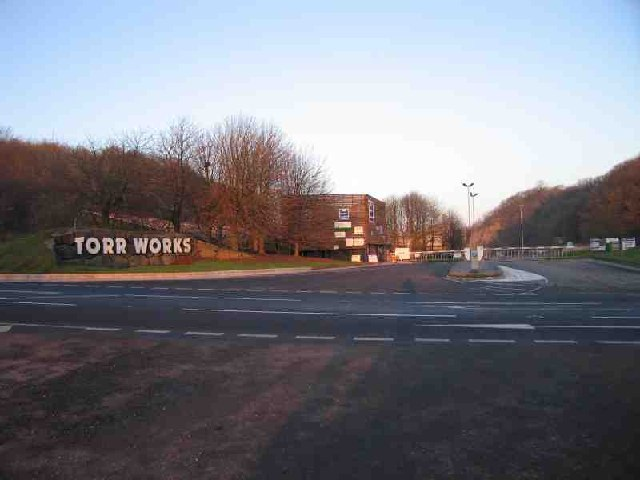
The entrance to Torr Works Quarry

John Yeoman bought the under-exploited Merehead Quarry in 1958. The site, located not far from a limestone deposit, covers an area of some 205 hectares, including 60 hectares which have been landscaped to blend with the surrounding countryside. Torr Works' output was six million tonnes per year by 1992.

=== Glensanda ===
John Yeoman had long been captivated by the idea of the super-quarry to be situated in a remote location from which stone could be exported by sea, which had also been declared as preferred government policy. To this end, and always looking ahead, he bought the Glensanda estate near Oban in Argyll in 1982, which was projected to be capable of producing up to 15 million tonnes of granite per year. A pilot plant was installed (extended in 1996) which extracts granite by the "glory hole" and conveyor belt method, a pioneering development in alternative quarrying technology.

Glensanda went into operation in 1986 when the first shipload of granite left for Houston, Texas, US. During the early 1990s, the production director at Glensanda was Kurt Larson, John and Angela Yeoman's son-in-law. By 1992, production at Glensanda had reached five million tonnes per year; however, there was still plenty of untapped capacity, the site having an estimated one billion tonnes of material available.

During the early 1990s, Foster Yeoman took delivery of three large self-discharging ships with a combined annual carrying capacity of 8 million tonnes for exporting material from Glensanda in bulk to destinations as far away as North America. By 2011, Glensanda had developed into Europe’s largest quarry, routinely supplying the largest gravity-fed self-discharging ships in the world.

== Rail operations ==
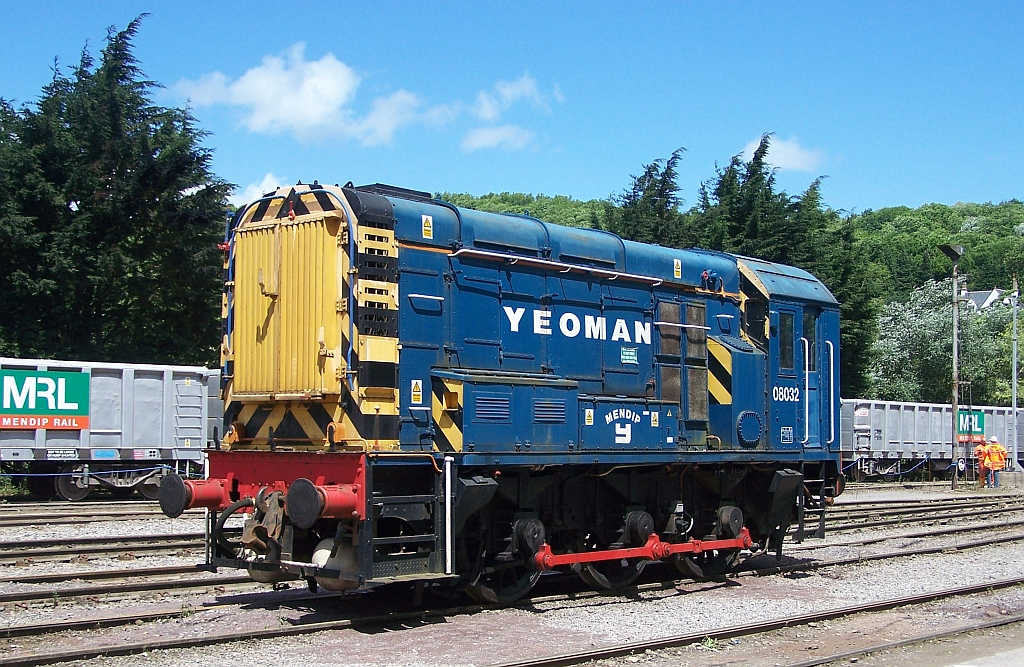
Class 08 shunter at the Torr Works Quarry

Foster Yeoman transported the majority of its stone product from Merehead to various distribution points across the UK by train. The company purchased its own fleet of 140 12-ton wagons in 1923 to take advantage of the fact that the Great Western Railway line ran adjacent to Dulcote Quarry. When the Torr Works opened in the 1960s, a rail terminal – named Merehead after the old quarry – was constructed to support the new quarry and was opened in August 1970, served by a spur from the East Somerset branch line which joins the main line at Witham. Further expansion was soon needed, with a chord being added between the terminal and the branch line in 1973.

Throughout much of the British Rail era, both shunting and mainline locomotives were provided by the national railway operator. However, in 1972, Foster Yeoman bought the first of several Class 08 shunting locomotive; the company also purchased a General Motors EMD SW1001 switching locomotive in 1980. Foster Yeoman was dissatisfied with the poor reliability achieved by the various locomotives used by British Rail to haul stone trains from the West Country (with availability of the Class 56 locomotives from May 1984 as low as 30%, and only 60% of trains running on time), leading to the firm negotiating with British Rail to improve service. Having already supplied its own wagons (with a reliability level of 96%) Foster Yeoman suggested to British Rail that it could operate its own locomotives, which would be the first privately owned engines to run on British rail tracks. British Rail's problem was the hard tie-in and control of the rail unions, but nevertheless it accepted the principle.

What may in retrospect be viewed as the harbinger of private rail operation in Britain occurred in 1985 when Foster Yeoman opted to purchase a number of powerful freight locomotives from the American conglomerate General Motors' Electro-Motive Diesel division (GM-EMD), designated Class 59. These were procured to be exclusively used on its mineral trains. Although owned and maintained by Foster Yeoman, the Class 59s were manned by British Rail staff. During acceptance trials, on 16 February 1986, locomotive 59001 hauled a train weighing 4639 tonnes – the heaviest load ever hauled by a single non-articulated traction unit. Foster Yeoman's Class 59s proved to be extremely reliable, promptly encouraging other firms, such as the rival quarry company ARC and privatised power generator National Power to also purchase their own fleets of Class 59s to haul their own trains.

Foster Yeoman and ARC agreed in 1993 to create Mendip Rail. This was a joint venture company which combined their locomotives and rolling stock in one streamlined operation and was the third largest freight company in the UK. It was particularly active in the southern region, where the former Foster Yeoman terminals at Eastleigh and Botley are present, as well as delivering aggregates for construction work on various major projects, including the Thames Barrier, Second Severn Crossing, Channel Tunnel, and Heathrow Terminal 5.
