= Peter Tom (businessman) =

British businessman

Peter William Gregory Tom, CBE (born 1940, Cornwall) is a British businessman. He is Chairman of Leicester Tigers.

He made 130 appearances for Leicester Tigers as a lock forward between 1963 and 1968, and went on to be chief executive of Aggregate Industries, when it was formed through a merger in 1997. He was awarded the CBE in 2006 for services to business and sport in Leicestershire. After stepping down as chairman of Aggregate Industries in 2007, he went on to become Executive Chairman of Breedon Group in 2010.
