= Holcim UK =

British building materials manufacturer

Holcim UK Limited
- Formerly: Aggregate Industries UK Limited
- Company type: Subsidiary
- Industry: Quarrying, construction, building materials
- Founded: 1858; 168 years ago
- Headquarters: Bardon Hill, Coalville, Leicestershire, UK
- Key people: Lee Sleight (CEO)
- Products: Aggregates; Road surfacing and contracting services Garden and driveway landscaping Masonry; Ready mixed concrete and screed Roofing tiles Staircases and flooring Surface water solutions Sustainable drainage systems Walling products Asphalt; Cement/cementitious materials Commercial hard landscaping Concrete blocks
- Parent: Holcim Group
- Website: holcim.co.uk

Holcim UK Limited (formerly Aggregate Industries UK Limited), a member of the Holcim Group, is a company based in the United Kingdom with headquarters at Bardon Hill, Coalville, Leicestershire. Holcim UK manufactures and supplies a range of heavy building materials, primarily aggregates such as stone, asphalt and concrete to the construction industry and other business sectors. Holcim UK also manufactures and imports cement, and provides a range of aggregate-associated goods and services, these include the manufacture of masonry and reconstructed stone items for construction industry and domestic applications, the manufacture of pre-cast concrete items, the supply of ready-mixed concrete, design and project management consulting, and resurfacing contracting services.

Holcim UK operates over 200 sites and employs approximately 4,000 people across the UK.

== History ==
The origins of Aggregate Industries can be traced back to the Ellis family of Beaumont Leys (present day Leicester). Active Quakers, the family was influential in the Midlands' first public railway, the Leicester and Swannington Railway, which was used to transport granite from local quarries. In time, John Ellis became the local MP and his descendant, Joseph Ellis II, entered into partnership with a Breedon Everard of Groby, initially as coal merchants, later extending their business interests to granite.

In 1858, following the death of Joseph Ellis II, his sons James and Joseph joined with Breedon Everard to lease the Bardon quarries belonging to Robert Jacomb-Hood II of Bardon Hall. Those quarries, now known as Bardon Hills, remained active as the business expanded, and the nearby Bardon Hall became the company's headquarters. Peter Tom joined the business in 1956 and, as Bardon Group, he steered it towards an initial public offering on the London Stock Exchange in 1988.

Following the merger of Bardon Group and Camas (the former aggregates business of English China Clays) in 1997, Peter Tom became chief executive of the merged business, named Aggregate Industries, which continued to grow rapidly by acquisition under his management.

In late 1999, David Tidmarsh, managing director of Aggregate Industries, publicly appealed for the British government to do more to support the field of recycled aggregates.

Massachusetts State Police searched the offices of Aggregate Industries, the largest concrete supplier for the underground portions of the Big Dig, in June 2005. They seized evidence that Aggregate delivered concrete that did not meet contract specifications. In March 2006 Massachusetts Attorney General Tom Reilly announced plans to sue project contractors and others because of poor work on the project. Over 200 complaints were filed by the state of Massachusetts as a result of leaks, cost overruns, quality concerns, and safety violations. In total, the state has sought approximately $100 million from the contractors ($1 for every $141 spent). In May 2006, six employees of the company were arrested and charged with conspiracy to defraud the United States. In July 2007, Aggregate Industries settled the case with an agreement to pay $50 million. $42 million of the settlement went to civil cases and $8 million was paid in criminal fines. The company will provide $75 million in insurance for maintenance as well as pay $500,000 toward routine checks on areas suspected to contain substandard concrete.

In 2005, after receiving regulatory approval, the company was acquired by the Swiss-based Holcim Group in exchange for $3.37 billion. One year later, Aggregate Industries announced its expansion plans, which were centred around the UK. That same year, Foster Yeoman was acquired by Holcim Group and subsequently integrated into Aggregate Industries. By 2010, the company employed more than 5,000 staff.

In November 2014, Aggregate Industries announced that work to upgrade its Glensanda quarry, which was the largest granite quarry in Europe at the time, had been completed. This upgrade, which reportedly cost £30 million, comprised the delivery of a new primary crushing machine along with a new tunnel, which enabled aggregates to be transported from the site directly onto cargo ships.

In July 2015, as a consequence of the merger between Lafarge and Holcim Group, Aggregate Industries became the owner of cement works in Staffordshire and Northern Ireland.

In the early 2020s, in response to pressure from the British government for businesses to reduce their carbon footprints, Aggregate Industries began to increase its use of low-carbon processes, which included the electrification of its vehicles and the exploration of alternative fuel sources, such as biofuels. Furthermore, Aggregate Industries has produced a range of sustainability-focused products, including its low carbon, low water 'Life' range.

In 2022, the company acquired the railway recycling specialist Land Recovery, as well as the regional supplier Wiltshire Heavy Building Materials Ltd. In the following year, it also purchased the precast material supplier Besblock Ltd. In 2024, Aggregate Industries expanded its capacity to work on London-based projects via upgrading Tilbury Docks to facilitate faster cement shipments; separately, it also started using a new 080,000-tonne capacity wharf site in Great Yarmouth.

In March 2025, Aggregate Industries rebranded as Holcim UK, aligning more closely with its Swiss parent company Holcim Group. The rebrand, effective 14 March and announced on 17 March 2025, consolidated 25 brands under the Holcim UK. Later that same year, the company expanded its presence in the aggregate and concrete markets via the acquisitions of PJ Thory, including subsidiaries Gemmix and Pro Minimix. Holcim UK also abandoned its plans to establish a new quarry on farmland outside of Ottery St Mary in Devon.
