= List of Sites of Special Scientific Interest in Somerset =

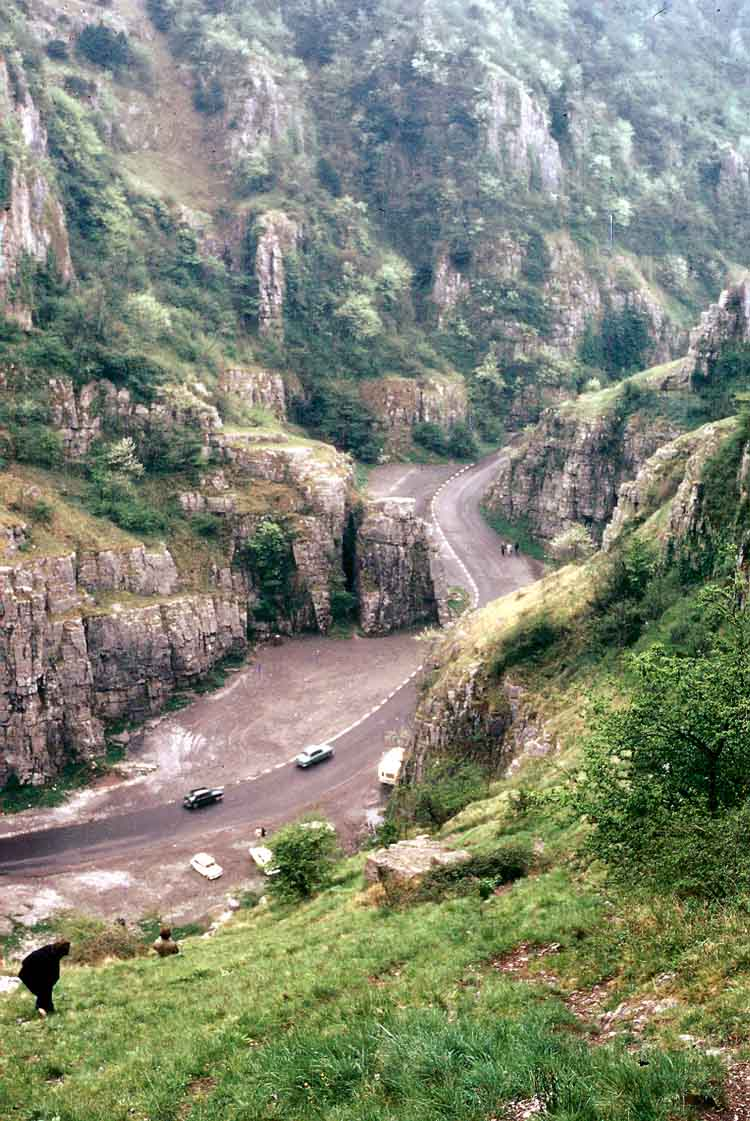
A view of the Cheddar Gorge, designated as an SSSI for both its biological and its geological interest.

This is a list of the Sites of Special Scientific Interest (SSSIs) in Somerset, England, United Kingdom. In England the body responsible for designating SSSIs is Natural England, which chooses a site because of its fauna, flora, geological or physiographical features. There are 127 sites designated in this Area of Search, of which 83 have been designated due to their biological interest, 35 due to their geological interest, and 9 for both.

Natural England took over the role of designating and managing SSSIs from English Nature in October 2006 when it was formed from the amalgamation of English Nature, parts of the Countryside Agency and the Rural Development Service. Natural England, like its predecessor, uses the 1974–1996 county system, and as such the same approach is followed here, therefore some sites you may expect to find in this list could be in the Avon list. The data in the table is taken from English Nature in the form of citation sheets for each SSSI.

For other counties, see List of SSSIs by Area of Search.

== Sites ==
Site name	Reason for designation		Area^{[A]}		Grid reference^{[B]}	Year in which notified	Map^{[C]}
Site name	Biological interest	Geological interest	Hectares	Acres	Grid reference^{[B]}	Year in which notified	Map^{[C]}
Aller and Beer Woods	✓		56.9	140.6	ST404305	1952	Map
Aller Hill	✓		18.4	45.4	ST408291	1988	Map
Asham Wood	✓		141.6	347.5	ST705460	1963	Map
Axbridge Hill and Fry's Hill	✓		67.1	160.1	ST433555	1990	Map
Babcary Meadows	✓		13.6	31.6	ST567293	1988	Map
River Barle	✓		104.2	257.5	SS723423	1997	Map
Barle Valley	✓		622.9	1,539.2	SS850349	1954	Map
Barrington Hill Meadows	✓		16.1	39.5	ST300170	1987	Map
Ben Knowle		✓	1.5	3.6	ST513450	1984	Map
Berrow Dunes	✓		200.0	494.3	ST293520	1952	Map
Black Down and Sampford Commons	✓		155.2	383.5	ST118161	1952	Map
Blue Anchor to Lilstock Coast		✓	742.8	1,835.5	ST033435	1971	Map
Brean Down	✓	✓	65.1	169.7	ST290590	1952	Map
Bridgwater Bay	✓		3,574.1	8,831.6	ST290480	1989	Map
Briggins Moor	✓		15.3	37.8	SS893250	1994	Map
Brimble Pit and Cross Swallet Basins		✓	154.3	381.3	ST512505	1987	Map
Bruton Railway Cutting		✓	1.7	4.3	ST688348	1971	Map
Catcott Edington and Chilton Moors	✓		1,083.0	2,676.0	ST390420	1967	Map
Chancellor's Farm	✓		34.2	84.6	ST525525	1984	Map
Cheddar Complex	✓	✓	441.3	1,090.5	ST465538	1952	Map
Cheddar Reservoir	✓		105.4	260.6	ST441537	1972	Map
Cheddar Wood	✓		86.9	214.7	ST445552	1967	Map
Cleeve Hill	✓		15.1	37.4	ST056428	1989	Map
Cloford Quarry		✓	38.9	98.6	ST718444	1994	Map
Cogley Wood	✓		60.7	150.1	ST703345	1987	Map
Cook's Wood Quarry		✓	1.8	4.4	ST669479	1988	Map
Crook Peak to Shute Shelve Hill	✓	✓	332.2	820.9	ST385555	1952	Map
Curry and Hay Moors	✓		472.8	1,168.1	ST323273	1992	Map
Deadman	✓		28.8	71.2	ST234156	1987	Map
Doulting Railway Cutting		✓	2.8	6.9	ST645424	1971	Map
Draycott Sleights	✓		62.0	153.0	ST483518	1987	Map
Dunster Park and Heathlands	✓		466.6	1,153.0	SS955441	2000	Map
East Polden Grasslands	✓		124.0	306.4	ST474325	1999	Map
Ebbor Gorge	✓		41.0	156.8	ST525485	1952	Map
Edford Woods and Meadows	✓		54.3	134.1	ST665485	1957	Map
Emborough Quarries		✓	1.0	2.5	ST623505	1971	Map
Exmoor Coastal Heaths	✓		1,758.3	4,344.7	SS620480	1994	Map
Fivehead Arable Fields	✓		10.3	25.4	ST337224	1990	Map
Fivehead Woods and Meadow	✓		62.4	154.2	ST331231	1989	Map
Freshmoor	✓		11.2	27.7	ST280125	1989	Map
Friar's Oven	✓		4.0	9.9	ST592431	1989	Map
Ge-mare Farm Fields	✓		4.1	10.3	ST155424	1988	Map
Glenthorne		✓	13.3	32.8	SS794499	1989	Map
Godminster Lane Quarry and Railway Cutting		✓	0.8	1.9	ST682345	1971	Map
Great Breach and Copley Woods	✓		64.8	160.0	ST500320	1972	Map
Greylake		✓	9.3	22.9	ST384336	1987	Map
Grove Farm	✓		36.5	90.2	ST513096	1989	Map
Ham Hill		✓	11.1	27.6	ST482162	1971	Map
Hardington Moor	✓		8.7	21.6	ST515130	1994	Map
Hestercombe House ^{[D]}	✓		<0.1	0.2	ST242287	2000	Map
Hobbs Quarry		✓	0.5	0.1	ST622446	1984	Map
Holme Moor & Clean Moor	✓		10.8	26.7	ST095260	1987	Map
Holwell Quarries		✓	1.3	3.2	ST726450	1952	Map
Hurcott Farm		✓	26.3	65.0	ST511295	1993	Map
Hurcott Lane Cutting		✓	0.5	1.2	ST398163	1997	Map
King's Sedgemoor	✓		822.0	2,031.2	ST400330	1985	Map
Kingdown and Middledown	✓		5.7	14.1	ST480532	1991	Map
Kingweston Meadows	✓		11.5	28.4	ST540304	1990	Map
Lamb Leer		✓	14.6	36.0	ST544550	1983	Map
Lang's Farm	✓		7.5	18.5	ST170241	1990	Map
Langford Heathfield	✓		95.4	235.7	ST100235	1966	Map
Langmead and Weston Level	✓		168.8	417.1	ST353330	1991	Map
Langport Railway Cutting		✓	0.5	1.3	ST427272	1992	Map
Laycock Railway Cutting		✓	1.3	3.1	ST678213	1993	Map
Leighton Road Cutting		✓	0.6	1.4	ST702437	1984	Map
Long Dole Wood and Meadows^{[H]}	✓		9.8	24.3	ST610562	1997	Map
Long Lye	✓		11.7	29.0	ST265122	1988	Map
Long Lye Meadow	✓		3.3	8.2	ST267119	2002	Map
Longleat Woods	✓		249.9	617.4	ST795435	1972	Map
Low Ham		✓	5.0	12.5	ST440290	1988	Map
Maes Down		✓	0.2	0.4	ST647406	1985	Map
Maesbury Railway Cutting		✓	2.0	5.0	ST606475	1995	Map
Miller's Hill, Milborne Wick		✓	0.6	1.4	ST663205	1985	Map
Millwater	✓		1.4	3.5	ST439100	1989	Map
Moon's Hill Quarry		✓	3.4	8.5	ST665460	1996	Map
Moorlinch	✓		226.0	558.4	ST390360	1985	Map
Nettlecombe Park	✓		90.4	223.4	ST055375	1990	Map
North Brewham Meadows	✓		8.9	21.9	ST743379	1987	Map
North Curry Meadow	✓		1.3	3.1	ST330253	1989	Map
North Exmoor	✓		12,005.3	29,665.0	SS800430	1954	Map
North Moor	✓		676.3	1,671.1	ST325305	1986	Map
Old Ironstone Works, Mells	✓		0.3	0.6	ST738488	1987	Map
The Perch	✓		72.1	178.2	ST480532	1990	Map
Porlock Ridge and Saltmarsh	✓	✓	186.3	460.4	SS880479	1990	Map
Postlebury Wood	✓		87.0	215.0	ST740430	1987	Map
Priddy Caves		✓	67.1	167.0	ST540505	1965	Map
Priddy Pools	✓	✓	52.7	130.2	ST545510	1972	Map
Prior's Park & Adcombe Wood	✓		103.6	256.0	ST225170	1952	Map
Quantocks	✓		2,506.9	6,194.5	ST140390	1970	Map
Quants	✓		50.6	126.0	ST185175	1988	Map
Ringdown	✓		4.0	9.9	ST178155	1990	Map
Rodney Stoke	✓	✓	69.6	172.0	ST492507	1957	Map
Roebuck Meadows	✓		3.6	8.9	ST132354	1988	Map
Ruttersleigh	✓		97.0	239.7	ST250165	1991	Map
Sandpit Hole and Bishop's Lot		✓	0.7	1.8	ST531498	1987	Map
Seavington St. Mary		✓	0.3	0.7	ST400144	1971	Map
Severn Estuary ^{[E]} ^{[F]}	✓		15,950.0	39,410.0	ST480830	1976	Map
Shapwick Heath	✓		394.0	973.6	ST430403	1967	Map
Sharpham Moor Plot	✓		0.5	1.3	ST465389	1967	Map
Shepton Montague Railway Cutting		✓	1.6	4.0	ST686316	1992	Map
Snowdon Hill Quarry		✓	0.6	1.6	ST312089	1963	Map
South Exmoor	✓		3,132.7	7,742.3	SS880340	1992	Map
Southey and Gotleigh Moors	✓		81.3	200.1	ST192110	1988	Map
Southlake Moor	✓		196.1	484.6	ST370300	1985	Map
Sparkford Wood	✓		8.4	20.7	ST613275	1954	Map
St. Dunstan's Well Catchment	✓	✓	39.8	98.3	ST668475	1967	Map
Stowell Meadow	✓		2.8	6.9	ST333062	1987	Map
Street Heath	✓		12.5	31.0	ST464394	1966	Map
Tealham and Tadham Moors	✓		917.6	2,267.3	ST420450	1985	Map
Thrupe Lane Swallet		✓	0.5	1.2	ST603458	1992	Map
Thurlbear Wood and Quarrylands	✓		26.7	65.8	ST270210	1963	Map
Twinhills Woods and Meadows	✓		21.2	52.4	ST558432	1990	Map
Vallis Vale	✓	✓	23.9	59.1	ST755490	1952	Map
Viaduct Quarry		✓	0.3	0.8	ST621443	1984	Map
Walton and Ivythorn Hills	✓		34.9	86.1	ST475346	1953	Map
West Moor	✓		213.0	526.3	ST420220	1985	Map
West Sedgemoor	✓		1,016.0	2,510.0	ST361258	1983	Map
Westhay Heath	✓		25.9	64.0	ST415422	1990	Map
Westhay Moor	✓		513.7	1,269.3	ST455445	1971	Map
Wet Moor	✓		491.0	1,214.0	ST448244	1985	Map
Whitevine Meadows	✓		13.0	32.0	ST505085	1979	Map
Windsor Hill Marsh	✓		0.8	2.0	ST619454	1972	Map
Windsor Hill Quarry		✓	0.8	1.9	ST615451	1986	Map
Wookey Hole Caves	✓	✓	39.4	97.4	ST535485	1952	Map
Wookey Station ^{[G]}		✓	<0.1	0.1	ST531464	1997	Map
Woolhayes Farm	✓		13.2	32.5	ST315109	1992	Map
Wurt Pit and Devil's Punchbowl		✓	0.2	0.5	ST543537	1987	Map

== Notes ==
^{A} Data rounded to one decimal place.
^{B} Grid reference is based on the British national grid reference system, also known as OSGB36, and is the system used by the Ordnance Survey.
^{C} Link to maps using the Nature on the Map service provided by English Nature.
^{D} Size smaller than can be shown with one decimal place. Actual size: 0.08 ha.
^{E} The Severn Estuary SSSI overlaps with the following SSSIs:

- Avon: Spring Cove Cliffs, Middle Hope, Portishead Pier to Black Nore and Aust Cliff.
- Gloucestershire: Purton Passage
- South Glamorgan: Penarth Coast

^{F} Incorporates two former SSSIs: Severn Estuary (notified 1976) and part of Brean Down and Uphill Cliff (notified 1952). It was unified as Severn Estuary in 1989.
^{G} Size smaller than can be shown with one decimal place. Actual size: 0.04 ha. (0.1 ac.).
^{H} The Long Dole Wood and Meadows site extends into Bath and North East Somerset and so can be found on the list of SSSIs in Avon.
