= Grove Farm =

Grove Farm may refer to:

in England

- Grove Farm, Somerset
- Grove Farm, Ealing, a Local Nature Reserve in London

in the United States

- Grove Farm (Lihue, Hawaii), listed on the National Register of Historic Places (NRHP)
- Grove Farm Company Locomotives, Puhi, Hawaii, NRHP-listed
- Mount Airy (Sharpsburg, Maryland), also known as, and listed on the NRHP as, Grove Farm
- The Grove School in California, with a campus known as Grove Farm
