= Quarries of the Mendip Hills =

Quarries in the Mendip Hills, Somerset, UK

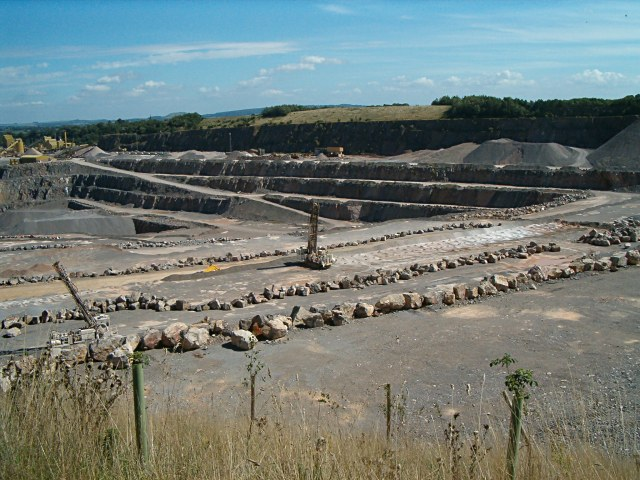
Western extension of Whatley Quarry.

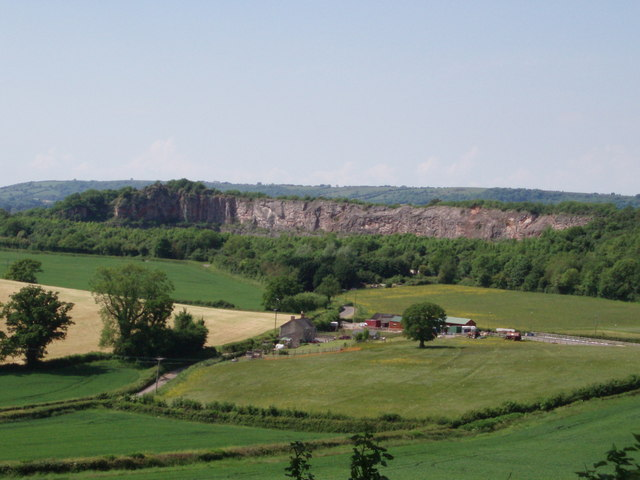
Dulcote Quarry.

The Mendip Hills, (Mendips) in northern Somerset, are the most southerly Carboniferous Limestone uplands in Britain.

The Mendips comprise three major anticlinal structures, each with a core of older Devonian sandstone and Silurian volcanic rocks. The latter, after crushing, is use in road construction and concrete. Devonian Sandstone is visible around Black Down and Downhead. Carboniferous Limestone, dominates the hills and surround the older rock formations. An outcrop of basalt is also quarried at Moon's Hill.

For centuries the stone of the Mendips, and the Cotswolds to the north, have been used to build the cities of Bristol and Bath, and many Somerset towns. As stone transportation is expensive, the Mendips, and Leicestershire, are important as the nearest sources of hard stone for London and the South East.

The Mendip quarries produce twelve million tonnes of stone a year, employ two thousand people, and have an annual turnover of £150m. Five million tonnes of stone per year is transported by Mendip Rail.

== Active quarries ==
Name	Location	Map	owners/operators	Notes
Batts Combe Quarry	Cheddar	ST460550	Hanson Aggregates	
Callow Rock Quarry	Cheddar	ST442558	Bardon Aggregates	
Colemans Quarry	Holwell near Nunney	ST726452	Aggregate Industries	
Doulting Stone Quarry	Doulting	ST648436	Independent business.	
Dulcote Quarry (closed)	Dulcote near Wells	ST565445	Foster Yeoman – Bardon Aggregates	
Halecombe	Leigh-on-Mendip	ST697474	Tarmac	
Gurney Slade Quarry	Gurney Slade between Binegar and Holcombe	ST626497	Morris & Perry (Gurney Slade) Ltd	
Moon's Hill Quarry	Stoke St Michael	ST665460	John Wainwright & Co Ltd	Geological Site of Special Scientific Interest
Torr Works (Merehead)	East Cranmore / Downhead	ST695446	Foster Yeoman – Aggregate Industries	
Whatley Quarry	Whatley	ST731479	Hanson PLC	

== Disused quarries ==
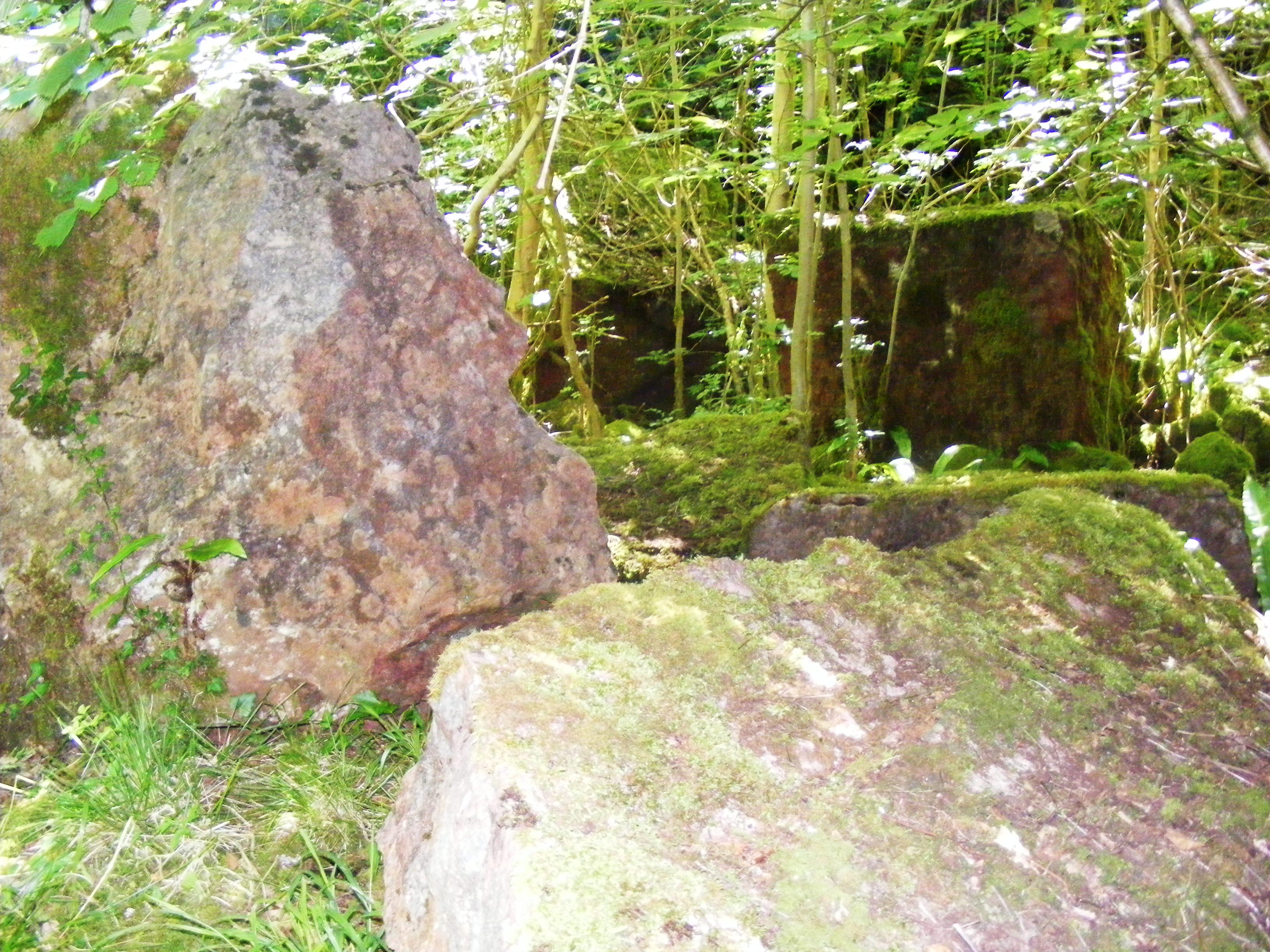
Cliff Quarry, Compton Martin.

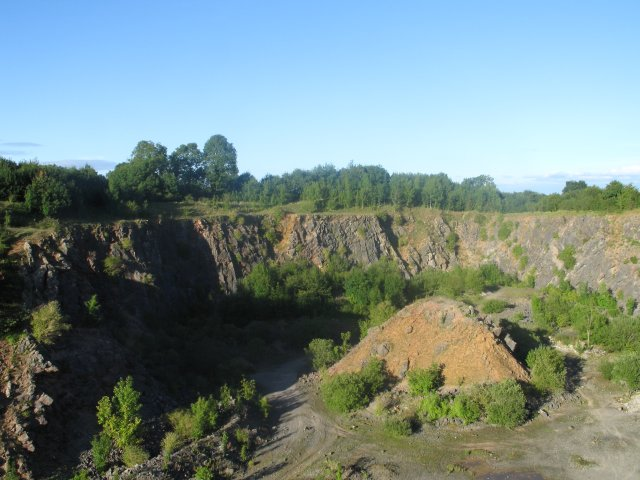
Fairy Cave Quarry.

- Barnclose Quarry
- Brambleditch Quarry
- Cliff Quarry, Compton Martin
- Cloford Quarry — geological Site of Special Scientific Interest
- Cloud Quarry
- Cook's Wood Quarry — geological Site of Special Scientific Interest
- Draycott Quarry
- Emborough Quarries — geological Site of Special Scientific Interest
- Fairy Cave Quarry
- Hobbs Quarry — geological Site of Special Scientific Interest
- Holwell Quarries — geological Site of Special Scientific Interest
- Shipham Quarry
- Underwood Quarry (near Wells)
- Viaduct Quarry — geological Site of Special Scientific Interest
- Waterlip Quarry
- Westbury Quarry
- Windsor Hill Quarry — geological Site of Special Scientific Interest
