= Hobbs Quarry =

Hobbs Quarry may refer to:

- Hobbs Quarry SSSI, Longhope
- Hobbs Quarry SSSI, Shepton Mallet
