= Cogley =

Cogley may refer to:

== People ==
- Josh Dacres-Cogley, English footballer
- Nick Cogley (1869–1936), American actor
- Peter Čögley (born 1988), Slovak footballer

== Places ==
- Cogley Island, Pennsylvania, USA
- Cogley Wood, Somerset, England
