= Church of St Nicholas, Combe St Nicholas =

Church in Somerset, England

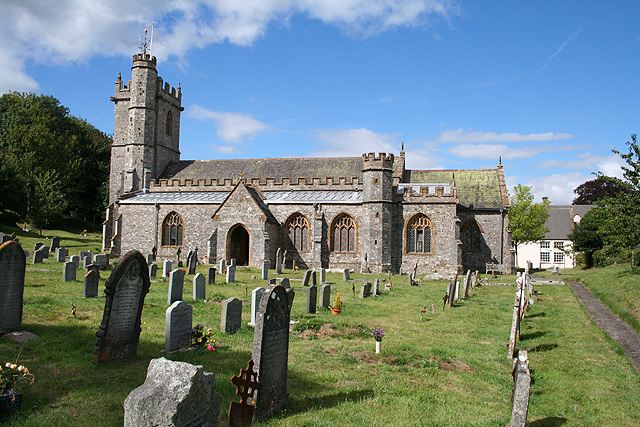

- Location within Somerset
- 50°53′45″N 2°59′36″W
- Location: Combe St Nicholas, Somerset, England

Listed Building – Grade I
- Official name: Church of St Nicholas
- Designated: 4 February 1958
- Reference no.: 1248506

The Church of St Nicholas in Combe St Nicholas, Somerset, England is Norman in origin, with the chancel and lower stage of the tower dating from the 13th century. It was enlarged and aisles added in the 15th century, with further restoration in 1836. It has been designated as a grade I listed building.

There was a church on the site from the Norman Conquest and possibly earlier. The church was dedicated by the Bishop of Waterford with Bishop Jocelin of Wells in 1170.

The Hamstone nave has five bays and holds the font which may have survived from the pre Norman era. The 15th century aisles include a piscina and another font. The carved rood screen dates from around 1470. Beneath the chancel are three vaults which were discovered in 1971. The tower has six bells and a clock dating from 1845. It has battlements, corner pinnacles and gargoyles.

The parish is part of the benefice of Chard, St. Mary with Combe St Nicholas, Wambrook and Whitestaunton within the deanery of Crewkerne and Ilminster.

== See also ==
- Grade I listed buildings in South Somerset
- List of Somerset towers
- List of ecclesiastical parishes in the Diocese of Bath and Wells
