= Seavington St Mary =

Village and civil parish in Somerset, England

Coordinates: 50.9292°N 2.8562°W

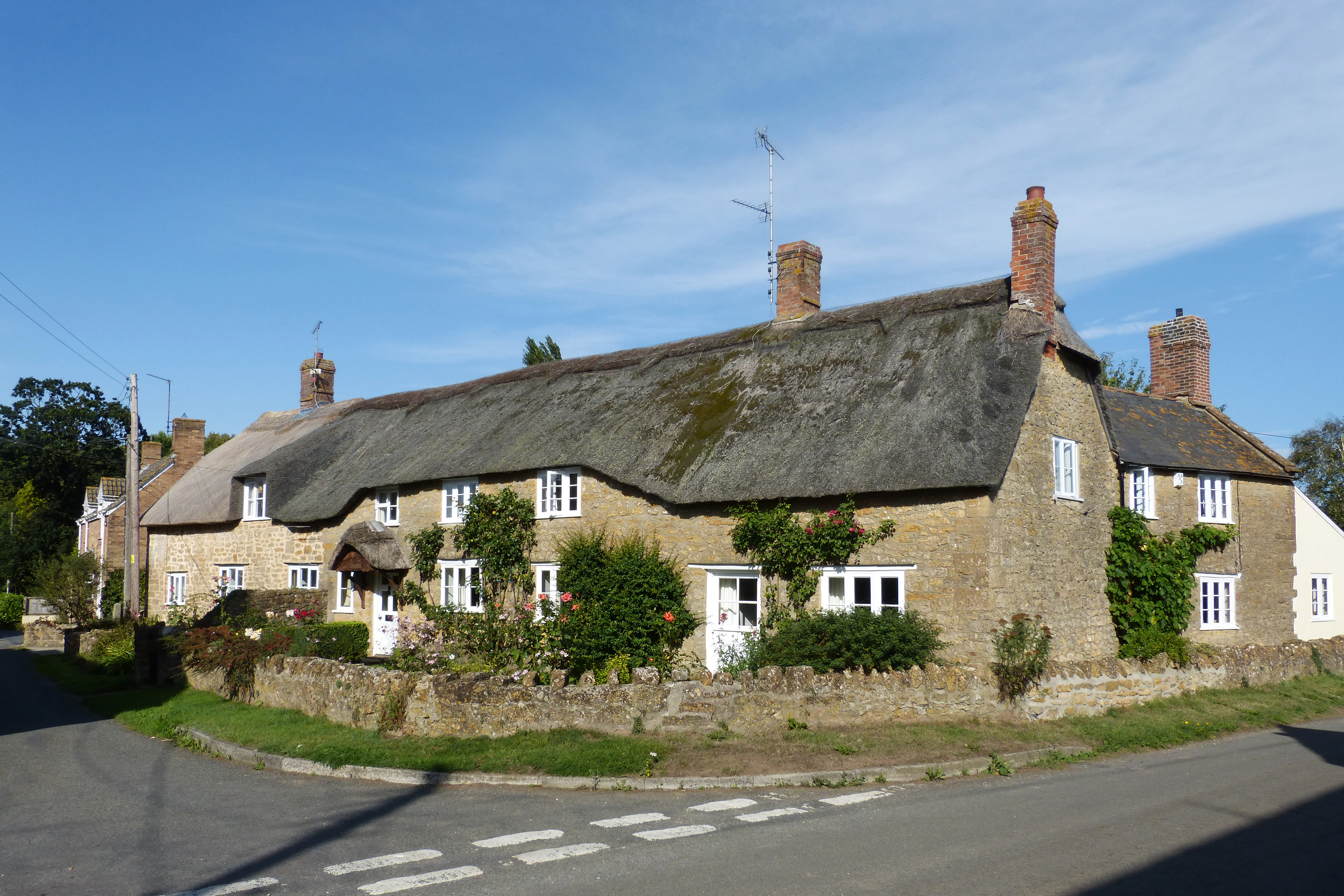
- Listed farmhouse and cottage in Seavington St Mary

- Location within Somerset
- Population: 384
- OS grid reference: ST399147
- Unitary authority: Somerset Council
- Ceremonial county: Somerset
- Region: South West
- Country: England
- Sovereign state: United Kingdom
- Post town: ILMINSTER
- Postcode district: TA19
- Dialling code: 01460
- Police: Avon and Somerset
- Fire: Devon and Somerset
- Ambulance: South Western
- UK Parliament: Yeovil

Seavington St Mary is a village and civil parish in Somerset, England. It is situated next to the village of Seavington St Michael, about 3 miles (4.8 km) east of Ilminster and had a population of 384 inhabitants at the 2011 census.

The villages lie in a hollow within a larger area of low-lying hills and valleys running broadly east-west. A part of the South Petherton Hundred, originally the area included seven settlements (seven tons) which have gradually merged or vanished, but were the origin of the Seavington part of the village name. Even in the 20th century Seavington Abbots was recognised as a separate entity, although it is first recorded in 1030, when it was given by Canute to Athelney Abbey.

== History ==
The manor was held by Alice Vaux around 1200 and was therefore known as Seavington Vaux. The earliest known windmill in Somerset, which was in the village, was given by Robert Vaux to Montacute Priory in 1212. In 1680 it passed to the Welmans of Pundisford (now known as Pitminster), and to the Vaughan Lees of Dillington in 1876.

Since 2000 the village shop closed and plans have been developed for a community owned and run shop have been developed by the Seavington Community Shop and Services Association.

== Governance ==
The parish council has responsibility for local issues, including setting an annual precept (local rate) to cover the council’s operating costs and producing annual accounts for public scrutiny. The parish council evaluates local planning applications and works with the local police, district council officers, and neighbourhood watch groups on matters of crime, security, and traffic. The parish council's role also includes initiating projects for the maintenance and repair of parish facilities, as well as consulting with the district council on the maintenance, repair, and improvement of highways, drainage, footpaths, public transport, and street cleaning. Conservation matters (including trees and listed buildings) and environmental issues are also the responsibility of the council.

For local government purposes, since 1 April 2023, the parish comes under the unitary authority of Somerset Council. Prior to this, it was part of the non-metropolitan district of South Somerset (established under the Local Government Act 1972). It was part of Chard Rural District before 1974.

It is also part of the Yeovil county constituency represented in the House of Commons of the Parliament of the United Kingdom. It elects one Member of Parliament (MP) by the first past the post system of election.

== Geography ==
Seavington St. Mary SSSI is a geological Site of Special Scientific Interest where there are extensive exposures through much of the Inferior Oolite. This is the most westerly outcrop of this formation in England. It is thus of considerable importance in interpreting the local stratigraphy and sedimentology in relation to the palaeogeography of south-west England in Middle Jurassic times. A valuable Aalenian — Bajocian locality affording a prime educational and research facility.

== Religious sites ==
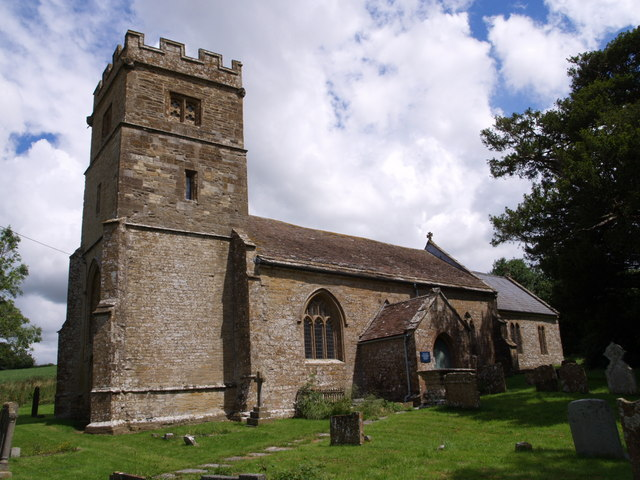
Church of St Mary, Seavington St Mary

The former Anglican parish Church of St Mary has 13th-century origins, but the current building is largely from the late 15th century, with restoration around 1880. Since 1983 it has been vested in the Redundant Churches Fund and is now in the care of the Churches Conservation Trust. It has been designated as a Grade II* listed building. It was previously held as a chapelry of South Petherton by Bruton Abbey and after the dissolution of the monasteries belonged to Bristol Cathedral.
