= Emborough =

Village and civil parish in Somerset, England

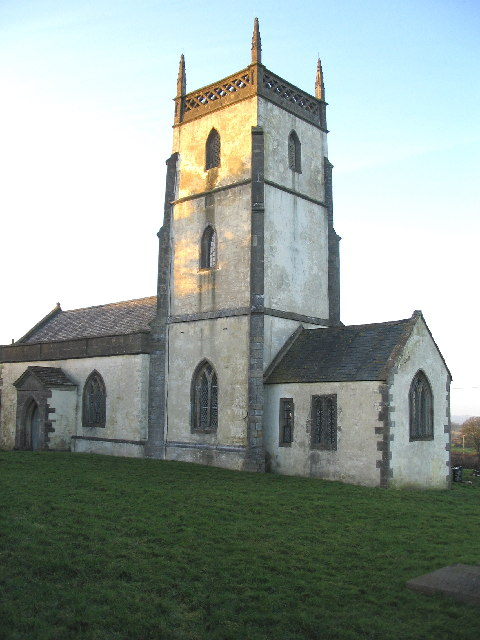
- Church of the Blessed Virgin Mary, Emborough

- Location within Somerset
- Population: 148 (2011)
- OS grid reference: ST615515
- Unitary authority: Somerset Council
- Ceremonial county: Somerset
- Region: South West
- Country: England
- Sovereign state: United Kingdom
- Post town: RADSTOCK
- Postcode district: BA3
- Dialling code: 01761
- Police: Avon and Somerset
- Fire: Devon and Somerset
- Ambulance: South Western
- UK Parliament: Wells and Mendip Hills

Emborough is a village and civil parish 5 miles (8.0 km) north of Shepton Mallet, and 5 miles (8.0 km) north east of Wells, in the county of Somerset, England. It adjoins the parish of Ston Easton. It is situated on the B3139 between Radstock and Wells, just off the A37 road.

== History ==
The name Emborough means smooth hill.

The parish was part of the hundred of Chewton.

The parish includes two manor houses occupied by the Hippisley or Hippisley Coxe families since Elizabethan times. They bought the manor in 1570. The current Manor Farmhouse is medieval in origin, with some early 17th century alteration, and further work in the 19th century.

== Governance ==
The parish meeting has responsibility for local issues, but does not set a precept, nor have any assets, nor costs. The parish meeting evaluates local planning applications and works with the local police, district council officers, and neighbourhood watch groups on matters of crime, security, and traffic. The parish meeting's role includes consulting with the district council on the maintenance, repair, and improvement of highways, drainage, footpaths, public transport, and street cleaning. Conservation matters (including trees and listed buildings) and environmental issues are also the responsibility of the council.

For local government purposes, since 1 April 2023, the parish comes under the unitary authority of Somerset Council. Prior to this, it was part of the non-metropolitan district of Mendip (established under the Local Government Act 1972). It was part of Shepton Mallet Rural District before 1974.

It is also part of the Wells and Mendip Hills county constituency represented in the House of Commons of the Parliament of the United Kingdom. It elects one member of parliament (MP) by the first past the post system of election.

== Geography ==
Emborough is close to the Emborough Quarries Site of Special Scientific Interest.

Emborough Pond
- Lechmere Water
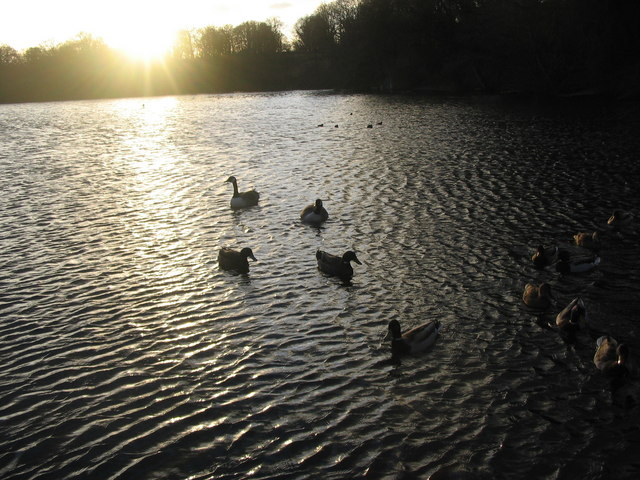

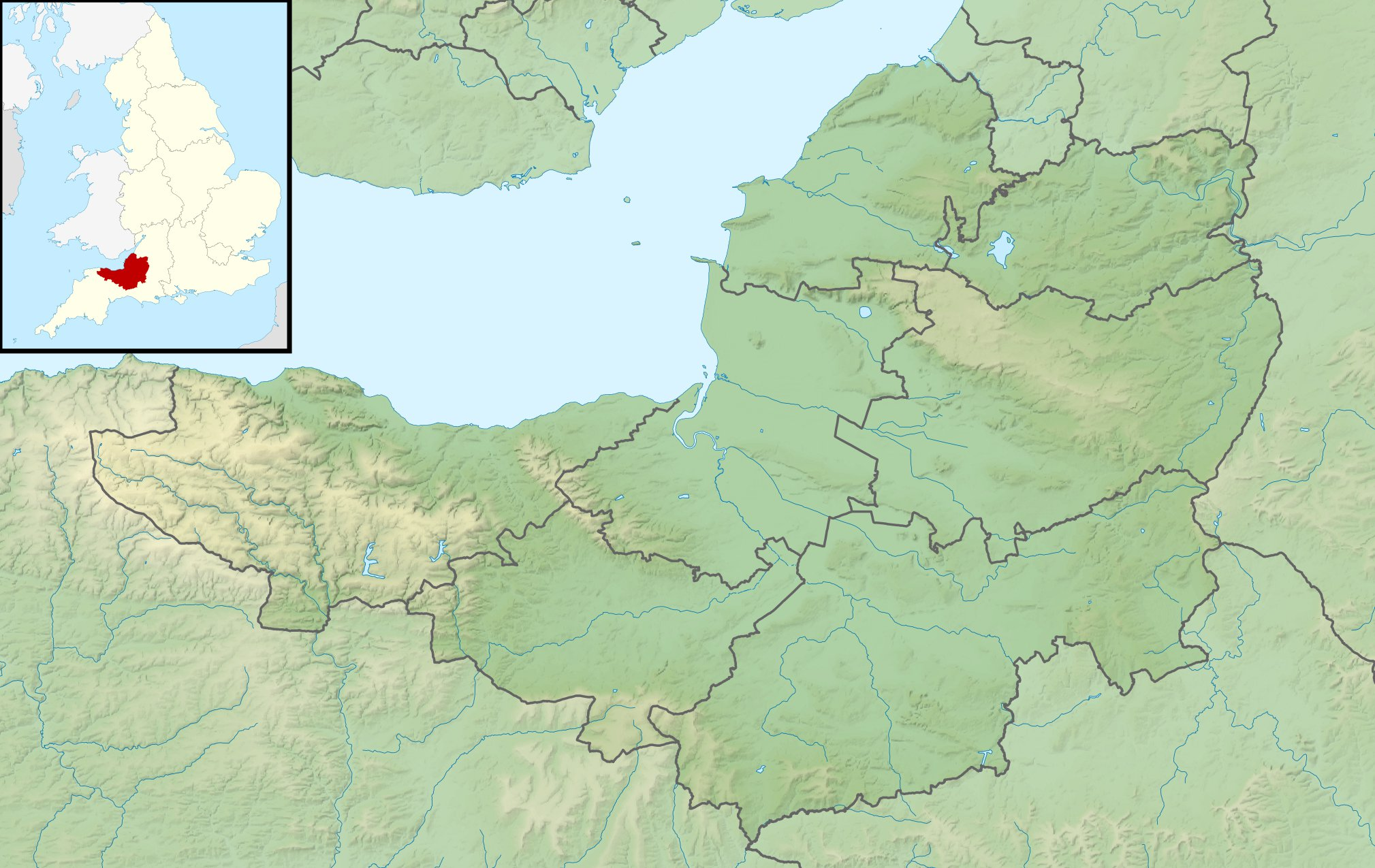
- Location within Somerset
- Location: Somerset
- Coordinates: 51°15′23″N 2°33′13″W
- Basin countries: United Kingdom
- Surface area: 10 acres (4.0 ha)

Emborough Pond (also known as Lechmere Water) is a 10-acre (40,000 m^{2}) lake just south of the village. It was originally a much smaller mill pond. It was held by monks on a 51-year lease from 1525 who stocked it with bream, tench, perch and roach, as they were not allowed to eat meat but were allowed to eat fish. In 1533 locals came and took the fish then throwing down the dam. It is now used for Carp angling.

== Religious sites ==
The parish Church of the Blessed Virgin Mary is medieval in origin but underwent extensive renovation in the 18th century. The inside includes a Georgian gallery and a cast iron "Gurney Stove". It has been designated as a Grade II* listed building. The church is in the care of the Churches Conservation Trust.
