= Cloud Quarry =

Disused quarry in Somerset, England

Coordinates: 51.3179°N 2.5318°W

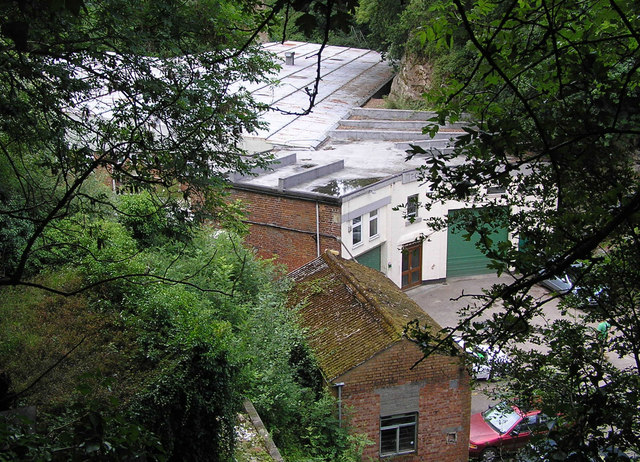
The Shadow factory from above

Cloud Quarry (grid reference ST630577) was a quarry near Temple Cloud, in the limestone of the Mendip Hills, in Somerset, England.

During World War II a factory was built in the disused quarry to make wings and tail planes for Lancaster bombers. Parnell was the company who moved here after their Yate factory was bombed. The roof was painted blue in an attempt to fool German bombers into thinking it was water in a quarry. The factory is now used for light industry and workshops including a trapeze school.

== See also ==
- Quarries of the Mendip Hills
