= Church of St Mary, Seavington St Mary =

Church in Somerset, England

Church of St Mary
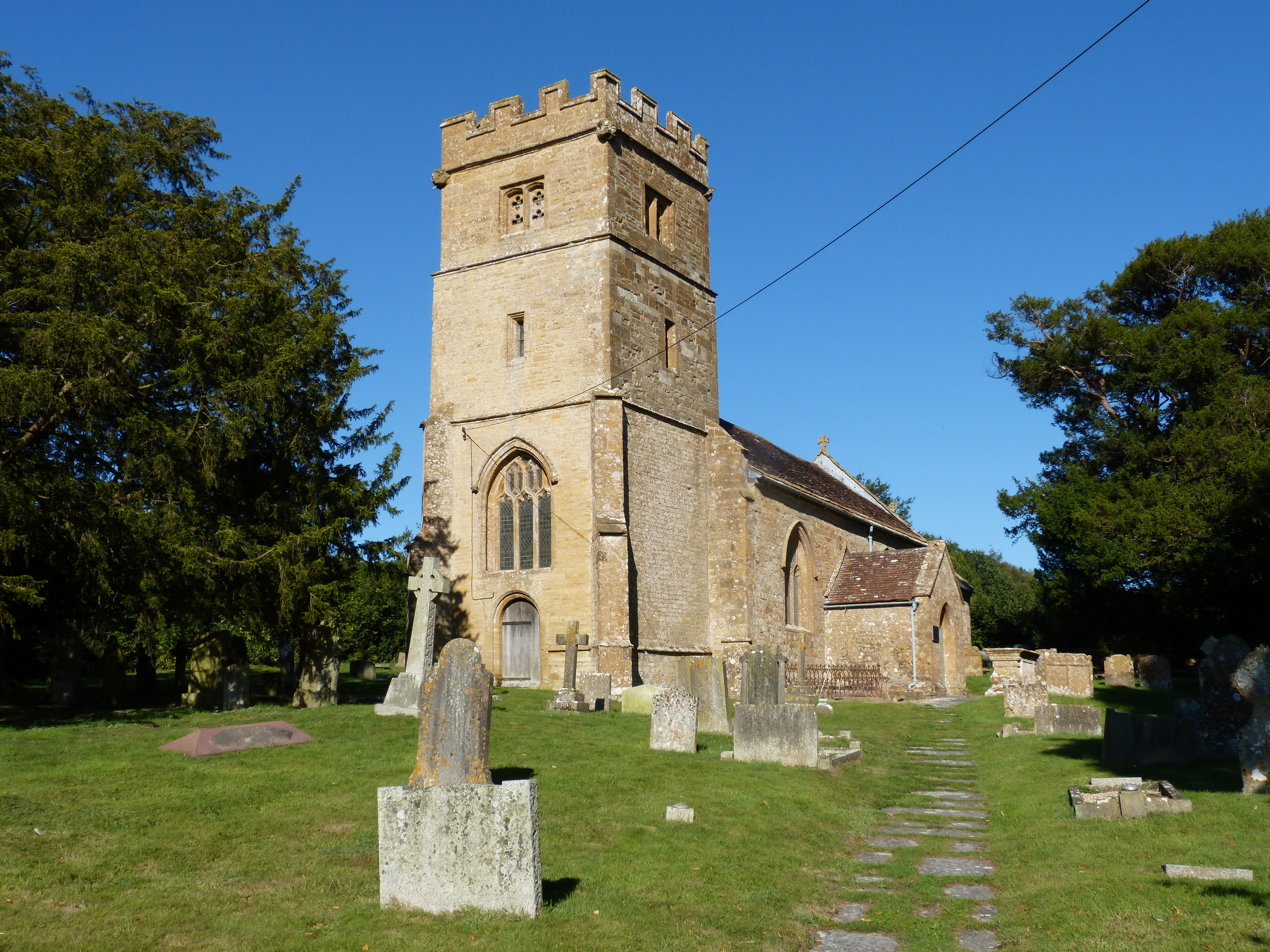

- Location within Somerset
- 50°55′50″N 2°51′04″W
- Location: Seavington St Mary, Somerset, England

History
- Built: 15th century

Site notes
- Governing body: Churches Conservation Trust

Listed Building – Grade II*
- Official name: Church of St Mary
- Designated: 4 February 1958
- Reference no.: 1307339

The Church of St Mary in Seavington St Mary, Somerset, England, dates from the 15th century and is recorded in the National Heritage List for England as a designated Grade II* listed building.

The former Anglican parish Church of St Mary has 13th-century origins, but the current building is largely from the late 15th century, with restoration around 1880. The three-stage tower is from the 16th century, and contains six bells. Three of these date from 1621 and were made by George Purdue of Closworth; the others are from the 20th century, and were made by John Taylor & Co in Loughborough.

The parish was previously held as a chapelry of South Petherton by Bruton Abbey and after the Dissolution of the Monasteries belonged to Bristol Cathedral.

It is a redundant church in the care of the Churches Conservation Trust. The church was declared redundant on 1 July 1983, and was vested in the Trust on 15 May 1985.

== See also ==
- List of churches preserved by the Churches Conservation Trust in South West England
- List of ecclesiastical parishes in the Diocese of Bath and Wells
