= Church of the Blessed Virgin Mary, Emborough =

Church in Somerset, England

Church of the Blessed Virgin Mary
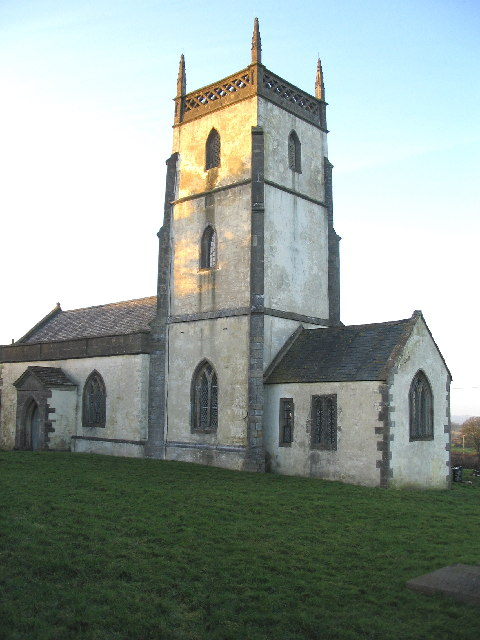

- Location within Somerset
- 51°15′36″N 2°33′14″W
- Location: Emborough, Somerset, England

History
- Built: 12th century

Site notes
- Governing body: Churches Conservation Trust

Listed Building – Grade II*
- Official name: Church of the Blessed Virgin Mary
- Designated: 2 June 1961
- Reference no.: 1177590

The Church of the Blessed Virgin Mary in Emborough, Somerset, England is medieval in origin but underwent extensive renovation in the 18th century. It is recorded in the National Heritage List for England as a designated Grade II* listed building. It is a redundant church in the care of the Churches Conservation Trust. It was declared redundant on 1 August 1978, and was vested in the Trust on 19 December 1979.

It was originally built in the 12th century, with 14th and 18th-century alterations and some further restoration in the 19th century.

The inside includes a Georgian gallery and a cast iron "Gurney Stove".

The recent colour washing of the wall returned the church to its appearance before its Victorian restoration.

== See also ==
- List of churches preserved by the Churches Conservation Trust in South West England
