= Picken's Hole =

Cave in Somerset, England

Coordinates: 51.2910°N 2.8664°W

Picken's Hole is a small cave on the southern side of Crook Peak in the Mendip Hills in the English county of Somerset. It has been designated as a scheduled monument. It has sometimes been confused with a nearby cave called Scragg's Hole, including by the Somerset Historic Environment Record.

The cave is 8 metres (26 ft) below the plateau and 27 metres (89 ft) above the valley floor. It is named after M. J. Picken who found teeth in earth thrown out of their sets in the area by badgers.

A number of Middle Palaeolithic artefacts, and two Neolithic teeth dated to about 4,800 years bp, were recovered from the cave. Faunal deposits of spotted hyena, lion, Arctic fox, mammoth, woolly rhinoceros, horse, reindeer, suslik and northern vole (Microtus oeconomus) from approximately 35,000 BP have also been recovered.
