= Shute Shelve Cavern =

Cave in Somerset, England

Coordinates: 51°17′40″N 2°49′39″W

- Interactive map of Shute Shelve Cavern
- Location: Axbridge
- Depth: 33m
- Length: 0.132km
- Geology: Limestone

Shute Shelve Cavern is a natural cave system located in Shute Shelve Hill, Somerset, England, above Axbridge in the Mendip Hills not far from Cheddar.

The phreatic cave contains fossils of speleothems over 350,000 years old.

It was mined for its yellow ochre which was used as a dye in paint making, until the 1920s, which gave it its alternative name of Axbridge Ochre Mine.

Access is controlled by the Axbridge Caving Group via a locked gate and completely closed during the bats' roosting season.

Chamber 1 has taped areas shows scallops to the right and miners supports and a large geode up to the left. Chamber 2 is a large rift with taped off areas for conservation. Further areas are known as Box Tunnel and Elm Street.

Carcass Cave dig is virtually feet away which used a monorail system, ladders and platforms.

== See also ==
- Caves of the Mendip Hills
