= Callow Rock quarry =

Limestone quarry in Somerset, England

Coordinates: 51°17′55″N 2°47′59″W

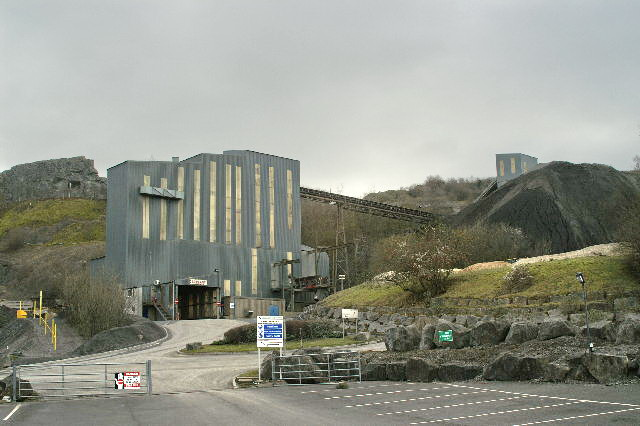
Callow Rock Quarry

Callow Rock quarry is a limestone quarry located in Shipham Gorge between Cheddar and Shipham on the Mendip Hills, Somerset, England.

The quarry has been operating since the early 20th century primarily as a Lime quarry producing a quality product of high purity for the chemical industry. It is now operated by Bardon Aggregates. In 1922 a plant was built to make hydrated lime. It also now contains a large concrete production plant. Local residents driving past on Shipham Hill always know to be wary of treacherous driving conditions caused by mud on the road from quarry vehicle wheels.

== See also ==
- Quarries of the Mendip Hills
