= Colemans Quarry =

Limestone quarry in Somerset, England

Coordinates: 51.20535°N 2.39359°W

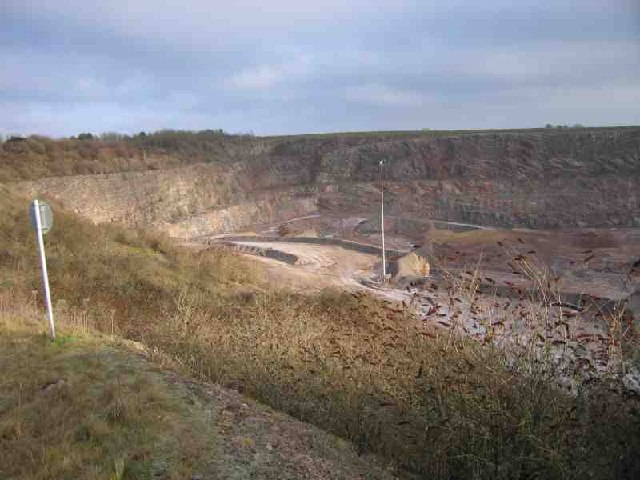
The quarry

Colemans Quarry, grid reference ST726452 is a limestone quarry at Holwell, near Nunney on the Mendip Hills, Somerset, England.

The Colemans Quarry complex comprises four pits separated by three roads (including the A361)

The quarry exhibits pale to dark grey Black Rock, Vallis and Clifton Down Groups of Carboniferous Limestone with overlying buff-coloured Jurassic oolitic limestone forming an angular unconformity. The ancient Jurassic erosion surface at the unconformity contains oyster shells and abundant marine borings in the top of the Carboniferous Limestone. There are near-vertical fissures and joints in the limestone with varying amounts of calcite mineralization. A few of these have been found to contain rare Upper Triassic and Jurassic vertebrate remains. There are abundant shelly fossils and corals.

It came to fame in 1858 when a geologist named Moore purchased three tons of fissure filling, and then spent 3 years sifting and sorting and separated more than one million fossils including 27 small mammal teeth.

Minerals found at the site include Calcite, Goethite, Purple Fluorite, Baryte, Galena, Rhodochrosite and Manganese minerals.

== See also ==
- Quarries of the Mendip Hills
