= Combe St Nicholas =

Village and parish in Somerset, England

Coordinates: 50.8957°N 2.9936°W

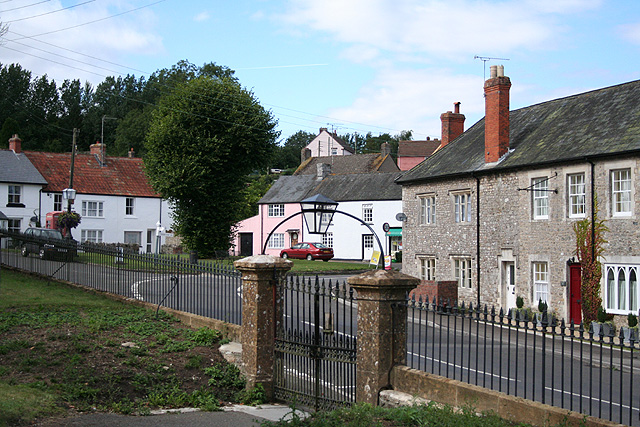
- The village

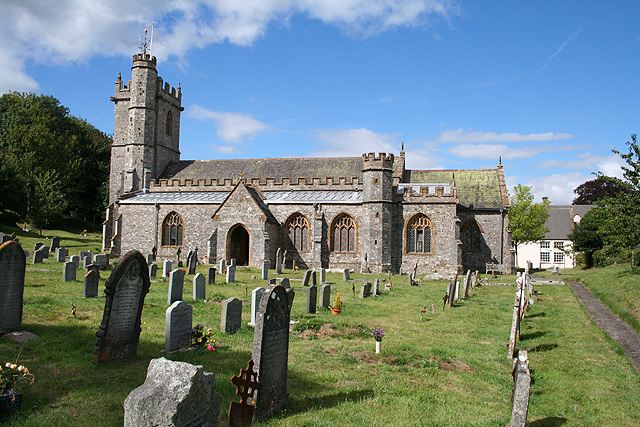
- St Nicholas's church

- Location within Somerset
- Population: 1,373 (2011)
- OS grid reference: ST302111
- Civil parish: Chard
- Unitary authority: Somerset Council
- Ceremonial county: Somerset
- Region: South West
- Country: England
- Sovereign state: United Kingdom
- Post town: CHARD
- Postcode district: TA20
- Dialling code: 01460
- Police: Avon and Somerset
- Fire: Devon and Somerset
- Ambulance: South Western
- UK Parliament: Yeovil

Combe St Nicholas is a village and parish in Somerset, England, situated 2 miles (3.2 km) northwest of Chard and 10 miles (16 km) from Taunton, on the edge of the Blackdown Hills Area of Outstanding Natural Beauty. The parish, which includes Wadeford and Scrapton, has a population of 1,373.

== History ==
There are also the remains of a Roman Villa in the town known as Wadeford Roman villa which is scheduled as an ancient monument.

At the time of the Domesday Book the manor was held by Bishop Gisa. The parish was known as Combe Episcopi until the dedication of the church to St Nicholas in 1239.

== Governance ==
The parish council has responsibility for local issues, including setting an annual precept (local rate) to cover the council's operating costs and producing annual accounts for public scrutiny. The parish council evaluates planning applications and works with the police, district council officers, and neighbourhood watch groups on matters of crime, security, and traffic. The parish council's role also includes initiating projects for the maintenance and repair of parish facilities, as well as consulting with the district council on the maintenance, repair, and improvement of highways, drainage, footpaths, public transport, and street cleaning. Conservation matters (including trees and listed buildings) and environmental issues are also the responsibility of the council.

For local government purposes, since 1 April 2023, the parish comes under the unitary authority of Somerset Council. Prior to this, it was part of the non-metropolitan district of South Somerset (established under the Local Government Act 1972). It was part of Chard Rural District before 1974.

The village falls within the 'Blackdown' electoral ward. This ward stretches north west to Buckland St Mary and south to Wambrook. The total ward population at the 2011 Census was 2,334.

It is also part of the Yeovil county constituency represented in the House of Commons of the Parliament of the United Kingdom. It elects one Member of Parliament (MP) by the first-past-the-post system of election.

== Geography ==
To the east of the village is Woolhayes Farm, a biological Site of Special Scientific Interest.

The source of the River Isle is at Scrapton.

== Religious sites ==
The Church of St Nicholas is Norman in origin, with the chancel and lower stage of the tower dating from the 13th century. It was enlarged with aisles added in the 15th century, and received further restoration in 1836. It has been designated by English Heritage as a Grade I listed building.

== Sport ==
The village is home to Combe St Nicholas FC, who play Sunday league football in the local area. The club plays at Slade's Cross and fields four men's teams, a women's team and eleven youth teams.
