= Kingdown and Middledown =

Protected area in Somerset, England

- Site of Special Scientific Interest
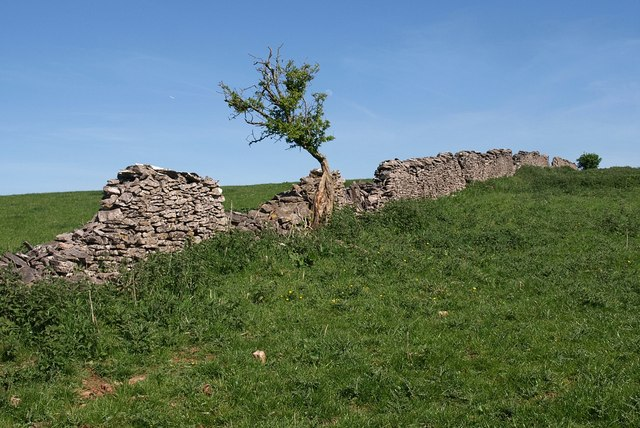

- Location within Somerset
- Location of Kingdown and Middledown.
- Area of search: Somerset
- Grid reference: ST480532
- Coordinates: 51.27556°N 2.74685°W
- Interest: Biological
- Area: 5.7 hectares (0.057 km^{2}; 0.022 sq mi)
- Notification date: 1991

Kingdown and Middledown (grid reference ST480532) is a 5.7 hectare (14.1 acre) biological Site of Special Scientific Interest near Cheddar in the Mendip Hills, Somerset, notified in 1991.

This site, which is in two parts, is situated on the plateau of the Mendip Hills and supports populations of two nationally rare plant species. Kingdown is at the end of a dry valley where Carboniferous Limestone outcrops as a small cliff, opposite which is a small disused limestone quarry. Covering some of the rock outcrops are clumps of Cheddar Pink (Dianthus gratianopolitanus), which is a nationally rare species. The nationally scarce species Soft-leaved Sedge (Carex montana) and Cheddar Bedstraw (Galium fleurotii) are also found here.
