= Godminster Lane Quarry and Railway Cutting =

Geological Site of Special Scientific Interest in Somerset, England

- Site of Special Scientific Interest
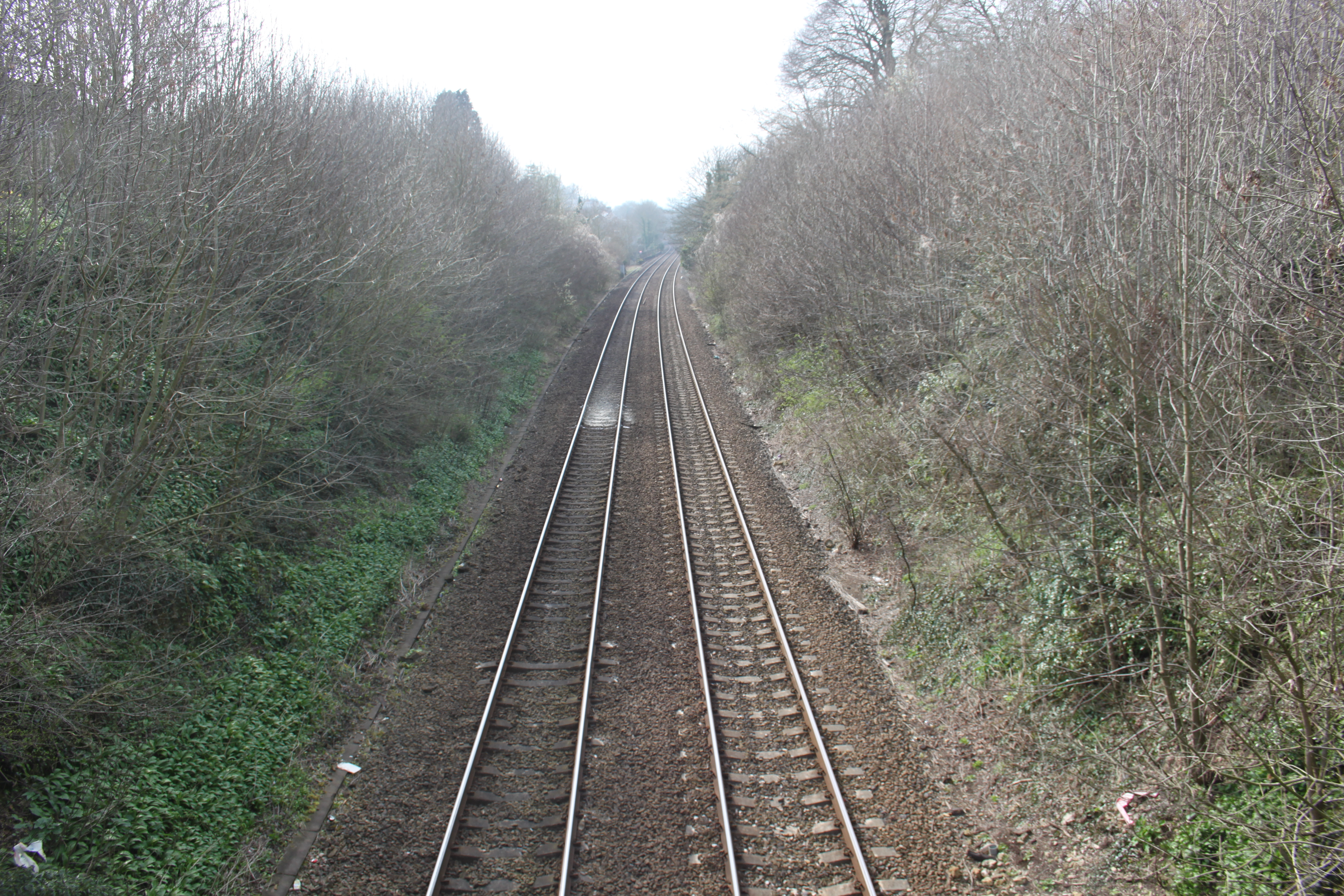

- Location within Somerset
- Location of Godminster Lane Quarry and Railway Cutting.
- Area of search: Somerset
- Grid reference: ST682345
- Coordinates: 51.1094°N 2.4549°W
- Interest: Geological
- Area: 0.8 hectares (0.0080 km^{2}; 0.0031 sq mi)
- Notification date: 1971

Godminster Lane Quarry and Railway Cutting (grid reference ST682345) is a 0.8 hectare geological Site of Special Scientific Interest at Pitcombe in Somerset, notified in 1971.

This is an important locality for study of the Inferior Oolite limestones, of Middle Jurassic age, laid down in a warm shallow sea some 175 million years ago. The site is unique in that the limestones seen here are much more closely comparable with rocks of similar age found in the Cotswolds than with rock sequences seen elsewhere in Somerset. However, the rocks do contain the rich assemblage of fossil ammonites which are typical of the north Dorset/south Somerset area and it is this feature, combined with the unusual limestone sequence, which makes this site unique. It is also important as a reference site for three sub-divisions (zones) of the Inferior Oolite — the laeviscula, discites and concavum Zones.

== See also ==
- Bruton Railway Cutting
