= Windsor Hill Quarry =

Geological Site of Special Scientific Interest in Somerset, England

- Site of Special Scientific Interest
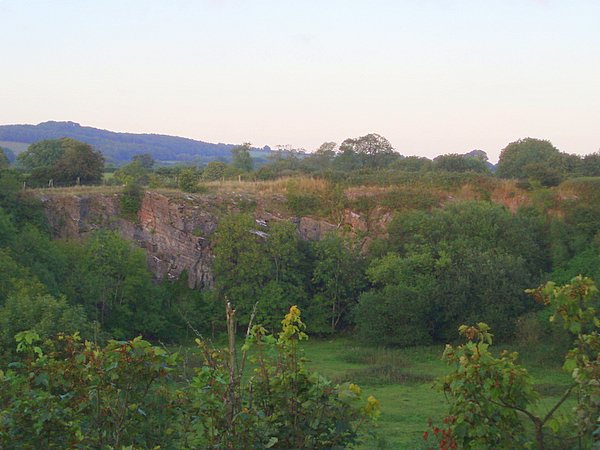

- Location within Somerset
- Location of Windsor Hill Quarry.
- Area of search: Somerset
- Grid reference: ST615451
- Coordinates: 51.20381°N 2.55246°W
- Interest: Geological
- Area: 0.8 hectares (0.0080 km^{2}; 0.0031 sq mi)
- Notification date: 1971

Windsor Hill Quarry (grid reference ST615451) is a 0.8 hectare geological Site of Special Scientific Interest near Shepton Mallet on the Mendip Hills in Somerset, adjacent to the Windsor Hill Marsh biological Site of Special Scientific Interest. It was notified in 1971.

It is a Geological Conservation Review site for vertebrate studies in which examples of the tritylodont Oligokyphus were identified.

The disused quarry was connected to the Somerset and Dorset Joint Railway until 1957 when the sidings were removed.

== See also ==
- Quarries of the Mendip Hills
