= Emborough Quarries =

Geological Site of Special Scientific Interest in Somerset, England

- Site of Special Scientific Interest
- Location within Somerset
- Location of Emborough Quarries.
- Area of search: Somerset
- Grid reference: ST623505
- Coordinates: 51.2524°N 2.5416°W
- Interest: Geological
- Area: 1 hectare (0.010 km^{2}; 0.0039 sq mi)
- Notification date: 1971

Emborough Quarries (grid reference ST623505) is a 1 hectare (2.5 acre) geological Site of Special Scientific Interest at Emborough in the Mendip Hills, Somerset, notified in 1971.

The disused quarry has yielded a wide variety of remains of vertebrate fossils, amongst which the early reptiles are particularly well represented. Of special note is Kuehneosaurus latus which is one of the earliest-known flying vertebrates. During the Triassic period of geological time, some 230 million years ago, the limestones now exposed on Mendip formed upland areas upon which a number of large rivers rose. Solution cavities were soon created in the land surface and material from the surrounding area was swept into the newly formed cave systems. Remains of the creatures living in the upland areas during this time were swept into these deposits and have now been exhumed by recent quarrying activities. Fresh material is brought to the surface with every rock fall and Emborough Quarries are a nationally important source of fossil vertebrate remains for research and study.

This former Mendip quarry site, probably owned by Emborough Stone Co., a branch of Roads Reconstruction, Ltd., where iron ore was once mined is now home to an assembly of contractor's plant (possibly of Richard Wood (Engineering) Ltd), cranes and machine tools. It is the location of Nettlebridge Viaduct, a seven-arch bridge that once carried the Somerset and Dorset Railway.

The site was owned by Emborough Stone Co which was later bought by Roads Reconstruction Ltd. The rock quarried was carboniferous mountain limestone which was used for construction and railway ballast. There are 2 main quarries and several trial quarries. The site was previously used by the Emborough Brick Co for making clay bricks.

== Blatchford Light Railway ==
The Blatchford Light Railway narrow-gauge railway is located within the quarry. This 2 ft 6 in (762 mm) gauge railway was originally intended to serve a pre-cast concrete plant in the quarry, but after that enterprise failed, it was retained as a private railway. The line starts at an industrial building in the No. 1 quarry, passes under Nettlebridge Viaduct and loops round the lake in No. 2 quarry. The following industrial locomotives were present in 2011:

Name/ Number	Gauge	Builder	Type	Date	Works number	Notes
	4 ft 8 1/2 in (1,435 mm)	Yorkshire Engine Company	0-6-0DE	1957	2641	Ex Port of London Authority no 205 based at Tilbury Docks,
Yard No. 24	2 ft 6 in (762 mm)	Hunslet Engine Company	0-4-0DM	1939	2017	
Yard No. B6 / ND 3055	2 ft 6 in (762 mm)	Hunslet Engine Company	0-4-0DM	1940	2266	From RNAD Broughton Moor now at Sittingbourne and Kemsley Light Railway
ND 3060	2 ft 6 in (762 mm)	Hunslet Engine Company	0-4-0DM	1941	2398	From RNAD Broughton Moor
Yard No. 1075	2 ft 6 in (762 mm)	Hunslet Engine Company	4wDH	1976	7447	Now with Glyn Valley Tramway Trust
Yard No. 1073	2 ft 6 in (762 mm)	Hunslet Engine Company	4wDH	1976	7450	
Yard No. 1074	2 ft 6 in (762 mm)	Hunslet Engine Company	4wDH	1976	7451	
	2 ft 6 in (762 mm)	Hunslet Engine Company	4wDH	1981	9057	Rack locomotive
Tinkabell	2 ft 6 in (762 mm)	Ruston & Hornsby	4wDM	1956	398101	Now at Gunpowder Railway
L4134	2 ft 6 in (762 mm)	Wickham	2w-2PM	1942	3174	
	750 mm (2 ft 5 1/2 in)	GIA Industria AB	4wDH	1966	55134	
Corris	2 ft 4 in (711 mm)	Ruston Hornsby	4wDM	1956	398102	Purchased from Gloddfa Ganol.

== See also ==
- Quarries of the Mendip Hills
