= Moon's Hill Quarry =

Geological Site of Special Scientific Interest in Somerset, England

- Site of Special Scientific Interest
- Location within Somerset
- Location of Moon's Hill Quarry.
- Area of search: Somerset
- Grid reference: ST665460
- Coordinates: 51.21221°N 2.48097°W
- Interest: Geological
- Area: 3.42 hectares (0.0342 km^{2}; 0.0132 sq mi)
- Notification date: 1996

Moon's Hill Quarry (grid reference ST665460) is a 3.42 hectare geological Site of Special Scientific Interest at Stoke St Michael in Somerset, notified in 1996 and is a Geological Conservation Review site.

The quarry covers some 240 acres (0.97 km^{2}), and is operated by John Wainwright & Co Ltd which purchased it in 1897 and has operated it continuously ever since. The quarry produces Basalt Aggregate known as hardstone and is used for the surface course, the top layer of the road surface.

== See also ==
- Quarries of the Mendip Hills
