= Bruton railway cutting =

Geological site in Bruton, Somerset, England

Bruton Railway Cutting
- Site of Special Scientific Interest
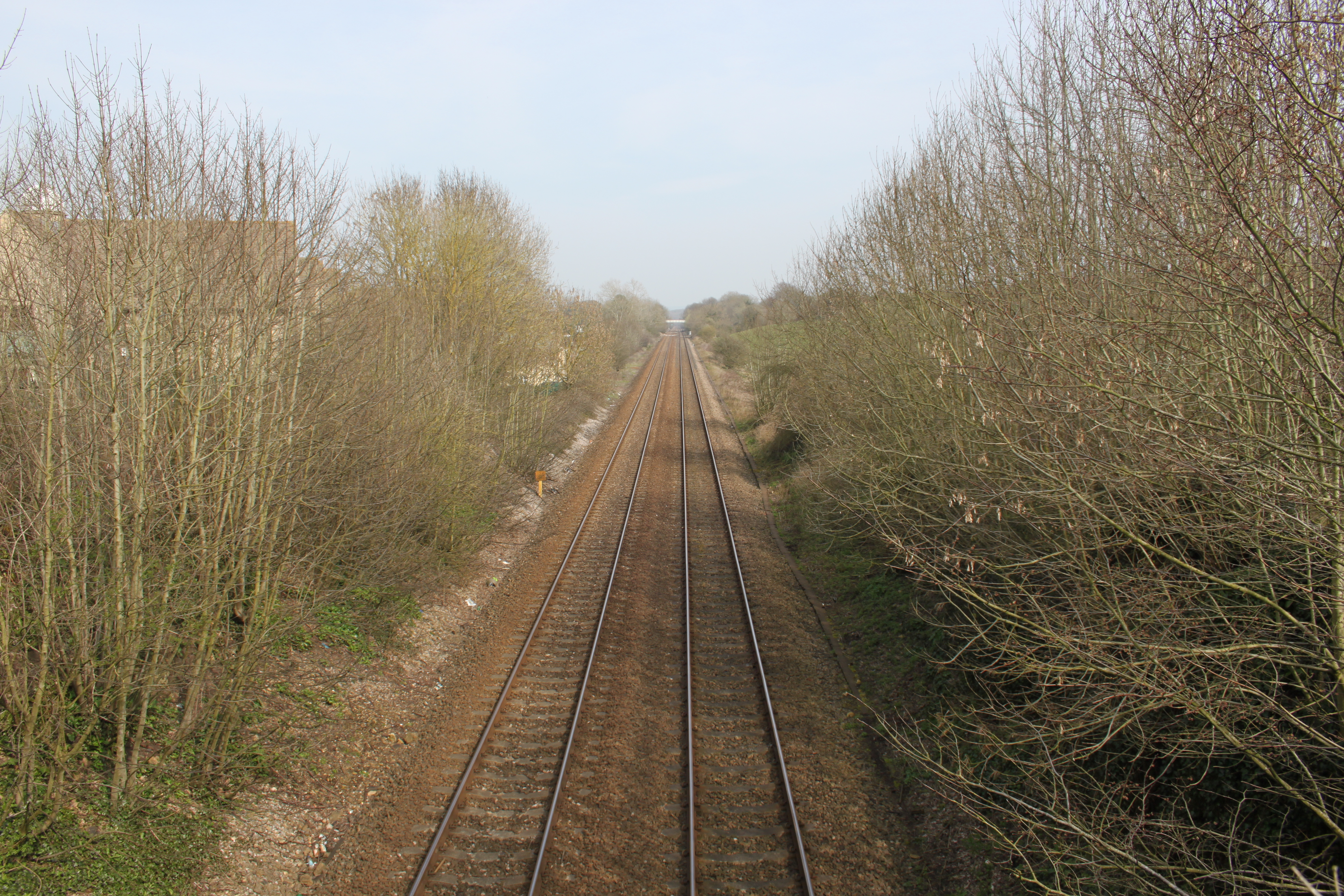

- Location within Somerset
- Location of Bruton Railway Cutting.
- Area of search: Somerset
- Grid reference: ST688348
- Coordinates: 51.11164°N 2.44707°W
- Interest: Geological
- Area: 1.7 hectares (0.017 km^{2}; 0.0066 sq mi)
- Notification date: 1971

Bruton Railway Cutting is a 1.7 hectare geological Site of Special Scientific Interest at Bruton in Somerset, notified in 1971.

The geology exposed in the area near Bruton station (which opened in 1856 on what is now the Heart of Wessex Line) is from the Bathonian epoch of the Middle Jurassic. The citation for the site describes it as one of the best places in England to demonstrate the stratigraphic distinction of ammonites in the subcontractus zone and the morrisi zone.

== See also ==
- Wookey Station
- Godminster Lane Quarry and Railway Cutting
