= Hurcott Lane Cutting =

Geological site in Somerset, England

- Site of Special Scientific Interest
- Location within Somerset
- Location of Hurcott Lane Cutting.
- Area of search: Somerset
- Grid reference: ST398163
- Coordinates: 50.94298°N 2.85823°W
- Interest: Geological
- Area: 0.48 hectares (0.0048 km^{2}; 0.0019 sq mi)
- Notification date: 1996

Hurcott Lane Cutting (grid reference ST398163) is a 0.48 hectare geological Site of Special Scientific Interest in Somerset, England, notified in 1996.

== Sources ==
- English Nature citation sheet for the site (accessed 9 August 2006)
