= Underwood Quarry =

Limestone quarry in Somerset, England

Coordinates: 51.2183°N 2.6599°W

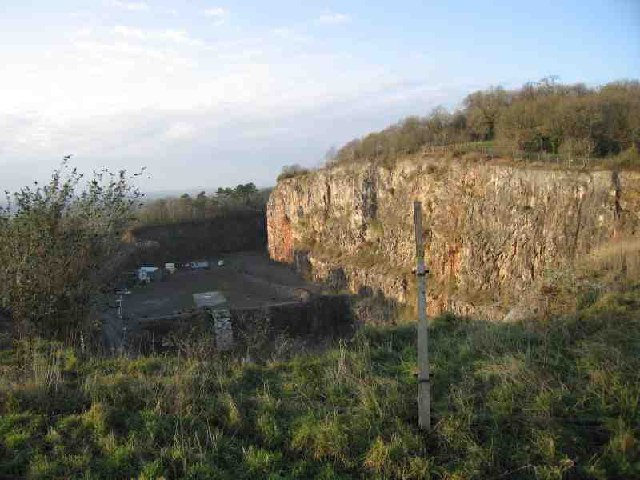
Underwood Quarry - geograph.org.uk - 94647

Underwood Quarry is a former quarry near Wells, Somerset on the southern edge of the Mendip Hills that produced Carboniferous Limestone. The rock was described as having very little faulting and a consistent nature, and as being ideal for road making and maintenance.

== History ==
The quarry was opened during the First World War by the Wells Stone Company who leased the land from Lord Brougham and Vaux. In 1919 the 12-acre site and plant was sub-leased by the Somerset County Council to support their road building and maintenance activities, paying a royalty to Wells Stone for the rock extracted.

In 1922 the Somerset County Council opened their Wookey Stone Sidings on the Cheddar Valley railway line to serve the quarry. Stone was carried by means of an aerial ropeway to the sidings. The ropeway became redundant in 1936 and was dismantled in 1948. Some 350,000 tons were transported by the ropeway.

The site was purchased by the council in 1932 and by 1939 they controlled 100 acres of surrounding land. By 1948 the quarry face had extended to a length of 900 feet and was 110 feet deep. To provide work during times when it was too wet for quarry operations, a precast concrete plant was established. In 1932 the quarry employed 118 men. In 1971 the quarry was producing a quarter million tons of stone per annum.

== Central Repair Depot ==
The Council sited its Central Repair Depot at the quarry. As well as looking after quarry plant, it was also responsible for all of the county vehicles. Initially this was steam rollers and steam wagons, but by 1950 the fleet included 371 highways vehicles, 249 fire brigade vehicles, 75 school meals vans and 70 ambulances.

== Thales Underwood Quarry Range ==
After the quarry closed, Thales UK operated a radar signature measurement range for the evaluation of radar signatures of large targets. Capabilities included turntables capable of handling loads up to 75 tonnes, a retractable pylon up to 0.675 tonne and an overhead suspension cable for targets up to 50 kg. The range was described as 200 metres wide and 50 metres deep and offered very low external electrical noise interference levels.
