= Freshmoor =

Protected area in Somerset, England

- Site of Special Scientific Interest
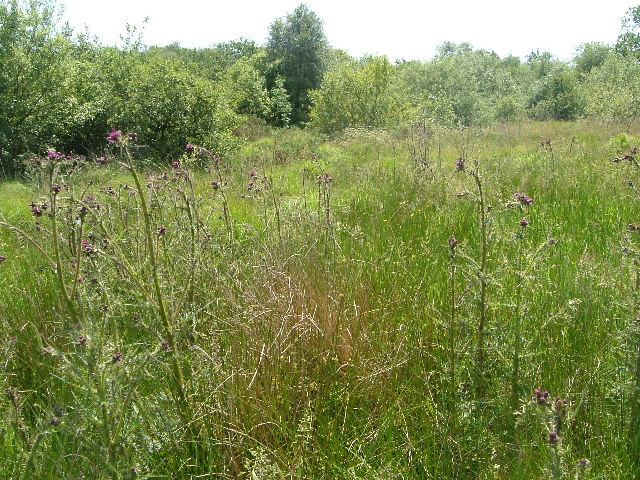

- Location within Somerset
- Location of Freshmoor.
- Area of search: Somerset
- Grid reference: ST280125
- Coordinates: 50.90746°N 3.02540°W
- Interest: Biological
- Area: 11.2 hectares (0.112 km^{2}; 0.043 sq mi)
- Notification date: 1989

Freshmoor (grid reference ST280125) is an 11.2 hectare (27.7 acre) biological Site of Special Scientific Interest in Somerset, notified in 1989.

Freshmoor is one of the few remaining areas of unimproved wet acid-grassland and mire on the Blackdown Hills.
