= Maes Down =

Geological site in Somerset, UK

- Site of Special Scientific Interest
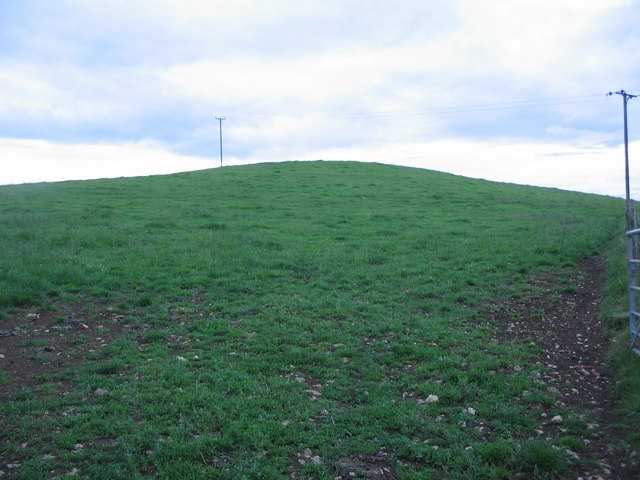

- Location within Somerset
- Location of Maes Down.
- Area of search: Somerset
- Grid reference: ST647406
- Coordinates: 51.16355°N 2.50621°W
- Interest: Geological
- Area: 0.2 hectares (0.0020 km^{2}; 0.00077 sq mi)
- Notification date: 1985

Maes Down (grid reference ST647406) is a 0.2 hectare geological Site of Special Scientific Interest between Shepton Mallet and Stoney Stratton in Somerset, notified in 1985. It is a Geological Conservation Review site.

The rocks seen at Maes Down were laid down about 190 million years ago, during the Upper Pliensbachian and Lower Toarcian Stages of the Jurassic Period of geological times, when this part of Britain lay beneath the sea.
