= Windsor Hill Marsh =

Protected area in Somerset, England

- Site of Special Scientific Interest
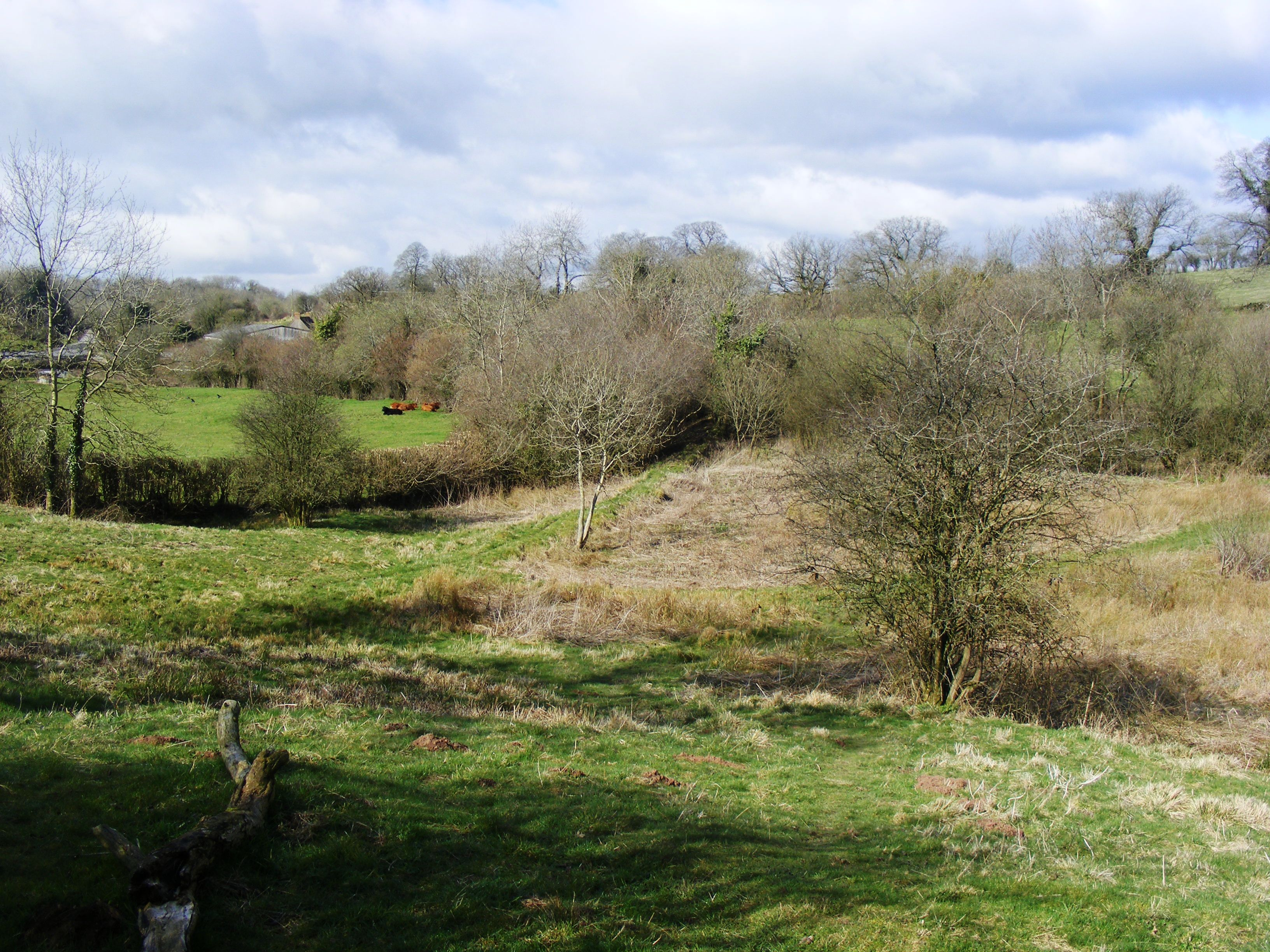

- Location within Somerset
- Location of Windsor Hill Marsh.
- Area of search: Somerset
- Grid reference: ST619454
- Coordinates: 51.20653°N 2.54676°W
- Interest: Biological
- Area: 0.84 hectares (0.0084 km^{2}; 0.0032 sq mi)
- Notification date: 1972

Windsor Hill Marsh (grid reference ST619454) is a 0.84 hectare biological Site of Special Scientific Interest, north of the town of Shepton Mallet in Somerset, and adjacent to the Windsor Hill Quarry geological Site of Special Scientific Interest. It was notified in January 1972.

Windsor Hill Marsh is a marshy silted pond, with adjacent damp, slightly acidic grassland. Adjoining the marsh are a limestone bank, and a short stream which flows into a swallet.

== Biological interest ==
The site is of interest for its diverse flora, in large part down to the varied habitats present within the small area. English Nature's SSSI citation sheet states that 114 species have been found at the site. Two species are present which are rare in Somerset: flatsedge (Blysmus compressus) and slender spike-rush (Eleocharis uniglumis). Flatsedge was discovered here in 1946 by Humphry Bowen. This species occurs at no other site in Somerset. Slender spike-rush was discovered in 1972 by Florence Gravestock, and is only found at one other site in Somerset, West Sedgemoor. Both species were still present in 2004. Other marshland plants found here include purple loosestrife, yellow flag (Iris pseudacorus), hard rush (Juncus inflexus), soft rush (Juncus effusus), flowering rush (Butomus umbellatus), devil's-bit scabious (Succisa pratensis), three species of horsetail Equisetum spp. and seven sedges Carex spp.

== Sources ==
- English Nature citation sheet for the site (accessed 25 July 2006)
- Green, Paul (2004) "Local Meetings 2004: Windsor Hill Marsh and Ham Woods, Shepton Mallet, 31st July" Wild Flower Society Magazine (Spring 2005) p38 Online version
- Green, Paul R., Ian P. Green and Geraldine A. Crouch (1997) The Atlas Flora of Somerset ISBN 0-9531324-0-4
