= Moorlinch SSSI =

Protected area in Somerset, England

Moorlinch
- Site of Special Scientific Interest
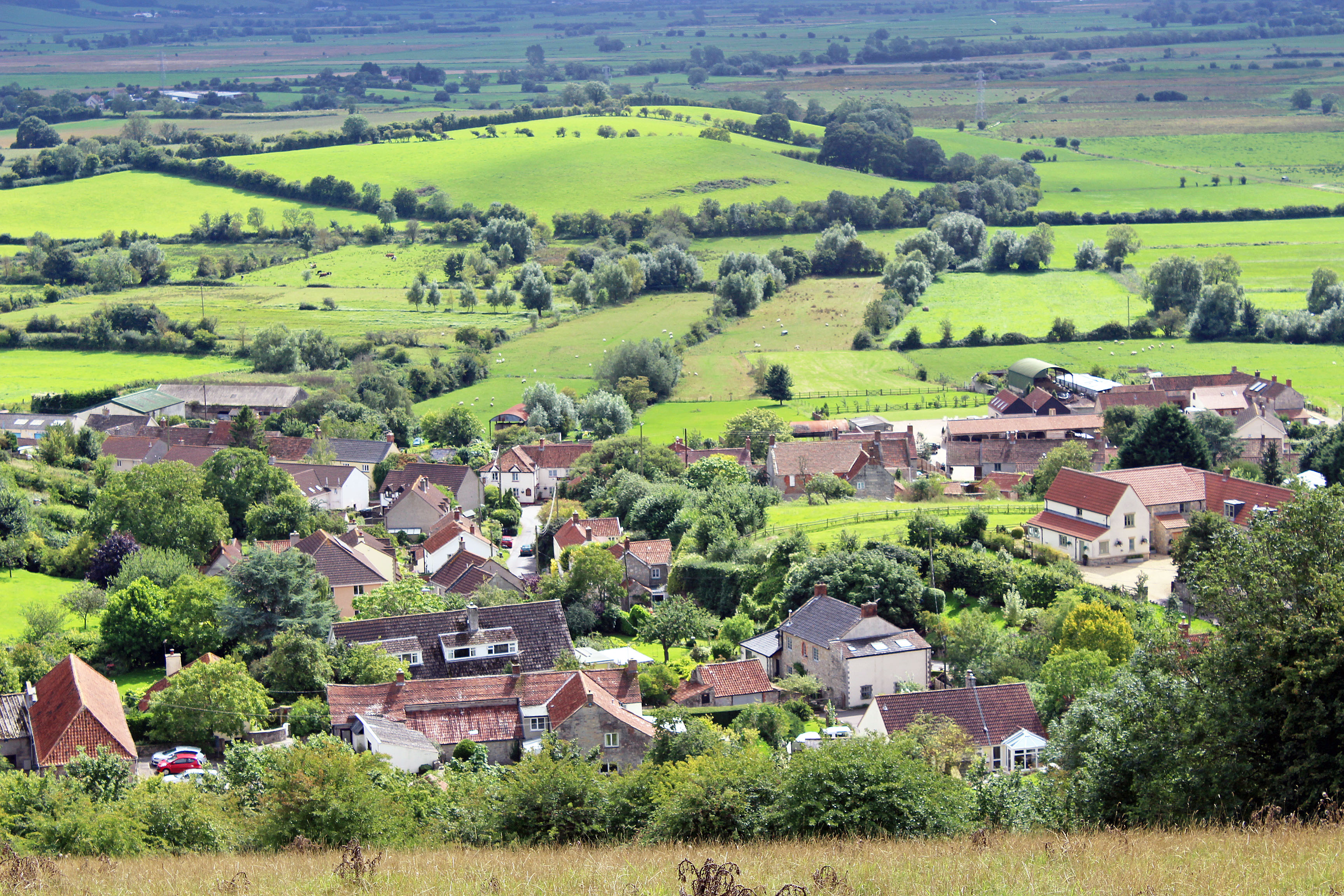

- Location within Somerset
- Location of Moorlinch.
- Area of search: Somerset
- Grid reference: ST390360
- Coordinates: 51.12002°N 2.87293°W
- Interest: Biological
- Area: 226 hectares (2.26 km^{2}; 0.87 sq mi)
- Notification date: 1985

Moorlinch (grid reference ST390360) is a 226.0 hectare (558.4 acre) biological Site of Special Scientific Interest at Moorlinch in Somerset, notified in 1985.

Moorlinch is part of the extensive grazing marsh grasslands and ditch systems of the Somerset Levels and Moors. Lying in the Parrett Basin at the foot of the Polden Hills, the area drains by gravity into the King’s Sedgemoor Drain. The water table is high for most of the year with frequent winter flooding from high ground and surface water remaining on many fields throughout the winter and early spring. Moorlinch contains a good proportion of botanically rich ditch systems. Regularly maintained field ditches are often species-rich and diverse. Notable species include Lesser Water-plantain (Baldellia ranunculoides), Tubular Water-dropwort (Oenanthe fistulosa) and Hairlike Pondweed (Potamogeton trichoides). The channels and banksides support a rich fauna; rare species include the water beetle (Hydrophilus piceus) and the soldier fly (Odontomyia ornata). Large populations of dragonflies and damselflies occur, including the Hairy Dragonfly (Brachytron pratense) and the Variable Damselfly (Coenagrion pulchellum).
