= Seavington St. Mary SSSI, Somerset =

Protected area in Somerset, England

Seavington St. Mary
- Site of Special Scientific Interest
- Location within Somerset
- Location of Seavington St. Mary.
- Area of search: Somerset
- Grid reference: ST400144
- Coordinates: 50.92592°N 2.85507°W
- Interest: Geological
- Area: 0.3 hectares (0.0030 km^{2}; 0.0012 sq mi)
- Notification date: 1971

Seavington St. Mary (grid reference ST400144) is a 0.3 hectare geological Site of Special Scientific Interest near the village of Seavington St Mary in Somerset, notified in 1971.

Extensive exposures through much of the Inferior Oolite. This is the most westerly outcrop of this formation in England. It is thus of considerable importance in interpreting the local stratigraphy and sedimentology in relation to the palaeogeography of south-west England in Middle Jurassic times. A valuable Aalenian - Bajocian locality affording a prime educational and research facility.

== Sources ==
- English Nature citation sheet for the site (accessed 10 August 2006)
