= Ben Knowle =

- Site of Special Scientific Interest
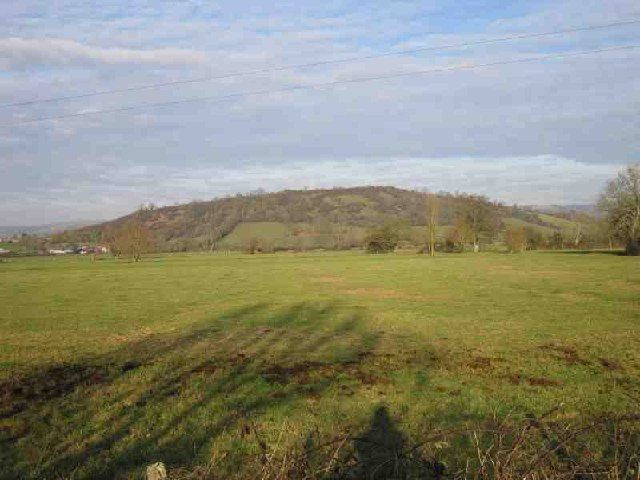

- Location within Somerset
- Location of Ben Knowle.
- Area of search: Somerset
- Grid reference: ST513450
- Coordinates: 51.20213°N 2.69843°W
- Interest: Geological
- Area: 1.5 hectares (0.015 km^{2}; 0.0058 sq mi)
- Notification date: 1984

Ben Knowle (grid reference ST513450) is a 1.5 hectare geological Site of Special Scientific Interest in Somerset, notified in 1984.

Ben Knowle is a natural outcrop of Celestine rising from the Somerset Levels where contacts with the host rock, Tea Green Marl, can be seen which illustrate the stratigraphic setting of the mineral deposit.
