= Holme Moor & Clean Moor =

- Site of Special Scientific Interest
- Location within Somerset
- Location of Holme Moor & Clean Moor.
- Area of search: Somerset
- Grid reference: ST095260
- Coordinates: 51.0261°N 3.2898°W
- Interest: Biological
- Area: 10.8 hectares (0.108 km^{2}; 0.042 sq mi)
- Notification date: 1987

Holme Moor & Clean Moor (grid reference ST095260) is a 10.8 hectare (26.7 acre) biological Site of Special Scientific Interest south of Wiveliscombe in Somerset, notified in 1987.

Holme Moor and Clean Moor support a range of habitats associated with high water tables. Swamp and calcareous flush plant communities with a very restricted distribution in Somerset are present. Further diversity is provided by areas of marshy grassland and broadleaved semi-natural woodland. An unusual feature of the ground flora is the abundance of Marsh-marigold (Caltha palustris).
