= Woolhayes Farm =

- Site of Special Scientific Interest
- Location within Somerset
- Location of Woolhayes Farm.
- Area of search: Somerset
- Grid reference: ST315109
- Coordinates: 50.89350°N 2.97533°W
- Interest: Biological
- Area: 13.2 hectares (0.132 km^{2}; 0.051 sq mi)
- Notification date: 1992

Woolhayes Farm (grid reference ST315109) is a 13.2 hectare (32.5 acre) biological Site of Special Scientific Interest east of Combe St Nicholas in Somerset, notified in 1992.

This site comprises swamp, mire and grassland habitats which are now rare in Britain. It is the largest known example of its type in Somerset and the communities present are near the western limit of their geographical range. The flora includes corky-fruited water-dropwort (Oenanthe pimpinelloides) which is a nationally scarce species. Breeding birds include grasshopper warbler (Locustella naevia) and reed bunting (Emberiza schoeniclus).
