= Axbridge Hill and Fry's Hill =

Site of Special Scientific Interest

- Site of Special Scientific Interest
- Location within Somerset
- Location of Axbridge Hill and Fry's Hill.
- Area of search: Somerset
- Grid reference: ST433555
- Coordinates: 51.29579°N 2.81459°W
- Interest: Biological
- Area: 64.8 ha (160 acres)
- Notification date: 1990

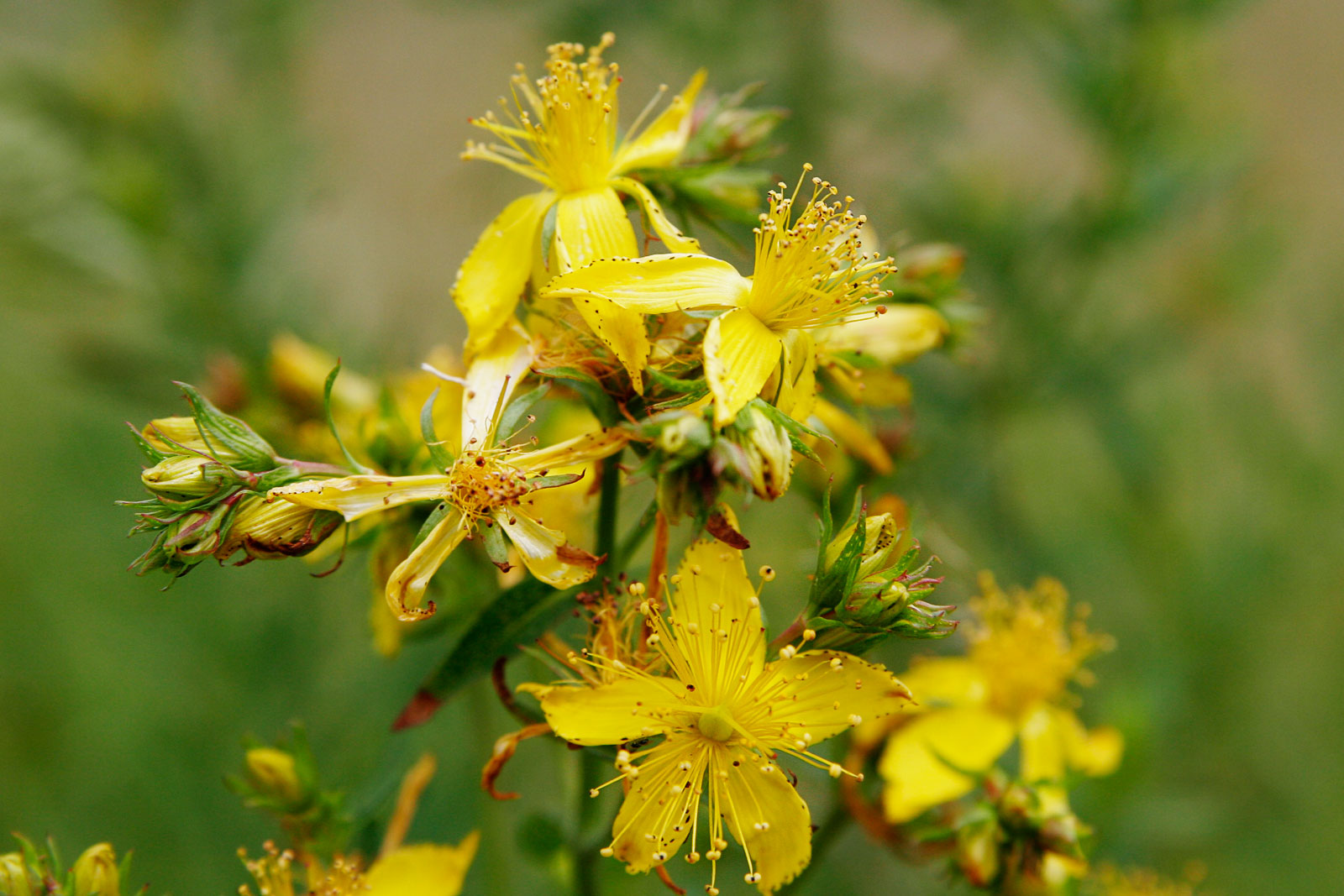
St John's wort

Axbridge Hill and Fry's Hill (grid reference ST433555) is a 64.8-hectare (160-acre) biological Site of Special Scientific Interest in the Mendip Hills, Somerset, notified in 1990. The hills are above the town of Axbridge, immediately to the east of Shute Shelve Hill.

This is a nationally important botanical site, for both vascular and non-vascular plants, situated on the southern escarpment of the Mendip Hills. It also contains a roosting site for two nationally rare species of bat and a wide range of butterfly species. The very thin soils here support populations of one nationally rare species, Cheddar bedstraw (Galium fleurotii) and four nationally scarce species, pale St John's wort (Hypericum montanum), sea storksbill (Erodium maritimum), dwarf mouse-ear (Cerastium pumilum) and spring cinquefoil (Potentilla tabernaemontani). There is a roosting site for greater horseshoe bat (Rhinolophus ferrumequinum) and lesser horseshoe bat R. hipposideros, both of which are nationally rare. Dormice (Muscardinus avellanarius) are found in the woodland. Twenty-five species of butterfly have been recorded and these include: brown argus (Aricia agestis), green hairstreak (Callophrys rubi), dark green fritillary (Argynnis aglaja) and marbled white (Melanargia galathea).
