= Friar's Oven =

Protected area in Somerset, England

- Site of Special Scientific Interest
- Location within Somerset
- Location of Friar's Oven.
- Area of search: Somerset
- Grid reference: ST592431
- Coordinates: 51.18566°N 2.58515°W
- Interest: Biological
- Area: 4.0 hectares (0.040 km^{2}; 0.015 sq mi)
- Notification date: 1989

Friar's Oven (grid reference ST592431) is a 4.0 hectare biological Site of Special Scientific Interest in Somerset, notified in 1989.

== Sources ==
- English Nature citation sheet for the site (accessed 9 August 2006)
