= Crook Peak to Shute Shelve Hill =

Geological and biological Site of Special Scientific Interest in Somerset, England

- Site of Special Scientific Interest
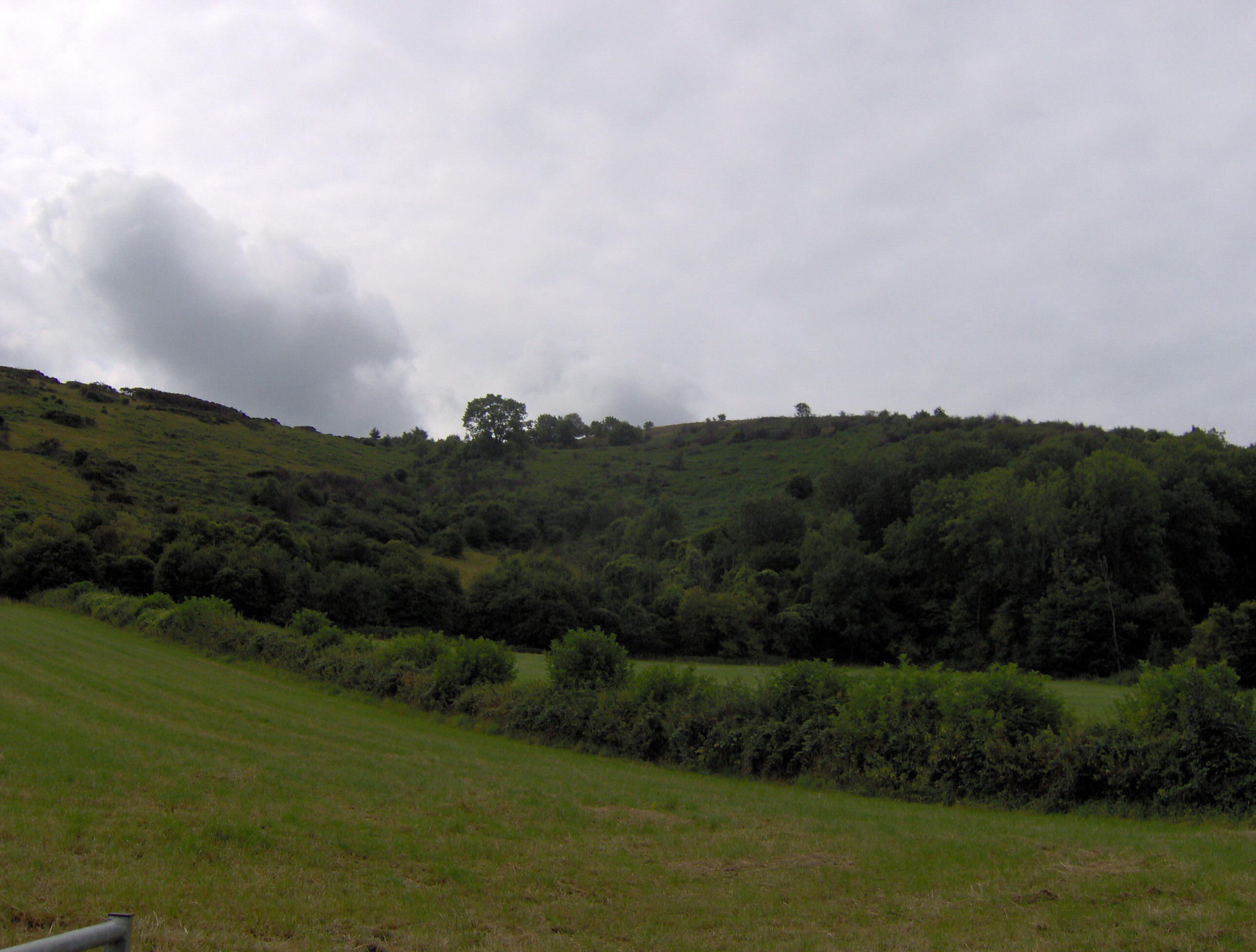

- Location within Somerset
- Location of Crook Peak to Shute Shelve Hill.
- Area of search: Somerset
- Grid reference: ST385555 to (grid reference ST430560)
- Coordinates: 51.2952°N 2.8814°W
- Interest: Biological and Geological
- Area: 332.2 hectares (3.322 km^{2}; 1.283 sq mi)
- Notification date: 1952

Crook Peak to Shute Shelve Hill is a 332.2 hectare (820.9 acre) geological and biological Site of Special Scientific Interest near the western end of the Mendip Hills, Somerset. The line of hills runs for approximately 5 kilometres (3.1 mi) from west to east and includes: Crook Peak, Compton Hill, Wavering Down, Cross Plain and Shute Shelve Hill. Most of the site is owned by the National Trust, which bought 725 acres (293 ha) in 1985, and much of it has been designated as common land. It was notified as an SSSI by Natural England in 1952.

The ecology of the area includes ancient woodland and calcareous grassland which supports nationally rare species including the Cheddar pink. The underlying rocks are Carboniferous Limestone containing phreatic caves at Shute Shelve Cavern and Picken's Hole from which fossils dating from the Middle Devensian have been recovered.

== Description ==
The site extends for some 5 kilometres (3.1 mi) from west to east. Near its eastern end it is divided by a gap used by the A38 road and the disused Cheddar Valley railway line. At the western end of the hills, closest to the M5 motorway, is Crook Peak which reaches 191 metres (627 ft), and forms a prominent feature from the surrounding landscape. Evidence of early human occupation of Crook Peak includes a polished flint axe. It was used as the site of a beacon at the time of the Spanish Armada. A ridge to the south east of Crook Peak, known as 'The Razor', is used by the West Mendip Soaring Association to fly model aircraft when the wind is a south-westerly, southerly or north-easterly direction.

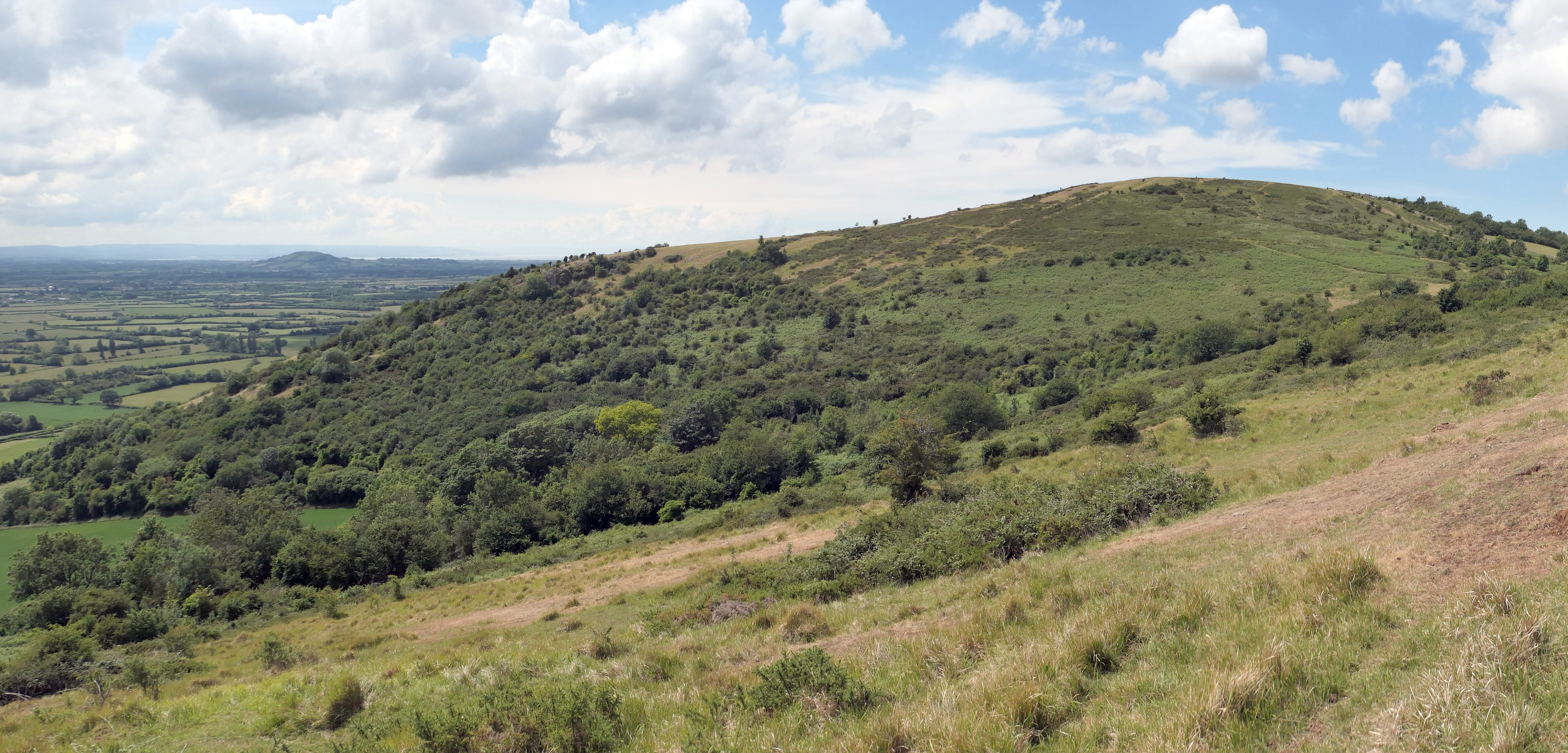
View of Wavering Down from Cross Plain.

Compton Hill is above the village of Compton Bishop. Also within the parish of Compton Bishop is Wavering Down which reaches a height of 210 metres (690 ft), and is marked with a triangulation station. Around the small village of Cross is Wavering Down House which was, for the last 20 years of his life, the home of the British comedian Frankie Howerd. The house is now a tourist attraction, and in the summer hosts concerts and opens regularly as a museum of Howerd's collection of memorabilia to raise fund for charities. Above the village itself is Cross Plain where there are earthworks remaining from enclosures. Further east is Shute Shelve Hill, east of the A38 road, reaching a height of 233 metres (764 ft), above the town of Axbridge and adjoining Axbridge Hill and Fry's Hill.

A long-distance footpath, the Mendip Way, follows much of the northern boundary of the site. There is also a 165 metres (541 ft) long tunnel which was part of the Cheddar Valley Line but is now used by pedestrians and cyclists. Within the tunnel the central surface has been paved with tarmac, but it is unlit except for a central guide line of small guide lamps. The north half of the tunnel is brick lined, but about midway it reverts to unlined rock for the southern half, marking a change in the underlying geology from sandstone to limestone.

== Etymology ==
Crook Peak has been important as a landmark and boundary from very early times, and the origins of the name are unclear. The local parish council state that 'Crook' comes from the Old English 'Cruc' meaning 'peak' or 'pointed hill'. 'Shute' is a contraction of schute which meant slope in the Middle Ages.

== Biological ==
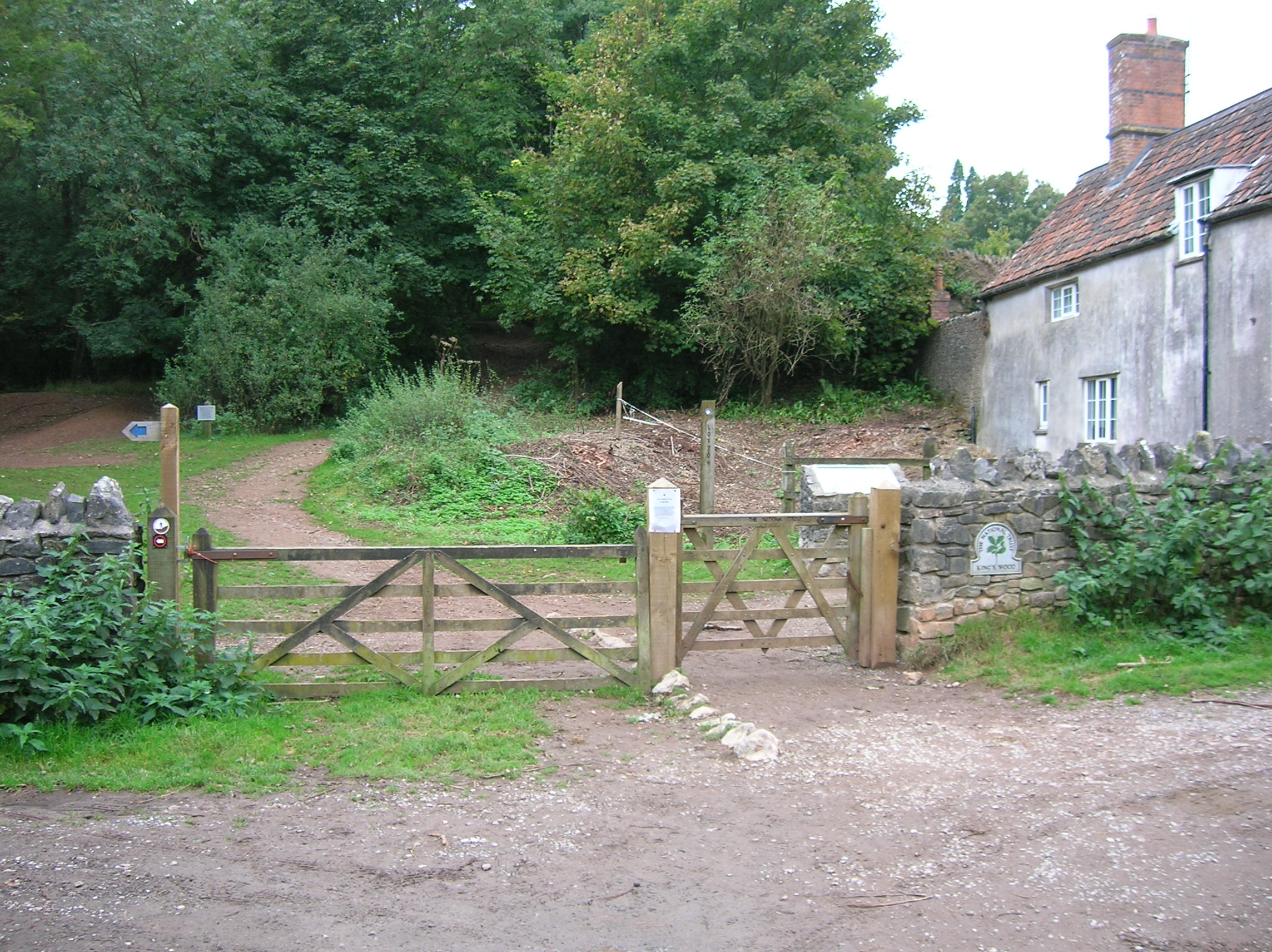
King's Wood between Cross Plain and Shute Shelve Hill

The ecology of the site is varied. There are ancient and secondary semi-natural broadleaved woodland; however, the majority is unimproved calcareous grassland with calcareous grassland and acidic dry dwarf-shrub heath. Four of the calcareous grassland communities and two of the woodland types have a restricted distribution in Britain, as does the calcareous grassland/acidic dry dwarf-shrub heath. These support species, four of which are considered nationally rare, while seven of the plant species present are considered notable. Plants of interest include the nationally rare Cheddar pink (Dianthus gratianopolitanus), bedstraw (Galium fleurotii), dwarf sedge (Carex humilis) and dwarf mouse-ear (Cerastium pumilum). Rose Wood and King's Wood are ancient woodland sites. King's Wood has coppiced hazel and nationally important small leaved lime. The nationally rare purple gromwell (Lithospermum purpurocaeruleum) occurs at Rose Wood.

== Geological ==
Shute Shelve Hill, is largely formed by more resistant Carboniferous Limestone laid down in the Dinantian period about 350 million years ago. The hill rises to 233 metres (764 ft) above sea levels and represents a ridge formed by the southern Limb of a highly eroded anticline with younger limestones on the lower slopes. Black Rock Limestone is exposed at several sites but is commonly covered by Burrington Oolite.

Picken's Hole at the southern end of Crook Peak is considered to be of importance because of its clear, well-stratified sequence of deposits and faunas, all dating from within the Devensian. The cave is 8 metres (26 ft) below the plateau and 27 metres (89 ft) above the valley floor. It is named after M.J. Picken who found teeth in earth thrown out of their sets in the area by badgers. A large number of Middle Palaeolithic artefacts, and two Neanderthal teeth dated to about 55,000 years BP, have been recovered from the cave. Faunal deposits of spotted hyena, lion, Arctic fox, mammoth, woolly rhinoceros, horse, reindeer, suslik and northern vole (Microtus oeconomus) from approximately 35,000 BP have also been recovered.

Shute Shelve Cavern is located on Shute Shelve Hill. It is a natural cave system which was mined for its yellow ochre, until the 1920s. The phreatic cave contains fossils of speleothems over 350,000 years old.

== Barton Camp ==
Barton Camp, which is on the northern slopes of Crook Peak, is run by the Bristol Children's Help Society, which was founded in 1884 to help needy children. The centre provided residential activity courses. The facilities include classrooms, a sports hall, outdoor pool, playing field and bunkhouse accommodation.
