= Viaduct Quarry =

Geological Site of Special Scientific Interest in Somerset, England

- Site of Special Scientific Interest
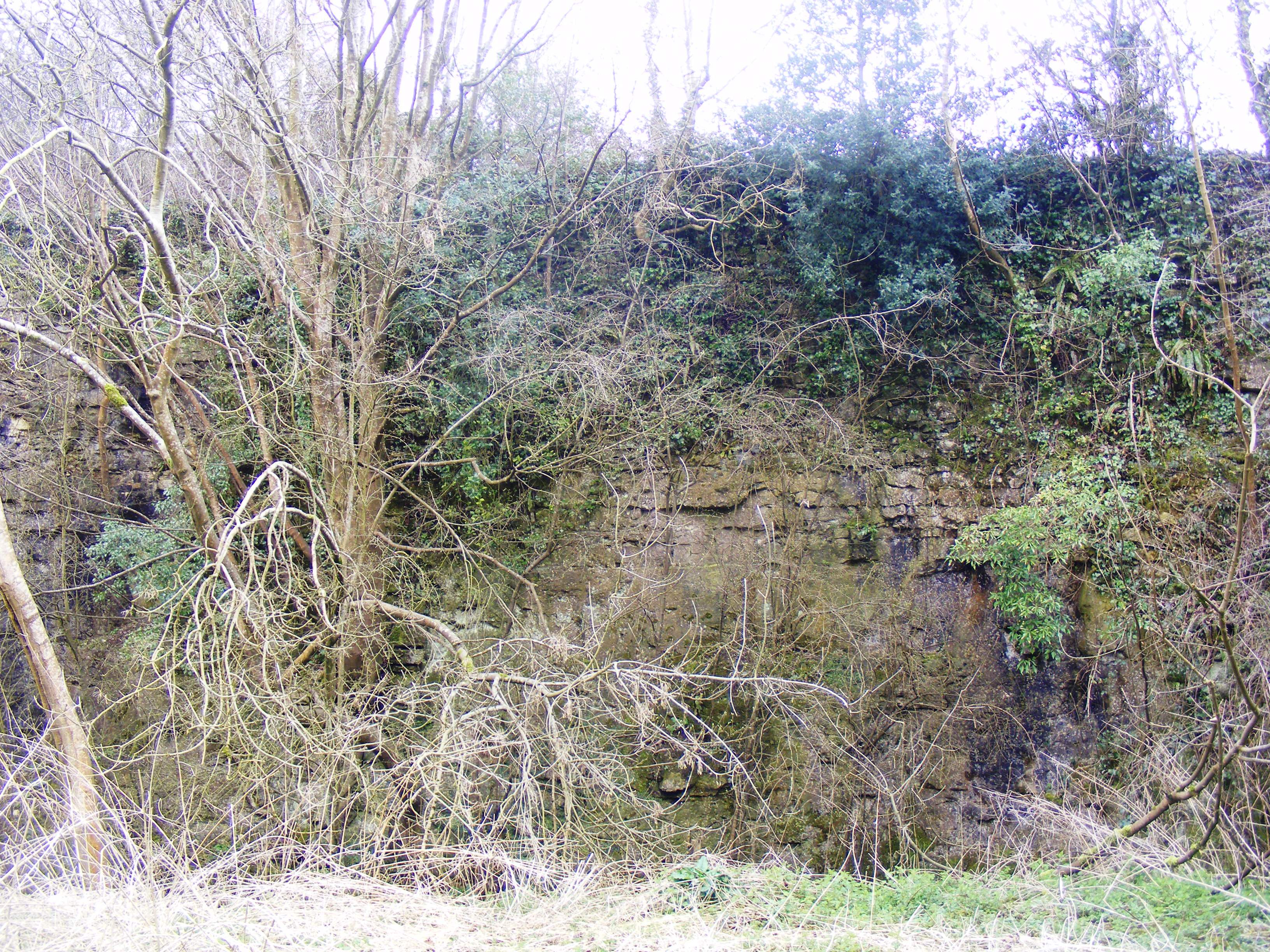

- Location within Somerset
- Location of Viaduct Quarry.
- Area of search: Somerset
- Grid reference: ST621443
- Coordinates: 51.19665°N 2.54378°W
- Interest: Geological
- Area: 0.3 hectares (0.0030 km^{2}; 0.0012 sq mi)
- Notification date: 1984

Viaduct Quarry (grid reference ST621443) is a 0.3 hectare geological Site of Special Scientific Interest near Shepton Mallet on the Mendip Hills in Somerset, notified in 1984.

This disused quarry is a Geological Conservation Review site identified as the best exposed and thickest section in the Downside Stone, a localised limestone development which accumulated adjacent to the Lower Jurassic Mendip Island.

== See also ==
- Quarries of the Mendip Hills

== Sources ==
- English Nature citation sheet for the site (accessed 9 August 2006)
