= Sparkford Wood =

Protected area in Somerset, England

- Site of Special Scientific Interest
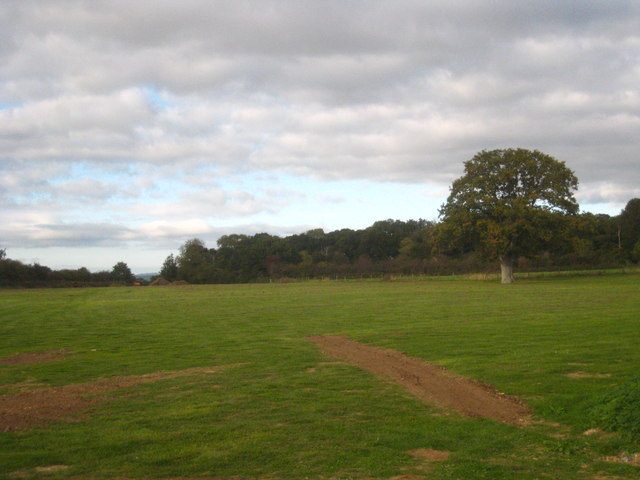

- Location within Somerset
- Location of Sparkford Wood.
- Area of search: Somerset
- Grid reference: ST613275
- Coordinates: 51.04554°N 2.55342°W
- Interest: Biological
- Area: 8.4 hectares (0.084 km^{2}; 0.032 sq mi)
- Notification date: 1954

Sparkford Wood (grid reference ST613275) is an 8.4 hectare (20.7 acre) biological Site of Special Scientific Interest at Sparkford in Somerset, notified in 1954.

Sparkford Wood is a broadleaved semi-natural woodland situated on heavy fertile soils. It dates from at least the 18th Century and its survival amongst the prime agricultural land of south-east Somerset makes it unique. The ground flora, which includes abundant Bluebell (Hyacinthoides non-scriptus), varies in conjunction with differences in soils which range from mildly calcareous to acid. The woodland has a large population of homostyle Primroses (Primula vulgaris) which have been the subject of some classic genetic studies. These plants are unique in that they represent a self-fertile form of a normally self-sterile species, and they are of international significance in providing research opportunities.
