= Sandpit Hole and Bishop's Lot =

Geological Site of Special Scientific Interest in Somerset, England

- Site of Special Scientific Interest
- Location within Somerset
- Location of Sandpit Hole and Bishop's Lot.
- Area of search: Somerset
- Grid reference: ST531498
- Coordinates: 51.24543°N 2.67330°W
- Interest: Geological
- Area: 1.8 hectares (0.018 km^{2}; 0.0069 sq mi)
- Notification date: 1987

Sandpit Hole and Bishop's Lot (grid reference ST531498) is a 1.8 hectare geological Site of Special Scientific Interest near Ebbor Gorge in Somerset, notified in 1987.

This site consists of two of the largest isolated depressions, known as dolines, occurring in the Mendip limestone area, and both appear to have been formed by the limestones being dissolved by subterranean waters and the overlying rocks then collapsing into them.

== Sources ==
- English Nature citation sheet for the site (accessed 10 August 2006)
