= Grove Farm, Ealing =

Nature reserve in London, England

Coordinates: 51.554°N 0.341°W

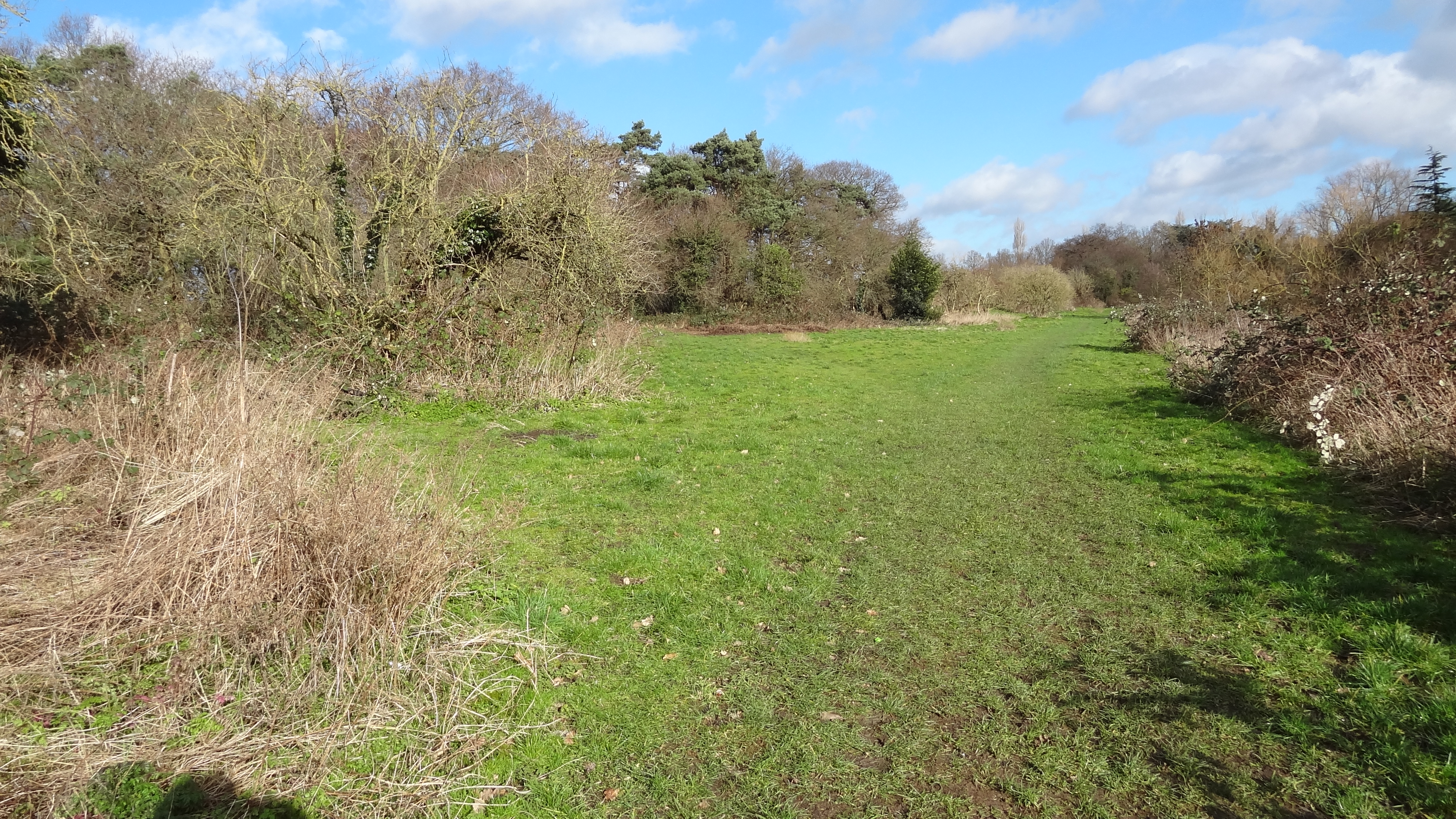
Grove Farm

Grove Farm is an 8-hectare Local Nature Reserve (LNR) in Greenford in the London Borough of Ealing. It was declared an LNR in 2002 by Ealing Council, which owns and manages the site.

The site has ancient woodland, and woodland flower species, while trees include the wild service tree. Plant species include welted thistle, hairy violet, pepper saxifrage and adders tongue fern.

There is a circular path, and there is access from Whitton Avenue West, Dimmock Drive and Lilian Board Way.
