= Grove Farm, Somerset =

Grove Farm
- Site of Special Scientific Interest
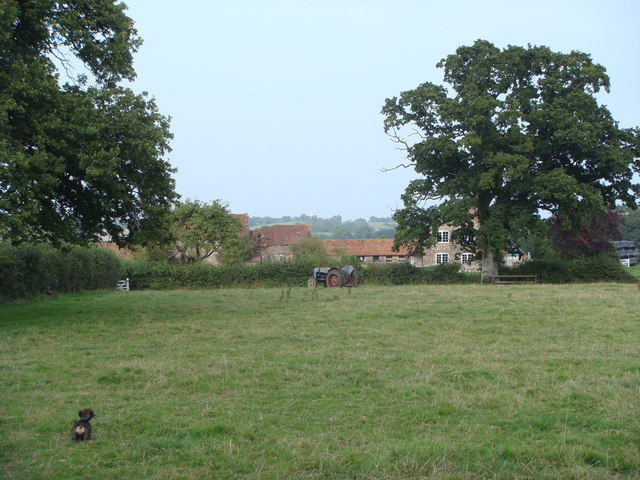

- Location within Somerset
- Location of Grove Farm.
- Area of search: Somerset
- Grid reference: ST513096
- Coordinates: 50.88383°N 2.69366°W
- Interest: Biological
- Area: 36.5 hectares (0.365 km^{2}; 0.141 sq mi)
- Notification date: 1989

Grove Farm (grid reference ST513096) is a 36.5 hectare (90.2 acre) biological Site of Special Scientific Interest in Somerset, notified in 1989.

This site comprises an extensive area of unimproved mesotrophic grassland, a habitat which is now uncommon in Britain.
