= Cogley Wood =

Protected area in Somerset, England

- Site of Special Scientific Interest
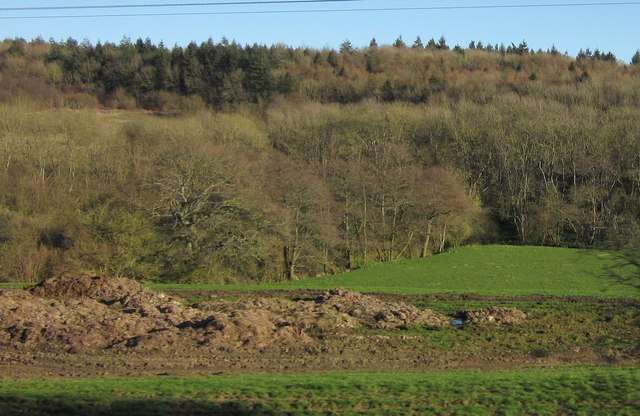

- Location within Somerset
- Location of Cogley Wood.
- Area of search: Somerset
- Grid reference: ST703345
- Coordinates: 51.10902°N 2.42562°W
- Interest: Biological
- Area: 60.7 hectares (0.607 km^{2}; 0.234 sq mi)
- Notification date: 1987

Cogley Wood (grid reference ST703345) is a 60.7 hectare biological Site of Special Scientific Interest east of Bruton in Somerset, notified in 1987.

The name is believed to be from cock ley meaning a clearing with birds.

The wood is situated on the eastern slopes of the upper reaches of the Brue valley, with several of its tributaries having their sources in the wood which is made up of two extensive areas of species-rich, semi-natural ancient woodland with an exceptionally rich butterfly fauna.

The trees include ash (Fraxinus excelsior), pedunculate oak (Quercus robur), wych elm (Ulmus glabra) and wild cherry (Prunus avium). Beneath them are dog's mercury (Mercurialis perennis) and common bluebell (Hyacinthoides non-scripta). Other plants of interest include greater butterfly-orchid (Platanthera chlorantha) and meadow saffron (Colchicum autumnale).

36 species of resident breeding butterflies have been recorded including marsh fritillary (Euphydryas aurinia), high brown fritillary (Argynnis cydippe), brown hairstreak (Thecla betulae), Duke of Burgundy (Hamearis lucina) and purple emperor (Apatura iris).
