= Hobbs Quarry SSSI, Shepton Mallet =

Geological Site of Special Scientific Interest in Somerset, England

Hobbs Quarry
- Site of Special Scientific Interest
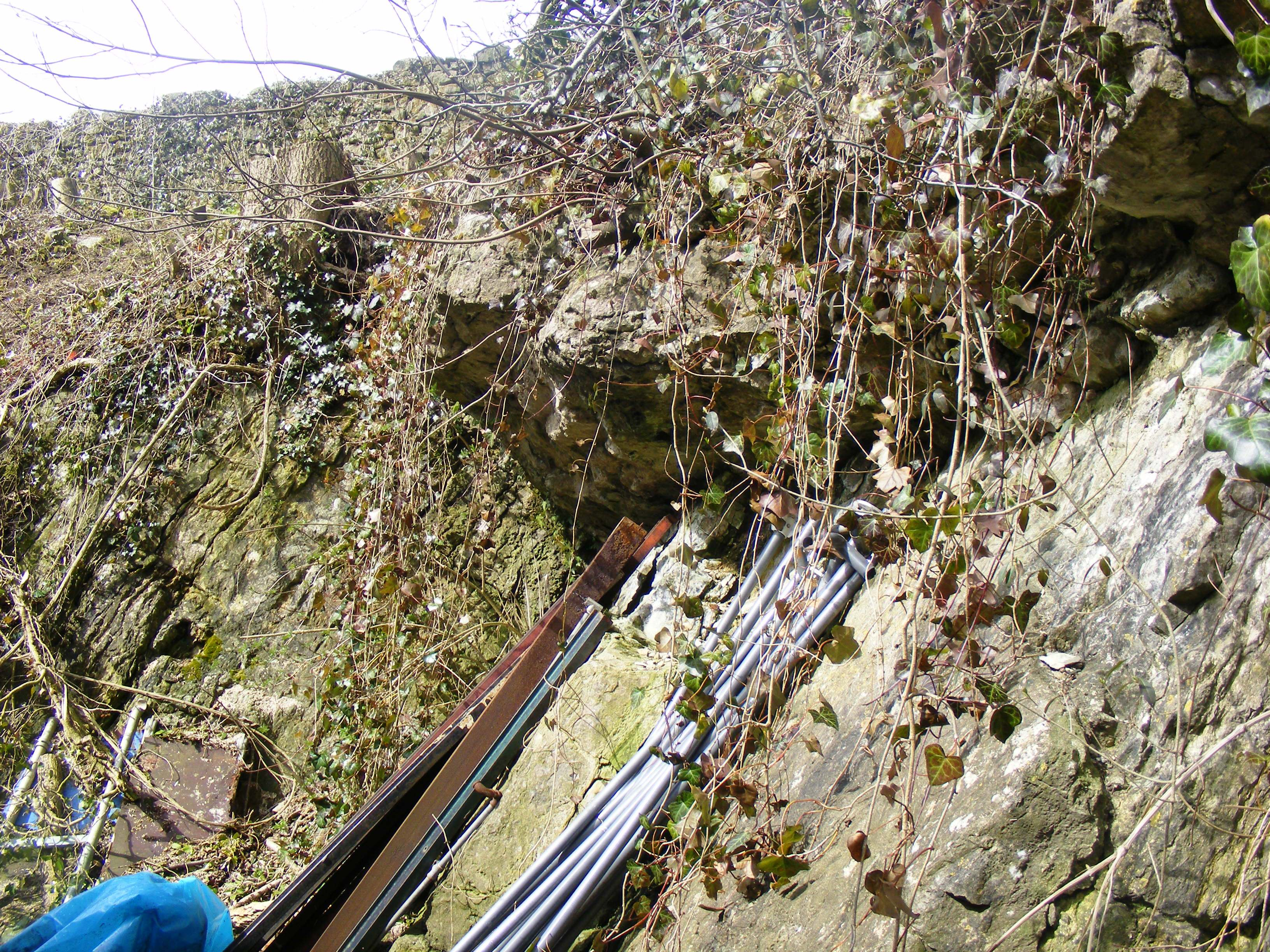

- Location within Somerset
- Location of Hobbs Quarry.
- Area of search: Somerset
- Grid reference: ST622446
- Coordinates: 51.19936°N 2.54238°W
- Interest: Geological
- Area: 0.5 hectares (0.0050 km^{2}; 0.0019 sq mi)
- Notification date: 1984

Hobbs Quarry (grid reference ST622446) is a 0.5 hectare geological Site of Special Scientific Interest near Shepton Mallet on the Mendip Hills in Somerset, notified in 1984.

This disused quarry, which now forms the back of a builders merchants yard, is a Geological Conservation Review Site which demonstrates early Jurassic transgression, with steeply-dipping Carboniferous Limestone being overlain by flatter-lying massive limestones (of early Jurassic age) known as the Downside Stone.

== See also ==
- Quarries of the Mendip Hills

== Sources ==
- English Nature citation sheet for the site (accessed 22 July 2006).
