= Churchstanton =

Village and civil parish in Somerset, England

Coordinates: 50.924°N 3.145°W

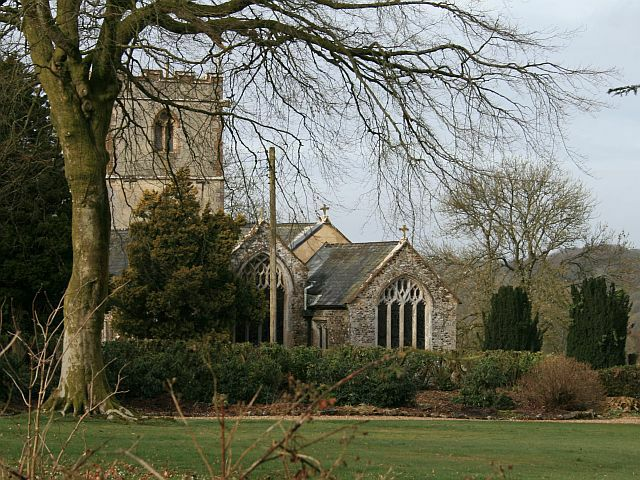
- Church of St Peter & St Paul, Churchstanton

- Location within Somerset
- Population: 889 (2021)
- OS grid reference: ST195145
- Unitary authority: Somerset Council
- Ceremonial county: Somerset
- Region: South West
- Country: England
- Sovereign state: United Kingdom
- Post town: TAUNTON
- Postcode district: TA3
- Dialling code: 01823
- Police: Avon and Somerset
- Fire: Devon and Somerset
- Ambulance: South Western
- UK Parliament: Taunton and Wellington
- Website: Parish Council

Churchstanton is a village and civil parish in Somerset, England, lying within the Blackdown Hills Area of Outstanding Natural Beauty, on the River Otter 5 miles (8.0 km) south of Taunton. The parish had a population of 889 at the 2021 census, and includes the hamlets of Churchinford, Burnworthy, Stapley and Willand.

== History ==
The village was known as Cheristone, meaning stony settlement where cherries grow, in the 13th century.

Burnworthy Lodge dates from the 16th century and is a Grade II listed building.

Until 1896, the village was within Hemyock Hundred in the county of Devon. It was then transferred into Somerset.

== Governance ==
The parish council has responsibility for local issues, including setting an annual precept (local rate) to cover the council's operating costs and producing annual accounts for public scrutiny. The parish council evaluates local planning applications and works with the local police, district council officers, and neighbourhood watch groups on matters of crime, security, and traffic. The parish council's role also includes initiating projects for the maintenance and repair of parish facilities, as well as consulting with the district council on the maintenance, repair, and improvement of highways, drainage, footpaths, public transport, and street cleaning. Conservation matters (including trees and listed buildings) and environmental issues are also the responsibility of the council.

For local government purposes, since 1 April 2023, the village comes under the unitary authority of Somerset Council. Prior to this, it was part of the non-metropolitan district of Somerset West and Taunton (formed on 1 April 2019) and, before this, the district of Taunton Deane (established under the Local Government Act 1972). From 1894 to 1974, for local government purposes, Churchstanton was part of Taunton Rural District.

Churchstanton is part of the Taunton and Wellington county constituency, represented in the House of Commons of the Parliament of the United Kingdom. It elects one Member of Parliament (MP) by the first past the post system of election, and was part of the South West England constituency of the European Parliament prior to Britain leaving the European Union in January 2020, which elected seven MEPs using the d'Hondt method of party-list proportional representation.

State Education for the children of the village up to aged 11 is provided by Somerset County Council's Churchstanton Primary School, at Willand. State secondary education is provided at The Castle School in Taunton or at Uffculme School in Devon.

== Amenities ==
The people of the parish and adjoining area own and manage a Community Shop. In addition to selling local produce, it has a Post office counter service, alcohol licence and a coffee shop. There is a public open space on the edge of the village which is managed by a group of volunteers. The area provides recreational facilities for residents to play field games, walk, picnic and have an allotment. There is a Village Hall, again run by volunteers. The hall is used for community events and meetings as well as being available to rent for private events and entertainment. Periodically films are shown and there is a monthly produce market.

== Geography ==
Quants Reserve is a nature reserve north west of the village which consists of a grassland clearing in a forestry plantation. It is well known for its butterflies — among the species which occur are Duke of Burgundy, marsh fritillary and wood white. In 1988 an area of 50.6 hectares (126.0 acres) was designated as a Biological Site of Special Scientific Interest.

Ringdown is a biological Site of Special Scientific Interest where outcrops of both Cretaceous Upper Greensand and underlying Triassic Keuper Marls occur. Amongst the vegetation present are two species which are very restricted in South West Britain, white beaksedge (Rhynchospora alba) and dioecious sedge (Carex dioica). This site is the only known location for the latter in Somerset. A colony of the small pearl-bordered fritillary (Boloria selene) is found here.

To the east of Churchinford village lies a local nature reserve set around two lakes of the former landscaped gardens of Otterhead House, which was demolished in 1952. The estate was developed in Victorian times and by 1890 included over 1700 acres of land. The reserve was designated as a LNR in 2008. It is managed and leased from Wessex Water by the not-for-profit Otterhead Estate Trust Co Ltd. The company was set up in 2008 to conserve and part restore the built heritage features on site, as well as continuing the work of the Somerset Wildlife Trust who used to manage the reserve. The main feature of the LNR is the valley of the River Otter, in which the former Victorian estate had created a flight of five lakes and a complicated system of leats, weirs and pumps. Today only two of the lakes survive.

A range of semi-natural habitats make up the reserve including alder and willow carr, dry deciduous woodland, unimproved neutral grassland, and freshwater streams and ditches. Dormice, badgers and bat species occur in the woodland. The lakes support bird species including kingfisher, dipper and wagtail.

== Religious sites ==
The parish Church of St Peter and St Paul dates from the 14th century and has been designated as a Grade I listed building.
