= Dioecious sedge =

Dioecious sedge is a common name for several plants and may refer to:

- Carex dioica, native to Europe and western Siberia
- Carex sterilis, native to North America
