= Bishopswood (disambiguation) =

Bishopswood, Bishops Wood, or Bishop's Wood may refer to:

- Bishops Wood, village in Staffordshire, England
- Bishop's Wood, nature reserve in the Gower Peninsula, Wales
- Bishopswood, hamlet in the parish of Walford, Ross-on-Wye, Herefordshire
- Bishop's Wood, woodland north-west of Eccleshall, Staffordshire, England
- Bishopswood School, school in Oxfordshire, England
- Bishopswood Meadows, nature reserve in Somerset, England
