= Somerset Wildlife Trust =

Conservation charity in Somerset, England

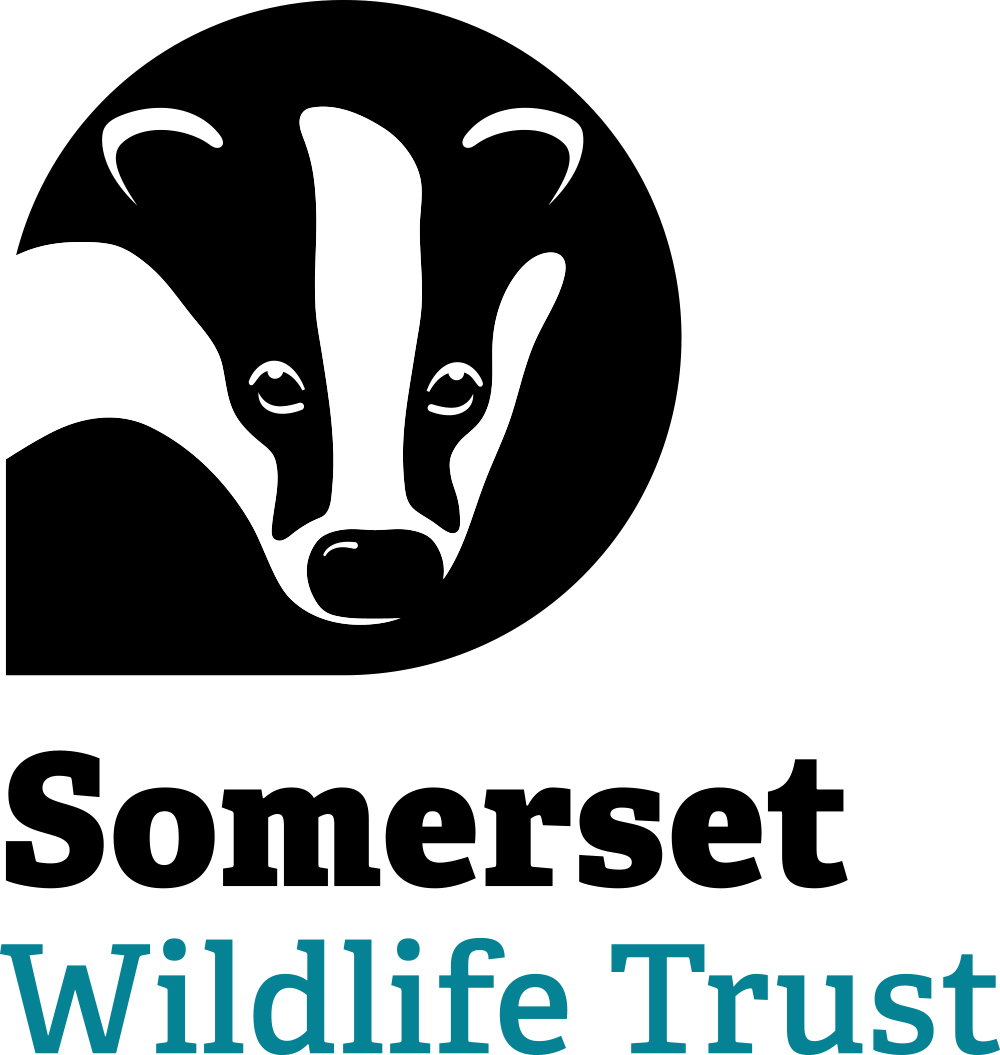
- Trust Logo
- Type: Registered Charity
- Headquarters: Taunton, Somerset
- Official language: English
- Parent organization: Wildlife Trusts partnership
- Website: Somerset Wildlife Trust

Somerset Wildlife Trust (SWT) is a wildlife trust covering the county of Somerset, England.

The trust, which was established in 1964, aims to safeguard the county's wildlife and wild places for this and future generations and manages almost 80 nature reserves. Examples include Westhay Moor, Long Wood and Langford Heathfield. It has over 20,500 members and 500 volunteers.

The Somerset Wildlife Trust is part of the Wildlife Trusts partnership of 46 wildlife trusts in the United Kingdom.

In 2010 the organisation won a Biffa Award for their "Restoring Habitat for Dormice in Somerset" scheme.

In 2011 the Trust appealed for £100,000 from local residents and businesses to restore former peat diggings on the Somerset Levels.

== Nature reserves ==
The Nature reserves include: (* = Reserves designated as Sites of Scientific Interest)

- Aller and Beer Woods*
- Aisholt Wood
- Babcary Meadows*
- Bickham Wood
- Bishopswood Meadows
- Black Rock*
- Boon's Copse
- Brimley Hill Mire
- Bubwith Acres*
- Burtle Moor*
- Catcott Reserve*
- Chancellor's Farm*
- Cheddar Wood*
- Cheddar Wood Edge
- Cockles Fields
- Cook's Fields
- Dommett Wood
- Draycott Sleights*
- Dundon Beacon
- Edford Woods and Meadows*
- Fivehead Arable Fields*
- GB Gruffy*
- Gilling Down*
- Great Breach and Copley Woods*
- Green Down*
- Greylynch
- Harridge Wood
- Holford Kelting*
- Hollow Marsh Meadow*
- Honeygar (a rewilding project)
- Horsehill Coppice
- Huish Moor
- Jan Hobbs
- King's Castle Wood|
- Kings Hill Gully
- Langford Heathfield*
- Long Wood*
- Lots Grassland
- Lynchcombe
- Mascall's Wood
- Middledown
- Mounsey Wood*
- New Hill & Tannager*
- Payton Marsh
- Perry Mead
- Prospect Fields*
- Quants*
- Rewe Mead
- Ringdown
- Ruggin*|
- Sharpham Moor Plot*
- South Hill
- Street Heath*
- Sutton's Pond
- Tealham Moor*
- Thurlbear Wood*
- Tor Hole Fields
- Ubley Warren*
- Velvet Bottom
- Wellington Castle Fields
- West Coker Fen
- Westhay Heath*
- Westhay Moor* (National Nature Reserve)
- Withial Combe
- Yarley Fields
- Yarty Moor*
- Yoxter Range

== See also ==
- List of Sites of Special Scientific Interest in Somerset
