= Yoxter Cadet Training Camp =

Yoxter Training Camp
- Mendip Hills, Somerset, England
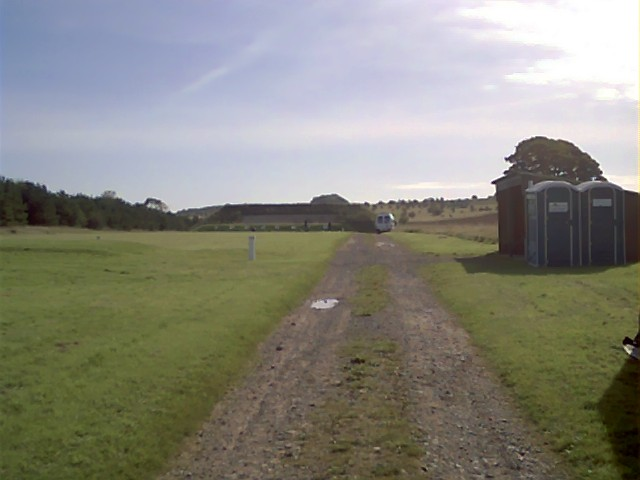
- Yoxter Range

Site information
- Type: Training Camp
- Owner: Wessex Reserve Forces' and Cadets' Association
- Operator: British Army
- Open to the public: No

Location
- Shown within Somerset
- Coordinates: 51.2842°N 2.7002°W

Site history
- Built: 1934
- Built for: War Office
- In use: 1934-Present

Yoxter Cadet Training Camp is a cadet training area and camp owned by the Wessex Reserve Forces and Cadets' Association and situated on the Mendip Hills in Somerset. It is between the villages of Charterhouse and Priddy. It is adjacent to the Chancellor's Farm biological Site of Special Scientific Interest, and the Somerset Wildlife Trust, Wessex RFCA, Ministry of Defence, and Natural England work together to enable conservation grazing on the site.

== History ==
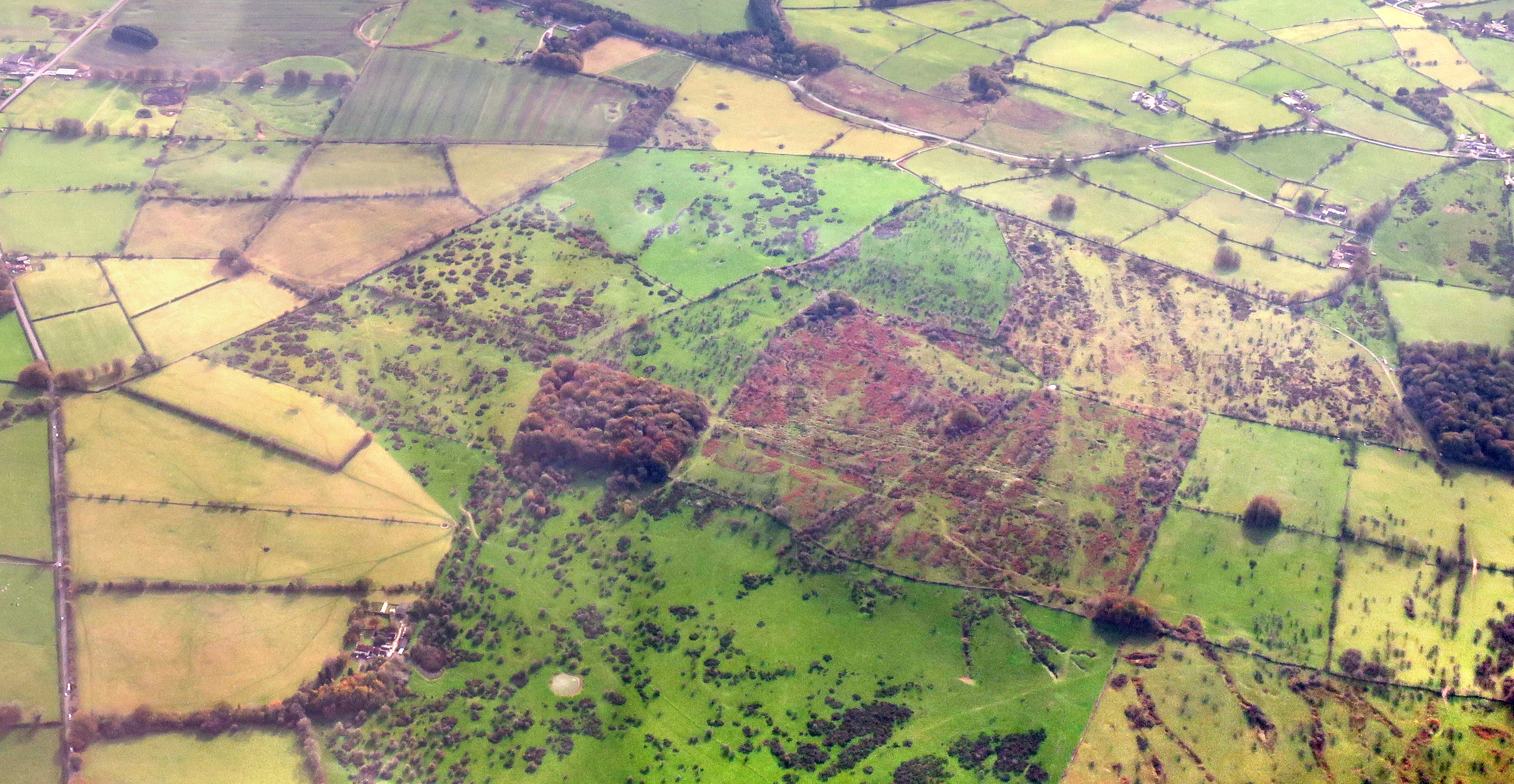
Aerial view of Yoxter training camp.

The camp was purchased from non-public funds in 1934 to provide a training facility for the Territorial Army (now the Army Reserve). It was used for Regular Army training in the run-up and during the Second World War, and afterward, the camp reverted to the TA. In 1964 the Royal Anglian Regiment renovated the camp and it has been in use by the Army Cadet Force ever since.

== Facilities ==
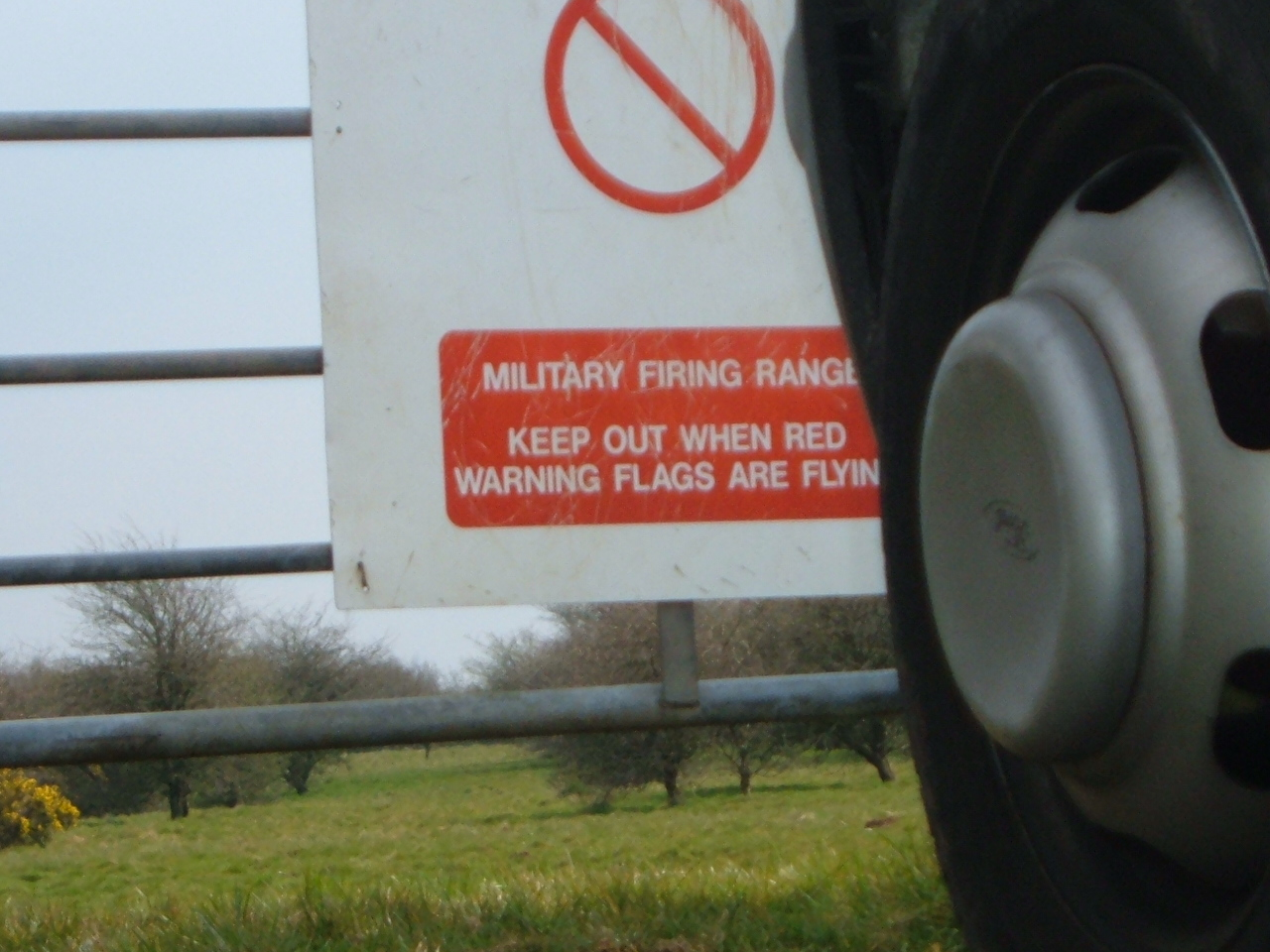
Warning sign on the gate leading from Haydon Grange Farm to the Yoxter training area

The training area has 885 acres (3.58 km^{2}) of land. It has a 600 yards (550 m), 8 lane, rifle range. When firing is not in progress the training area is also used for fieldcraft exercises as well as helicopter training and the driving of non-tracked vehicles. The camp has billet accommodation for 100, store rooms, a kitchen, classrooms, and toilet facilities. All accommodation was refurbished or rebuilt in 2012/13.
