= Harridge Wood =

Woodland in Somerset, England

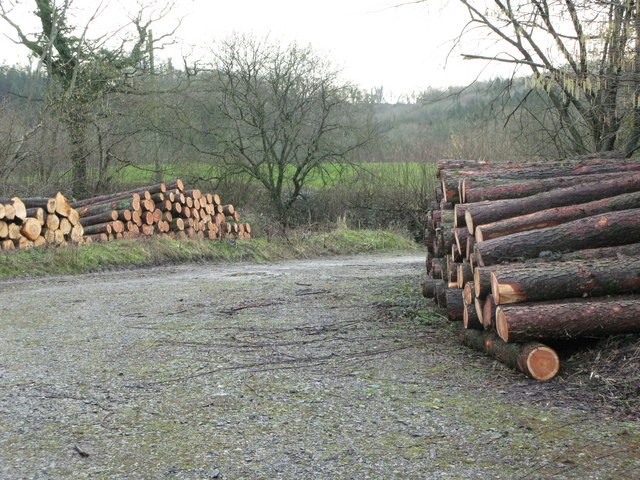
- Logs waiting collection near the entrance to the nature reserve

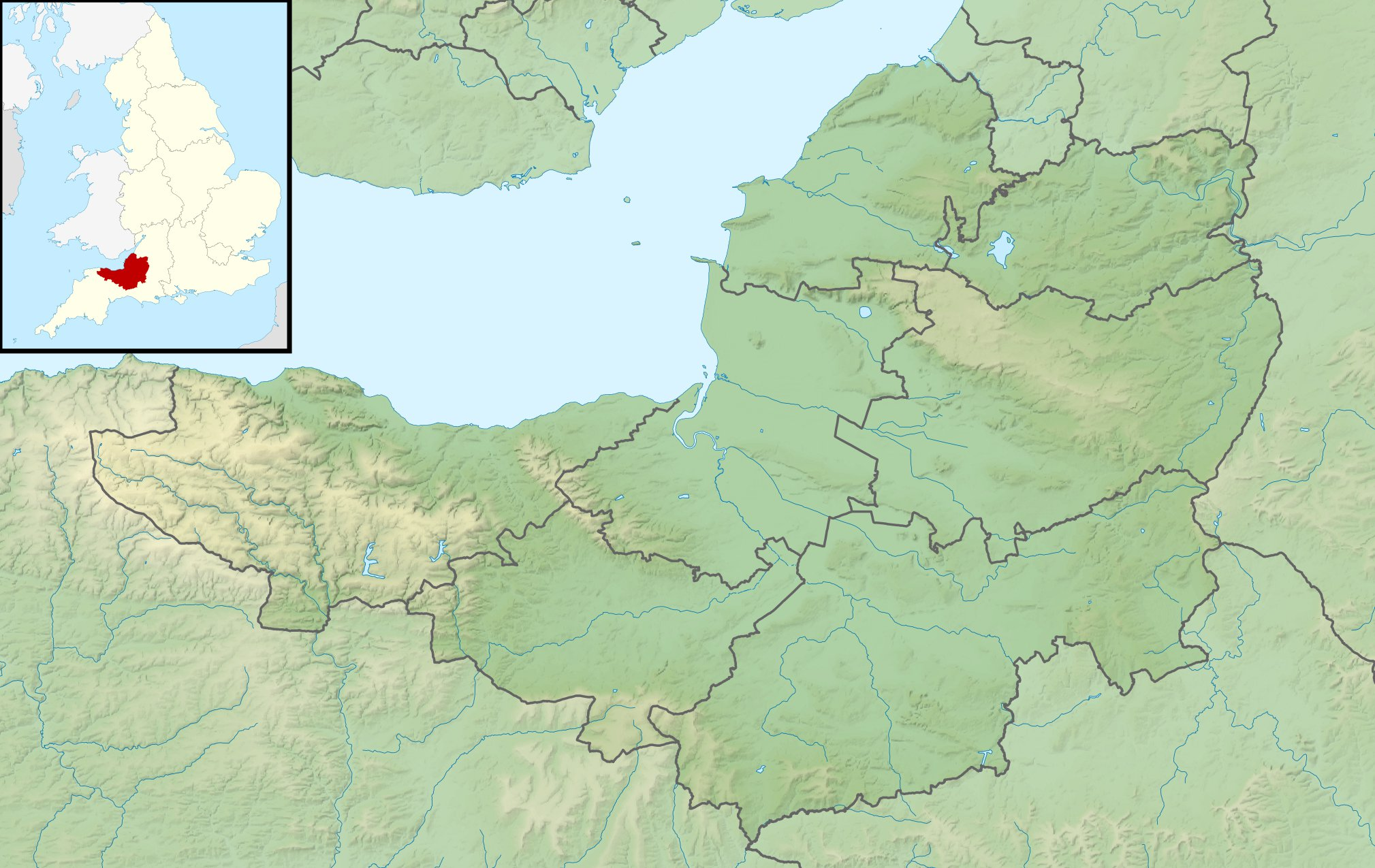
- Location within Somerset
- Nearest city: Radstock, Somerset, England
- Coordinates: 51.231604°N 2.501780°W
- Area: 55 hectares (140 acres)
- Designation: Nature reserve
- Administrator: Somerset Wildlife Trust

Harridge Wood is an area of woodland in Somerset, England. From about 1300 AD part of the wood was the scene of coal mining, which continued until around 1800. The traces of mining have been well preserved, and are now a scheduled site. The woodland is now part of the Harridge Woods Nature Reserve. Large areas were planted for timber in the mid-20th century, and this continues to be harvested. The nature reserve is steadily reintroducing the original flora.

== Environment ==
The Harridge Wood mainly lies on clay slopes dissected by streams. It is thought to be very old, although large areas of the original broadleaf coverage was cleared in the mid-20th century and replaced by poplars and conifers. Remnants of the early forest are found in isolated patches, on the edge of the woodland and in wet areas. These include areas of old hazel coppice and low pollards (known as "stoggles") of ash, pedunculate oak and alder. There are diverse woodland flora in the less disturbed areas, including ferns in the wetter parts and woodland herbs in the dryer areas. In some places there are cow pastures beside the woods, which attract foraging bats, while other bats forage along the woods and streams.

== Mine workings ==
In Harridge Wood and Edford Wood the coal seams outcrop at the surface and there are many remains of pre-18th century mining. The medieval and post-medieval coal mining remains in Harridge Wood and Edford Wood South were made a 16 hectares (40 acres) scheduled site under the Ancient Monuments and Archaeological Areas Act 1979 as of 17 May 2000. The site includes Edford Wood South, all of Harridge Wood East and part of Harridge Wood West. The site covers parts of the parishes of Ashwick, Stoke St Michael and Stratton-on-the-Fosse in the Mendip district of Somerset. The coal mining workings are examples of medieval and post-medieval coal mining that have been very well preserved by being incorporated in the woodland. They show a variety of mining methods employed before the 19th century.

In the early days miners excavated the coal using bell pits, where they dug a shaft down to the coal, then excavated as wide an area round the foot of the shaft as was safe, giving it a bell shape. They then moved to a nearby location and repeated the process, spacing the shafts close enough to minimise wastage. 52 bell pits have been found in Harridge Wood East, the largest with a diameter of 25 metres (82 ft). Adits have also been found, horizontal passages for accessing the mines or draining waters, and leats that carried water to power machinery or drained water. There are mounds of excavated material and the remains of shafts. The coal field was active from around 1300 to 1800, although some small working continued longer.

== Nature reserve ==
=== Location ===
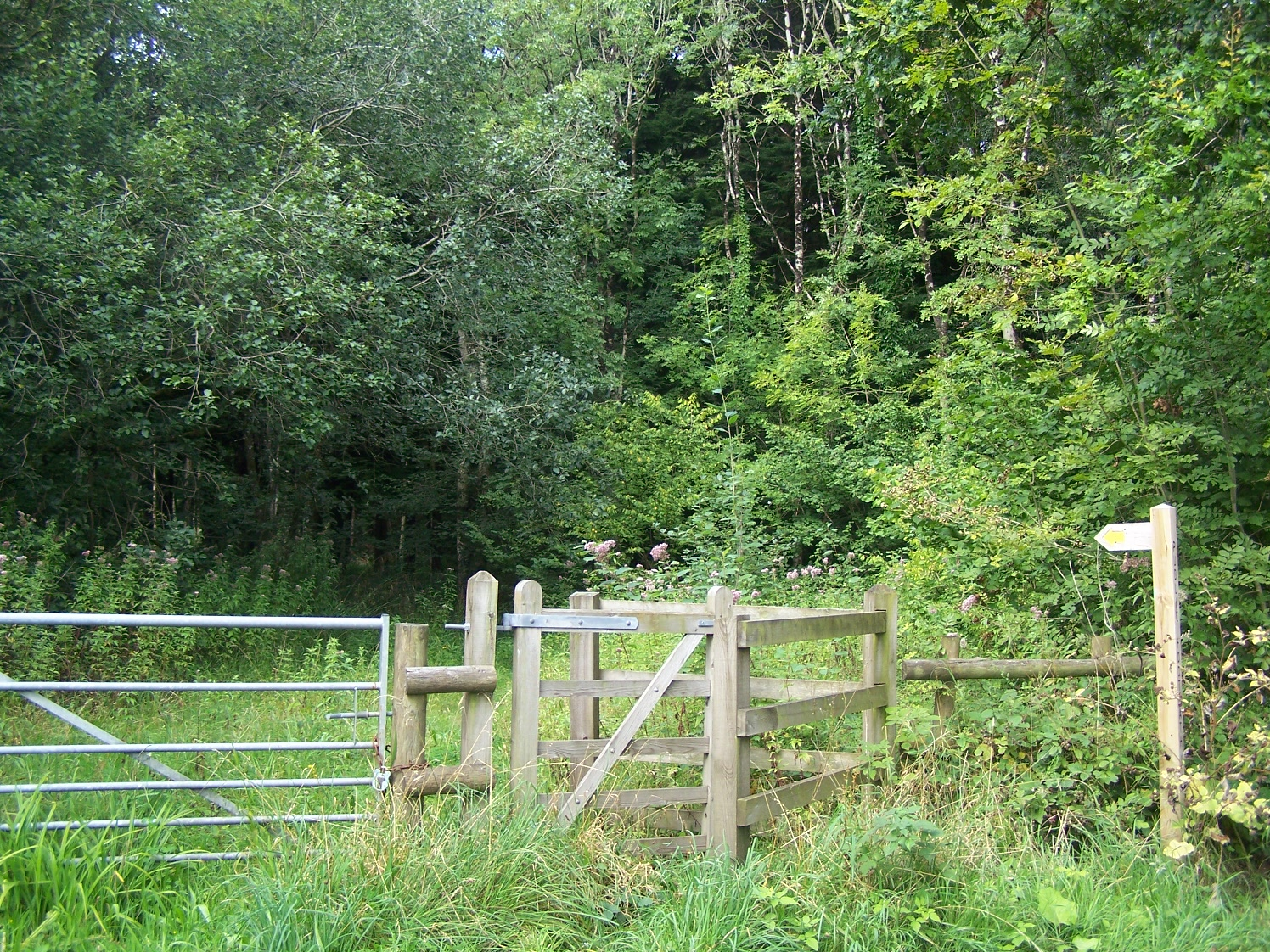
Path through Harridge Wood

The 55 hectares (140 acres) Harridge Woods nature reserve is owned and operated by Somerset Wildlife Trust. The nature reserve includes five sites: Home Wood, Limekiln Wood, Harridge Woods West, Harrdidge Woods East and Edford Woods South. There are two nature trails with stops where points of interest are described. The Mells River runs through the western part of the reserve. The woods are a managed woodland, and lumber is extracted. The Cerberus Spelæological Society controls all cave and archaeological related activity in the reserve.

=== Flora ===
Trees include various species of alder, ash (Fraxinus excelsior), hazel (Corylus avellana), Norway Spruce (Picea abies), pedunculate oak (Quercus robur), silver birch (Betula pendula), spindle (Euonymus europaeus) and wych elm (Ulmus glabra). Fungi include fly agaric (Amanita muscaria), King Alfred's cake (Daldinia concentrica) and scarlet elf cup (Sarcoscypha coccinea). Other plant species include bluebell (Hyacinthoides non-scripta), enchanter's nightshade (Circaea lutetiana), hart's tongue fern (Asplenium scolopendrium), lesser celandine (Ficaria verna), meadow saffron (Colchicum autumnale), nettle-leaved bellflower (Campanula trachelium), Solomon's seal (Polygonatum multiflorum), toothwort (Lathraea squamaria), wild garlic (Allium ursinum), wood anemone (Anemone nemorosa) and yellow archangel (Lamium galeobdolon).

=== Fauna ===
A dilapidated cottage has been restored as a bat house. Bats include brown long-eared bat (Plecotus auritus), greater horseshoe bat (Rhinolophus ferrumequinum) and lesser horseshoe bat (Rhinolophus hipposideros). Other animals include Eurasian otter (Lutra lutra), European badger (Meles meles), hazel dormouse (Muscardinus avellanarius), roe deer (Capreolus capreolus) and wood mouse (Apodemus sylvaticus). Birds include common kingfisher (Alcedo atthis), Eurasian bullfinch (Pyrrhula pyrrhula), European green woodpecker (Picus viridis), silver-washed fritillary (Argynnis paphia), song thrush (Turdus philomelos) and white-throated dipper (Cinclus cinclus). The comma (Polygonia c-album) and common brimstone (Gonepteryx rhamni) butterflies may be seen.

== Sources ==
- Biodiversity of Eastern Mendip – Sub-site: Harridge Wood, BGS: British Geological Survey
- Harridge Woods Leafet (PDF), Somerset Wildlife Trust
- Harridge Woods Nature Reserve, Somerset Wildlife Trust
- Harridge Wood Area Nature Reserves, Cerberus Spelæological Society
- Medieval and post-medieval coal mining remains in Harridge Wood and Edford Wood South, Historic England
- The Nettlebridge valley, BGS: British Geological Survey
