= Langford Heathfield =

Nature reserve in Somerset, England

- Site of Special Scientific Interest
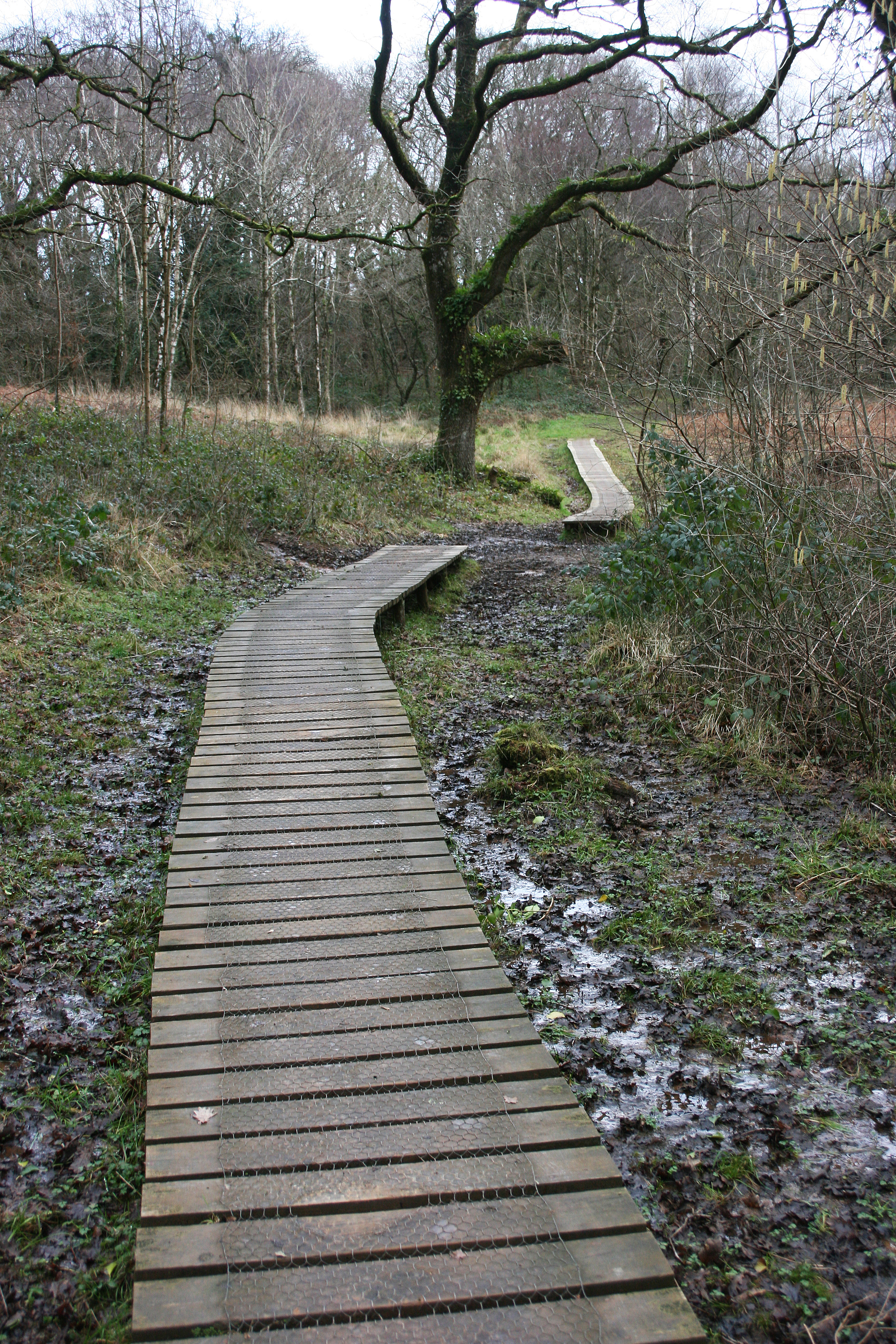

- Location within Somerset
- Location of Langford Heathfield.
- Area of search: Somerset
- Grid reference: ST100235
- Coordinates: 51.00382°N 3.28407°W
- Interest: Biological
- Area: 95.4 hectares (0.954 km^{2}; 0.368 sq mi)
- Notification date: 1966

Langford Heathfield (grid reference ST100235) is a 95.4 hectare (235.7 acre) biological Site of Special Scientific Interest at Langford Budville, 3 km (1.9 mi) north west of Wellington in Somerset, notified in 1966.

Most of this Somerset Wildlife Trust reserve was purchased in 1982 with Coram’s wood and Lucas’s Copse added in 1985. The purchases were generously assisted by World Wide Fund for Nature, the Countryside Agency, English Nature, Taunton Deane Borough Council, Somerset County Council and the Royal Society for Nature Conservation.

Langford Heathfield comprises a variety of semi-natural habitats which includes neutral marshy grassland and ancient woodland. An outstanding assemblage of 26 different species of resident breeding butterflies have been recorded. Of these marsh fritillary (Euphydryas aurina), high brown fritillary (Argynnis cydippe), wood white (Leptidea sinapis) and brown hairstreak (Thecla betulae) all have a local distribution in Somerset. Other invertebrates of interest include the very local beetles: Mordellistena abdominalis and Ischnomera caerulea, and hornet (Vespa crabro).

Four species of reptile are present: adder (Vipera berus), grass snake (Natrix natrix), slow-worm (Anguis fragilis) and common lizard (Lacerta vivipara). Palmate newts (Triturus helveticus) occur in the ponds and common frogs (Rana temporaria) are frequent. A wide range of birds have been recorded including nightingale (Luscinia megarhynchos) and grasshopper warbler (Locustella naevia).
