= Ringdown SSSI, Somerset =

Protected area in Somerset, England

Ringdown
- Site of Special Scientific Interest
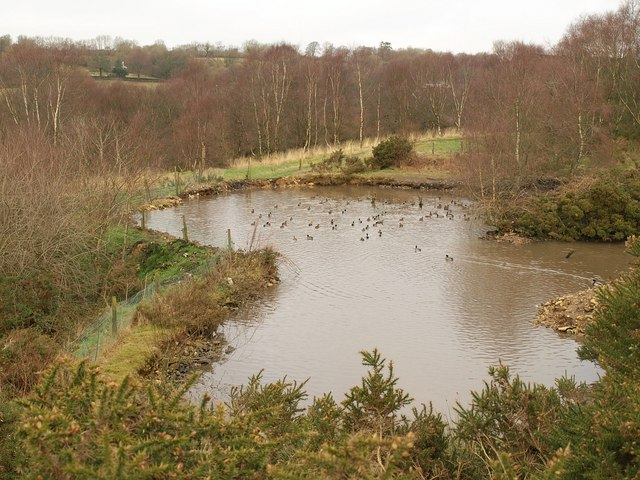

- Location within Somerset
- Location of Ringdown.
- Area of search: Somerset
- Grid reference: ST178155
- Coordinates: 50.93307°N 3.17112°W
- Interest: Biological
- Area: 4.0 hectares (0.040 km^{2}; 0.015 sq mi)
- Notification date: 1990

Ringdown (grid reference ST178155) is a 4.0 hectare (9.9 acre) biological Site of Special Scientific Interest west of Burnworthy in the Blackdown Hills of Somerset, notified in 1990.

The site is located on a valley side in the Blackdown Hills where outcrops of both Cretaceous Upper Greensand and underlying Triassic Keuper Marls occur. Amongst the vegetation present are two species which are very restricted in South West Britain, white beaksedge (Rhynchospora alba) and dioecious sedge (Carex dioica). This site is the only known location for the latter in Somerset. A colony of the small pearl-bordered fritillary (Boloria selene) is found here.
