= Thurlbear Wood and Quarrylands =

Nature reserve in Somerset, England

- Site of Special Scientific Interest
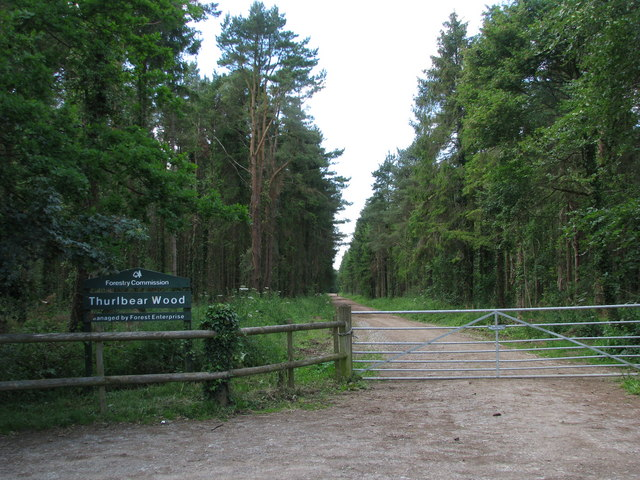

- Location within Somerset
- Location of Thurlbear Wood and Quarrylands.
- Area of search: Somerset
- Grid reference: ST270210
- Coordinates: 50.9837°N 3.0413°W
- Interest: Biological
- Area: 26.7 hectares (0.267 km^{2}; 0.103 sq mi)
- Notification date: 1963

Thurlbear Wood and Quarrylands (grid reference ST270210) is a 26.7 hectare (65.8 acre) biological Site of Special Scientific Interest south of Stoke St Mary in Somerset, notified in 1963. Part of the land designated as Thurlbear Wood and Quarrylands Site of Special Scientific Interest is owned by the Crown Estate.

Thurlbear Wood is a species-rich woodland, formerly managed in a traditional coppice-with-standards system and situated on soils derived from Rhaetic shales and limestones. It is managed by the Somerset Wildlife Trust. The recorded history of the site, its Medieval embankments and the presence of several plants normally confined to primary woods, all suggest that Thurlbear is of considerable antiquity. The woodland has been used for educational and research work for more than 60 years. The 'quarrylands' are an area of calcareous grassland, and scrub occupying 19th-century workings in Lias limestone. Over 80 species of flowering plant occur. There is an outstanding butterfly fauna, with 29 species recorded. Breeding birds associated with the site include buzzard (Buteo buteo), nightingale (Luscinia megarhynchos), and grasshopper warbler (Locustella naevia).
