= Cheddar Wood =

Protected area in Somerset, England

- Site of Special Scientific Interest
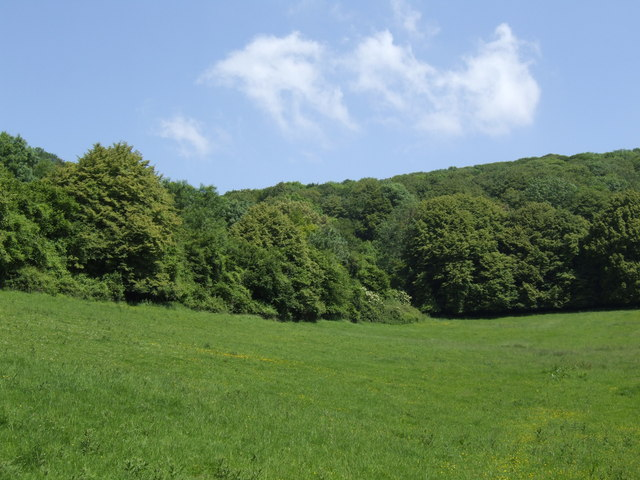

- Location within Somerset
- Location of Cheddar Wood.
- Area of search: Somerset
- Grid reference: ST445552
- Coordinates: 51.29321°N 2.79733°W
- Interest: Biological
- Area: 86.9 hectares (0.869 km^{2}; 0.336 sq mi)
- Notification date: 1967

Cheddar Wood (grid reference ST445552) is an 86.9-hectare (215-acre) biological Site of Special Scientific Interest at Cheddar in the Mendip Hills, Somerset, England, notified in 1967.

Cheddar Wood and the smaller Macall's Wood near Cheddar Gorge are what remains of the wood of the Bishops of Bath and Wells in the thirteenth century and of King Edmund the Magnificent's wood in the tenth. It lies on carboniferous limestone with rock showing through the thin topsoils. In 1801 the wood was larger than it is today. During the nineteenth century its lower fringes were grubbed out to make strawberry fields, most of which have reverted to woodland. It was coppiced until 1917.

This site comprises a range of habitats which includes ancient and secondary semi-natural broadleaved woodland, unimproved neutral grassland and a mosaic of calcareous grassland and acidic dry dwarf-shrub heath. Two nationally rare plant species are present. Additional interest lies in the invertebrate fauna. Cheddar Wood is one of only a few English stations for starved wood-sedge (Carex depauperata), which grows in the lane along the east side of the wood. The nationally rare purple gromwell (Lithospermum purpurocaeruleum) grows in the lane along the west side of the wood. Butterflies include silver-washed fritillary (Argynnis paphia), dark green fritillary (Argynnis aglaja), pearl-bordered fritillary (Boloria euphrosyne), holly blue (Celastrina argiolus) and brown argus (Aricia agestis). The slug Arion fasciatus, which has a restricted distribution in the south of England, and the soldier beetle Cantharis fusca also occur.

The site is managed as two nature reserves by Somerset Wildlife Trust Cheddar Wood Edge which covers 7.1 hectares (18 acres) of old strawberry fields, is now reverting to semi species-rich limestone grassland and scrub with ancient woodland hedges, and Cheddar Wood itself which has restricted access allowed by permit.
