= Long Dole Wood and Meadows SSSI =

Protected area in Somerset, England

Long Dole Wood and Meadows
- Site of Special Scientific Interest
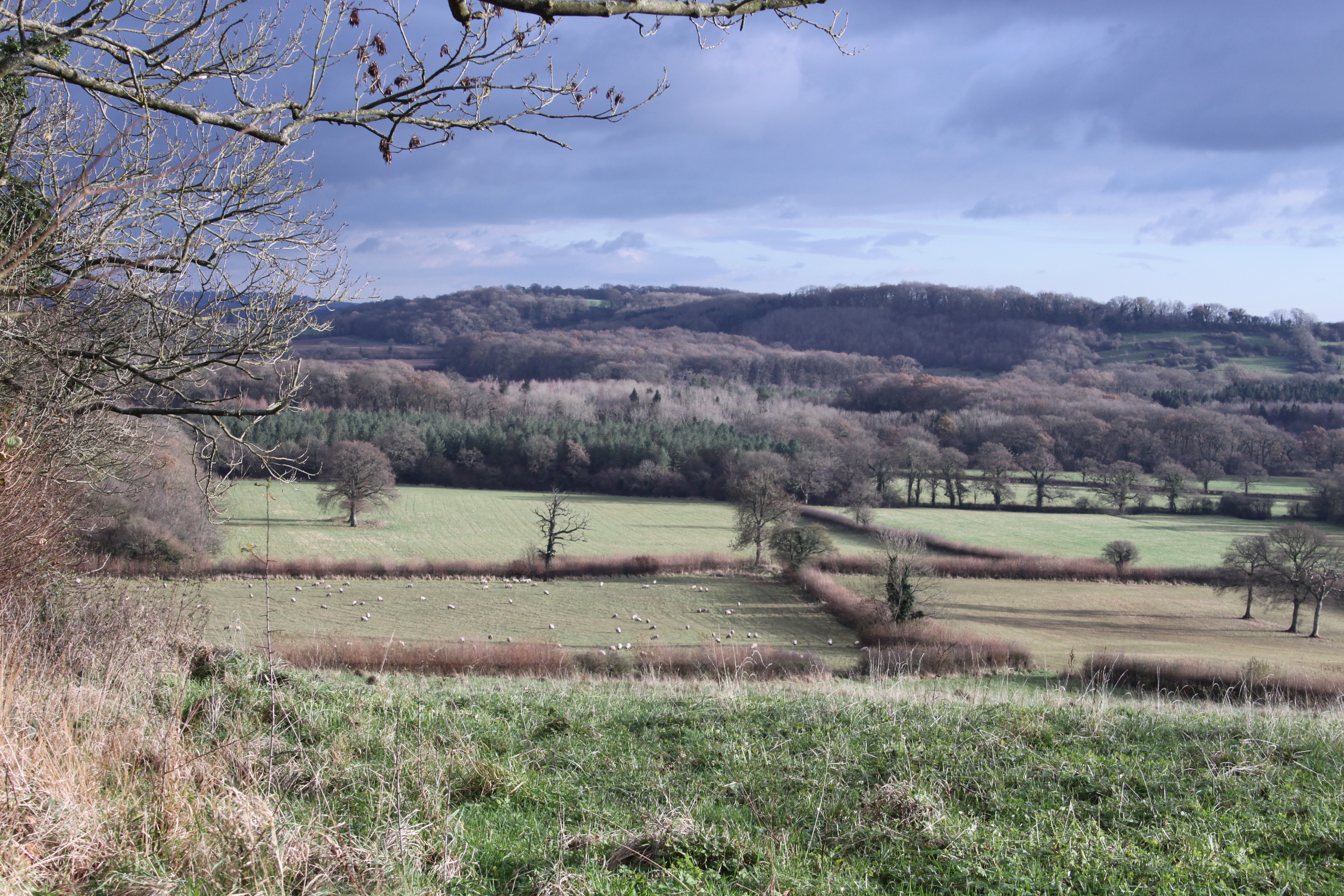

- Location within Somerset
- Location of Long Dole Wood and Meadows.
- Area of search: Avon
- Grid reference: ST610562
- Coordinates: 51.30358°N 2.56083°W
- Interest: Biological
- Area: 9.8 hectares (0.098 km^{2}; 0.038 sq mi)
- Notification date: 1987

Long Dole Wood and Meadows SSSI (grid reference ST610562) is a 9.8 hectares (24 acres) biological Site of Special Scientific Interest (SSSI) between the villages of Farrington Gurney and Hinton Blewitt in Bath and North East Somerset, notified in 1987.

The majority of the SSSI is made up of the Hollow Marsh nature reserve run by the Somerset Wildlife Trust which covers 7.9 hectares (20 acres). The site was previously called Holly Marsh. The meadows are summer grazed, with a heath grass and sedge environment with orchids.

The site is situated on the flood plain of a valley formed by a tributary of the Cam Brook and support two neutral grassland communities with a restricted British distribution. Two ancient woodland sites are also present with ash, oak, hazel, wych elm and other tree varieties which show evidence of coppicing. The ground flora includes Solomon's seal (Polygonatum multiflorum).

When the site was recorded as an SSSI it supported a strong breeding population of the marsh fritillary (Eurodryas aurinia), however this declined in the late 20th century, and this species is no longer found at the site.
