= Church of St Peter & St Paul, Churchstanton =

Church in Somerset, England

Church of St Peter & St Paul
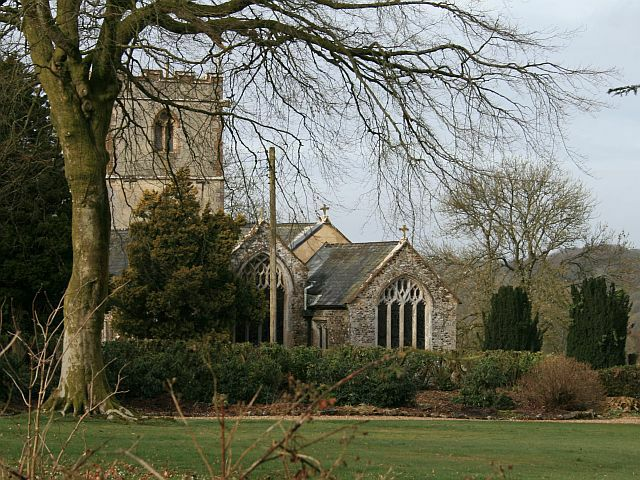

- Location within Somerset

General information
- Location: Churchstanton, England
- Coordinates: 50.9242°N 3.1467°W
- Completed: 14th century

The Anglican Church of St Peter & St Paul in Churchstanton, Somerset, England dates from the 14th century and has been designated as a Grade I listed building.

Restoration work was carried out in 1719 and in 1830 a west gallery was added. The rood screen was added in 1910.

The church consists of a four-bay nave and a chancel which is at an angle to the nave and has a waggon roof.

Within the church are a Norman or Romanesque font and Jacobean pulpit. The font has a Hamstone square bowl which is supported by columns of Purbeck Marble.

The parish is part of the Blackdown benefice which is within the Diocese of Bath and Wells.

== See also ==
- List of Grade I listed buildings in Taunton Deane
- List of towers in Somerset
- List of ecclesiastical parishes in the Diocese of Bath and Wells
