= Chancellor's Farm =

Nature reserve in Somerset, England

- Site of Special Scientific Interest
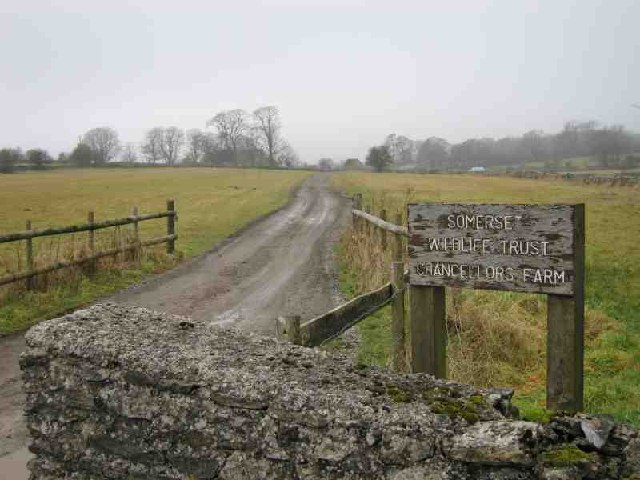

- Location within Somerset
- Location of Chancellor's Farm.
- Area of search: Somerset
- Grid reference: ST525525
- Coordinates: 51.26966°N 2.68225°W
- Interest: Biological
- Area: 34.2 hectares (0.342 km^{2}; 0.132 sq mi)
- Notification date: 1984

Chancellor's Farm (grid reference ST525525) is a 34.2-hectare (84.6 acre) biological Site of Special Scientific Interest just north of Priddy in the Mendip Hills, Somerset, notified in 1984.

The site, which is close to the Yoxter military range, is operated as a restricted-access nature reserve by the Somerset Wildlife Trust.

This site provides outstanding examples of some of the grassland communities associated with the higher parts of the Mendip plateau. The soils include a mixture of wind-deposited silts and weathered material from the parent Carboniferous Limestone. The grassland is a type characterised by Sweet Vernal Grass (Anthoxanthum odoratum), Red Fescue (Festuca rubra), Common Bent (Agrostis capillaris), Pignut (Conopodium majus) and Sorrel (Rumex acetosa). Of particular interest is the abundance of Common Bluebell (Hyacinthoides non-scripta), a species rare outside woodland habitats in Somerset.

The site includes extensive remains of lead mining from the medieval period to the early 18th century, with some evidence of iron mining in the north east corner of the site.
