= Castle School, Taunton =

The Castle School

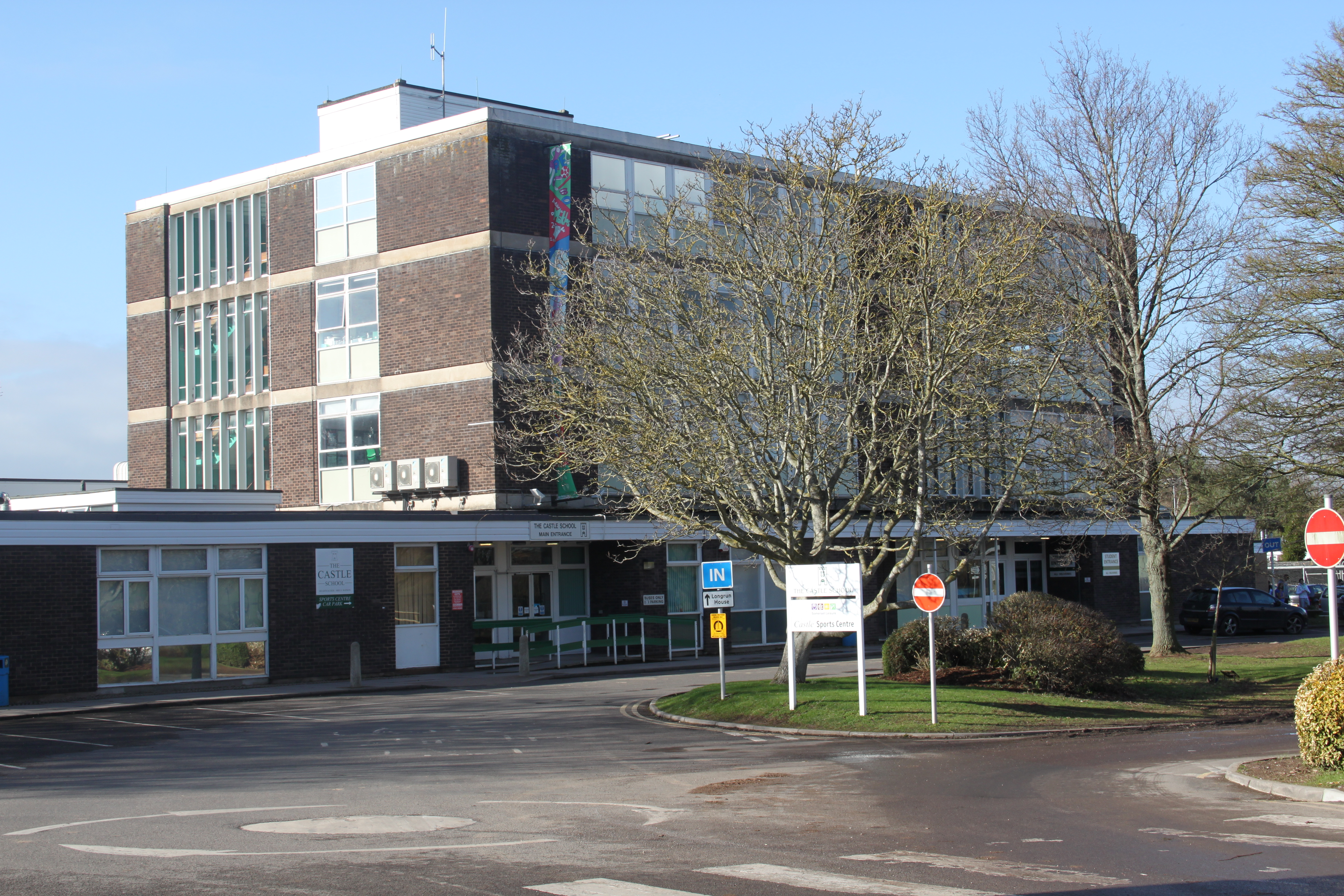

Location
- Wellington Road; Taunton, Somerset, TA1 5AU; England; 51.0169°N 3.1179°W

Information
- Type: Academy
- Motto: Achieve, Belong, Participate
- Established: 1966; 60 years ago
- Trust: Blackdown Education Partnership
- Department for Education URN: 136916 Tables
- Chair of Governors: Patricia Rendell
- Head teacher: Jamie Wordsworth
- Staff: 150
- Gender: Mixed
- Age: 11 to 16
- Enrolment: 1200
- Houses: Balmoral, Lancaster, Caernarfon, Buckingham, Windsor, Sandringham
- Colours: Green, Black & Gold
- Website: castle.bep.ac

The Castle School is a secondary school in Taunton, Somerset, England. It has 1200 pupils aged 11 to 16 and had specialist Sports College status in 2003. It was granted a second specialism in Vocational Education. During the school's Ofsted inspection in 2009, it received an "outstanding" rating in 26 out of 27 criteria. In 2023 it again received an Outstanding judgement from Ofsted - the first comprehensive secondary school in the south west of England to be judged outstanding under the new framework. In July 2011, the school became an Academy.

== Site ==
The original parts of the building include the tower block, and the ground floor building connected to it, which covers the main hall and science blocks. The newer buildings include the Qdos Building, which opened in 2010 replacing two ageing mobile huts and partly extending the Jubilee building, the Sealy Building, Sports Hall and Sports Centre and the Jubilee Building which opened in 2003. The newest additions are the Naylor Building and the New Dining Hall. This has enabled departments to grow and offer more to its pupils by way of facilities and improved teaching rooms.

== Sport ==
The Castle School is heavily involved in sport and offers pupils a wide variety of sports such as football, basketball, tennis, golf, hockey, athletics, and many more to participate in. The Castle school has a 3G pitch and athletics track, as well as the usual sports facilities.
