= Bishopswood Meadows =

Nature reserve in Somerset, England

Coordinates: 50.912°N 3.064°W

Bishopswood Meadows is a nature reserve situated within the Blackdown Hills Area of Outstanding Natural Beauty in the county of Somerset, England. The reserve comprises five fields totalling 9.3 hectares (23 acres); all of the fields are on a gentle north-facing slope with the River Yarty at the base. The reserve, formerly part of Woodend Farm, was purchased by Somerset Wildlife Trust in 1991–92.

== Geology ==
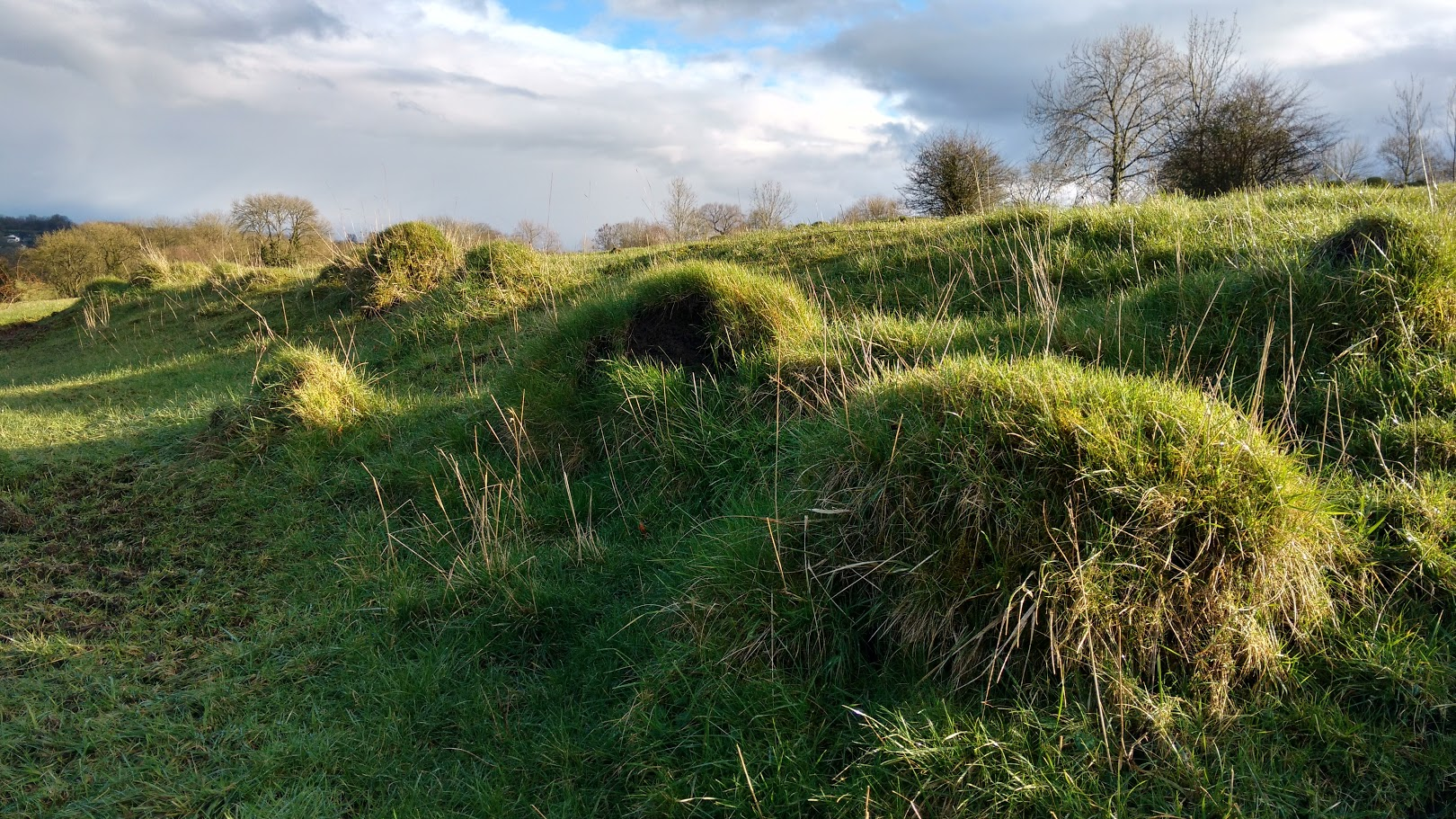
Small slag heaps still visible

The underlying geology is mostly lower Lias Group clays and limestone. In the second half of the 19th century an extensive lime burning industry was based around the Bishopswood area.

The impact of this is still obvious today with a Lime Kiln, distinctive key hole shaped quarry, spoil heaps (tailings), access tracks and paths still clearly discernible within the reserve.

== Lime Kiln ==
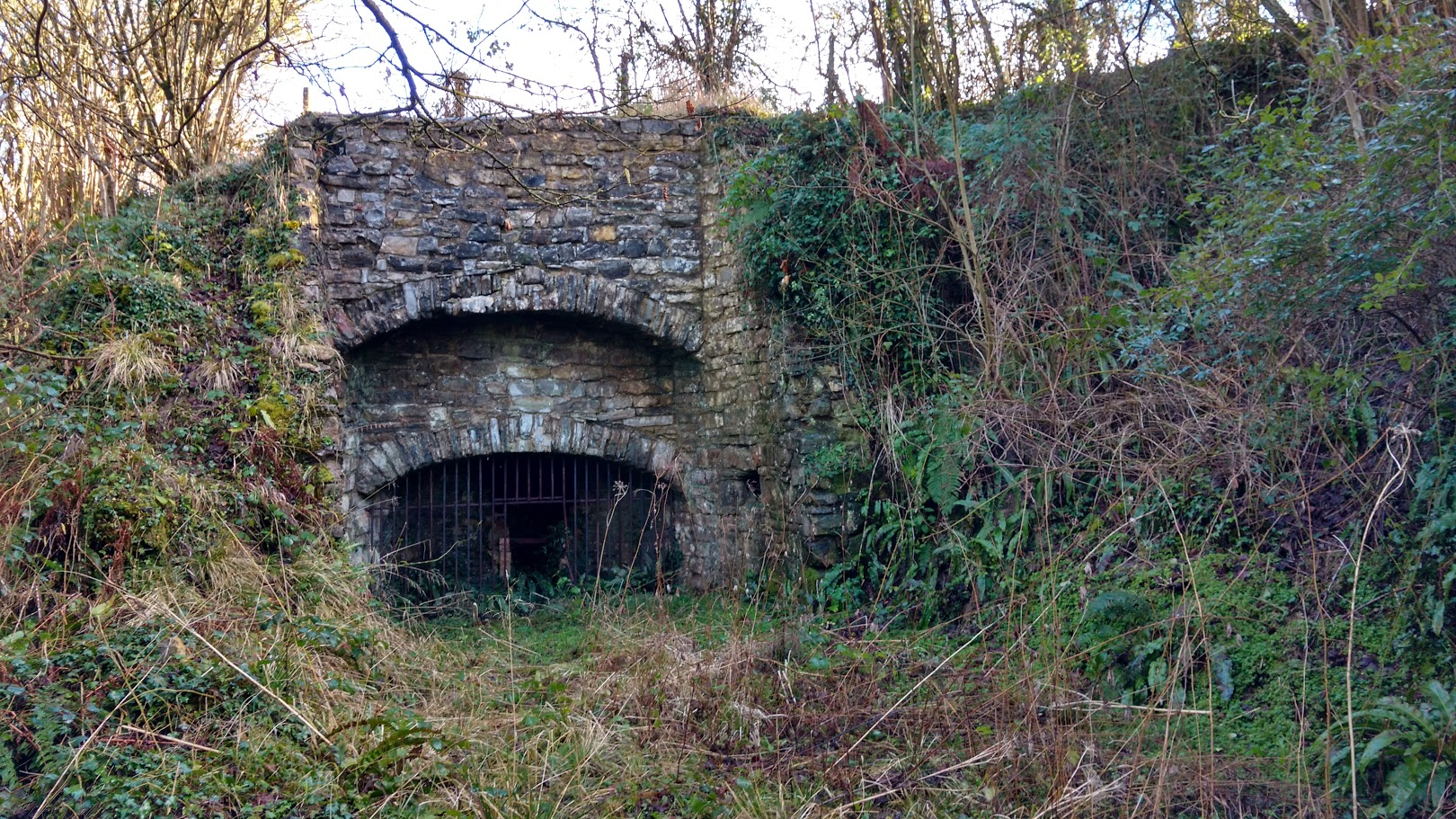
The remains of the lime kiln

Much of the soil on the Blackdown Hills is very acidic. After the 1851 inclosure acts there was a huge demand for lime as farmers wanted to spread lime on the newly enclosed commons to reduce the acidity of the soil. As a result, an extensive lime burning industry grew around the Bishopswood area and continued throughout the century. Quicklime was also an essential resource for the building industry. Quicklime (Calcium Oxide) was mixed with water to make slaked lime which was used as a putty and whitewash. It was also mixed with sand to make lime mortar, often considered superior to modern cements as it allows the building to breathe. The kiln, which has a capacity of 19 tons, is of stone construction and stands at approximately four meters high. It was sited to make use of the prevailing wind and was ignited with brushwood. The kiln is lined with red shale or slate and would have reached a temperature of 1000 °C in its hottest point, the burning zone. Limestone and fuel (coal or culm) were placed in alternating layers at the top of the kiln. The limestone would have come from the adjacent quarry and it is likely that the fuel was from South Wales, transported via the Chard Canal. The burnt "lump lime" (quicklime) fell through a grate at the bottom of the kiln and was removed from below.

== Wildlife ==
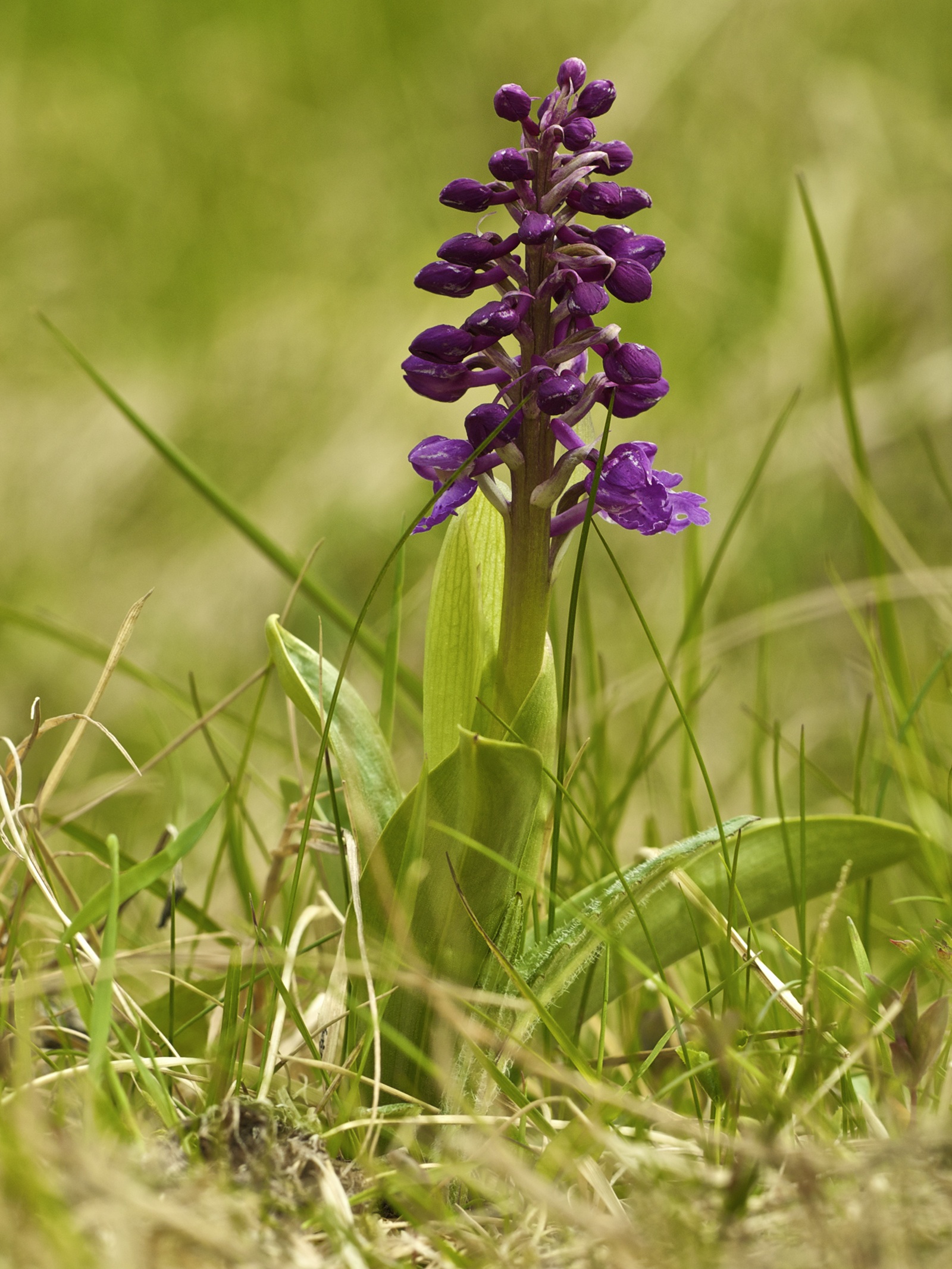
A small early purple orchid

Much of the wildlife interest at the reserve is due to its history of quarrying activity. The mix of calcareous (lime rich) and neutral soil conditions attract an interesting range of animals.

Many calcareous species such as cowslip, quaking grass and dwarf thistle thrive in the reserve's old quarry and spoil heaps. The early purple orchid is also common in some areas.

One field consists of unimproved rush pasture with species such as common spotted orchid, marsh marigold and ragged robin. The River Yarty is also an important habitat, used by otter, kingfisher, dipper and golden-ringed dragonfly.

All of the fields in the reserve have thick hedgerows of hazel, hawthorn, field maple, ash, holly amongst others. Dormice can be spotted amongst these hedgerows as well as common blue, ringlet and marbled white butterflies.

== Conservation ==
The reserve is managed by the Somerset Wildlife Trust who aim to maintain the existing wildlife rich areas and increase the species diversity of the reserve.
