= Quants Reserve =

Nature reserve in Somerset, England

Quants
- Site of Special Scientific Interest
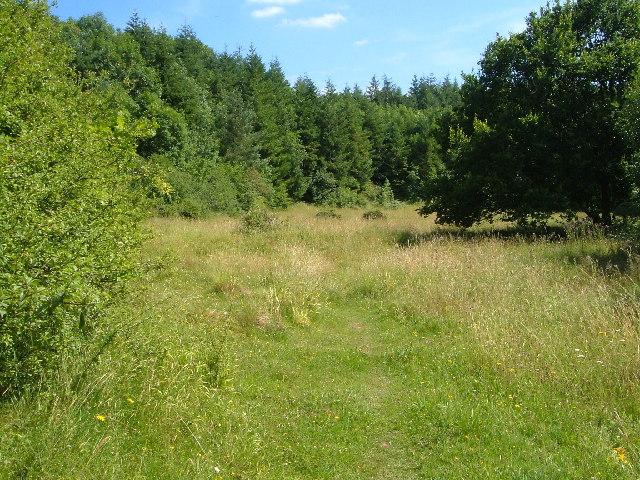

- Location within Somerset
- Location of Quants.
- Area of search: Somerset
- Grid reference: ST185175
- Coordinates: 50.954°N 3.160°W
- Interest: Biological
- Area: 50.6 hectares (0.506 km^{2}; 0.195 sq mi)
- Notification date: 1988

Quants Reserve is a nature reserve north west of Burnworthy in Somerset, England.

It consists of a grassland clearing in a forestry plantation. It is well known for its butterflies — among the species which occur are Duke of Burgundy, marsh fritillary and wood white.

In 1988 an area of 50.6 hectares (126.0 acres) was designated as a Biological Site of Special Scientific Interest.
