= Bishop's Wood =

Nature reserve in Swansea, Wales

Coordinates: 51.5730°N 4.0314°W

Bishop's Wood (Welsh: Coed yr Esgob) is a nature reserve in the Gower Peninsula, south Wales.

The area consists of 46 acres (19 hectares) of limestone woodland and grassland. Part of the wood is classified as ancient woodland. The 1673 survey of Bishopston Manor indicates that it has been wooded since at least the seventeenth century.

It was designated a Local Nature Reserve (LNR) in 1975, a Site of Special Scientific Interest (SSSI) in 2003 and Special Area of Conservation (SAC) in 2004.
