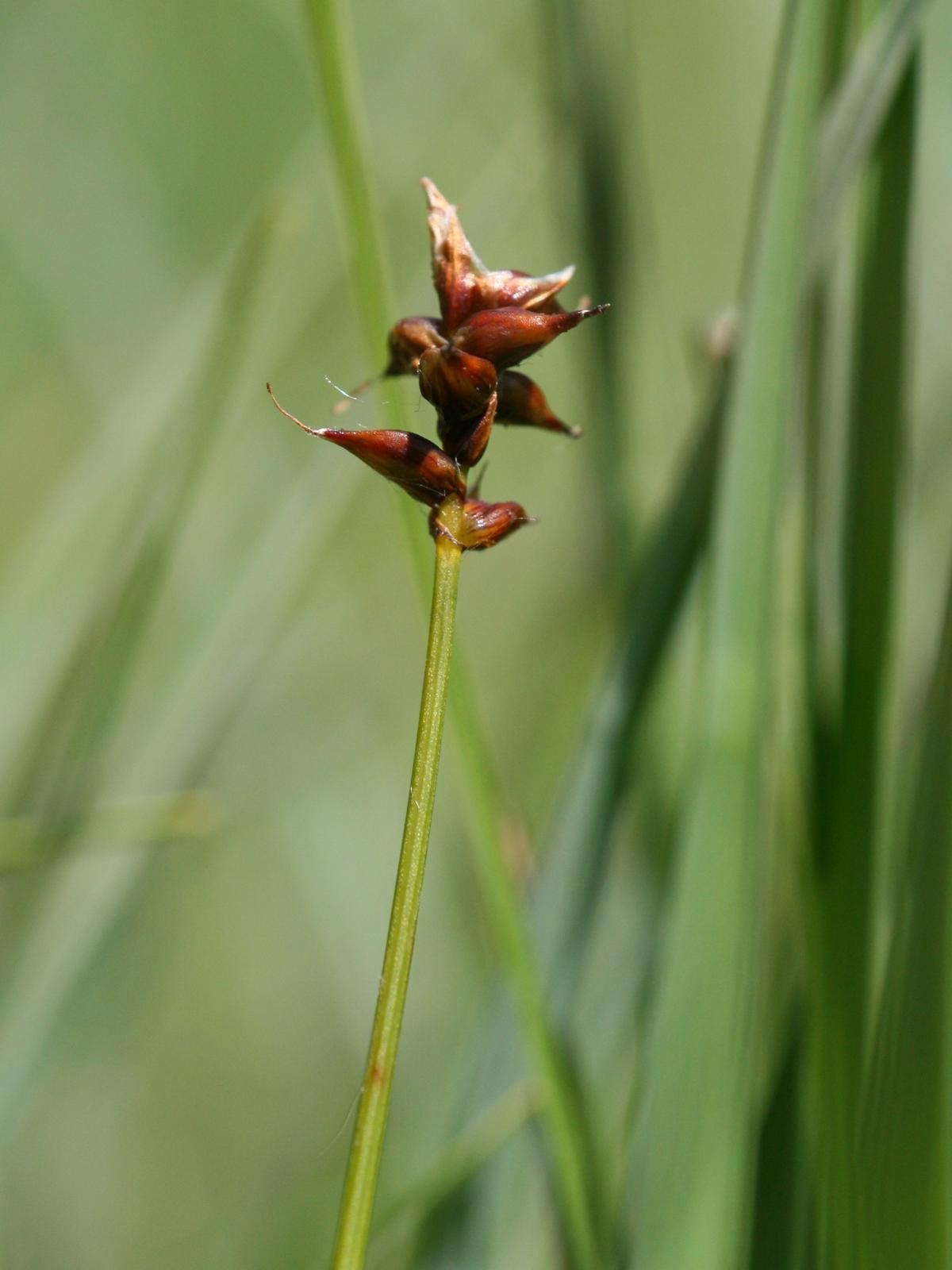
- A female individual's inflorescence
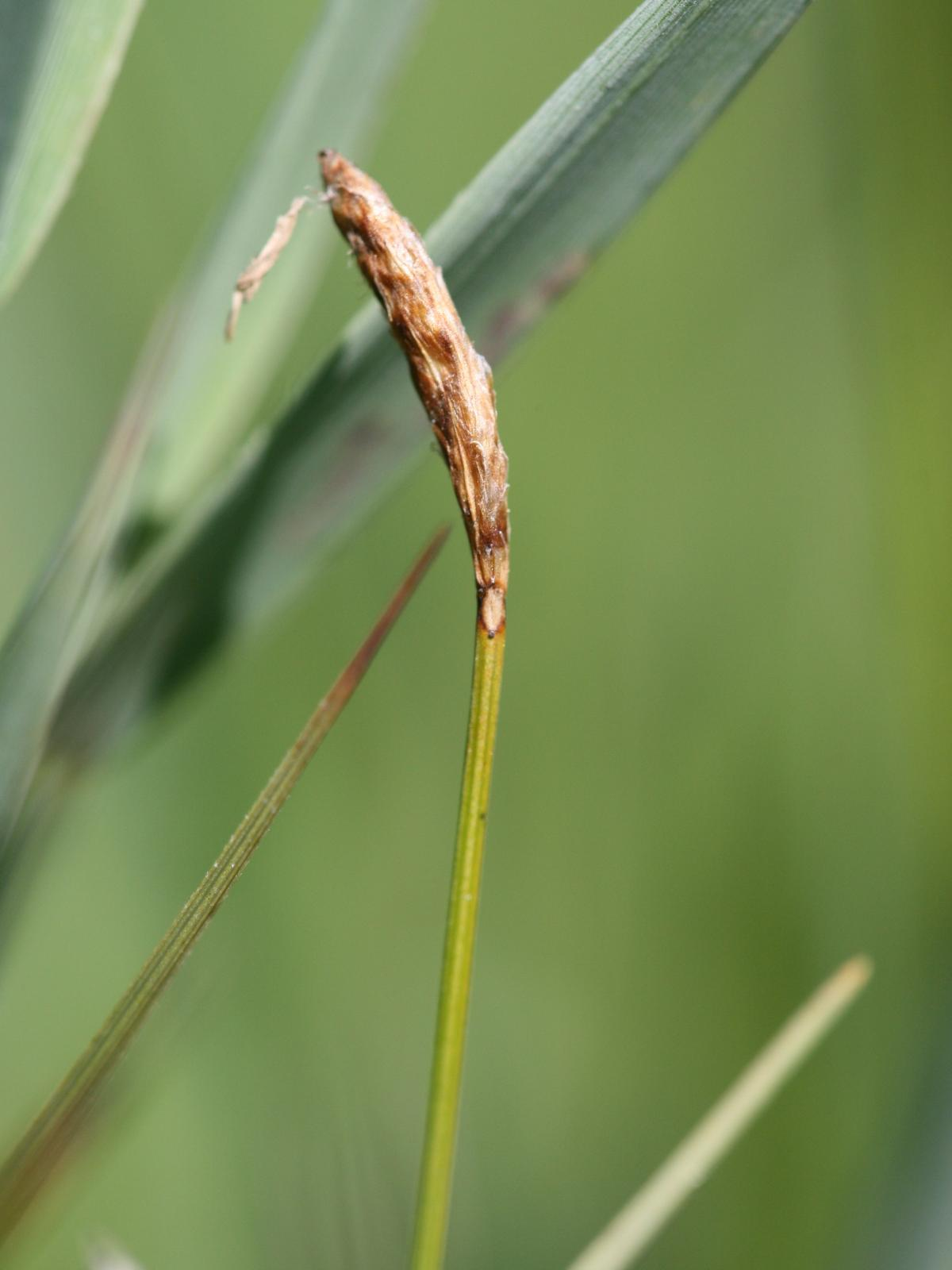
- A male individual's inflorescence

Scientific classification
- Kingdom: Plantae
- Clade: Tracheophytes
- Clade: Angiosperms
- Clade: Monocots
- Clade: Commelinids
- Order: Poales
- Family: Cyperaceae
- Genus: Carex
- Species: C. dioica

Binomial name
- Carex dioica L.

Synonyms
- List: Carex casteriana Heer ex Boott; Carex chlamydea Norman; Carex dioiscostrongyla St.-Lag.; Carex laevis Hoppe; Carex linnaeana Host; Carex linnaei Degl.; Carex metteniana (O.Lang) C.B.Lehm. ex Schur; Carex nigricans Dewey; Caricinella laevis (Heuff.) St.-Lag.; Maukschia laevis Heuff.; Physiglochis dioica (L.) Raf.; Psyllophora dioica (L.) Schur; Vignea dioica (L.) Rchb.

= Carex dioica =

Species of grass-like plant

Carex dioica, the dioecious sedge (a name it shares with Carex sterilis), is a species of flowering plant in the genus Carex, native to Iceland, the Faroes, Svalbard, nearly all of Europe, western Siberia, and the Altai. It prefers to live in calcareous fens.
