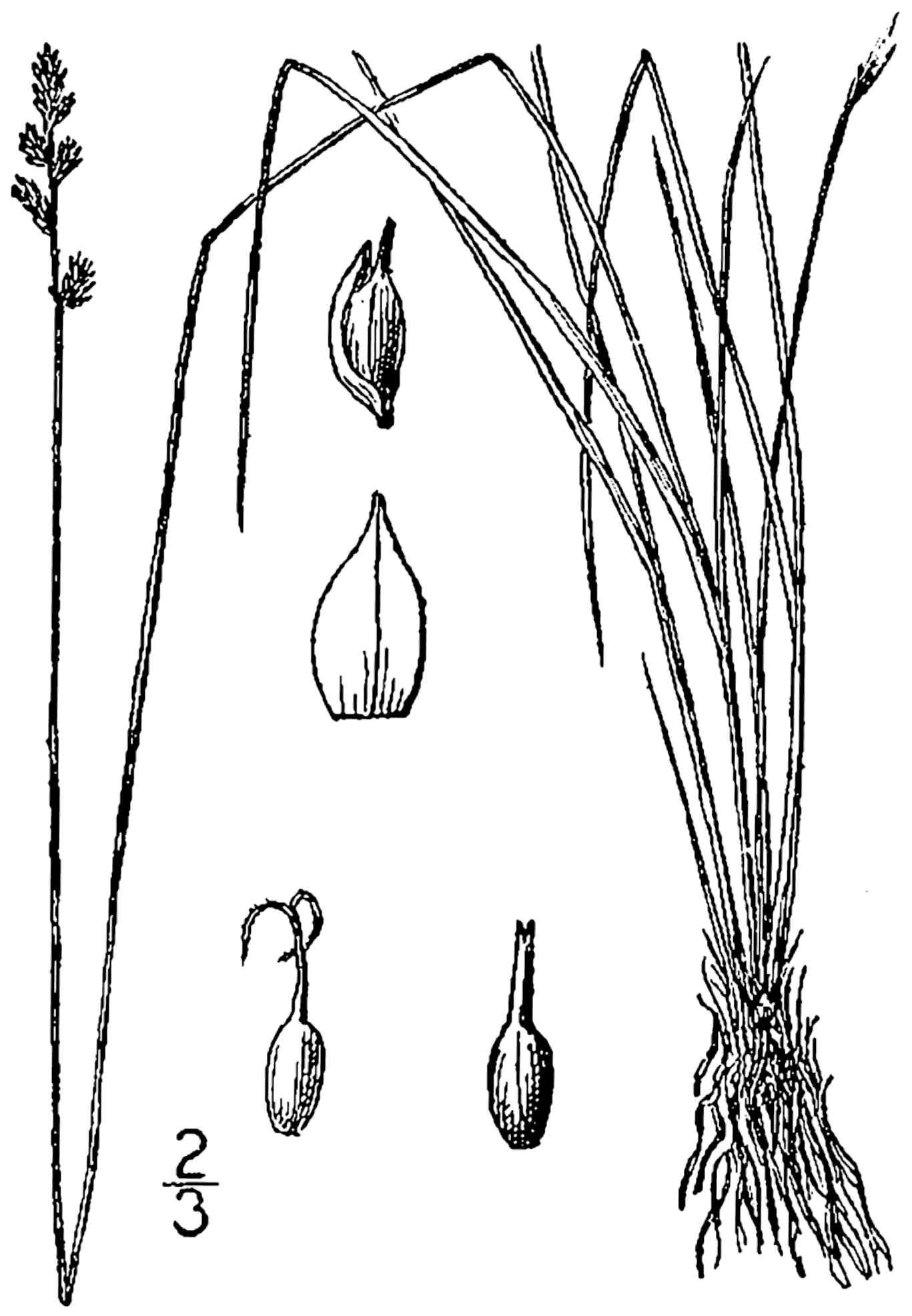
- 1913 Illustration

Conservation status
- Least Concern (IUCN 3.1)

Scientific classification
- Kingdom: Plantae
- Clade: Embryophytes
- Clade: Tracheophytes
- Clade: Spermatophytes
- Clade: Angiosperms
- Clade: Monocots
- Clade: Commelinids
- Order: Poales
- Family: Cyperaceae
- Genus: Carex
- Species: C. sterilis

Binomial name
- Carex sterilis Willd.

Synonyms
- List: Carex elachycarpa; Carex muricata L. var. sterilis; Carex × minganinsularum; Kobresia elachycarpa

= Carex sterilis =

Species of grass-like plant

Carex sterilis, common names dioecious sedge, sterile sedge and Atlantic sedge, is a perennial plant native to North America.

== Description ==
Carex sterilis is a perennial, rhizomatous, tuft-forming plant growing up to 30 inches in height. Leaves are alternate, flat, smooth, up to 10 inches long, with tightly wrapped sheaths. Basal stems have brownish sheaths. The inflorescence takes the form of multiple spikes, with male and female spikes on separate plants. The fruit is an achene, appearing in June to July.

== Distribution and habitat ==
This species favours wetland habitat, especially calcareous fenlands, marshes, meadows, around laves and rivers.

=== Conservation status in the United States ===
Although not believed to be of immediate concern on a global scale, Carex sterilis is listed as a special concern in Connecticut, as threatened in Maine, Massachusetts and Minnesota, as endangered in Pennsylvania, as historical in Rhode Island, and as endangered and possibly extirpated in Tennessee.
