= Equestrian statue of Edward Horner =

Sculpture in Mells, Somerset, England

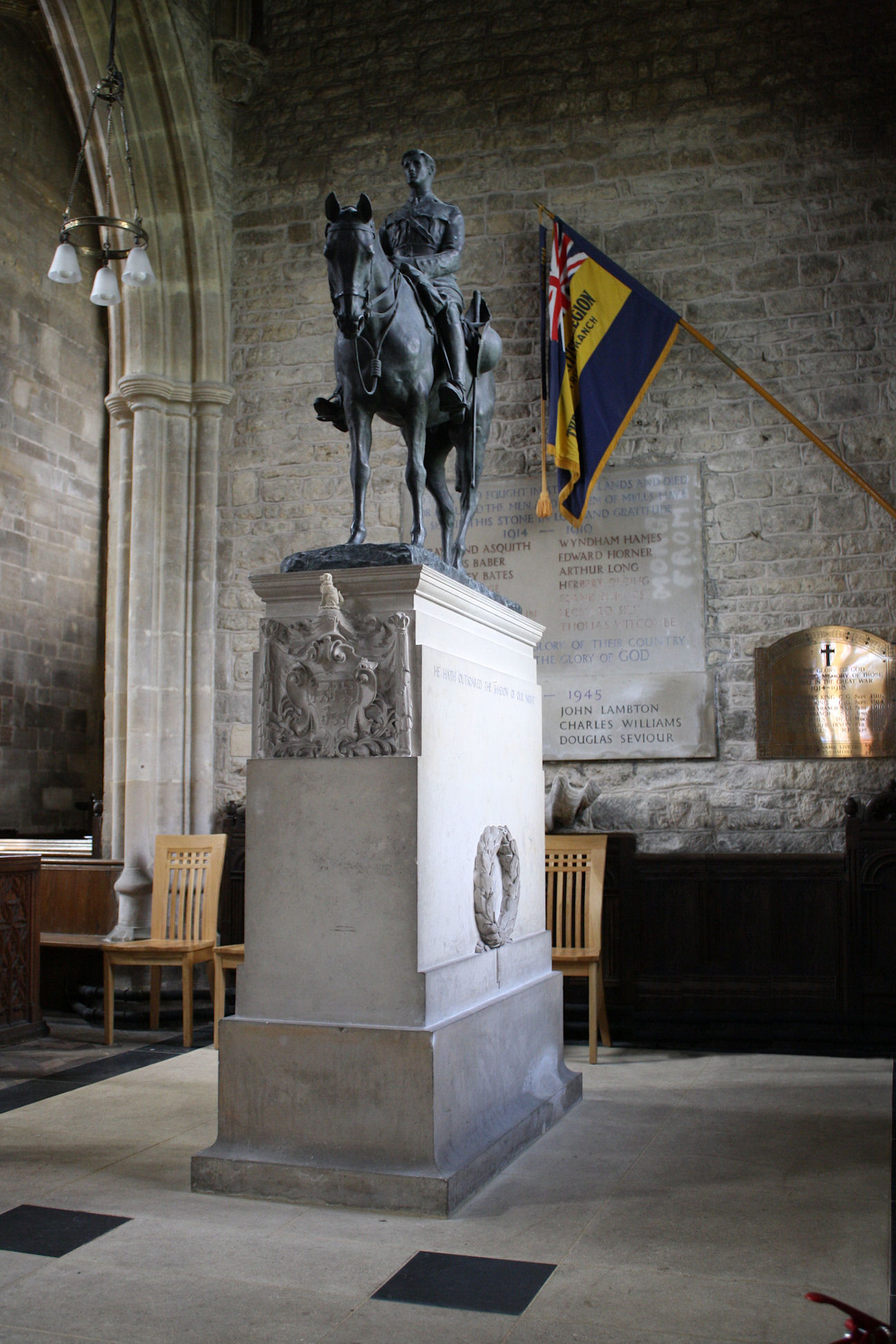
- Artist: Sir Alfred Munnings (statue); Sir Edwin Lutyens (plinth)
- Completion date: 1920
- Type: Sculpture (Equestrian statue)
- Medium: Bronze
- Subject: Edward Horner
- Location: Mells, Somerset, England; 51.2421°N 2.3912°W

The equestrian statue of Edward Horner stands inside St Andrew's Church in the village of Mells in Somerset, south-western England. It was designed by the architect Sir Edwin Lutyens, as a memorial to Edward Horner, who died of wounds in the First World War. The sculpture was executed by Sir Alfred Munnings.

Edward Horner was the only surviving son and heir of Sir John and Lady Frances Horner of Mells Manor and a member of an extended upper-class social group known as the Coterie, many of whom were killed in the war. Shortly after the war broke out, he was a yeomanry officer in the part-time Territorial Force but he was keen to join the fighting on the Western Front and obtained a transfer to a cavalry regiment through his family's connections. He was wounded in May 1915, losing a kidney, and did not return to the war until early 1917. He was assigned a staff post but again secured a transfer to the front line. Shortly after his return to the fighting, on 21 November 1917, he was wounded again; he died the same day.

Lutyens was a friend of the Horner family, having designed multiple buildings and structures for them since the beginning of the 20th century. As well as Horner's memorial, he designed a memorial to Raymond Asquith (also in St Andrew's Church), and Mells War Memorial in the centre of the village. For Horner's memorial, Lutyens designed the plinth himself, and engaged the renowned equestrian painter and war artist Alfred Munnings for the latter's first public work of sculpture. The plinth is in Portland stone and set into it is Horner's original grave marker; the family's coat of arms is carved into the front, while the sides bear various dedicatory inscriptions. The statue is a bronze of a cavalry officer on horseback, bare-headed, with his helmet and sword on the horse's saddle. Lutyens was known for abstract and ecumenical themes in his war memorial designs, but the statue of Horner is an example of his use of more conventional imagery to commemorate an individual. Installed in the Horner family chapel in St Andrew's Church in 1920 at a cost of £1,000, it was moved to its present location in the church in 2007.

== Biography ==
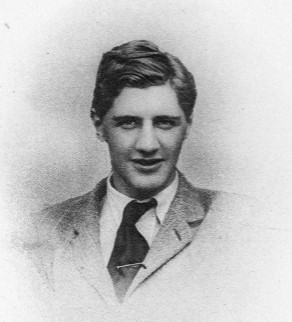
Portrait of Horner from Balliol College War Memorial Book 1914–1919 (1924)

Edward William Horner (born 3 May 1888) was the third child of Sir John Horner, KCVO, of Mells Manor, and his wife Frances (née Graham), and their first son. The family was reputed to be descendants of "Little Jack Horner", the subject of an 18th-century nursery rhyme. Sir John was a London barrister and later commissioner of woods, for which he was knighted in 1908. Frances was a prominent member of the Souls social group, whom she regularly hosted at Mells.

Edward was the last direct male heir of the Horner family, his younger brother (Mark) having died of scarlet fever before the war. He was educated at Summer Fields School near Oxford, then at Eton College and Balliol College, Oxford, where he was a member of the Officers' Training Corps. At Oxford, he became part of the social network known as the Coterie. The group was made up largely of heirs to aristocratic families and included Raymond Asquith, Horner's future brother-in-law. Many of them were frequent visitors to Mells Manor at the beginning of the 20th century. Horner vigorously pursued Lady Diana Manners, a leading light of The Coterie, without much success. He struggled academically, graduating from Oxford with only a third-class degree, much to the disappointment of his parents and particularly his mother, who concentrated all her ambitions on Edward after Mark's premature death. Struggling for career options, Edward pursued his parents' ambition for him to become a barrister. He was called to the bar, and began a pupillage in 1914 in the chambers of Hugh Fraser under the ultimate guidance of F. E. Smith, one of the most distinguished barristers of the day.

Like many contemporary men, especially those from aristocratic backgrounds, Horner felt a keen sense of patriotism fostered by his private education and by tales from imperial campaigns around the turn of the 20th century, especially the Second Boer War (1899–1902). On 19 August 1914, he was commissioned as a second lieutenant in the North Somerset Yeomanry, a part-time Territorial Force unit with no obligation to serve abroad. After the outbreak of the First World War in August 1914, his regiment was ordered to Hampshire for training. Unlike the men under his command, among them farmers who were reluctant to leave their land, Horner was keen to join the fighting in France. However, life in the North Somerset Yeomanry was not to Edward's liking. He wrote to his mother to complain that they had taken his two best hunters, and his man servant, and he was made to "sleep on bare boards" and rise at 5 a.m. As an influential aristocratic family, the Horners were able to secure him a transfer first to the Royal Horse Guards and then, in October 1914, to the 18th (Queen Mary's Own) Hussars. The 18th Hussars were stationed at Tidworth Camp in Wiltshire under the 11th Reserve Cavalry for training, after which they were deployed to the Western Front in early 1915.

Horner arrived first at Rouen, well behind the front, and then in February 1915 was ordered forward to Hazebrouck on the Belgian border. In May 1915, he was assigned to escort a working party to dig trenches on the north side of the Yser Canal. During the march, he was wounded in the abdomen by shrapnel from an artillery shell. Hospitalised at the No. 7 General Hospital at Boulogne in France, he had a kidney removed, and at one point his condition was so grave that his parents were given special permission to visit him. They were accompanied by Diana Manners and a private doctor and nurse. He left the hospital on 1 June and was allowed to return to Mells to recuperate for the summer of 1915. Eager to return to the front, Horner went before a medical board in December 1915 but was told that his missing kidney rendered him ineligible for front-line duties. He was sent again to Tidworth to await orders, which arrived in January 1916, instructing him to sail for Egypt. He was promoted to temporary lieutenant in November 1916.

He was first assigned a staff post in Egypt but was again able to transfer to a fighting role in France in February 1917. In October that year, the family's second home at Mells Park was destroyed by fire; Horner was given compassionate leave in early November and returned to the village to visit his parents. Returning to France, he was given command of a troop (16 soldiers and horses). The 18th Hussars were part of the Battle of Cambrai, where they were holding the village of Noyelles, south-east of Cambrai itself. He was hit in the groin on 21 November 1917 and evacuated to No. 48 Casualty Clearing Station near Ytres but died that evening. He is buried in Rocquigny-Equancourt Road British Cemetery, maintained by the Commonwealth War Graves Commission. The headstone for his grave in France contains the epitaph "Small time, but in that small most greatly lived this star of England", from Shakespeare's Henry V.

== Commissioning ==
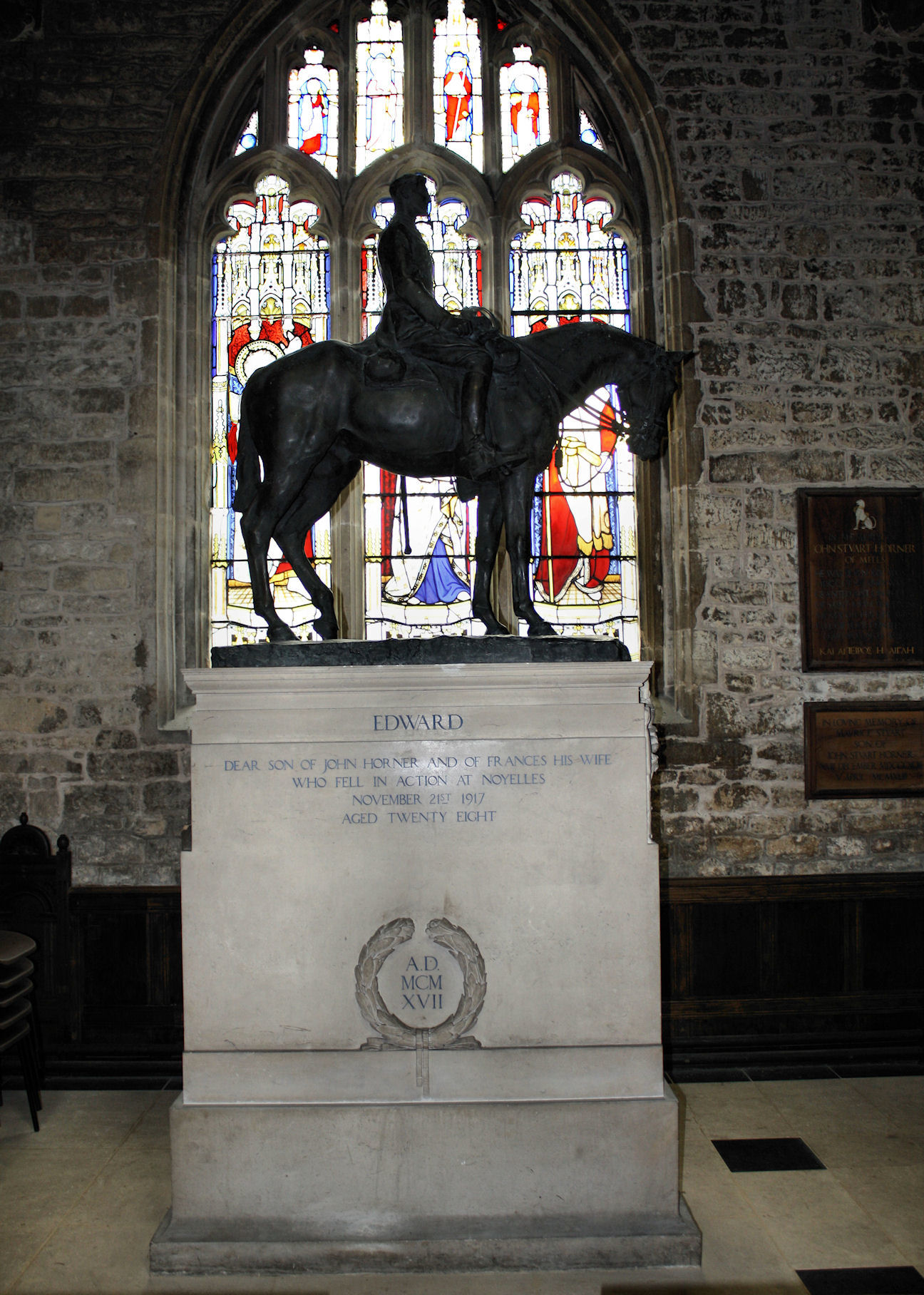
Side view of the memorial silhouetted by a stained-glass window

Sir Edwin Lutyens was among the most distinguished architects in Britain. He became a nationally renowned designer of war memorials following his work as an adviser to (and later one of the principal architects for) the Imperial War Graves Commission and his design for The Cenotaph on London's Whitehall. As well as dozens of public war memorials in towns and cities across Britain, Lutyens designed several private memorials to individual casualties, usually the sons of friends or clients. Many were heirs to the country houses Lutyens had built earlier in his career, as in Mells where he renovated the manor at the beginning of the 20th century. His work in Mells arose through his friend and collaborator Gertrude Jekyll, who introduced him to the Horners through a family connection. Lutyens established a friendship which led to multiple commissions in the village. In addition to his work on the manor, he redesigned its gardens and worked on several related buildings and structures, and after the war was responsible for a tribute to Raymond Asquith (Edward's brother-in-law), also located in St Andrew's Church, and the village war memorial. Lutyens designed two other memorials to Horner: a wooden board featuring a description of the events leading up to his death, which was placed on a wall in the family chapel in St Andrew's Church; (Note: The wooden memorial board in Mells bears the following wording: EDWARD WILLIAM HORNER LIEUTENANT IN THE EIGHTEENTH HUSSARS WHO WAS BORN ON THE 3RD OF MAY 1888 AND DIED THE 21ST OF NOVEMBER 1917 HE WAS GREATLY LOVED IN HIS HOME AT MELLS BUT WITH EAGER VALOUR HE LEFT HIS HERITAGE AT THE OUTBREAK OF WAR TO FIGHT IN FRANCE. SERIOUSLY WOUNDED AT YPRES HE RECOVERED AND RETURNED TO HIS REGIMENT AND FELL AT LAST IN PICARDY WHILST DEFENDING THE VILLAGE OF NOYELLES AGAINST THE GERMAN ARMY IN THE BATTLE OF CAMBRAI. THUS IN THE MORNING OF HIS YOUTH HE HASTENED TO REJOIN HIS FRIENDS AND COMRADES BY A SWIFT AND NOBLE DEATH. HIS GRAVE IS AT FINS NEAR ETRECOURT AND HIS ONLY BROTHER MARK IS BURIED IN THIS CHURCHYARD. IN THEIR LIVES THEY WERE THE LOVE OF MANY AND HAVING DIED ARE NOT DEAD. These words were described by historian W. J. Reader as "an epitaph of eighteenth-century elegance [that] expresses much of the romantic idealism of the early volunteers [and] a county family's sense of its own position in society".) and a stone tablet in Cambrai Cathedral. (Note: The placement of the tablet in France was arranged by Anglo-French writer Hilaire Belloc, who negotiated with the civil and ecclesiastical authorities. Belloc had lost his own son in the war, and the tablet to the memory of Edward Horner was erected opposite the tablet for Belloc's son which was in the entrance to the Lady Chapel in Cambrai Cathedral. Belloc also arranged for the erection of Lutyens' tablet to the memory of Raymond Asquith in Amiens Cathedral. Lutyens travelled with Lady Horner and Katharine Asquith to France in the 1920s to view the tablets commemorating Edward and Raymond.)

Alfred Munnings was a painter specialising in horses. He volunteered for military service at the outbreak of war but was deemed unfit due to lack of sight in one eye. He volunteered to tend to army horses and was later recruited as a civilian war artist attached to Canadian cavalry. In 1919, he was beginning to move into sculpture. The Horner memorial was his first public work of sculpture, for which Lutyens commissioned him based on a pre-existing friendship. The work led to several further commissions for equine statues, including from the Jockey Club for a sculpture of the racehorse Brown Jack at Epsom Downs Racecourse. Munnings produced two models in clay for review by Lady Horner; he worked from photographs provided by Lady Horner and a live model in producing the statue. At one point, Munnings was so dissatisfied with the statue's head that he cut it off and re-cast it from scratch.

== Design and history ==
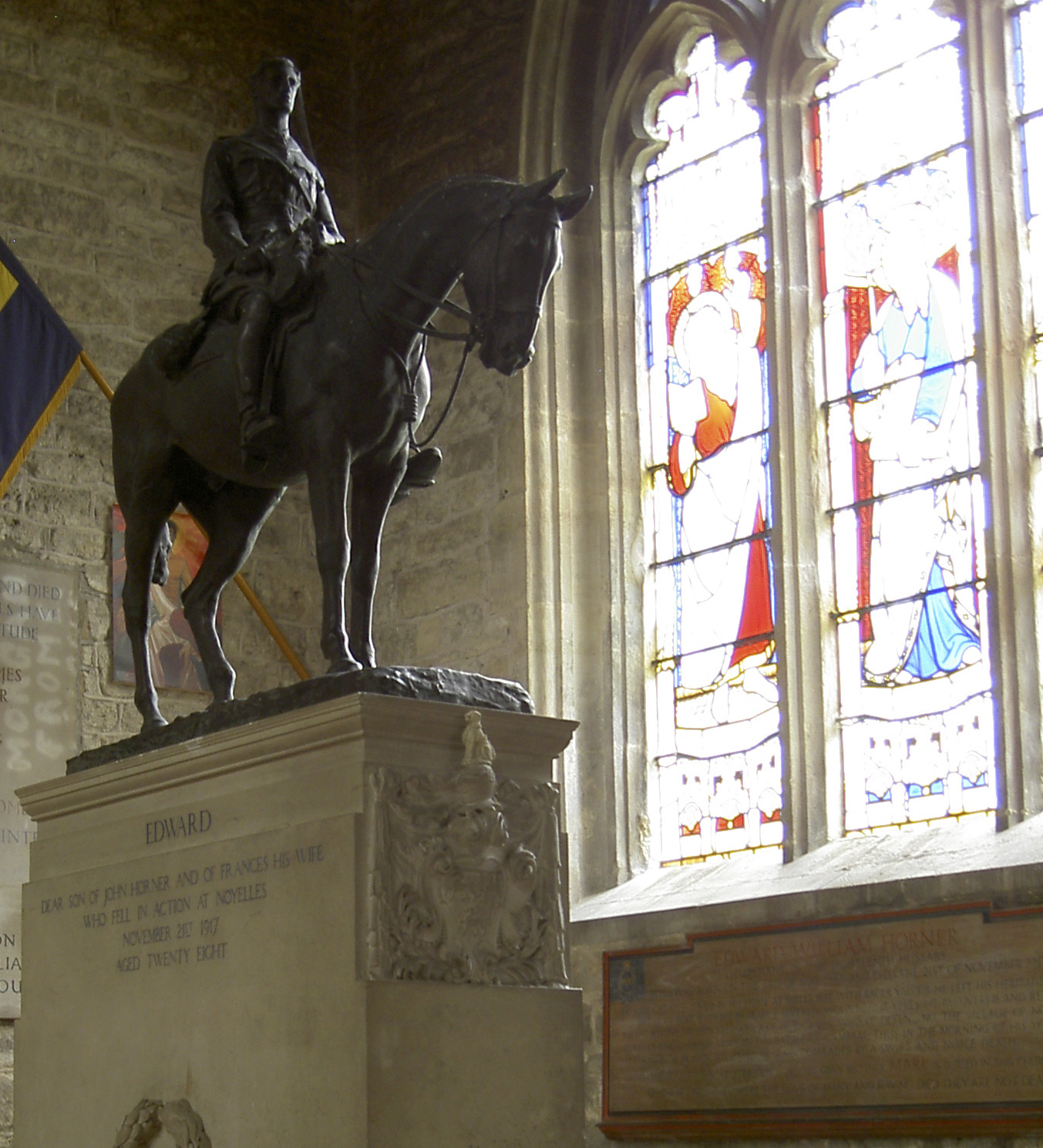
Both the statue (left) and the associated wooden memorial board (lower right) were moved from the family chapel to the west end of the church's north aisle

The memorial stands inside St Andrew's Church in Mells. The Horner family had a long association with the church, which shares a wall with the manor house. The family has its own chapel (formerly the Lady Chapel) in the church which contains the tombs of several family members. At the end of the nineteenth century, the Horners funded extensive restoration work to the building. The memorial is a bronze equestrian statue, sculpted by Munnings, featuring Edward Horner as a young cavalry officer, bare-headed and seated on horseback with his sword and helmet attached to the saddle. The statue originally faced a stained-glass window featuring a Madonna and Child, creating the image of Horner riding towards the light. It stands on a Portland stone plinth designed by Lutyens, reminiscent of his Cenotaph and described by Lutyens' biographer Jane Ridley as "deceptively simple". The temporary memorial cross, which originally marked Horner's grave in France, inscribed SACRED TO THE MEMORY OF LIEUT. E. W. HORNER 18TH Q.M.O. HUSSARS / DIED OF WOUNDS RECEIVED IN ACTION NOV 21ST 1917", is mounted on the rear of the plinth while the Horner family's coat of arms is carved in relief on the front. The south (left) side bears the inscription EDWARD / DEAR SON OF JOHN HORNER AND FRANCES HIS WIFE WHO FELL IN ACTION AT NOYELLES NOV 21 1917 AGED TWENTY EIGHT, while the north (right) side reads HE HATH OUTSOARED THE SHADOW OF OUR NIGHT, from Percy Bysshe Shelley's Adonaïs (1821), an elegy for John Keats.

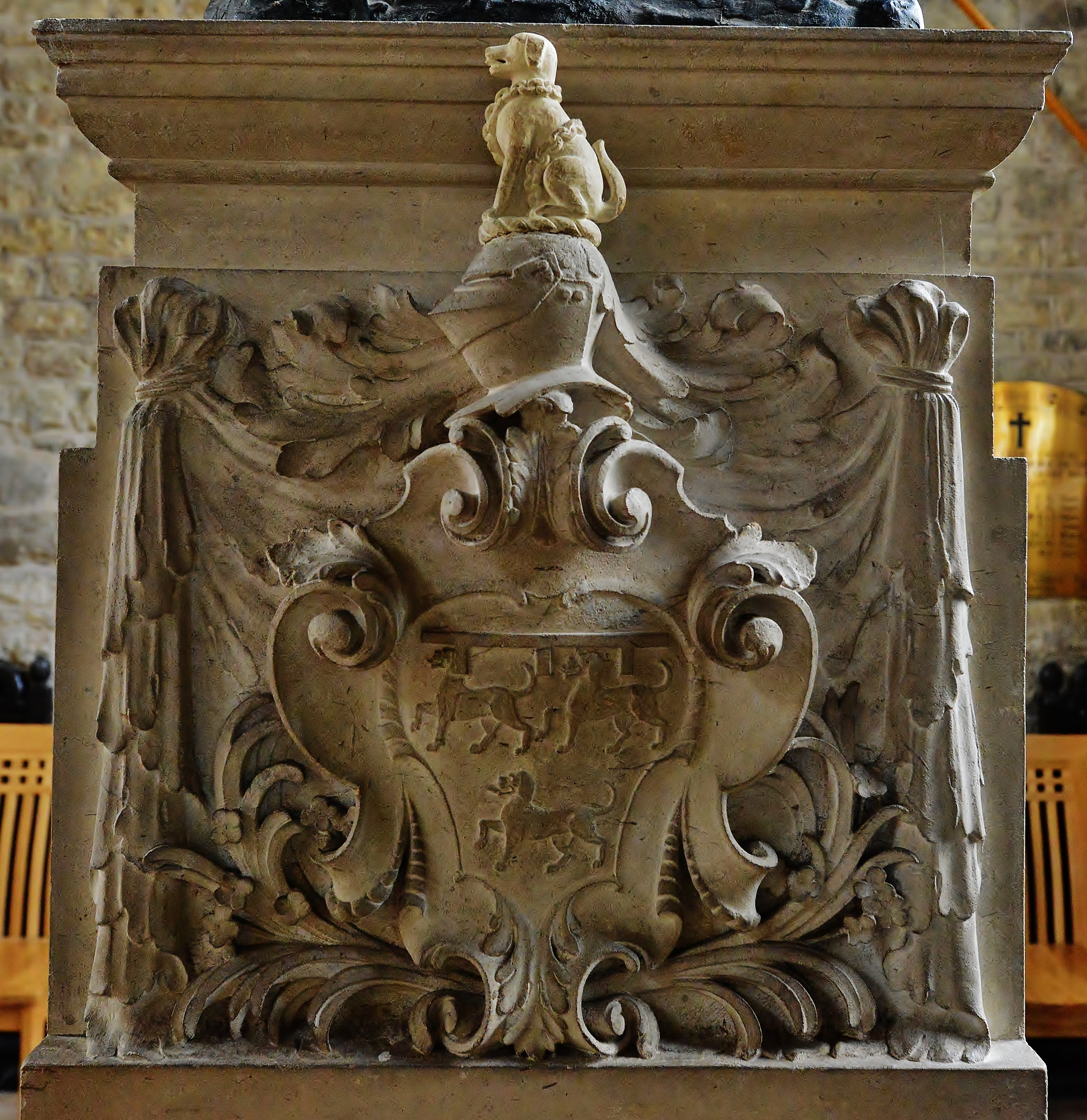
Carved coat-of-arms of the Horner family, on the east end of the memorial

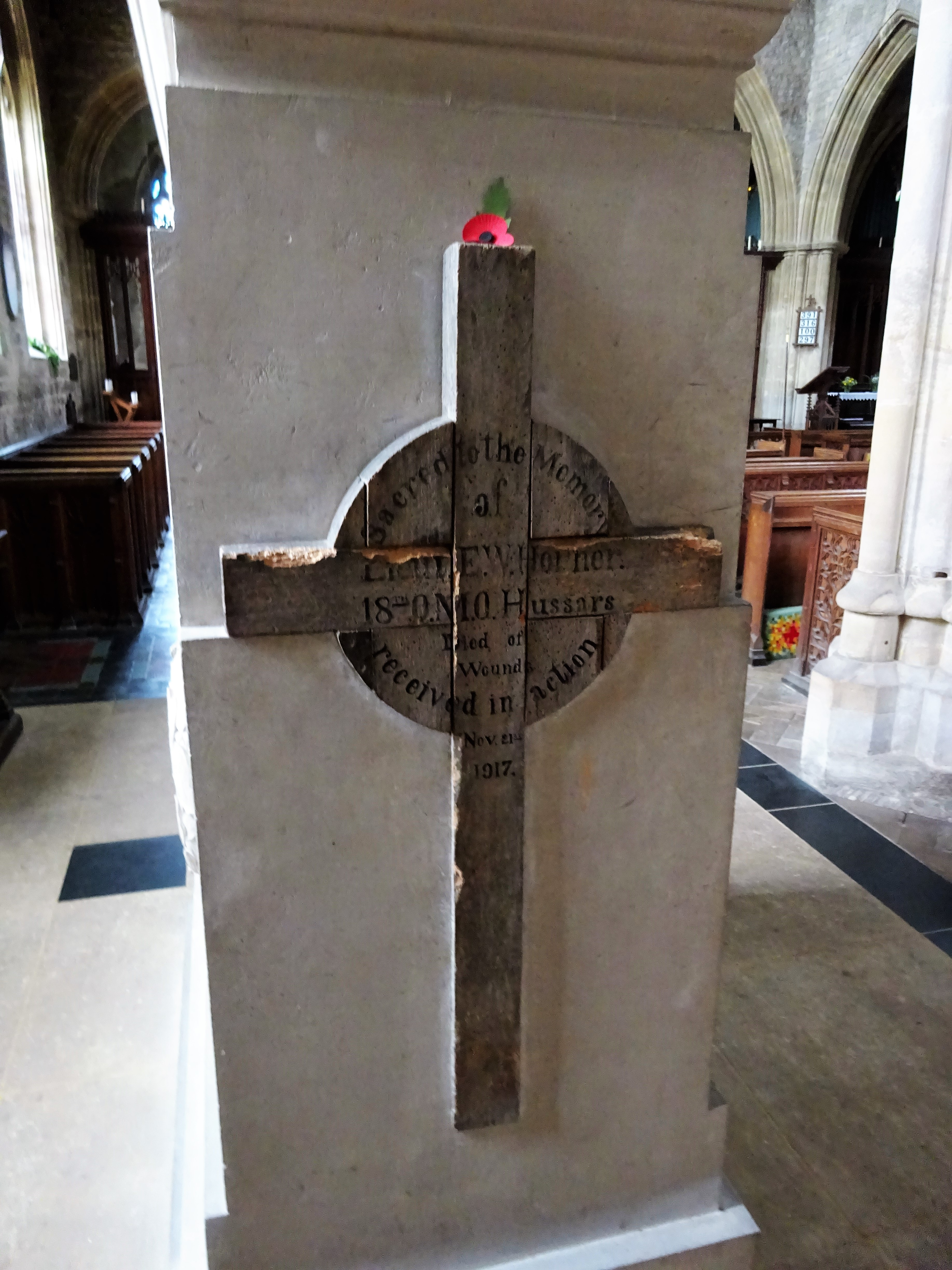
Wooden cross from Horner's grave in France, on the west end of the memorial

According to Colin Amery, who chaired an exhibition of Lutyens' work in the 1980s, "some of [Lutyens'] finest memorials and tombs" are to be found in Mells, and Edward Horner's memorial is one of "Lutyens' best and most moving tributes to the waste of life in the Great War". In his public war memorials (particularly the Cenotaph and the various memorials based on it), Lutyens often used abstract and ecumenical designs, feeling that a different form of architecture was needed to convey the sense of sorrow at the enormous loss of life. Where he was commissioned to commemorate an individual, however, Lutyens was more open to conventional imagery, such as a statue of an officer. According to Tim Skelton, author of Lutyens and the Great War (2008), the Horner statue is "widely considered to be one of the most moving of personal memorials to the [First World War]". Lutyens' original design for Horner's memorial included pillars rising from the plinth to enclose the statue in a mausoleum, but this part of the proposal was not implemented. Munnings' mould for the statue is on display at the Munnings Art Museum, in his former home and studio in Dedham in Essex.

The statue was installed in 1920. It cost over £1,000 and was by far the largest and most elaborate of the several war-related monuments in Mells. Frances Horner initially hoped for it to stand underneath the church's bell tower, but the suggestion prompted objections from villagers and the churchwardens, who were hesitant about having it in the church at all. Thus it was placed in the Horner chapel, on the north side of the chancel. In 2007 it was moved to the west end of the north aisle, as the church trustees wished to create space to allow more flexible use of the church.

== See also ==
- World War I memorials
- List of equestrian statues in the United Kingdom
