= Frances Horner =

Frances Horner OBE JP
- Lady Horner in the 1900s, by W. & D. Downey
- Born: Frances Jane Graham; 28 March 1854; Kensington, London, England
- Died: 1 March 1940 (aged 85); Mells, Somerset, England
- Occupations: Hostess, socialite
- Spouse: Sir John Horner (m. 1883; died 1927)
- Children: 4; including Katharine and Edward
- Parent(s): William Graham; Jane Catherine Loundes

Frances Jane Horner, Lady Horner OBE JP (née Graham; 28 March 1854 – 1 March 1940) was a British hostess, member of the Souls social group, and a patron of the arts. She was depicted several times by Edward Burne-Jones, and commissioned works by Edwin Lutyens, Eric Gill, and William Nicholson. She was the impetus for Norah Lindsay beginning a paid career as a garden designer as her garden at Mells Manor was designed by Lindsay.

== Early life ==
She was the sixth child and fourth daughter of William Graham (1817–1885) and Jane Catherine (née Lowndes; 1819/20–1899). Her father became the head of the family business which imported dry goods from India and Graham's port from Portugal. He served as the Liberal MP for Glasgow from 1865 to 1874.

Both of her older brothers died young in 1872: Rutherford of diphtheria aged 23 and William of an accidental morphine overdose aged 17. Her younger sister Agnes married Herbert Jekyll, a younger brother of the garden designer Gertrude Jekyll.

She was educated at home by governesses, at Langley Hall near Manchester and later at 54 Lowndes Square in London. Her father's background in "trade" limited her opportunities in London society, but according to the Oxford Dictionary of National Biography, she was one of the first young unmarried women in London to entertain her own guests.

Through her father's patronage of the Pre-Raphaelite Brotherhood, she became known to the artists Dante Gabriel Rossetti and Edward Burne-Jones. Although married, Burne-Jones became besotted with Frances, and painted her likeness in several works. In 1869, when Frances was 15, he drew her as "The Lady of the Window" in the Vita Nuova. She was included in The Golden Stairs in 1880, carrying cymbals at the bottom of the stairs. She has been described as one of the most important women in his life, after his wife, his daughter and his mistress Maria Zambaco.

== Family ==
In 1883, she married the barrister John Francis Fortescue Horner (1842–1927). His family owned Mells Manor and Mells Park near Frome in Somerset. Her husband served as a Justice of the Peace, a Deputy Lieutenant, and became the latest in a long line of Horners to serve as High Sheriff of Somerset in 1885. With Stafford Howard, he was a Commissioners of Woods, Forests and Land Revenues from 1895 to 1907, charged with the management of Crown lands. She became Lady Horner when her husband became a Knight Commander of the Royal Victorian Order (KCVO) in 1907.

They had four children:

- Cicely Margaret Horner (1883–1972); in 1908, she married George Lambton, fifth son of George Lambton, 2nd Earl of Durham; their children included Ann Lambton
- Katharine Frances Horner (9 September 1885 – 9 July 1976); in 1907, she married the barrister Raymond Asquith (1878–1916), the son of the politician H. H. Asquith who became British Prime Minister in 1908; Raymond Asquith was killed in the Battle of Flers–Courcelette in the First World War; their son Julian succeeded his grandfather as 2nd Earl of Oxford and Asquith
- Edward William Horner (3 May 1888 – 21 November 1917); he was killed at Noyelles during the Battle of Cambrai in the First World War; he was a member of The Coterie with his brother-in-law Raymond Asquith.
- Mark George Horner (1891–1908); died of scarlet fever aged 16.

In 1900 Frances Horner, her husband and young family left Mells Park for the nearby and more manageable Manor House. The house at Mells Park was destroyed by a catastrophic fire in October 1917. Lutyens designed the replacement for the banker and politician Reginald McKenna and his wife Pamela (née Jekyll). Pamela was her niece, the daughter of Herbert Jekyll and her sister Agnes.

== Patronage ==
Horner became a hostess at Mells, entertaining their circle of artists and intellectuals, the Souls, which included Edwin Lutyens, H. H. Asquith and R. B. Haldane. Lady Paget called her the "High Priestess" of the Souls.

She continued her father's role as friend and patron of Burne-Jones. She undertook elaborate embroidery work: an example designed by Burne-Jones, L'Amor che mouve il Sole e Faltre Stelle ("The love that moves the sun and other stars", a quotation from Dante's Divine Comedy, Paradiso, Canto XXXIII, line 145) hangs in St Andrew's Church, Mells. She also commissioned for the church a stained glass window by William Nicholson, commemorating her husband Sir John Horner; and a large memorial to her elder son, Edward, installed in 1920, comprising a bronze equestrian statue by Alfred Munnings on a plinth by Lutyens, with lettering by Eric Gill.

The village of Mells contains other works commissioned by Horner, including two shelters designed by Lutyens in memory of her son Mark Horner, both with lettering by Gill. The Mells War Memorial, also by Lutyens, was unveiled in 1921.

== Later life ==
She served as a Justice of the Peace, and she was appointed as an Officer of the Order of the British Empire in 1919. She continued to live in Mells after her husband's death in 1927, living with her widowed daughter Katharine Asquith. She published memoirs, Time Remembered, in 1933. In 1939, she was living at Mells with her widowed daughter Katharine Asquith and grandchildren, Julian Asquith, 2nd Earl of Oxford and Asquith and Lady Helen Asquith, as well as the writer Evelyn Waugh and his wife, Laura.

The house is now the home of Raymond Asquith, 3rd Earl of Oxford and Asquith.

== Sources ==
- Andrew Gailey, Portrait of a Muse: Frances Graham, Edward Burne-Jones and the Pre-Raphaelite Dream (Wilmington Square Books, 2020)
- K. D. Reynolds, ‘Horner, Frances Jane, Lady Horner (1854/5–1940)’, Oxford Dictionary of National Biography, Oxford University Press, 2004
- Frances Jane Horner (née Graham), Lady Horner, National Portrait Gallery
- ‘A love that lasted all his life’: Burne-Jones, Frances Graham and Pre-Raphaelite heartache, Christie's, 11 July 2016
- L'Amor che mouve il Sole e Faltre Stelle, Frances Jane Horner (née Graham), Lady Horner
- Visit to Mells and Kilmersdon, Somerset, The Lutyens Trust
- The Plantagenet Roll of the Blood Royal: The Mortimer-Percy Volume, by The Marquis of Ruvigny and Ranieval
