= John Francis Fortescue Horner =

British barrister

Sir John Horner KCVO
- Born: John Francis Fortescue Horner; 28 December 1842; Mells, Somerset, England
- Died: 21 March 1927 (aged 84); Mells, Somerset, England
- Education: Eton College
- Alma mater: Balliol College, Oxford
- Occupation: Barrister
- Spouse: Frances Graham (m. 1883)
- Parent(s): Rev. John Stuart Hippisley Horner; Sophia Gertrude Dickinson
- Relatives: William Dickinson (grandfather); Ann Lambton (granddaughter); Julian Asquith, 2nd Earl of Oxford and Asquith (grandson)

Sir John Francis Fortescue Horner, KCVO (28 December 1842 – 21 March 1927) was a British barrister. His family had lived at Mells Manor for generations and many have memorials in St Andrew's Church, Mells. He and his family became associated with The Souls, a social group which included many of the most distinguished English politicians and intellectuals of the Victorian era.

Horner became Commissioner of Woods, Forests and Land Revenues and became a Knight Commander of the Royal Victorian Order for his service.

== Early life ==
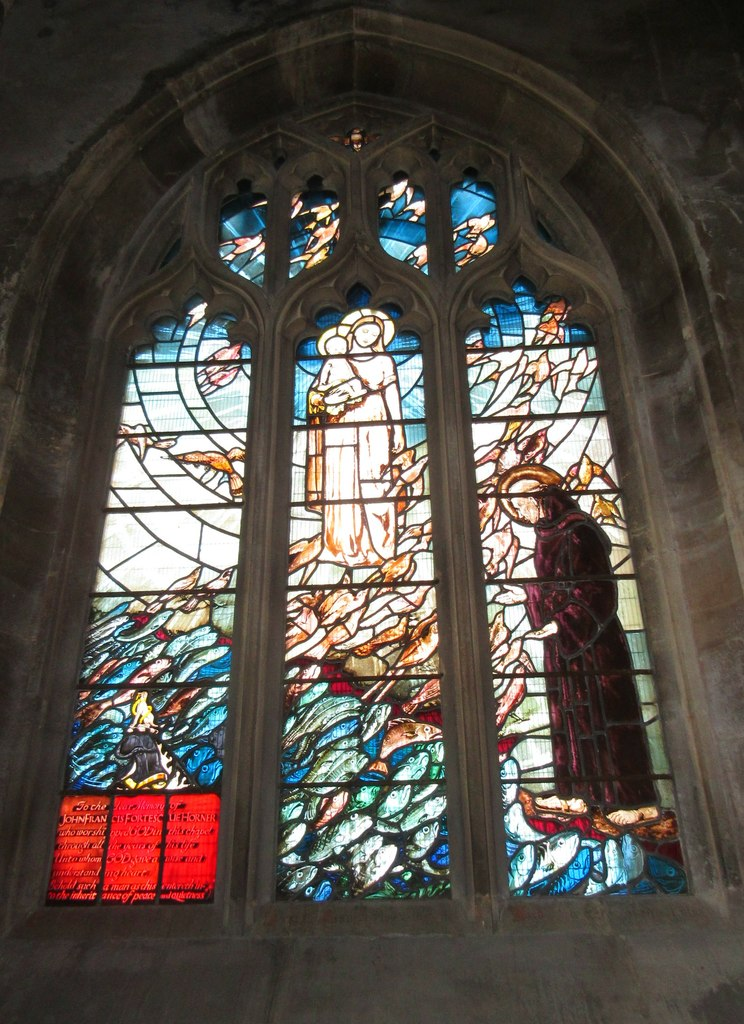
Memorial window to John Francis Fortescue Horner in St Andrew's Church, Mells

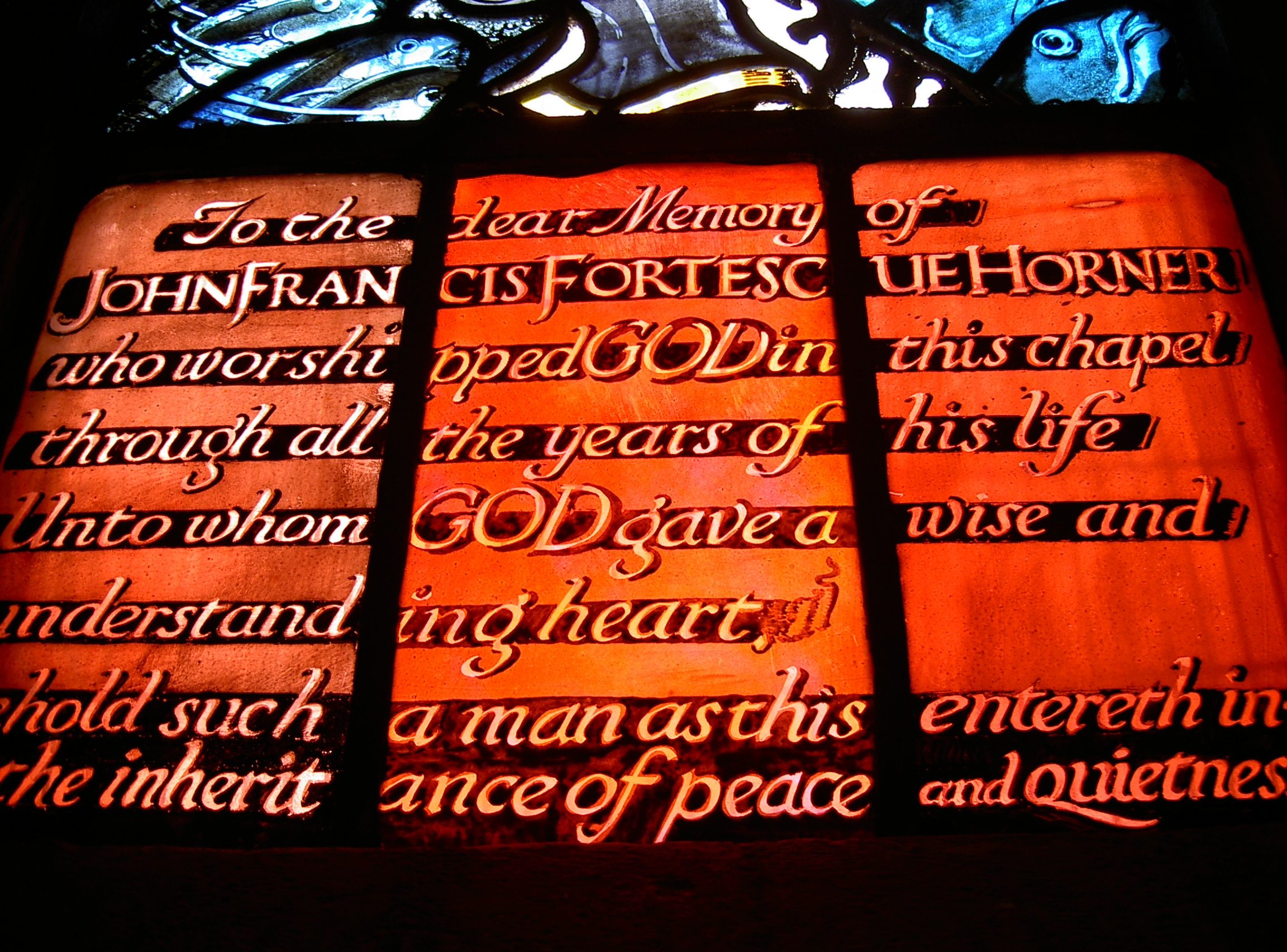
Detail of memorial window

He was the son of the Rev. John Stuart Hippisley Horner (1810–1874) and his wife Sophia Gertrude Dickinson (1814–1902), daughter of William Dickinson MP.

Horner's family were descended from the "Little Jack Horner" referred to in the children's nursery rhyme derived from an earlier jingle which was changed from the original to justify the use of the Horner name. The poem since has been associated with acts of opportunism. The family took possession of Mells Manor in Mells (near Frome), Somerset, at the Dissolution of the Monasteries in the 16th century.

He went to Eton College in 1855, and matriculated at Balliol College, Oxford in 1861, graduating B.A. in 1866, M.A. in 1873.

== Career ==
He was called to the bar at the Inner Temple in 1868. Horner worked as a barrister in London and served as Commissioner of Woods, Forests and Land Revenues from 1895, for which he was knighted as a Knight Commander of the Royal Victorian Order (KCVO) in 1907.

=== Cricketer ===
A keen cricketer, Horner made five appearances in first-class cricket between 1866 and 1873, playing for Southgate, the Marylebone Cricket Club and the Gentlemen of England.

== Personal life ==
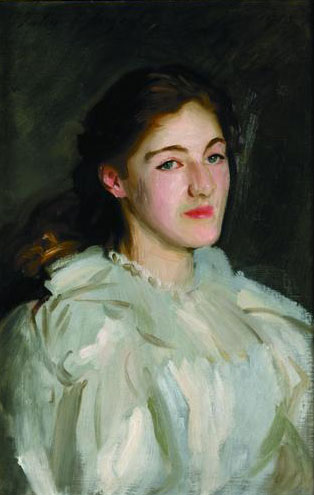
His eldest daughter, Cicely, by John Singer Sargent, c. 1889.

On 18 January 1883, Horner was married to Frances Graham, daughter of William Graham. Through her, he became associated with the social group known as The Souls, several of whom were frequent visitors to Mells, including the Liberal MP H. H. Asquith, who later became prime minister. Together, Frances and John were the parents of four children:

- Cicely Margaret Horner (1883–1972), who married the Hon. George Lambton, the fifth son of George Lambton, 2nd Earl of Durham, and a grandson of James Hamilton, 1st Duke of Abercorn.
- Katharine Frances Horner (1885–1976), who married Raymond Asquith, a son of British prime minister H. H. Asquith. Raymond was killed in the First World War.
- Edward William Horner (1888–1917), who was educated at Eton and Balliol before being called to the bar and beginning a pupilage as a barrister; he joined the British Army at the outbreak of the First World War and was killed at the Battle of Cambrai in France in 1917.
- Mark George Horner (1891–1908), who died of scarlet fever in 1908 at the age of 16.

His son, Edward, and son-in-law, Raymond, who both died in World War I, are commemorated by memorials by Sir Edwin Lutyens in St Andrew's Church, Mells.

Horner died on 21 March 1927 and was buried at St Andrew Churchyard in Mells. He was survived by his wife and daughter Katharine who continued to live in Mells Manor. Katharine inherited the manor upon her mother's death in 1940.

=== Descendants ===
Through his eldest daughter Cicely, he was a grandfather of Ann Lambton, a historian and expert on medieval and early modern Persian history, Persian language, Islamic political theory, and Persian social organisation.

Through his second daughter Katharine, he was a grandfather of Lady Helen Asquith OBE, who did not marry but was a teacher and school inspector, Lady Perdita Asquith, who married William Jolliffe, 4th Baron Hylton and had three children (including the actress Anna Chancellor), and Julian Asquith, 2nd Earl of Oxford and Asquith, who married Anne Palairet and had five children (including Raymond Asquith, 3rd Earl of Oxford and Asquith).
