= Raymond Jolliffe, 5th Baron Hylton =

British Crossbench peer and landowner

The Right Honourable The Lord Hylton ARICS DL
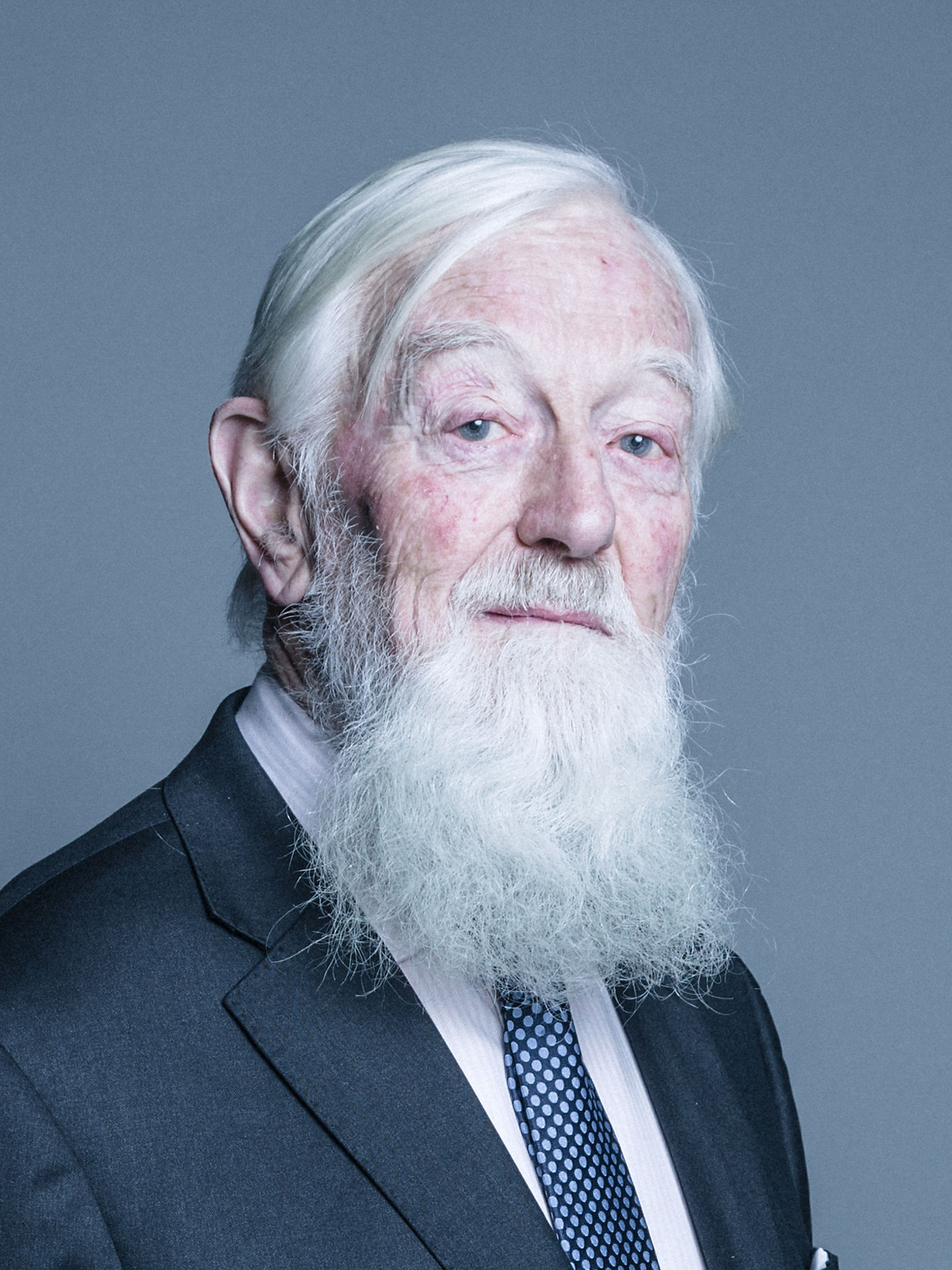
- Official portrait, 2018

Member of the House of Lords
- Lord Temporal
- Hereditary peerage 9 June 1968 – 11 November 1999
- Preceded by: The 4th Baron Hylton
- Succeeded by: Seat abolished
- Elected Hereditary Peer; 11 November 1999 – 27 July 2023
- Election: 1999
- Preceded by: Seat established
- Succeeded by: The 28th Baron de Clifford

Personal details
- Born: Raymond Jolliffe; 13 June 1932 (age 94)
- Party: Crossbench
- Education: Eton College; Trinity College, Oxford

Raymond Hervey Jolliffe, 5th Baron Hylton, ARICS, DL (born 13 June 1932), is a British peer and landowner. He was one of 92 hereditary peers elected to remain in the House of Lords after the passing of the House of Lords Act 1999, sitting as a crossbencher. He was the longest-serving Crossbench member of the House of Lords at the time of his retirement.

== Early life ==
He is the elder son of the 4th Baron Hylton and Lady Perdita Rose Mary Asquith (1910–1996; daughter of Katharine and Raymond Asquith, and sister of Julian Asquith, 2nd Earl of Oxford and Asquith, and thus the granddaughter of former Prime Minister H. H. Asquith). He was educated at Eton College in Berkshire and Trinity College, Oxford, where he graduated with a Master of Arts in History in 1955. In 1951 and 1952, he served in the Coldstream Guards, and in 1967, he succeeded to his father's title.

== Career ==
Jolliffe was Assistant Private Secretary to the Governor General of Canada between 1960 and 1962. Since 1962, he was member of the Abbeyfield Society, the Catholic Housing Aid Society, the London Housing Aid Centre, the National Federation of Housing Associations, Mencap, the Foundation for Alternatives, the Hugh of Witham Foundation, and the Action around Bethlehem Children with Disability (ABCD). He has worked for Age Concern, L'Arche Ltd as well as the Mendip Wansdyke Local Enterprise Group. Since 1988, he is further president of the Northern Ireland Association for Care and Resettlement of Offenders. He is a member of the Housing Associations Charitable Trust and of Forward Thinking.

As a member of the House of Lords, he worked to promote peace talks in the Middle East and Ireland amongst other work. He once stated that he regretted "very much that the fine old English and French word ‘gay’ has, in my lifetime, been appropriated by a small but vocal minority of the population. The result is that it can no longer be used in its original and rather delightful meaning."

== Philanthropy ==
Hylton is a trustee of the Acorn Christian Healing Trust and vice-chairman of Partners in Hope. From 1993 to 2001, he was chairman of the St Francis and St Sergius Trust Fund. He is also a trustee and governor of the Ammerdown Study Centre at Ammerdown House, Kilmersdon, near Bath, which remains the family seat. In 1960 he was appointed an Associate of Royal Institution of Chartered Surveyors and in 1994, he received an honorary doctorate of the University of Southampton.

== Personal life ==
Since 1966, he has been married to Joanna de Bertodano, granddaughter of the 6th Earl of Mexborough. They have a daughter and four sons:

- Hon. William Henry Martin Jolliffe (1 April 1967), heir apparent
- Hon. Andrew Thomas Peter Jolliffe (29 June 1969 – 24 October 2022)
- Hon. Alexander John Charles Martin Jolliffe (10 February 1973)
- Hon. Emily Sylvia Rose Elizabeth Jolliffe (14 March 1975)
- Hon. John Edward Arthur Jolliffe (7 December 1977)

Peerage of the United Kingdom
Preceded by William Hylton	Baron Hylton; 1967–present Member of the House of Lords (1968–1999)	Incumbent; Heir apparent: Hon. William Henry Martin Jolliffe
Parliament of the United Kingdom
New office created by the House of Lords Act 1999	Elected hereditary peer to the House of Lords under the House of Lords Act 1999; 1999–2023	Succeeded by The Lord de Clifford
