= Raymond Asquith =

English barrister (1878-1916)

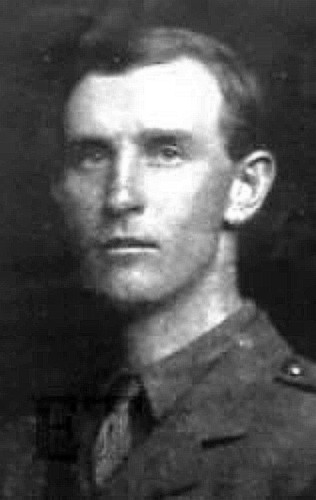
- Born: 6 November 1878; Hampstead, London, England
- Died: 15 September 1916 (aged 37) near Ginchy, France
- Cause of death: Killed in action
- Resting place: CWGC Guillemont Road Cemetery
- Education: Winchester College; Balliol College, Oxford
- Occupation: Lawyer
- Spouse: Katharine Frances Horner
- Children: 3, including: Julian Asquith, 2nd Earl of Oxford and Asquith
- Parents: H. H. Asquith; Helen Melland
- Military career
- Allegiance: United Kingdom
- Branch: British Army
- Service years: 1915–1916
- Rank: Lieutenant
- Units: 3rd Battalion, Grenadier Guards
- Conflicts: First World War: Battle of the Somme; Battle of Flers-Courcelette †

Raymond Herbert Asquith (6 November 1878 – 15 September 1916) was an English barrister and eldest son of British prime minister H. H. Asquith. A distinguished Oxford scholar, he was a member of the fashionable group of intellectuals known as the Coterie, which included Lady Diana Manners (with whom he had a long flirtatious relationship), Patrick Shaw-Stewart, Charles Lister, Hugo "Ego" Charteris, Julian Grenfell and Edward Horner. The Coterie were notable for their unconventional lifestyles and lavish hospitality. Like several of them, Asquith was killed in action in the First World War during his father's term in office.

== Career and honours ==
Asquith was the eldest son of British prime minister H. H. Asquith and his first wife, Helen Kelsall Melland.

He was educated at Winchester, from where he won a scholarship to Balliol in 1896, taking with him a reputation for brilliance. He won the Ireland, Derby, and Craven scholarships, and graduated with first-class honours. Elected a fellow of All Souls in 1902, he received the Eldon Law Scholarship, and was called to the bar in 1904. The tall, handsome Asquith was a member of the Coterie, a group of Edwardian socialites and intellectuals.

Asquith was junior counsel in the North Atlantic Fisheries Arbitration and represented the Board of Trade during the British inquiry into the sinking of RMS Titanic. He was considered a putative Liberal candidate for Derby but his rise was interrupted by the outbreak of the First World War. He was initially commissioned, on 17 December 1914, as a second lieutenant into the 16th (County of London) Battalion, London Regiment (Queen's Westminster Rifles). He was transferred to the 3rd Battalion, Grenadier Guards on 14 August 1915, and assigned as a staff officer, but he requested to be returned to active duty with his battalion, a request granted before the Battle of the Somme.

While leading the first half of 4 Company in an attack near Ginchy on 15 September 1916, at the Battle of Flers-Courcelette, he was shot in the chest at 4.30 pm but famously lit a cigarette to hide the seriousness of his injuries so that his men would continue the attack. He died whilst being carried back to British lines. His body was buried at Guillemont in the CWGC Guillemont Road Cemetery (Plot I. Row B. Grave 3.). The grave's headstone is inscribed: 'Small time but in that small most greatly lived this star of England', a concluding line from Shakespeare's Henry V.

In his 1928 obituary tribute to H.H. Asquith, Winston Churchill summarised Asquith's last moments:

It seemed quite easy for Raymond Asquith, when the time came, to face death and to die. When I saw him at the Front he seemed to move through the cold, squalor and peril of the winter trenches as if he were above and immune from the common ills of the flesh, a being clad in polished armour, entirely undisturbed, presumably invulnerable. The War which found the measure of so many, never got to the bottom of him, and when the Grenadiers strode into the crash and thunder of the Somme, he went to his fate cool, poised, resolute, matter of fact, debonair. And well we know that his father, then bearing the supreme burden of the State, would proudly have marched at his side.

The writer John Buchan devoted several pages of his autobiography Memory Hold-the-Door to his friendship with Asquith. He noted of Raymond's character:

I do not think he could ever have been called popular. He was immensely admired, but he did not lay himself out to acquire popularity, and in the ordinary man he inspired awe rather than liking. His courtesy was without warmth, he was apt to be intolerant of mediocrity, and he had no desire for facile acquaintanceships. Also – let it be admitted – there were times when he was almost inhuman. He would destroy some piece of honest sentiment with a jest, and he had no respect for the sacred places of dull men. There was always a touch of scorn in him for obvious emotions, obvious creeds, and all the accumulated lumber of prosaic humanity. That was a defect of his great qualities. He kept himself for his friends and refused to bother about the world. But as such who were to his friendship he would deny nothing. I have never known a friend more considerate, and tender, and painstaking, and unfalteringly loyal. It was the relation of all others in life for which he had been born with a peculiar genius.

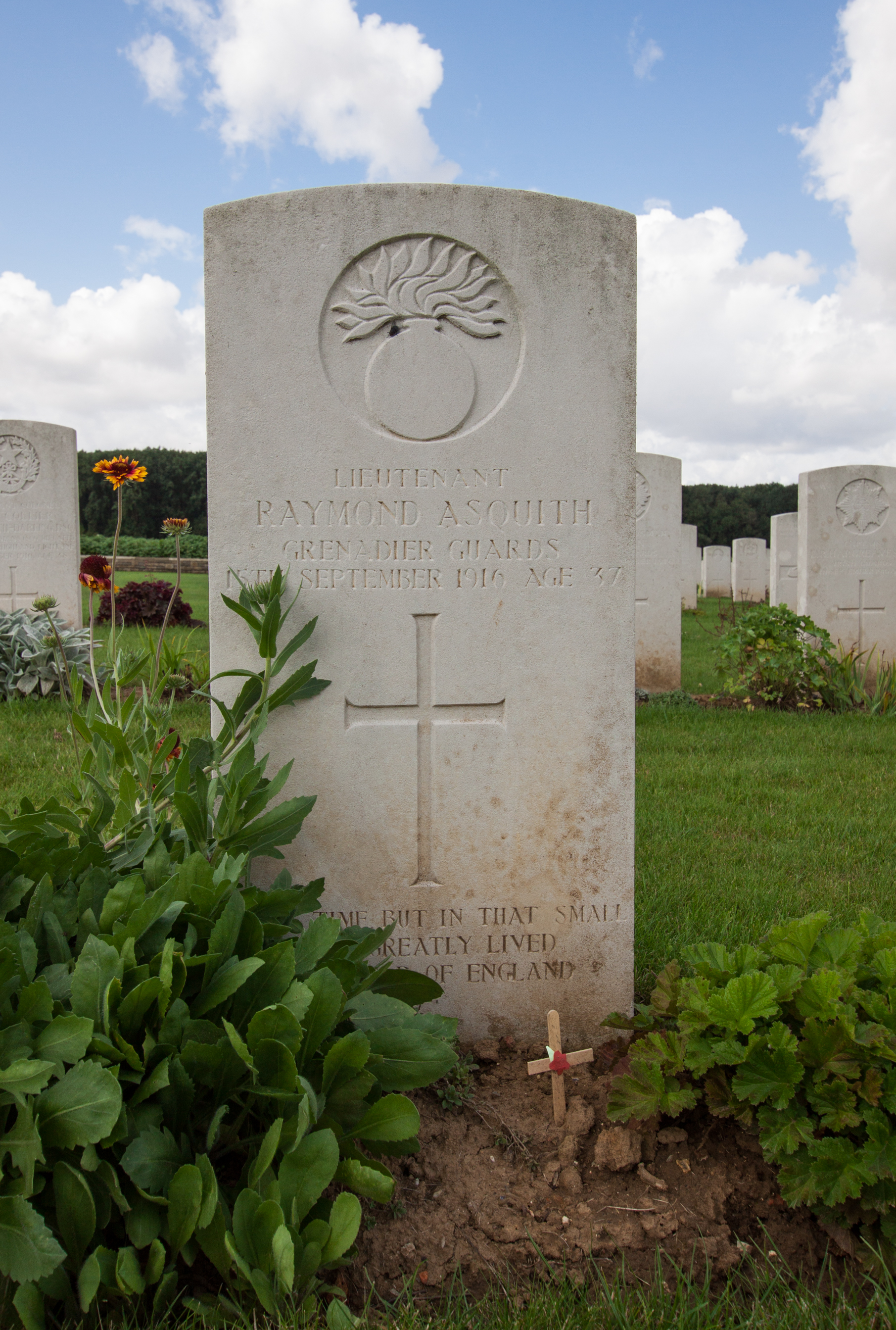
Asquith's grave in Guillemont Road Cemetery

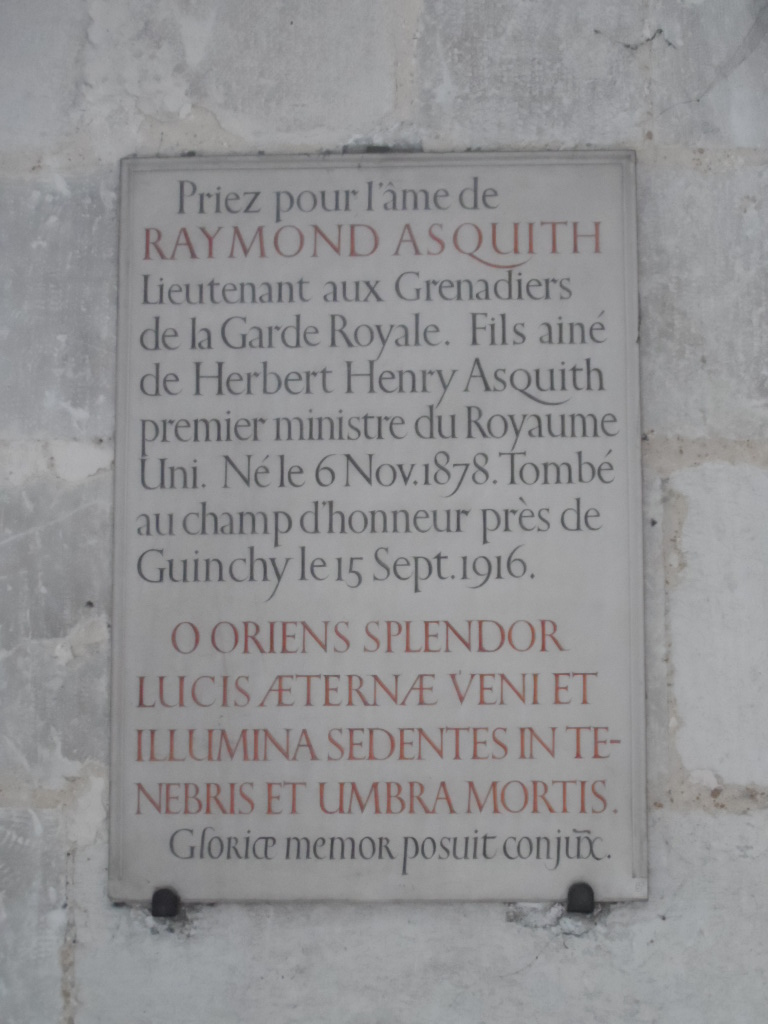
Memorial tablet in Amiens Cathedral

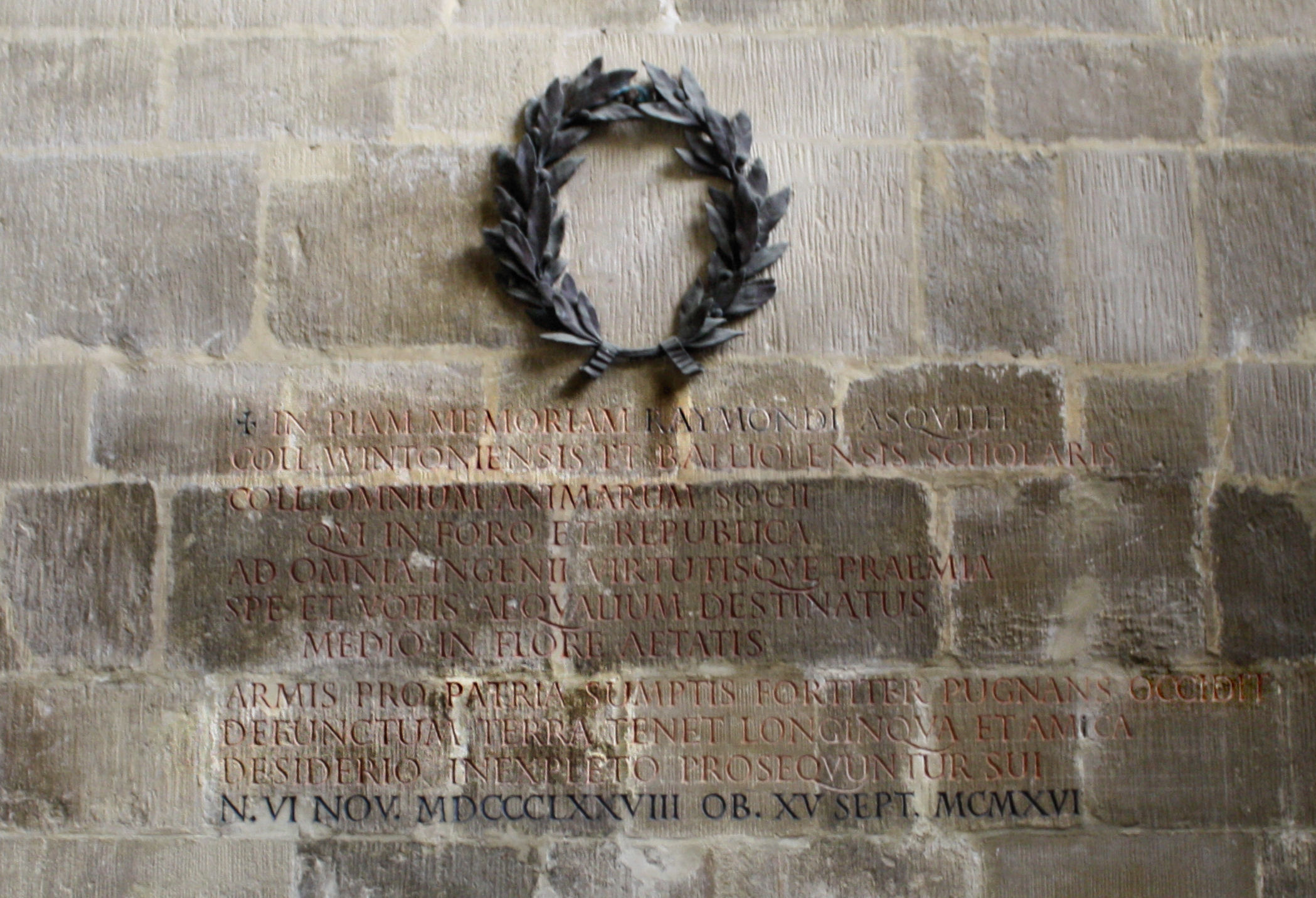
Memorial in St Andrew's Church in Mells

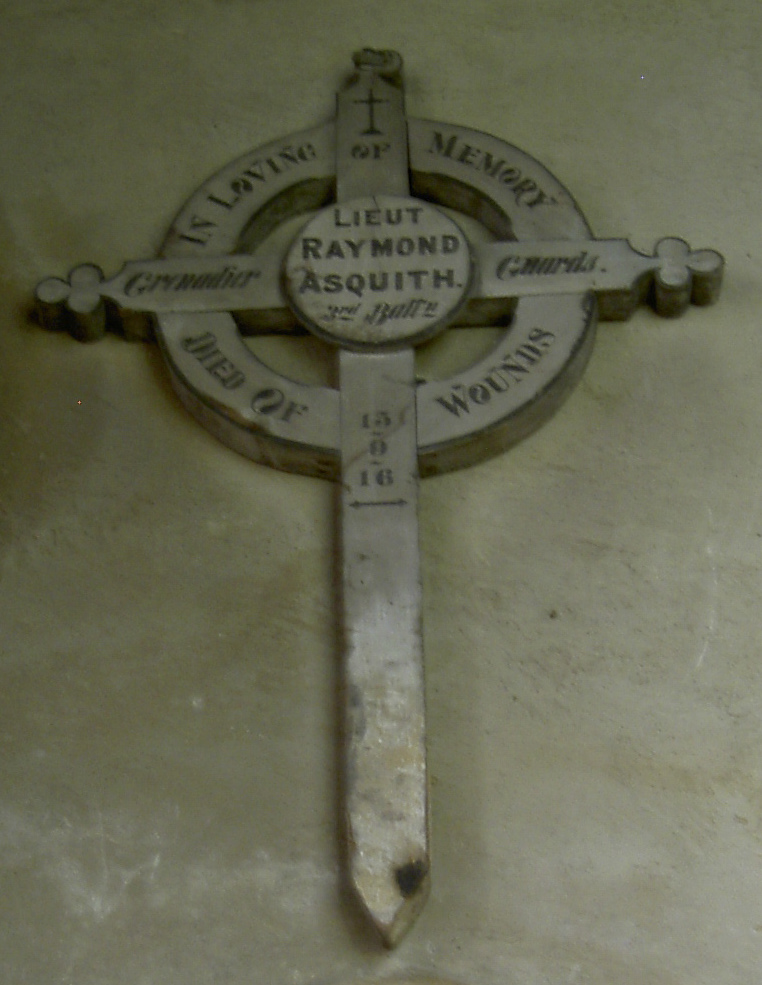
Battlefield cross for Asquith, in St Andrew's Church in Mells

Buchan's analysis of Asquith's personality is endorsed by several other contemporaries who found him clever but rather arrogant, cold, cynical and aloof.

=== Memorials ===
A memorial tablet to Asquith's memory was erected in Amiens Cathedral. The inscription, in French and Latin, states:

Priez pour l'âme de RAYMOND ASQUITH Lieutenant aux Grenadiers de la Garde Royale. Fils ainé de Herbert Henry Asquith premier ministre du Royaume Uni. Né le 6 Nov. 1878. Tombé au champ d'honneur près de Guinchy le 15 Sept. 1916. [Pray for the soul of RAYMOND ASQUITH Lieutenant of the Grenadiers of the Royal Guard. Eldest son of Herbert Henry Asquith, prime minister of the United Kingdom. Born Nov. 6 1878. Fell on the field of honour near Guinchy Sept. 15 1916.]

O ORIENS SPLENDOR LUCIS AETERNAE VENI ET ILLUMINA SEDENTES IN TENEBRIS ET UMBRA MORTIS. Gloriae memor posuit conjux. [O dawn of the east, brightness of light eternal, and sun of justice: come, and enlighten those who sit in darkness and in the shadow of death. Placed by his wife in glorious memory.]

He is also the subject of a memorial in St Andrew's Church near the family home in Mells in Somerset, and is listed on Mells War Memorial; both memorials were designed by Sir Edwin Lutyens, a friend of the Asquith family. The St Andrew's Church memorial wording is:

In piam memoriam Raymondi Asquith Coll. Wintoniensis et Balliolensis scholaris Coll. Omnium Animarum socii qui in foro et republica ad omnia ingenii virtutisque praemia spe et votis aequalium destinatus medio in flore aetatis armis pro patria sumptis fortiter pugnans occidit defunctum terra tenet longinqua et amica desiderio inexpleto prosequuntur sui
N. VI NOV. MDCCCLXXVIII OB. XV SEPT. MCMXVI

In English the text reads:

In loving memory of Raymond Asquith Scholar of Winchester College and Balliol College Fellow of All Souls College Who was destined by the hopes and desires of his contemporaries To win all the rewards of intellectual talent and virtue. In the middle of the flower of his life He took up arms for his native-land and died fighting bravely. A distant and friendly land holds him now he is dead. His family and friends mourn him with unrequited longing. Born on 6 November 1878, died on 15 September 1916.

Asquith and his wife Katharine are portrayed in Phoebe Traquair's apse mural in All Saints Church, at Thorney Hill, he also appears in William Rothenstein's unfinished mural "War Cartoon" located at the University of Southampton.

== Family ==
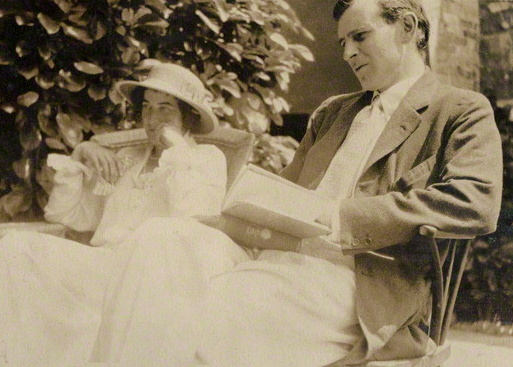
Raymond Asquith and his wife in 1913

Raymond Asquith was married on 25 July 1907 to Katharine Frances Horner, younger daughter of Sir John Francis Fortescue Horner, of Mells, Somerset, descended from Thomas Horner, the Tudor figure on whom the nursery rhyme 'Little Jack Horner' is sometimes said to be based. Her mother, Lady Horner (d. 1940), was Frances Jane Graham, elder daughter of William Graham, a rich merchant, passionate art collector, and Liberal member of parliament for Glasgow. Lady Horner was a notable hostess and patron of the arts, especially the Pre-Raphaelites and John Singer Sargent. The Horners had four children – Cicely (born 1883), Katharine (1885), Mark (who died in his teens), and Edward (1888).

Asquith and his wife had three children:

- Lady Helen Frances Asquith OBE (1908–2000), a school teacher and inspector who died unmarried
- Perdita Rose Mary Jolliffe, Baroness Hylton (nee Asquith) (1910–1996) who married the 4th Baron Hylton (d 1967)
- Julian Edward George Asquith, 2nd Earl of Oxford and Asquith, KCMG (1916–2011), nicknamed Trim, who was born a few months before his father's death on active service. The new baby was reputedly named "Trim" in honour of the Roman gourmand Trimalchio, after his father saw his newborn son for the first time while on leave from the war.

Asquith died nearly ten years before his father was raised to the House of Lords in 1925 as Earl of Oxford and Asquith. Katharine eventually inherited Mells Manor because her younger and only surviving brother, Edward Horner, was also killed in the war. He was buried in France, but his memorial in St Andrew's Church, Mells was designed by his mother's friend Edwin Lutyens, who was a patron of Monsignor Ronald Knox. Katharine converted to Roman Catholicism after being widowed and became a friend of Siegfried Sassoon, who also converted, following her example. She also remained in touch with Evelyn Waugh, another convert.

== Sources ==
- Oxford Dictionary of National Biography. K. D. Reynolds, 'Horner, Frances Jane, Lady Horner (1854/5–1940)’, first published September 2004, 580 words, with portrait illustration. Oxford DNB: Frances Horner (citation only), full article available via subscription only.
- Jolliffe, John (ed.) Raymond Asquith: Life and Letters (Collins, 1980)
