= Katharine Asquith =

English landowner, patron of the arts, and nurse

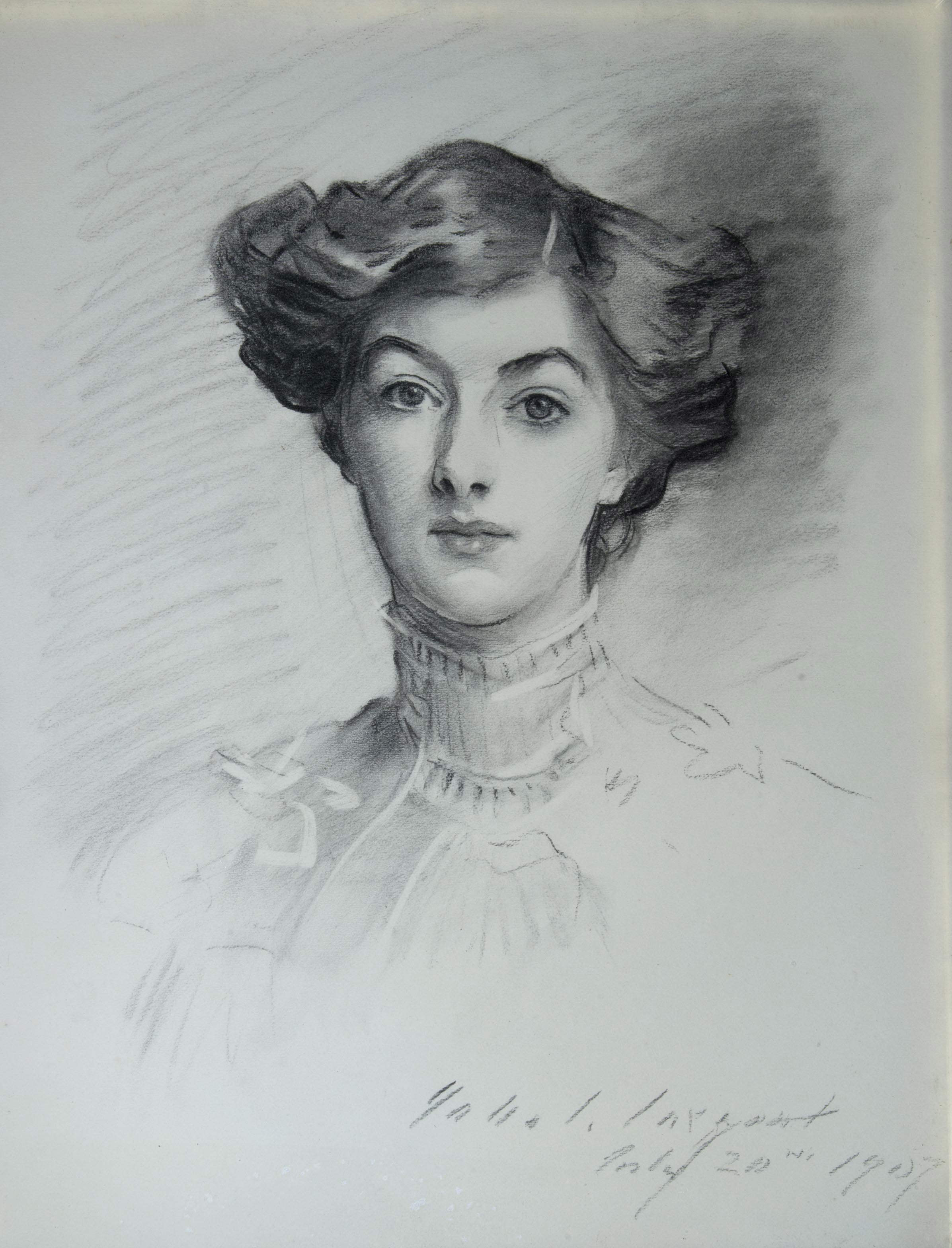
- Katharine Horner (later Asquith) by John Singer Sargent, 20 July 1907
- Born: Katharine Frances Horner; 9 September 1885; Mells Park, Somerset, England
- Died: 9 July 1976 (aged 90); Mells Manor, Somerset, England
- Occupation: Landowner
- Spouse: Raymond Asquith (m. 1907; died 1916)
- Children: 3; including Julian
- Parent(s): Sir John Horner; Frances Graham

Katharine Frances Asquith (née Horner; 9 September 1885 – 9 July 1976) was an English landowner and patron of the arts. During the First World War, she served as a Voluntary Aid Detachment nurse. She was the wife of Raymond Asquith and the daughter-in-law of wartime prime minister H. H. Asquith.

== Early life and family ==
Katharine Horner was the younger daughter of Frances (née Graham) and Sir John Horner. She was born at Mells Park, Somerset, the ancestral home of the Horners since the Reformation. Her parents were original members of the exclusive aristocratic social circle "The Souls." In addition to Katharine, her parents had three other children:

- Cicely Margaret (1883–1972), who married the Hon. George Lambton.
- Mark George (1891–1908), who died of scarlet fever.
- Edward William (1888–1917), who was killed at the Battle of Cambrai. An equestrian statue of Edward stands in St Andrew's Church, Mells.

Educated by governesses and travel, Katharine developed a love for poetry, philosophy and could read Greek. Cynthia Asquith described her as "tall, slender, starry-eyed, with a countenance of rare and changeful loveliness, [she] was a living poem. I have never seen any eyes like hers". Another friend, Blanche Stanley commented, "All girls — like all men — long to know you well because you are so beautiful but are puzzled how to do it because you are so uncommon and remote".

== Marriage ==
Katharine met her future husband, Raymond Asquith (1878–1916), a barrister and the eldest son of H. H. Asquith, in the summer of 1901 at Mells. Subsequent holidays with the Horners in Austria (1903), Venice (1904) and Ireland (1905) and a shared love of poetry brought the two closer together. Raymond wrote to her: "You know how I would like to give you the whole world, if it were mine, and the sun and moon and all the stars." Marriage, however, was not possible due to her parents' desire that Katharine see "a little more of the world and a few more potential husbands," and Raymond's inability to support a wife on his earnings from the law.

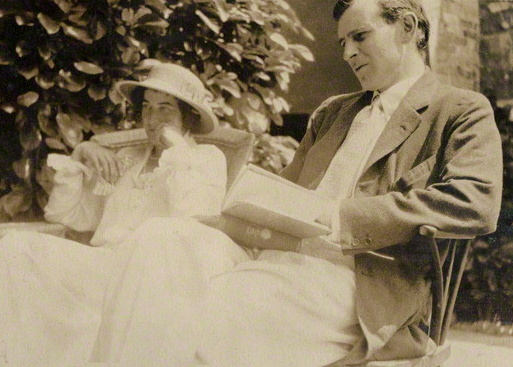
Katharine Asquith with her husband Raymond, 1913

However, Raymond's father and stepmother, Margot Tennant Asquith, provided him an allowance. Katharine and Raymond became engaged in February 1907, and on 25 July 1907, they were married in St Margaret's, Westminster. They made their home at 49 Bedford Square in Bloomsbury and at Mells Manor, where Katharine's parents continued to live. Raymond was killed on the battlefront in 1916, and Sir John died in 1927. Lady Horner continued to live with the family until her own death in 1940. Both Raymond and Katharine were central members of the "Corrupt Coterie" composed largely of children of the Souls and who in the words of Lady Diana Cooper, were "unafraid of words, unshocked by drink, and unashamed of "decadence" and gambling." Raymond's nickname for Katharine was "Fawnia". Katharine and Raymond had three children:

- Lady Helen Asquith OBE (1908–2000), a teacher and school inspector. She did not marry.
- Lady Perdita Asquith (1910–1996), who married William Jolliffe, 4th Baron Hylton (d. 1967) and had three children. Perdita's grandchildren included the actress Anna Chancellor.
- Julian Asquith, 2nd Earl of Oxford and Asquith KCMG (1916–2011), who married Anne Palairet (daughter of Sir Michael Palairet) and had five children, including Raymond Asquith, 3rd Earl of Oxford and Asquith, the current earl.

When their third child and only son was born, Asquith wrote from the Front to Katharine about their future plans; "Shall we send him into the Cabinet or into the Grenadiers?" They nicknamed the boy "Trim" after Trimalchio, a character in the work of Petronius. Katharine and her friend Lady Diana Manners were both Voluntary Aid Detachment (VAD) nurses during the war, and Diana recorded that they both gained some temporary relief from their troubles during this period by drugging themselves with morphia. In April 1918, Katharine's nursing career took her to the Duchess of Sutherland's Hospital at Saint-Omer, France, and the children were looked after by a nanny. While in France, Katharine movingly wrote her mother: "We drove back quite late we weren't very far from the front lines - say eight miles & the sky was lit by the guns - just like summer lightning & I felt that I saw just what Raymond & E must have seen every night." Katharine was recommended for the British Empire Medal for her performance of duty.

== Later life ==
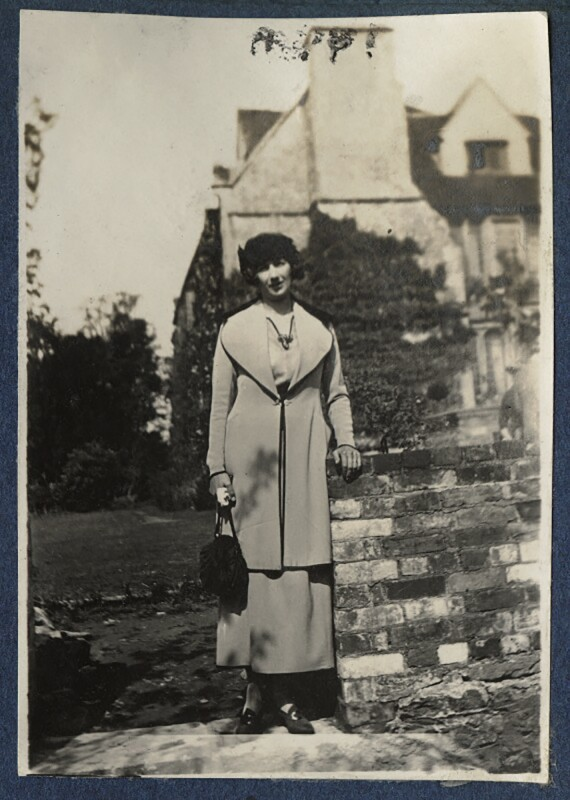
Snapshot of Katharine Asquith by Lady Ottoline Morrell, 1920

Raymond was killed in action on 15 September 1916 during the Battle of the Somme. Raymond's death was shattering for Katharine. A few days after receiving the death notification, her father-in-law visited Katharine and recalled, "I have never seen anyone so stunned and shattered. All she wants to do is to die." Katharine never remarried, and Evelyn Waugh's biographer, Selina Hastings, commented that she "lived her life permanently in the shadow of her husband's death." Katharine converted to Catholicism in 1923 and brought up her children in the Catholic faith. She arranged for a private chapel to be built in the manor house.

Her two brothers having died, Katharine inherited Mells Manor after her parents' death. She welcomed many Catholic writers and thinkers such as Evelyn Waugh, Christopher Hollis, Douglas Woodruff, Siegfried Sassoon, Hilaire Belloc, Martin D'Arcy, and Ronald Knox. Katharine first met Evelyn Waugh on a Hellenic cruise in September 1933 and struck up a close friendship that lasted until his death. In a letter to Katharine, Waugh revealed, "There is no one whose opinion I value more than yours." She became godmother to Waugh's son, Auberon, and Waugh dedicated his biography of Ronald Knox to Katharine and Lady Daphne Acton. Another prominent convert, close friend and frequent visitor to Mells was the poet Siegfried Sassoon who was received into the Catholic Church in 1957 and later buried in St Andrew's churchyard.

After the Second World War Ronald Knox settled at Mells. Knox, himself a convert, had been Roman Catholic chaplain at the University of Oxford before the war. While a resident, Knox finished his re-translation of the Latin Vulgate Bible into English. Early in 1957, he was diagnosed with terminal cancer, and Katharine cared for him in person until his death later in the year. He was buried in the churchyard at St Andrew's, where Katharine was also buried on her death in 1976, at the age of 90.

Both Katharine and Raymond are portrayed in Phoebe Traquair's apse mural in All Saints, Thorney Hill, Hampshire.
