= Mells Park =

Country estate in Somerset, England

Coordinates: 51°14′12″N 2°24′44″W

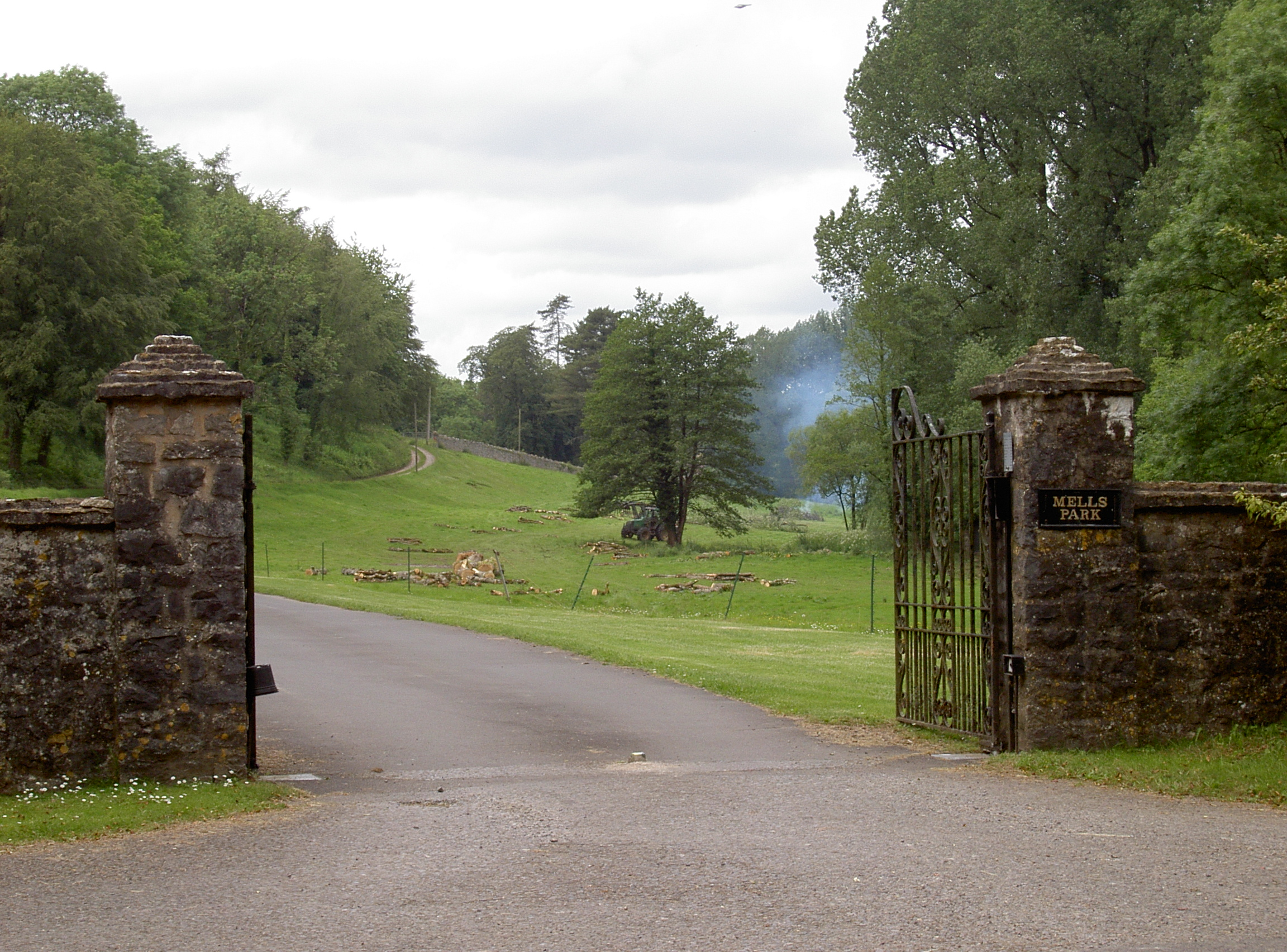
Mells Park entrance

Mells Park is a country estate of 140 hectares (350 acres) near Mells, Somerset, England. It originated as a 17th-century deer park, probably created by the Horner family, who had been the owners of Mells Manor from 1543. The Horners expanded the park and planted extensive woodlands, resulting in a large collection of mature trees, especially 18th-century plantings of oak, lime and beech. The park is Grade II listed in the National Register of Historic Parks and Gardens. It contains Park House, also known as Mells Park House, a Grade II* listed building, built in 1925 in neoclassical style by the architect Edwin Lutyens, replacing an 18th-century house of the same name. It is c. 1 mile (1.6 km) west of Mells Manor House, which does not lie within the park.

During 1987–90, Park House was used for secret negotiations between the African National Congress and the South African government.

The estate is a venue for game shooting.

== Enclosure and first Park House ==
The deer park was enclosed between 1604 and 1642, probably by Sir John Horner. In 1724 Thomas Strangways Horner commissioned Nathaniel Ireson to build the first Park House, and the family moved there from Mells Manor House. His nephew Thomas Horner expanded the park and planted extensive woodlands, a work continued by his son Colonel Thomas Strangways Horner. The house is on high ground towards the northern end of the park, surrounded by river valleys. Further north, to the rear of the house, the park includes a lake fed by the Mells River. Pleasure grounds around the house and towards the lake were laid out by the landscape designer William Sawrey Gilpin between 1825 and 1832.

Future Prime Minister H. H. Asquith and his wife Margot spent their honeymoon at Mells Park in 1894, as guests of Sir John Horner and his wife Lady Frances Horner, the daughter of Liberal MP and art patron William Graham. Finding Park House too expensive to inhabit, in c. 1900 the Horners let it out and moved back into Mells Manor House. Park House burnt down in 1917, although an arcaded service court at the rear of the house survived.

18th-century outbuildings which survive as Grade II listed buildings include stables and a coach house to the north of the house, built c. 1761, probably by the architect John Wood the Younger, Lilley Batch Lodge, built c. 1790, and a folly called the Duckery, also built c. 1790.

== Second Park House ==
The architect Edwin Lutyens had known the Horners, and Mells Park, since 1896. In 1918 he unsuccessfully tried to persuade the Horners to rebuild Park House. However, Reginald McKenna, the chairman of Midland Bank, and formerly Home Secretary and Chancellor of the Exchequer under Asquith, was married to Pamela Jekyll, the niece of Frances Horner. In 1924, the Horners agreed to let Mells Park to them for a nominal rent, on the understanding that the McKennas would rebuild the house. The McKennas had commissioned Lutyens before, in 1911, to build their town house, Mulberry House, at 36 Smith Square, London. Lutyens rebuilt Park House in neoclassical style in 1925. He built a two-storey, hip-roofed house in Bath stone, on the outline of the previous building, and joined it onto the surviving arcaded service court. The new main range has seven bays along the south and north elevations and four along each side, with Doric pilasters.

Around 1926, Lutyens also designed gardens around the house, in collaboration with garden designer Gertrude Jekyll, who was another aunt of Pamela McKenna.

The family sold Mells Park in 1939, following the death of Sir John Horner in 1927. The McKennas had already left Mells Park, for Halnaker, Sussex, where they commissioned Lutyens to build another country house. This was Halnaker Park, built in 1938.

== South African negotiations ==
Mells Park was later owned by the South African mining company Consolidated Gold Fields. In the late 1980s the company provided Park House as the venue for secret negotiations between Thabo Mbeki of the African National Congress, who was later the President of South Africa, and representatives of the then-governing National Party. The talks, which lasted from 1987 till the time of Nelson Mandela's release in 1990, were depicted in the 2009 film Endgame.

== In literature ==
Mells Park appears as "Falls Park" in Thomas Hardy's short story "The First Countess of Wessex", in the 1891 collection A Group of Noble Dames.

In 1983, Mells Park was used as the filming location for the ITV television series Robin of Sherwood. In the programme, it doubled for Loxley Village, where Robin originally came from.

== See also ==
- St Andrew's Church, Mells, contains memorials associated with the Horners and Asquiths, some by Lutyens
- Mells War Memorial (Lutyens, 1921)
