= Memory Hold-the-Door =

1940 autobiography of John Buchan

- First edition 1940
- Author: John Buchan
- Genre: Autobiography
- Publisher: Hodder and Stoughton
- Publication date: 1940
- Media type: Print
- Pages: 327

Memory Hold-the-Door is a 1940 autobiographical memoir by the Scottish writer John Buchan. It was published posthumously, Buchan having died in February of that year. In the United States the book was released under the title Pilgrim's Way.

In a preface to the book Buchan disclaims the description of autobiography, preferring to call his work "a journal of certain experiences, not written in the experiencing moment, but rebuilt out of memory".

== Content ==
The book recounts Buchan's life of public service, his literary work from his early days in the Scottish Highlands through his years at Oxford, and his service in both Britain's Boer campaign and World War I (the latter, as Britain's Director of Intelligence and Information for the War Cabinet), before covering his years in Parliament, and appointment as Governor General of Canada. He includes profiles of such contemporaries as Lord Grey, Lord Oxford, Raymond Asquith, Lord Haldane, Earl Balfour, Lord French, Sir Henry Wilson, Lord Haig, Lord Byng of Vimy, T. E. Lawrence, and King George V.

== Appreciation ==
Pilgrim's Way (as it was called in America) was said to be John F. Kennedy's favourite book. A list of Kennedy's favourite books given to Life magazine in 1961 was headed by Buchan's Montrose, and another list sent out upon request to various libraries during National Library Week was headed by David Cecil's Lord Melbourne, but there is no evidence that either of these lists placed the books in order of preference. Kennedy urged anyone he wanted to understand him to read Pilgrim's Way, and often quoted passages from it to friends and associates whom he regarded as equally appreciative of fine prose.
