= William Jolliffe, 4th Baron Hylton =

British peer and soldier

The Right Honourable The Lord Hylton

Member of the House of Lords Lord Temporal
- In office 26 May 1945 – 14 November 1967; Hereditary Peerage
- Preceded by: The 3rd Lord Hylton
- Succeeded by: The 5th Lord Hylton

Personal details
- Born: 2 December 1898
- Died: 14 November 1967 (aged 68)

William George Hervey Jolliffe, 4th Baron Hylton (2 December 1898 – 14 November 1967), was a British peer and soldier.

Hylton was the son of Hylton Jolliffe, 3rd Baron Hylton, and Lady Alice Adeliza Hervey. He achieved the rank of Lieutenant-Colonel in the Coldstream Guards and also served as Lord Lieutenant of Somerset from 1949 to 1964. Lord Hylton married Lady Perdita Rose Mary Asquith, daughter of Katharine and Raymond Asquith, eldest son of Prime Minister H. H. Asquith, in 1931. He died in November 1967, aged 68.

He was succeeded in his titles by his elder son Raymond. John Hedworth Jolliffe, a writer (of e.g. Raymond Asquith: Life and Letters) was his younger son; his daughter Mary is the wife of John Paget Chancellor, son of Christopher Chancellor of Reuters. Mary and John Chancellor are the parents of the actress Anna Chancellor and the financial historian Edward Chancellor.

Honorary titles
Preceded by Sir James Somerville	Lord Lieutenant of Somerset; 1949–1964	Succeeded by Cecil Townley Mitford-Slade
Peerage of the United Kingdom
Preceded by Hylton George Hylton Jolliffe	Baron Hylton; 1945–1967	Succeeded by Raymond Hervey Jolliffe
