= The Coterie =

Set of English aristocrats and intellectuals of the 1910s

The Coterie was a fashionable and famous set of English aristocrats and intellectuals of the 1910s, widely quoted and profiled in magazines and newspapers of the period. They also called themselves the "Corrupt Coterie".

== Members ==
Its members included Lady Diana Manners, then considered a famous beauty in England; Duff Cooper, who became a Conservative politician and a diplomat; Raymond Asquith, son of the Prime Minister H. H. Asquith and a famed barrister; Maurice Baring; Patrick Shaw-Stewart, a managing director of Barings Bank and war poet; Julian & Billy Grenfell, Nancy Cunard and her friend Iris Tree; Edward Horner and Sir Denis Anson. Also included in the group were Hugo Francis Charteris (Lord Elcho) and Yvo Alan Charteris, sons of the Earl and Countess of Wemyss of Stanway House.

Many were the children of The Souls, with Lady Diana Manners and Raymond Asquith being seen as the undisputed leaders of the group.

=== First World War ===
The First World War destroyed the original Coterie, taking the lives of Percy "Perf" Wyndham in 1914; Charles Lister, Julian Grenfell, Billy Grenfell, and Yvo Charteris in 1915; Edward Tennant, Hugo "Ego" Charteris and Raymond Asquith in 1916; and Edward Horner and Patrick Shaw-Stewart in 1917. It also destroyed the security of the group's prewar life, and the remnants were slowly breaking around them after the war.

Lady Diana Manners was seen as a "focus for all the interlocking friendships", comforting many who had lost their husbands or siblings in the War. She wrote to Patrick Shaw-Stewart about supporting Katharine Asquith after the death of her husband Raymond Asquith: "I tried to sink my misery and think of holding K up as we all must."

== Activities ==
They were best known for their extravagant parties and were associated with such places as the Café Royal and The Cave of the Golden Calf, London's first nightclub. The group made a common pledge to be "unafraid of words, unshocked by drink, and unashamed of 'decadence' and gambling". The group reveled in drink, blasphemy, gambling, injecting heroin, and chloroform ("chlorers") sniffing. While the group's principal purpose was the pursuit of pleasure, their default attitude was one of cynical heartlessness, that at times was downright cruel.

Reportedly, without the occasionally moderating influence of Raymond Asquith, the behaviour of the group might have been even more unacceptable and out of control, as he was fourteen years older than Lady Diana and respected by the whole group. In the early years of the group Asquith was the leader, moderating them to take pride in their learning and erudition, while enjoying wild parties and pranks. For all their wild parties, however, there was still a standard of behaviour to be upheld and all members paid for the damage that they caused.

The members indulged in treasure hunts, fancy dress balls, and poker evenings, while holding riotous parties until dawn, with their actions documented by the press. The members were also in high demand by the great hostesses and eminent politicians of the day. Their behaviour at one such party was documented by Asquith's stepmother who recorded that, "After dinner, Diana ejaculated, 'I must be unconscious tonight' and went away in a taxi to fetch chloroform from the chemist. 'Jolly old chlorers!' One guest who had nearly fainted at dinner had to be removed before the orgy began."

=== World War I ===
With the outbreak of war, many members left for the Western Front, causing Asquith to be seen as the pre-war symbol of the Coterie, and Lady Diana Manners, becoming Lady Diana Cooper as wife of Duff Cooper, to become the post-war symbol for the 'new' Coterie. She became known for throwing wilder parties, with freer sex and drink in an effort to escape the horrors of the war.

At the start of the war, Manners wrote to Edward Horner on 7 August 1914, claiming that she thought it was "...up to the Coterie to stop this war."

== Reactions ==
Lady Diana Manners later wrote that she was a little ashamed of the name, and did not know how it came to be called the Coterie, just as her mother was ashamed of the title of the Souls.

Lady Diana also reported that the group's "peak of unpopularity was certainly 1914 and 1915". This sentiment was followed by some of their parents, as Raymond Asquith's stepmother wrote to Hilda Harrisson, calling the group "a rotten social gang ... who lead a futile and devastating life". Lady Cynthia Asquith, Raymond Asquith's sister-in-law, wrote in her diary "I don't care a damn about their morals and manners, but I do think what – for want of a better word – I call their anti-cant, is really suicidal to happiness".

Two deaths were attributed to the group and their actions: Gustav Hamel and Sir Denis Anson. Hamel was an aviator and racing driver, who crashed his private plane into the sea during a flight from France to London on 23 May 1914. Anson drowned two months later, after diving into the Thames as a prank during a late-night boat-party. Another man, William Mitchell, died while attempting to save Anson. Mitchell had been a musician, one of the band hired to entertain the party.

Various members of the Coterie, including Raymond Asquith and Lady Manners, appear as characters in Robert Harris's 2024 novel Precipice, which also includes a fictionalised account of the boat-party during which Denis Anson drowned.
