= Commissioners of Woods, Forests and Land Revenues =

The Commissioners of Woods, Forests and Land Revenues were officials under the United Kingdom Crown, charged with the management of Crown lands. Their office were customarily known as the Office of Woods.

Under the Crown Lands Act 1851 (14 & 15 Vict. c. 42) they took over from the Commissioners of Woods, Forests, Land Revenues, Works, and Buildings those functions which related to the revenue-earning parts of the Crown lands. In 1924 the royal forests including the New Forest and Forest of Dean were transferred from the Office of Woods to the new Forestry Commission, and the title of the Commissioners of Woods, Forests and Land Revenues was changed from 1 January 1925 to Commissioners of Crown Lands by the Forestry (Title of Commissioners of Woods) Order 1924 (SR&O 1924/1370).

== Commissioners of Woods, Forests and Land Revenues ==
- 1851 Charles Alexander Gore and Thomas Francis Kennedy
- 1851 Charles Alexander Gore and Hon. James Howard
- 1882 Charles Alexander Gore and Sir Henry Loch
- 1884 Charles Alexander Gore and George Culley
- 1885 Robert Kingscote and George Culley
- 1893 Robert Kingscote and Stafford Howard
- 1895 John Francis Fortescue Horner and Stafford Howard
- 1908 George Leveson-Gower and Stafford Howard
- 1912 Sir Stafford Howard retired and his duties were shared between the President of the Board of Agriculture and G. Leveson Gower until 1924.
