= St Andrew's Church, Mells =

Church in Somerset, England

Church of St Andrew, Mells
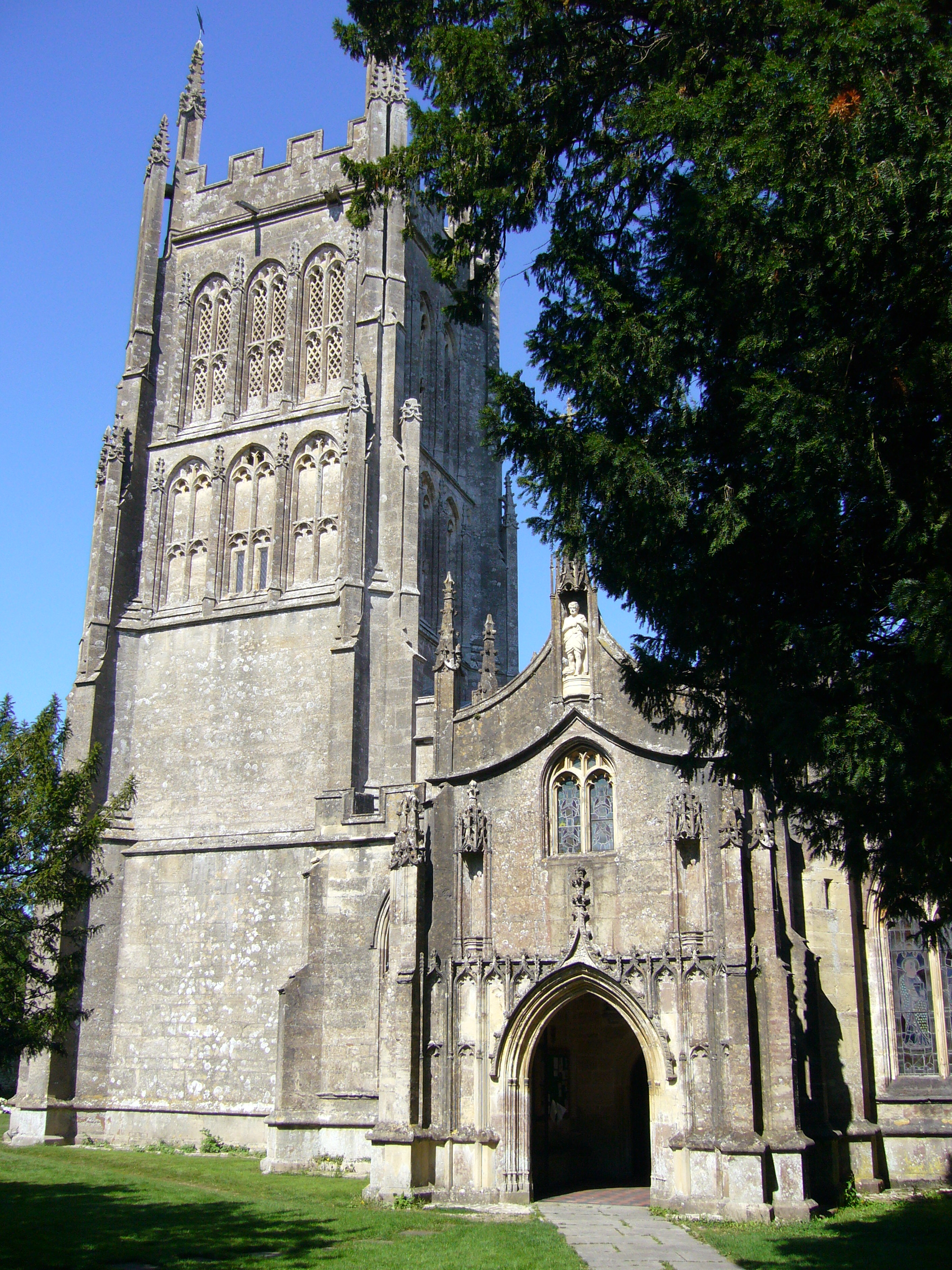
- Church of St Andrew, Mells
- Church of St Andrew, Mells
- 51°14′30.94″N 2°23′25.89″W
- Denomination: Church of England
- Churchmanship: Broad Church

History
- Dedication: St. Andrew

Administration
- Province: Canterbury
- Diocese: Bath and Wells
- Archdeaconry: Wells
- Deanery: Frome
- Parish: Mells with Vobster

St Andrew's Church is a Church of England parish church located in the village of Mells in the English county of Somerset. The church is a grade I listed building.

== History ==
The current church predominantly dates from the late 15th century and was built in the Perpendicular style with mid 19th century restoration, although a previous church stood on the site for centuries. In 1292 it belonged to Glastonbury Abbey and was valued at 35 marks. The church has close connections with the local Asquith family and the Horners who lived at Mells Manor.

=== Notable burials ===
A number of notable individuals are buried at the church, or have commemorative memorials within it. Interments include the poet Siegfried Sassoon; the priest, Ronald Knox; politician Sir Maurice Bonham Carter, the novelist George A. Birmingham aka James Owen Hannay, and Katharine Asquith, widow of Raymond Asquith.

Memorials include an equestrian statue of Edward Horner by Sir Alfred Munnings (on a base by Lutyens): Horner fell at the Battle of Cambrai in 1917. The quality of the statue led to a commission from the Jockey Club for Munnings to create a bronze of the racehorse Brown Jack; a bronze wreath designed by Sir Edwin Lutyens, who also designed the Mells War Memorial, with lettering by Eric Gill, to Raymond Asquith; a bronze plaque to Captain Stanes Geoffrey Bates of the 7th Queen's Own Hussars, killed in action near Ypres in the First World War; and a white gesso plaque of 1886 by Edward Burne-Jones to Laura Lyttelton. Burne-Jones created a gilded copy of the memorial which is in the Victoria and Albert Museum.

== Architecture ==
The interior includes a reredos made from white marble, and a marble altar in various colours with a Norman font. There are also several stained glass windows dating from around 1850. Other notable features and fittings include a stained-glass window by William Nicholson, a tapestry after Burne-Jones by Lady Horner and a stone tablet listing the names of the village's dead from the two world wars The church is a Grade I listed building.

=== Organ, bells and clock ===
The church has a two manual pipe organ dating from 1880 by Vowles. A specification of the organ can be found on the National Pipe Organ Register.

The tower, dated around 1446, has a clock from the 17th century and a ring of 8 bells hung for change ringing, the earliest of which dates from 1716. That bell, the fourth of the ring, and the seventh (1717) were cast by the first Abraham Rudhall of the bellfounders Rudhall of Gloucester. Two more (the third and eighth) were cast in 1745 by Thomas Bilbie, and the sixth (1788) by William Bilbie of the Bilbie family of bellfounders. The other three bells, (the first, second and fifth) were cast in 1869 by Mears & Stainbank of the Whitechapel Bell Foundry. There is also a sanctus bell hung in the roof of the chancel which dates from around 1325 which is on the national database of historically important bells.

== Gallery ==
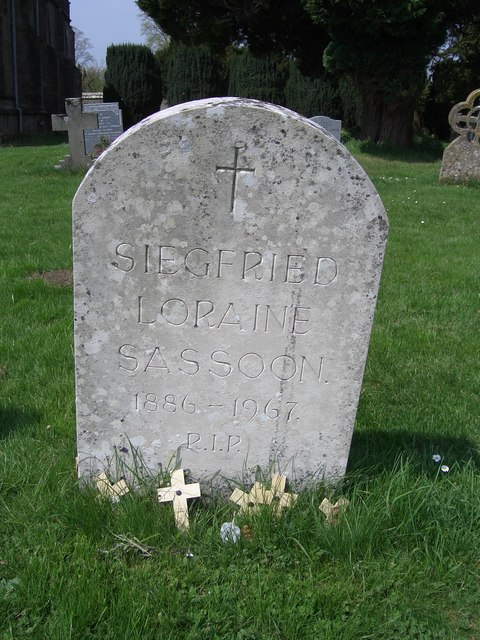
Grave of Siegfried Sassoon

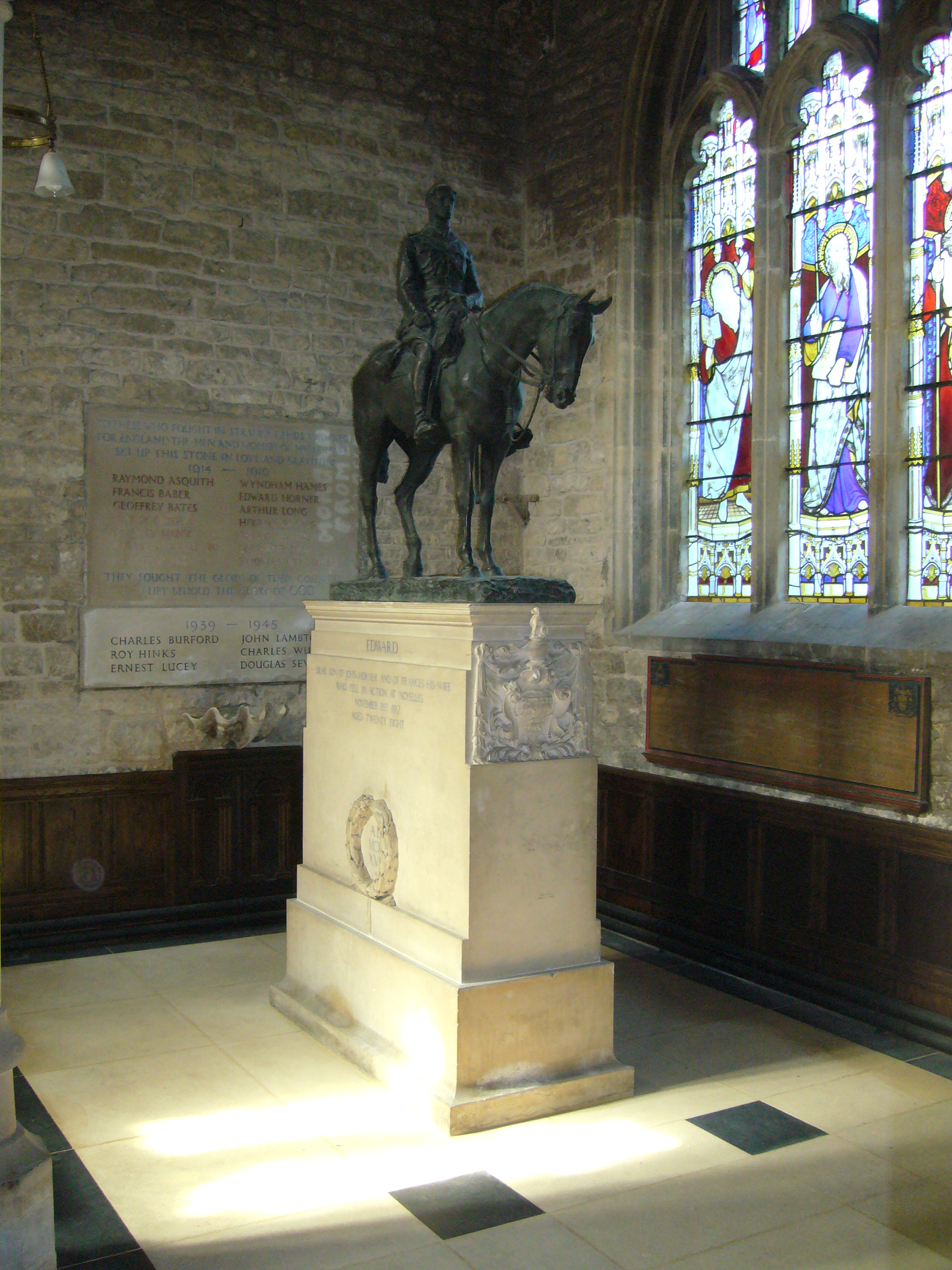
The memorial to Edward Horner

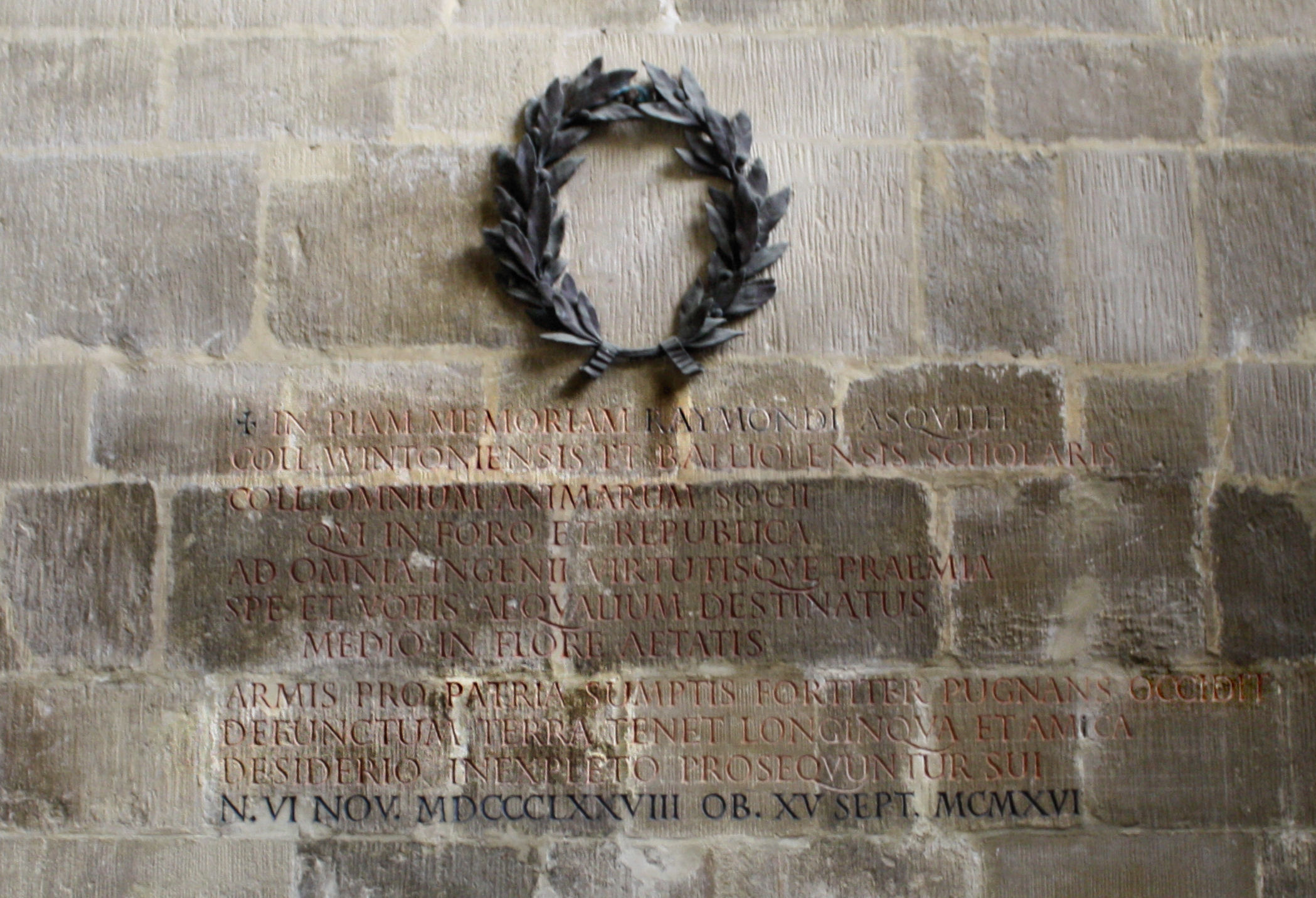
Memorial to Raymond Asquith

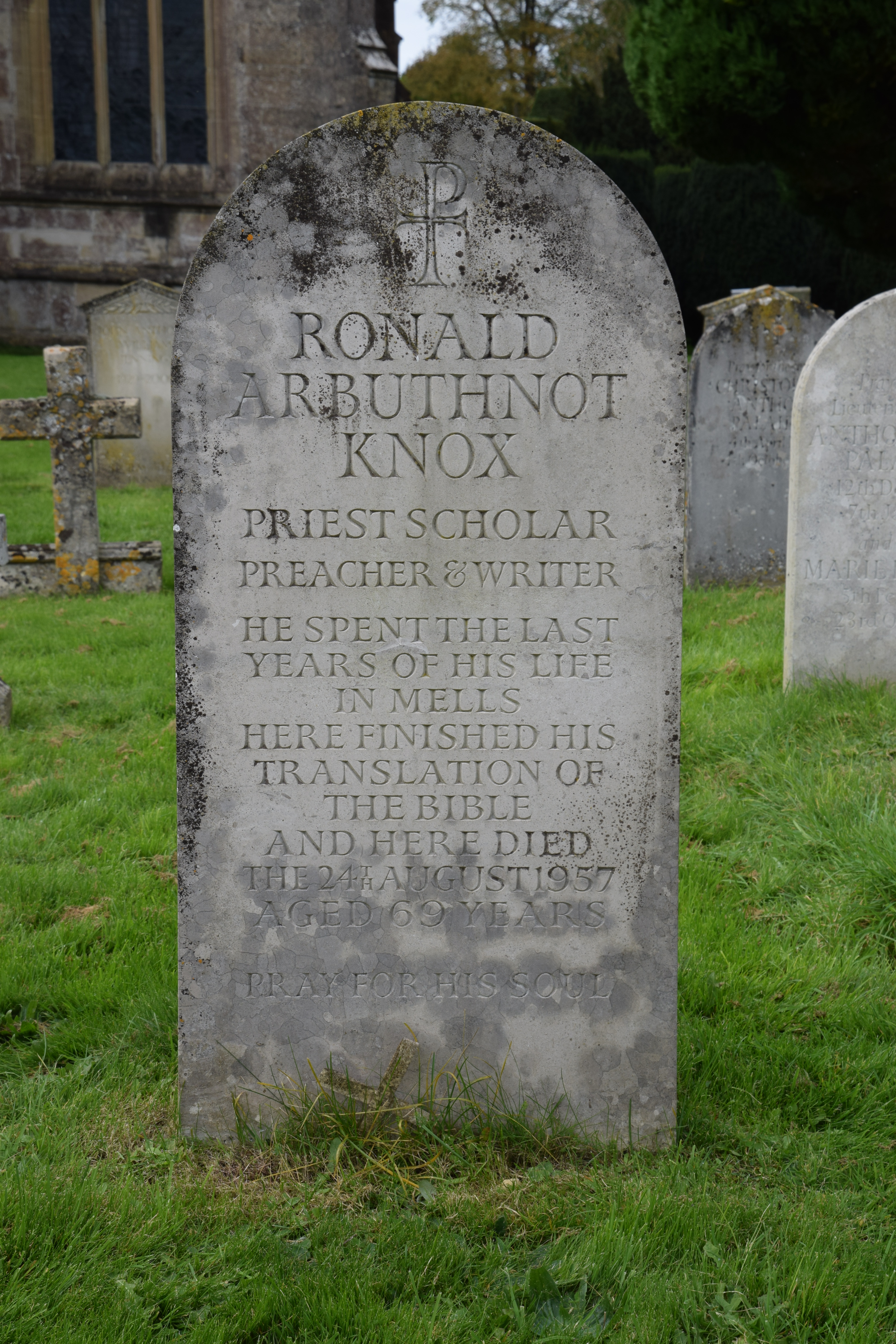
Grave of Ronald Knox

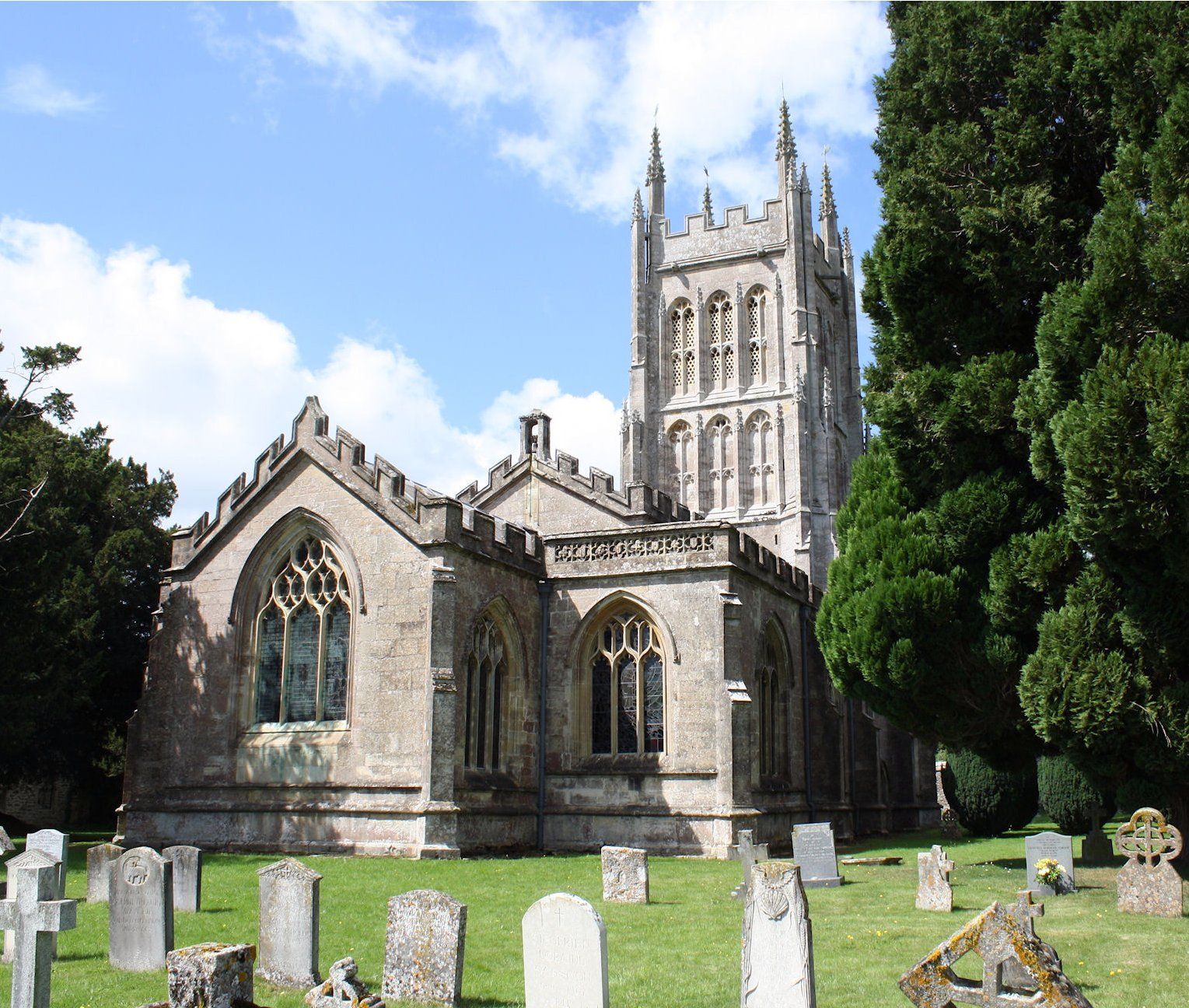
Churchyard

== See also ==
- List of ecclesiastical parishes in the Diocese of Bath and Wells
