= Little Jack Horner =

English nursery rhyme

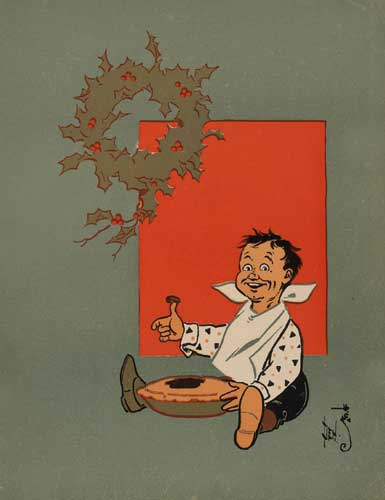
William Wallace Denslow's illustration of the rhyme, 1902

"Little Jack Horner" is a popular English nursery rhyme with the Roud Folk Song Index number 13027. First mentioned in the 18th century, it was early associated with acts of opportunism, particularly in politics. Moralists also rewrote and expanded the poem so as to counter its celebration of greediness. The name of Jack Horner also came to be applied to a completely different and older poem on a folkloric theme; and in the 19th century, it was claimed that the rhyme was originally composed in satirical reference to the dishonest actions of Thomas Horner in the Tudor period.

== Lyrics and melody ==
The song's most common lyrics are:

Little Jack Horner
Sat in the corner,
Eating his Christmas pie;
He put in his thumb,
And pulled out a plum,
And said, "What a good boy am I!"

It was first documented in full in the nursery rhyme collection Mother Goose's Melody, or, Sonnets for the Cradle, which may date from 1765, although the earliest surviving English edition is from 1791.

The melody commonly associated with the rhyme was first recorded by the composer and nursery rhyme collector James William Elliott, in his National Nursery Rhymes and Nursery Songs (1870).

== Origin and meaning ==
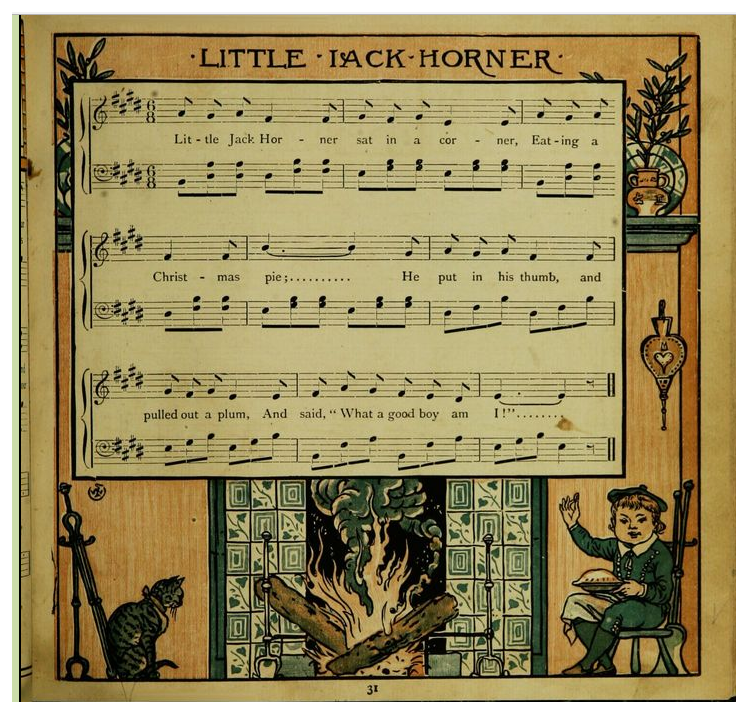
The original melody, 1877

The earliest reference to the well-known verse is in "Namby Pamby," a satire by Henry Carey published in 1725, in which he himself italicised lines dependent on the original:

Now he sings of Jackey Horner
Sitting in the Chimney-Corner
Eating of a Christmas pye,
Putting in his thumb, Oh fie!
Putting in, Oh fie! his Thumb,
Pulling out, Oh strange! a Plum.

This occurrence has been taken to suggest that the rhyme was well known by the early eighteenth century. Carey's poem ridicules fellow writer Ambrose Philips, who had written infantile poems for the young children of his aristocratic patrons. Although several other nursery rhymes are mentioned in his poem, the one about Little Jack Horner has been associated with acts of opportunism ever since. Just six years later, it figured in another satirical work, Henry Fielding's The Grub Street Opera (1731). Fielding's rendition had the prime minister, Robert Walpole, as its target, and ended with all the characters processing off the stage "to the music of Little Jack Horner."

The political theme was later taken up by Samuel Bishop, one of whose epigrams describes the civil service bureaucracy and enquires:

What are they but JACK HORNERS, who snug in their corners,
Cut freely the public pie?
Till each with his thumb has squeezed out a round plum,
Then he cries, "What a Great Man am I!"

Soon after, Thomas Love Peacock took up the theme in his satirical novel, Melincourt (1817). In Melincourt, five go-getting characters contribute to a song describing how they misuse their trades to fleece the public. It begins with the recitative:

Jack Horner's CHRISTMAS PIE my learned nurse
Interpreted to mean the public purse.
From thence a plum he drew. O happy Horner!
Who would not be ensconced in thy snug corner?

Each in turn then describes the nature of his sharp practice in his particular profession, followed by the general chorus: "And we'll all have a finger, a finger, a finger, / We'll all have a finger in the CHRISTMAS PIE."

Adeline Dutton Train Whitney likewise applied the nursery rhyme to opportunism in American society in Mother Goose for grown folks: a Christmas reading (New York, 1860). The privileged little boy grows up to become "John, Esquire," and goes in search of richer plums, where he is joined in his quest by "female Horners."

John Bellenden Ker Gawler charged the mediaeval legal profession with similar interested motives in his Essay on the Archaiology of Popular English Phrases and Nursery Rhymes (Southampton, 1834). Claiming to trace back the rhyme of Little Jack Horner to its "Low Saxon" origin, he then 'translates' the social criticism he discovers there, and adds an anti-clerical commentary of his own.

Such social criticism was reapplied in earnest to the 20th century in an antiauthoritarian lyric from Danbert Nobacon's The Unfairy Tale (1985). The schoolboy Jack Horner is put in the corner for resisting the racist and self-regarding interpretation of history given by his teacher. But eventually, the children rise up to defend him:

But when the head walked in the children made such a din.
They said, "Jack get up, you got to get out, don't let them push you about, you know they'll keep you in that corner till you're dead. Jack get out, don't sell out, don't compromise with Christmas pies. Keep shouting back, you tell 'em Jack, don't swallow none of their crap. Calling Jack Horners everywhere, don't bend to authority which doesn't care, you know they'll keep you in that corner 'till you're dead."

== "What a good boy am I!" ==
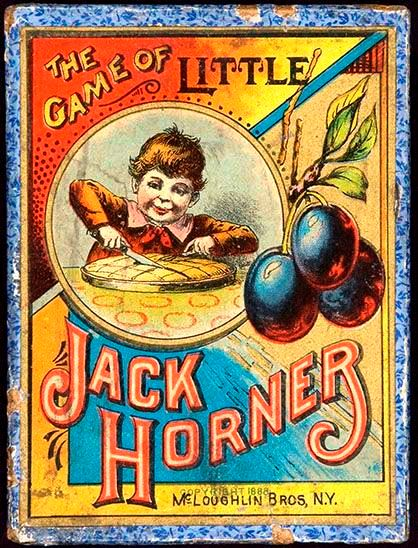
The game of Little Jack Horner, marketed by the McLoughlin Brothers in 1888

Jack Horner's opportunism made him a target for adult moralists from the start. At a basic level, the nursery rhyme's hearty celebration of appetite seems an endorsement of greediness. Therefore, it was not long before educators of the young began to rewrite the poem in order to recommend an alternative attitude. In The Renowned History of Little Jack Horner, dating from the 1820s, generous Jack gives his pie to a poor woman on his way to school, and is rewarded with a newly baked pie on his return home. The poem concludes by reversing the picture presented in the original rhyme:

Now let every good boy,
With a sweetmeat or toy,
Not slyly sneak into a corner,
But to playmates repair
And give them a share.

The poem was republished later with different illustrations as The Amusing History of Little Jack Horner (1830–1832), and again with different illustrations as Park's Amusing History of Little Jack Horner (1840). Contemporaneously in America, the same recommendation to share with friends was made by Fanny E. Lacy in the first of the expanded Juvenile Songs of her composition. Yet another collection of rewritten rhymes published in 1830 featured a Jack Horner who is unable even to spell the word 'pie' (spelled 'pye' in the original version).

After such an onslaught, it is something of a reformed Jack Horner, harnessed to educational aims, who appears on the Staffordshire Potteries ABC plates of the 1870s and 1880s, as well as on a Mintons tile for the nursery, where the feasting Jack is accompanied by a parental figure carrying keys. There was an educational aim in the card games where Jack Horner figured too. In the American version, originating with the McLoughlin Brothers in 1888, the object was to collect suits in the form of four different varieties of plum in their respective pies. In De La Rue's Little Jack Horner Snap (1890), thirteen different nursery rhymes form the suits to be collected.

== Humour ==
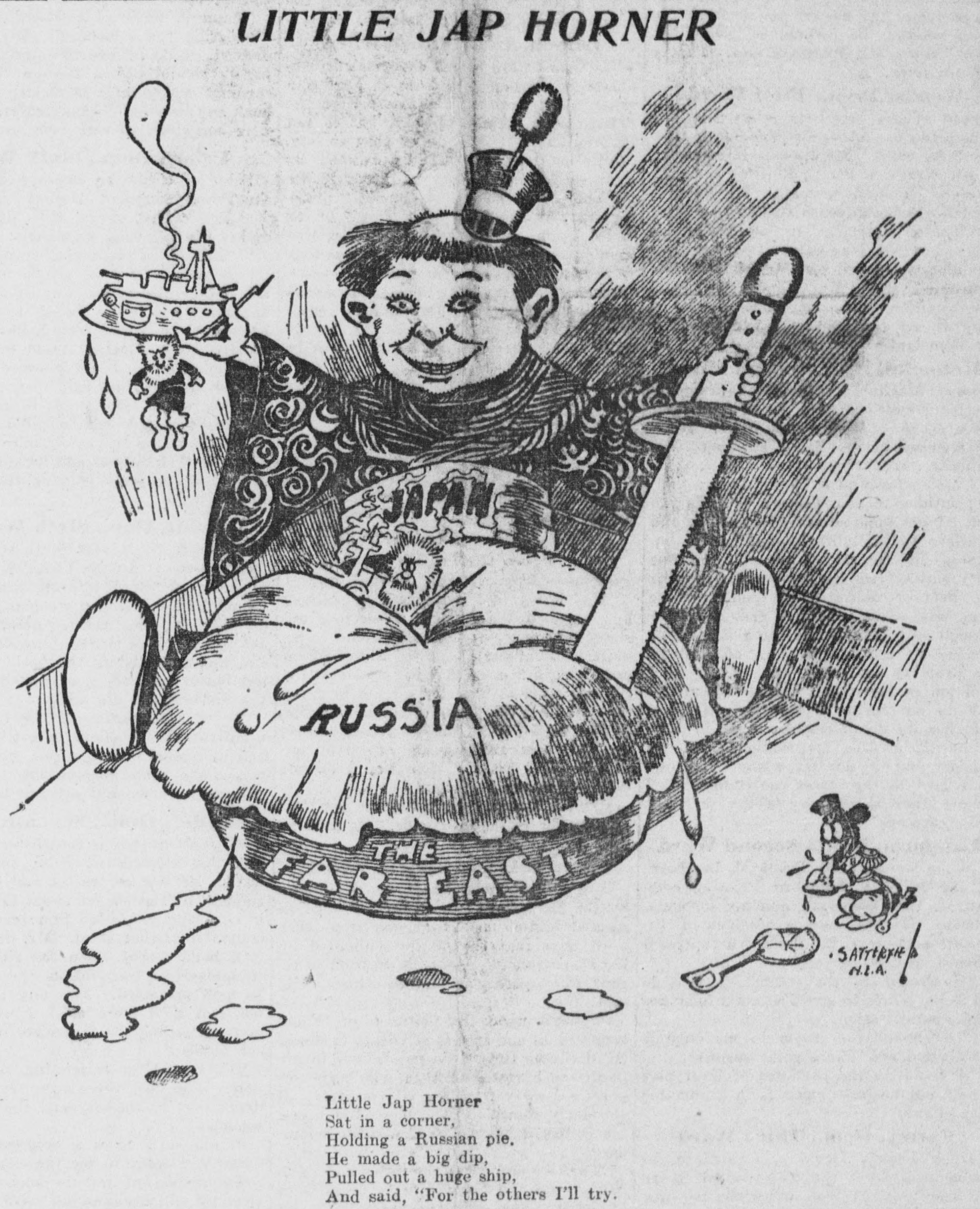
Bob Satterfield's cartoon adapts the rhyme to the Japanese naval victory in the Russo-Japanese War

Jack Horner's adventures with his pie have frequently been referenced in humorous and political cartoons on three continents. In an 1862 issue of Punch, Abraham Lincoln pulls the captured New Orleans out of his pie. In the following century, a copy of the Tacoma Times pictured a Japanese Jack pulling a battleship from the Russian pie during the Russo-Japanese War. In other contexts, the rhyme was applied to Australian politics in the Melbourne Punch; to a Canadian railway scandal; to income tax relief in Ireland; and to David Lloyd George's use of his party political fund. Other humorous uses of the nursery rhyme include: a comic variation in Guy Wetmore Carryl's Mother Goose for Grown Ups (New York, 1900), in which Jack breaks his tooth on a plum stone; and one of Lee G. Kratz's Humorous Quartets for Men's Voices (Boston, 1905), in which the pie is stolen by a cat.

== Alternative histories ==
In the chapbook The History of Jack Horner, Containing the Witty Pranks he play'd, from his Youth to his Riper Years, Being pleasant for Winter Evenings (mid-18th century), there is a summarised version of the nursery rhyme which Jack himself is said to have composed. However, it has been observed that the story is based on the much earlier Tudor tale of The Fryer and the Boy, and that this insertion is merely to justify the use of Jack Horner's name. The book's main purpose is to follow its hero's career after he has left childhood behind.

In the 19th century, a story began to gain currency that the rhyme is actually about Thomas Horner, who was steward to Richard Whiting, the last abbot of Glastonbury before the dissolution of the monasteries under Henry VIII of England. It is asserted that, prior to the abbey's destruction, the abbot sent Horner to London with a huge Christmas pie which had the deeds to a dozen manors hidden within it as a gift to try to convince the King not to nationalise Church lands. During the journey, Horner opened the pie and extracted the deeds of the manor of Mells in Somerset, which he kept for himself. It is further suggested that, since the manor properties included lead mines in the Mendip Hills, the plum is a pun on the Latin plumbum, for lead. While records do indicate that Thomas Horner became the owner of the manor, subsequent owners of Mells Manor have asserted that the legend is untrue, and that Wells purchased the deed from the abbey.

Two later novels provide virtuous heroes named Jack Horner that distance themselves from the nursery character. The first chapter of James Jackson Wray's Jack Horner the second (London, 1887) criticises the behaviour of the first Jack Horner in order to emphasise the preferable behaviour of his virtuous namesake. The "charming little boy" featured in Mary Spear Tiernan's eponymous Jack Horner: A Novel (Houghton, Mifflin & Co, 1890) is equally contrasting. An American foundling, he is so named from being discovered in the Christmas season.

By the second half of the 20th century, the pendulum had swung back to interpreting versions of Jack Horner as a psychologically damaged character. Commenting on the role of Jacob Horner, the dysfunctional narrator of his novel The End of the Road (1958), John Barth commented that "he is supposed to remind you first of Little Jack Horner, who also sits in a corner and rationalizes."

In 2022, an adult version of Jack Horner appears as a villain in the Universal Pictures/DreamWorks Animation movie Puss in Boots: The Last Wish. The owner of a pie business, he now calls himself "Big" Jack Horner.

== Bibliography ==
- Baring-Gould, W. S.; Baring-Gould, C. (1962). The Annotated Mother Goose: Nursery rhymes old and new, arranged and explained. New York, New York: Bramhall House Publishing.
- Opie, I.; Opie, P. (1997) [1951]. The Oxford Dictionary of Nursery Rhymes (2nd ed.). Oxford University Press. pp. 234–237.
