= Mells Manor =

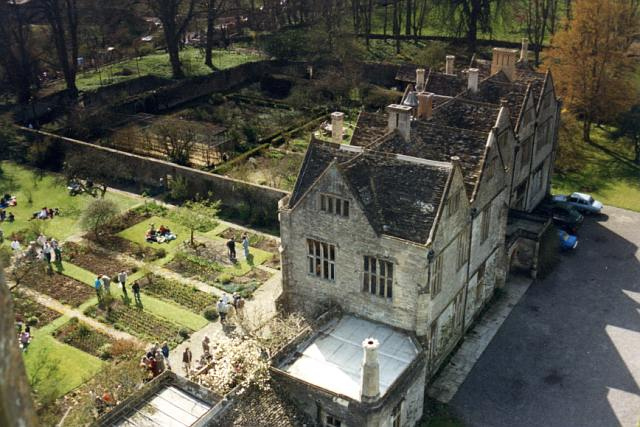
- Mells Manor taken from the tower of the Church of St Andrew

- Location within Somerset
- 51°14′31.47″N 2°23′31.79″W
- Location: Mells, Somerset, England

History
- Built: 16th century

Listed Building – Grade I
- Official name: Mells Manor and garden walls to rear
- Designated: 11 March 1968
- Reference no.: 1058351

National Register of Historic Parks and Gardens
- Official name: Mells Manor House
- Type: Grade I
- Designated: 1 June 1984
- Reference no.: 1000442

Mells Manor at Mells, Somerset, England, was built in the 16th century for Edward Horner, altered in the 17th century, partially demolished around 1780, and restored by Sir Edwin Lutyens in the 20th century. The house, along with the garden walls, has been designated as a Grade I listed building, and is closely associated with the adjacent Church of St Andrew. The gardens are listed, Grade I, on the Register of Historic Parks and Gardens of special historic interest in England.

== History ==
The building was originally much more extensive than its current appearance, including a north wing, with two thirds of the building being demolished around 1780. It was then used as a farmhouse and subsequently as a school for boys undertaking holy orders.

Mells Manor was purportedly procured by Thomas Horner, who had been entrusted by Richard Whiting, the last Abbot of Glastonbury, who had concealed several deeds as a gift to King Henry VIII to curry his favour against nationalising the Church of England and seizing church lands. Prior to this, Horner found the deed for Mells Manor, which he kept for himself. This act is referenced in the popular nursery rhyme Little Jack Horner. An alternative and more likely explanation from Horner's descendants is that the manor was bought from the King's Commissioners in 1543.

The house was visited by Charles I and his troops in 1644.

In 1724, Thomas Strangways Horner moved out of the manor house in the village and commissioned Nathaniel Ireson to build Park House within Mells Park.

The park is bordered by the Mells River. Many sites on the river and its tributaries, owned by the Horners were leased to James Fussell and his family to establish water-powered mills for the production of iron tools.

The house is a residence of the Earl of Oxford and Asquith.

== See also ==
- List of Grade I listed buildings in Mendip
