= Church of St Mary Magdalene, Great Elm =

Church in Somerset, England

Church of St Mary Magdalene
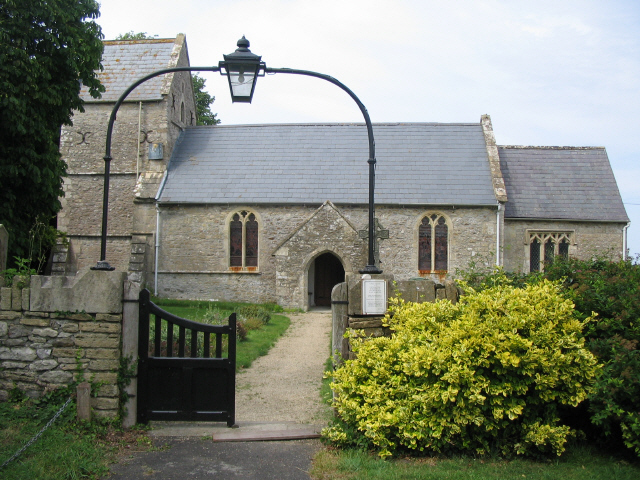

- Location within Somerset

General information
- Location: Great Elm, England
- Coordinates: 51.2425°N 2.3647°W
- Completed: 12th century

The Church of St Mary Magdalene in Great Elm, Somerset, England, dates from the 12th century and is a Grade I listed building.

In the 13th century the two-bay nave was lengthened, possibly when the tower was added around 1240. The chancel was widened around the same period. Some of the Romanesque fabric of the original Norman building can be seen despite the remodelling in the early 17th century. The walls show herringbone pattern masonry. The three-stage tower has corner buttresses and a saddleback roof.

Some of the box pews are Jacobean, and there is a 17th-century pulpit. The West end has an imitation Jacobean gallery formerly used by the choir and organ.

The parish is part of the benefice of Mells with Buckland Dinham, Elm, Whatley and Chantry within the Diocese of Bath and Wells.

== See also ==
- List of Grade I listed buildings in Mendip
- List of towers in Somerset
- List of ecclesiastical parishes in the Diocese of Bath and Wells
