= St Michael's Church, Buckland Dinham =

Church in Somerset, England

Church of St Michael
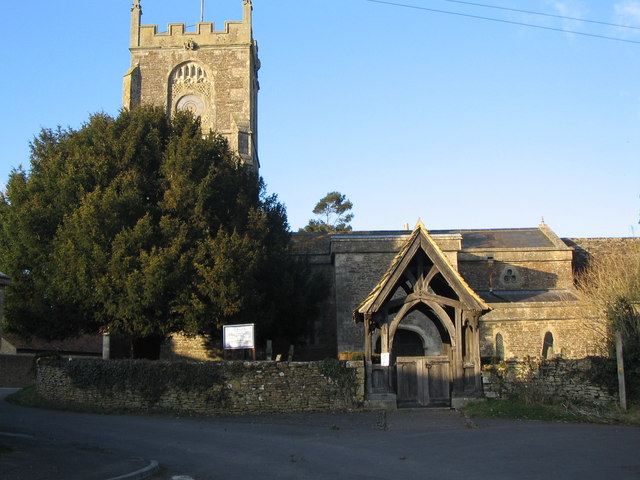

- Location within Somerset

General information
- Location: Buckland Dinham, England
- Coordinates: 51.2600°N 2.3525°W
- Construction started: 1200
- Completed: 1480

The Church of St Michael in Buckland Dinham, Somerset, England, has been designated as a Grade I listed building.

The church has a nave, chancel, south chapel and south porch which date from around 1200. The north chapel was added in 1325, and a further chapel to the north of the chancel and the west tower being added in 1480. It underwent restoration in the late 19th century.

The tower contains six bells which were not rung between the 1950s and 1990s when a restoration project was undertaken including the addition of a bell from St Paul's Church, Bristol.

The Anglican parish is part of the Mells with Buckland Dinham, Elm, Whatley and Chantry benefice within the archdeaconry of Wells.

== See also ==
- List of Grade I listed buildings in Mendip
- List of towers in Somerset
- List of ecclesiastical parishes in the Diocese of Bath and Wells
