= Church of St George, Whatley =

Church in Mendip, UK

Church of St George
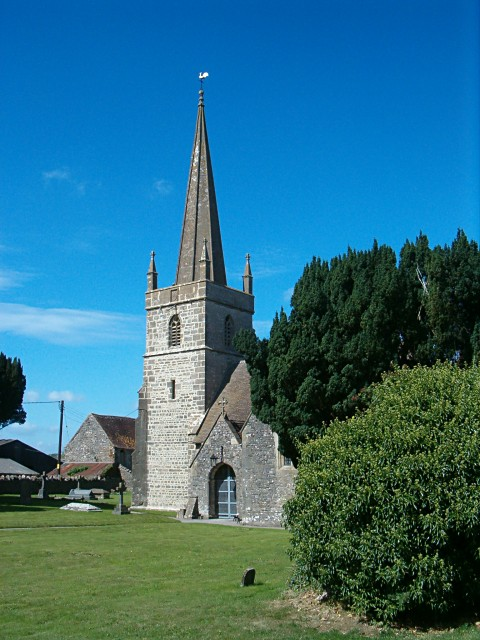

- Location within Somerset
- 51°13′37″N 2°22′56″W
- Location: Whatley, Somerset, England

History
- Built: 14th century

Listed Building – Grade II*
- Designated: 11 March 1968
- Reference no.: 1058258

The Anglican Church of St George in Whatley, within the English county of Somerset, dates from the 14th century. It is a Grade II* listed building.

Parts of the church survive from the 14th century, however extensive restoration was undertaken in 1859 and 1870. The three stage tower is supported by diagonal buttresses. Within the tower are a peel of six bells.

There is a Sarsen stone in the church which may have pagan origins.

The parish is part of the benefice of Mells with Buckland Dinham, Chantry, Great Elm and Whatley within the Diocese of Bath and Wells.

== See also ==
- List of ecclesiastical parishes in the Diocese of Bath and Wells
