= Dorset and Somerset Canal =

Partially-built and abandoned canal in South-West England

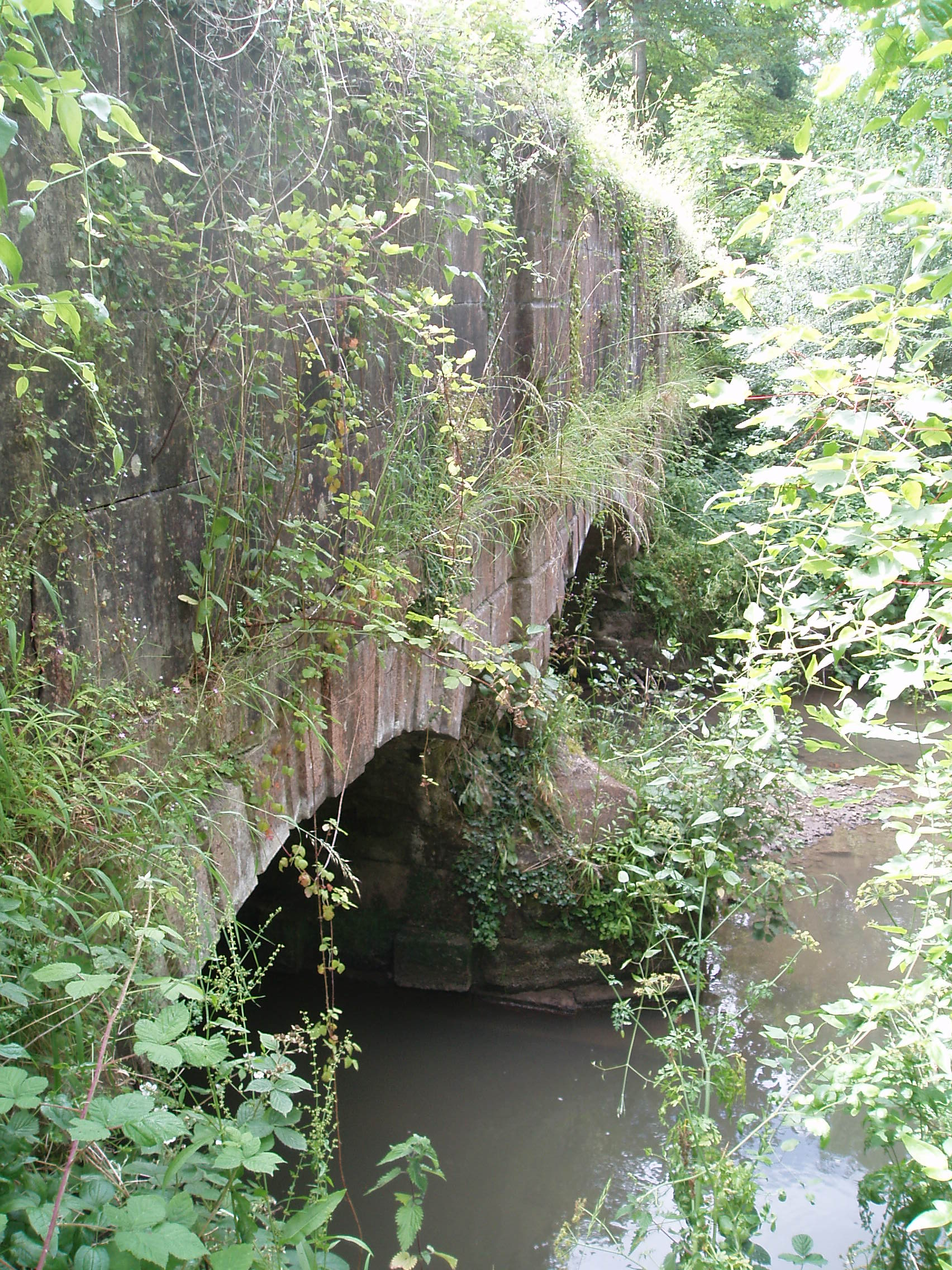
- The north face of Murtry aqueduct

Specifications
- Locks: 0
- Status: Abandoned, not completed

History
- Date of act: 1796
- Date completed: not completed

Geography
- Start point: Nettlebridge
- End point: Frome junction

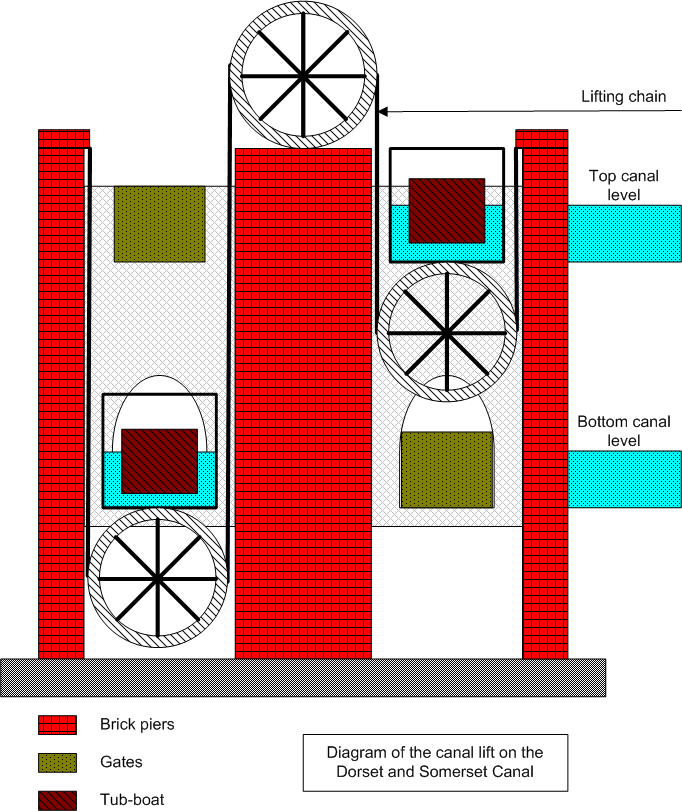
Diagram showing the arrangement of Fussell's boat lift

The Dorset and Somerset Canal was a proposed canal in southwestern England. The main line was intended to link Poole, Dorset with the Kennet and Avon Canal near Bradford on Avon, Wiltshire. A branch was to go from the main line at Frome to the southern reaches of the Somerset coalfield at Nettlebridge. Construction of the branch started in 1786, using boat lifts rather than locks to cope with changes of level, but the company ran out of money and the canal was abandoned in 1803, never to be completed.

== Proposals ==
Plans for a major canal to link Bristol and Poole, and therefore to make travel from the Bristol Channel to the English Channel easier and safer, were proposed in 1792. The suggested route passed through Wareham, Sturminster Newton, Wincanton and Frome, joining the River Avon at Bath. Collieries in the Mendips near Nettlebridge were to be served by a branch canal, while the main trade was seen as coal travelling southwards and clay travelling northwards. A public meeting was held in Wincanton in January 1793, at which a list of subscribers was started.

There were several proposals as to the precise route, and so the canal engineer Robert Whitworth was asked to survey a route. By the time he reported back in September 1793, the route started from the Kennet and Avon Canal at Freshford, Somerset, rather than Bath, and having passed through Stalbridge, headed for Blandford rather than Wareham. The new route reflected the availability of water to supply the canal. Whitworth was busy and recommended that the promoters of the scheme should employ William Bennet of Frome as engineer. Bennet completed a detailed survey in 1795, estimating that the cost of the canal would be about £200,000, and the promoters approved most of his plan at a meeting in July. Short branches to Hamworthy and Wareham were added to the scheme, and the proposed junction with the Kennet and Avon Canal was later moved to Widbrook.

Dorset and Wiltshire Canal Act 1796
- Act of Parliament
- Parliament of the United Kingdom
- Long title: An act for making a navigable canal from or near Gain's Cross, in the parish of Shillington Okeford, in the county of Dorset, to communicate with the Kennet and Avon canal, at or near Widbrook; in the county of Wilts, and also a certain navigable branch from the intended canal.
- Citation: 36 Geo. 3. c. 47
- Territorial extent: Great Britain

Dates
- Royal assent: 24 March 1796
- Commencement: 24 March 1796 (Note: The Acts of Parliament (Commencement) Act 1793.)
Other legislation
Amended by	Dorset and Somerset Canal Act 1803

Status: Current legislation

Text of statute as originally enacted

By the time parliamentary approval was sought, the southern end had been cut back to Shillingstone, to reduce the cost, and the Dorset and Wiltshire Canal Act 1796 (36 Geo. 3. c. 47) was obtained on 24 March 1796, giving the company powers to raise £150,000, with an additional £75,000 if required. However, with the social changes and inflation that was occurring at the time, less than £80,000 was raised. With this, the company decided to start with the branch to Frome, in order to capitalise on the lucrative markets in the coal fields and the clothing industry in Frome.

== Construction ==
Construction began on the branch line, and about 8 miles (13 km) of canal was built, from Stratton Common towards Frome, passing through Coleford and Vobster. The works included the three-arched Murtry Aqueduct over the Mells River in Vallis Vale, near Hapsford, a larger aqueduct at Coleford, and a tunnel at Goodeaves Farm, which was not completed.

Both the main line and the branch involved significant changes in level, and the act of Parliament had specified that conventional locks would be used on the main line, but that "caissons" would be used on the branch, which rose by 264 ft (80.5m) over its length. The idea of using vertical boat lifts was proposed by James Fussell, owner of the nearby Mells ironworks, and his particular design, known as a balance lock, was patented in 1798. It consisted of two tanks, joined by chains which passed over large wheels. Boats entered one or both of the caissons, which each had an extra chamber below the main caisson, and the chamber of the top caisson was filled with water to provide the extra weight needed to cause the lift to operate. Although different in detail to those later used successfully on the Grand Western Canal, it was essentially very similar.

Fussell built the first boat lift at Barrow Hill. It was designed to take 10-ton boats, lifting them by 20 feet (6.1 m), and was tested during September and October 1800. It was formally demonstrated on 13 October 1800, and the Bath Chronicle carried a glowing report 3 days later.

Dorset and Somerset Canal Act 1803
- Act of Parliament
- Parliament of the United Kingdom
- Long title: An Act for enabling the Company of Proprietors of the Dorset and Somerset Canal Navigation to raise a further Sum of Money towards completing the said Canal, and for altering and amending an Act passed in the thirty-sixth Year of the Reign of his present Majesty, for making and maintaining the said Navigation.
- Citation: 43 Geo. 3. c. cviii
- Territorial extent: Great Britain

Dates
- Royal assent: 4 July 1803
- Commencement: 4 July 1803
Other legislation
Amends	Dorset and Wiltshire Canal Act 1796

Status: Current legislation

Text of statute as originally enacted

Five more lifts were to be built on the Barrow Hill section, and works started on the pits for four of them, but the company ran out of money in 1802, with 1.7 miles (2.7 km) of canal still to be excavated and the boat lifts unfinished. Having consulted an engineer called Underhill, the company obtained a second act of Parliament, the Dorset and Somerset Canal Act 1803 (43 Geo. 3. c. cviii), to allow them to raise more money and to build railways instead of the canal if this would reduce the cost, but they were unable to raise any more finance. Construction ceased in 1803, and the canal was never completed.

== Today ==
Several features are still visible including a bridge that once carried the Edford to Stratton Common road over the canal and an aqueduct at Coleford, with two semi-circular arches nearly 33 feet (10 m) across and a similar height. The boat lift at Barrow Hill was the site of archaeological excavations in 2007. The three-arched aqueduct over the River Mells at Murtry Bottom still has some 56 feet (17 m) of retaining wall attached to it. A project to consider how best to conserve it has been aided by a grant from the Somerset Aggregates Levy Sustainability Fund.

Point	Coordinates (Links to map resources)	OS Grid Ref	Notes
Western end	51.237°N 2.481°W	ST665487	
Edford Bridge	51.239°N 2.476°W	ST668489	
Coleford Aqueduct	51.238°N 2.452°W	ST685488	
Vobster Bridge	51.243°N 2.420°W	ST707494	
Conduit Bridge	51.254°N 2.387°W	ST730506	
Trial balance lock	51.249°N 2.373°W	ST740500	
Murtry Aqueduct	51.247°N 2.342°W	ST762498	
Whatcombe Wall	51.243°N 2.329°W	ST771494	

== See also ==
- Canals of Great Britain
- History of the British canal system

== Bibliography ==
- Atthill, Robin (1964). Old Mendip. Newton Abbott: David and Charles. ISBN 978-0-7153-5171-0.
- Dunning, Robert (1983). A History of Somerset. Chichester: Phillimore & Co. ISBN 978-0-85033-461-6.
- Hadfield, Charles (1967). The Canals of South West England. David and Charles. ISBN 978-0-7153-4176-6.
- Toulson, Shirley (1984). The Mendip Hills: A Threatened Landscape. London: Victor Gollancz. ISBN 978-0-575-03453-2.
- Clew, Kenneth (1971). The Dorset & Somerset Canal. Newton Abbot: David and Charles. ISBN 978-0-7153-5228-1.
