= James Fussell =

James Fussell may refer to:

- James Fussell III (died 1755), father of Fussell IV, see Mells River
- James Fussell IV (1748–1832), iron magnate
