= Buckland Dinham =

Village in Somerset, England

Coordinates: 51.2620°N 2.3504°W

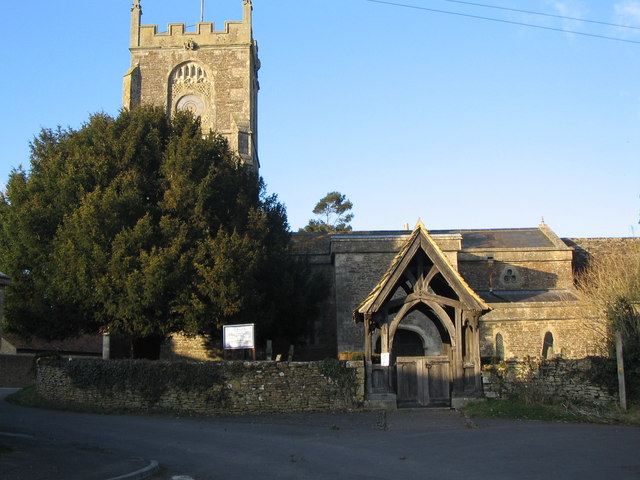
- St. Michael and All Angels

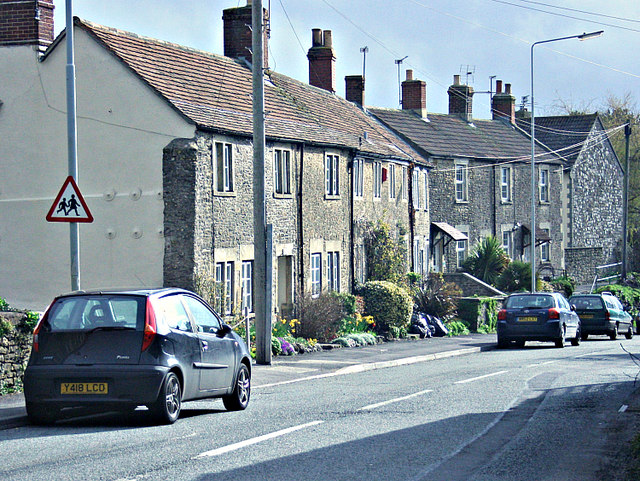
- Buckland Dinham

- Location within Somerset
- Population: 381 (2011)
- OS grid reference: ST755515
- Unitary authority: Somerset Council
- Ceremonial county: Somerset
- Region: South West
- Country: England
- Sovereign state: United Kingdom
- Post town: FROME
- Postcode district: BA11
- Dialling code: 01373
- Police: Avon and Somerset
- Fire: Devon and Somerset
- Ambulance: South Western
- UK Parliament: Frome and East Somerset

Buckland Dinham is a small village near Frome in Somerset, England. The village has a population of 381. The village's main industry is farming (arable and dairy), but the village is also a dormitory village for the nearby cities of Bath and Bristol.

== History ==
In 951, King Eadred granted land at Buckland to his relative Ælfhere.

The village used to be known as Buckland Denham. Denham is believed to be a family name (there are many other villages with Denham in their name) whilst Buckland may refer to a former deer population. Although Buckland Dinham itself does not have a manor house, it is close to Orchardleigh Estate.

There are signs of prehistoric archaeology. A hand axe has been found in Lower Street (which follows the spring line). Kingsdown Camp is an Iron Age hill fort. It is a Scheduled Ancient Monument. It is a univallate fort with an area of 0.15 hectares (0.37 acres), and is approximately quadrilateral in shape. In the Iron Age or Roman period a drystone wall was constructed, possibly 4 metres (13 ft) high and 2.5 metres (8 ft) wide. There is an entrance on the northeast side. The fort continued to be used by the Romans.

The parish of Buckland Denham was part of the Kilmersdon Hundred.

The Dorset and Somerset Canal's branch to the Somerset coalfields would have passed via the bottom end of the Buckland vale, had it ever been completed. It is now just off the route of NCR 24, the Colliers Way. The Murtry Aqueduct remains. Fussell's balance locks were built on the side of Barrow Hill, an extension of the hill on which Buckland Dinham is perched.

== Governance ==
The parish council has responsibility for local issues, including setting an annual precept (local rate) to cover the council's operating costs and producing annual accounts for public scrutiny. The parish council evaluates local planning applications and works with the local police, district council officers, and neighbourhood watch groups on matters of crime, security, and traffic. The parish council's role also includes initiating projects for the maintenance and repair of parish facilities, as well as consulting with the district council on the maintenance, repair, and improvement of highways, drainage, footpaths, public transport, and street cleaning. Conservation matters (including trees and listed buildings) and environmental issues are also the responsibility of the council.

For local government purposes, since 1 April 2023, the parish comes under the unitary authority of Somerset Council. Prior to this, it was part of the non-metropolitan district of Mendip (established under the Local Government Act 1972). It was part of Frome Rural District before 1974.

It is also part of the Frome and East Somerset county constituency represented in the House of Commons of the Parliament of the United Kingdom. It elects one Member of Parliament (MP) by the first past the post system of election.

== Geography ==
Geographically, the village is on the side of a hill (known as Buckland Down). It looks out over a vale formed by several small streams, in particular the Buckland Brook, which leads southwards towards Frome (and other villages such as Great Elm and Mells). The Buckland Brook skirts the north-eastern side of the village.

== Transport ==
It is on the A362 road from Radstock to Frome. Coming off this at the bottom of the hill is Lower Street, which subsequently turns uphill (as Sands Cross Hill) before looping back to the main road at the top of the village, opposite the Bell public house. Lanes also lead off to Lullington and Great Elm.

Buckland Dinham has never had a railway station, although the Great Western Railway branch from Frome to Radstock (and thence to Bristol) passes by the bottom of the valley. This is today unused by passenger trains, but limestone trains to Whatley Quarry use the line. They then seem to disappear into a clump of trees; in reality, a tunnel entrance is hidden, leading to Vallis Vale and the quarry.

== Religious sites ==
The Church of St. Michael has a nave, chancel, south chapel and south porch which dates from around 1200. The north chapel was added in 1325, and a further chapel to the north of the chancel and the west tower being added in 1480. It underwent restoration in the late 19th century. It has been designated as a Grade I listed building.
