= William Bennet (engineer) =

William Bennet (or Bennett) was an English civil engineer, noted for his work on canals. Nothing is known of his early life or family history, but details of his work from about 1790 until 1826 are documented. His major projects were for the Dorset and Somerset Canal and the Somersetshire Coal Canal.

== Early career ==
It is thought that Bennet originated in Lancashire, as his first recorded projects concerned surveying of an extension to the Manchester, Bolton and Bury Canal from Bolton to join the Leeds Liverpool Canal, then being proposed, and surveying of the Bury and Sladen Canal, to create a link to the Rochdale Canal. The surveys were completed in 1792, after which he surveyed a canal from Accrington to Bury, which although it obtained an Act of Parliament in 1794 to authorise its construction, was never built. During this period he met Robert Whitworth, who employed him for a time, and was influential in his move to projects in the South West.

== Major Projects ==
Whitworth had been approached by the Dorset and Somerset Canal Committee, with a view to him surveying that scheme, but felt that he was too busy with other work, and so recommended Bennet as a suitable alternative in 1793. Bennet was at the time busy with plans for the Ivelchester and Langport Navigation, and so did not complete the Dorset and Somerset plans until mid-1795. The committee rejected the final part of his route, which would have joined the Kennet and Avon Canal at Dundas Aqueduct, but accepted a revised route to Widbrook on 13 August 1795.

Bennet estimated the cost at £146,008, and presented evidence on the engineering aspects of the project, which enabled the committee to obtain an Act of Parliament in 1796. The scheme involved caisson locks, on which Robert Weldon held a patent, and although construction of the canal began in September 1796, Bennet deferred any work on the locks until the outcome of trials on the neighbouring Somersetshire Coal Canal were known. Since November 1795, Bennet had also been the engineer for that scheme.

It was estimated that the use of caisson locks could save the Somersetshire Canal Company around £10,000, but the trials were not successful. Bennet was consulted when the brickwork forming the lock walls started to bulge, but Benjamin Outram was approached in February 1800, and he recommended replacing the locks with an inclined plane. Bennet assessed Outram's proposal, and three other proposals for balance locks, by James Fussell, Norton and Whitmore. Although he wanted to proceed with a lock scheme, the decision to build an inclined plane was made in June 1800, but that was not a success. The Company obtained a new Act or Parliament in 1802 to authorise its replacement by a flight of conventional locks, but by 1806 it became evident that Bennet had underestimated the cost by a third, and he was dismissed.

On the Dorset and Somerset Canal, Bennet had to decide what to do when the lock trials showed the flaws in Weldon's caisson locks. He recommended locks based on a patent by James Fussell, and although the first trial was a success, the scheme ran out of money in 1802, and was never completed.

== Later life ==
Very little is known of his subsequent career. He was involved with an inclined plane from Bathampton Quarries to the Kennet and Avon Canal in 1808, and he worked with Robert Anstice advising on the River Axe drainage scheme, also in 1808. Between 1821 and 1825, he was resident in Eccles Green, Lancashire, and produced a report jointly with Thomas Tredgold in 1825, on using the route of the abortive Dorset and Somerset Canal for a railway.

== See also ==
- History of the British canal system
- Waterways in the United Kingdom
- List of civil engineers
