= Whatley, Mendip =

Village in Somerset, England

Coordinates: 51.227°N 2.378°W

Whatley
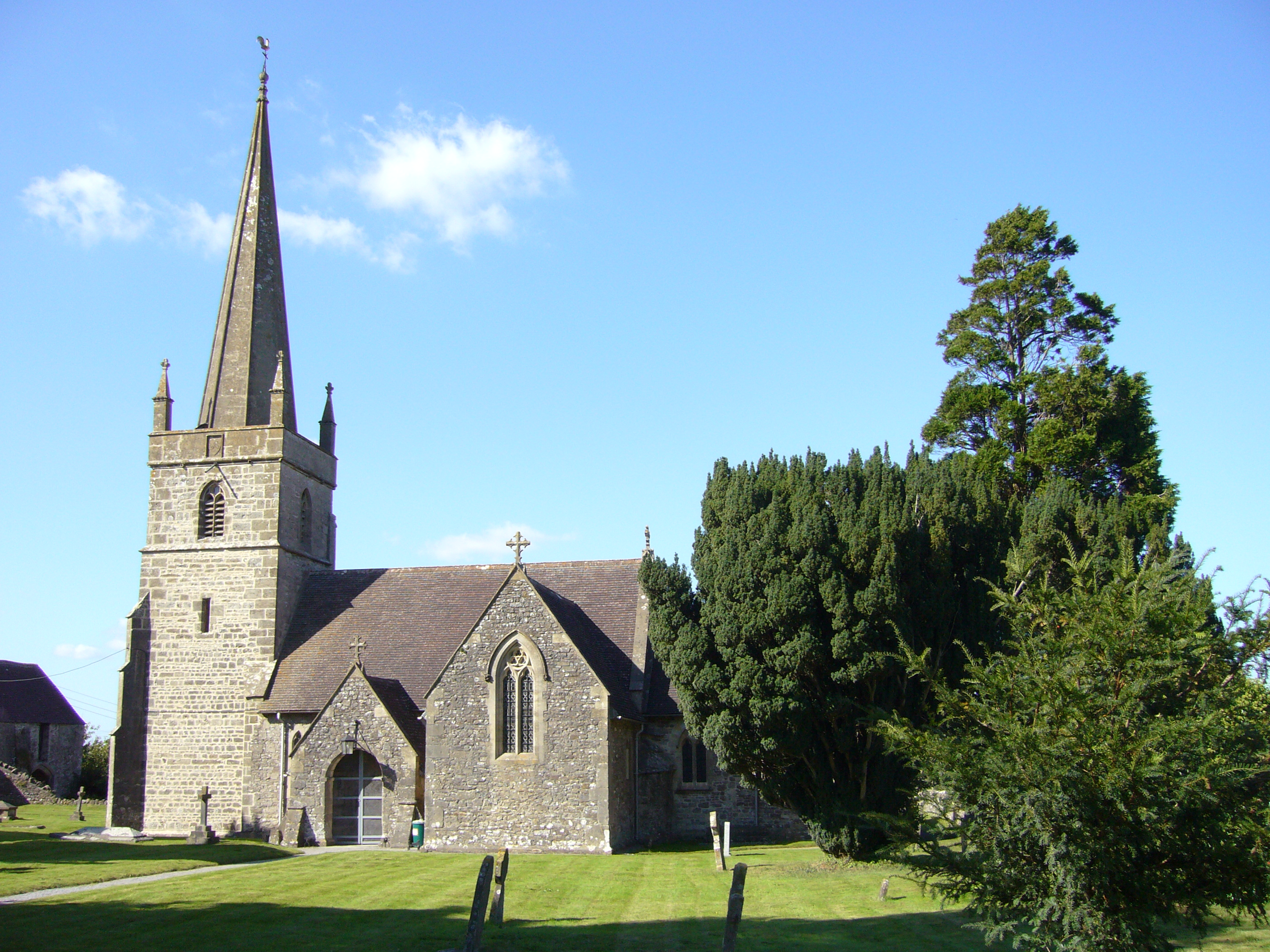
- St George's Church

- Location within Somerset
- Population: 245 (2011)
- OS grid reference: ST731479
- Unitary authority: Somerset Council
- Ceremonial county: Somerset
- Region: South West
- Country: England
- Sovereign state: United Kingdom
- Post town: FROME
- Postcode district: BA11
- Dialling code: 01373
- Police: Avon and Somerset
- Fire: Devon and Somerset
- Ambulance: South Western
- UK Parliament: Frome and East Somerset

Whatley is a small rural village and civil parish about 2.5 miles (4 km) west of Frome in the English county of Somerset. The parish lies south of Mells and north of Nunney, and includes the hamlets of Lower Whatley and Chantry.

== History ==
According to Robinson, it was called Watelei in the Domesday Book of 1086, when the tenants of the Abbot of Glastonbury Abbey were Walter Hussey and John the Usher. He suggests the village name means 'The wet meadow' from the Old English woet and leah. The parish was part of the hundred of Frome.

The village gives its name to Whatley Quarry, which lies to the north-west of the village at grid reference ST731479 and is said to be one of the largest in Europe. It is owned by Hanson plc and has been the object of protests against its impact on the environment.

The gatehouse at Manor farm was built around 1500 and is a Grade I listed building.

The hamlet of Lower Whatley is to the south of the village.

The hamlet of Chantry lies 1 mile to the west. It is one of the Thankful Villages which suffered no casualties in the First World War. The village was featured on Darren Hayman's album, Thankful Villages Volume 2.

Chantry Park is Grade II* listed: The Chantry is a neoclassical villa built c. 1825 to the design of Bath architect John Pinch the elder. The Chantry Estate and school were established by the family of James Fussell, an iron magnate operating the Old Iron Works, Mells in Vallis Vale between Mells and Great Elm.

== Governance ==
The parish council has responsibility for local issues, including setting an annual precept (local rate) to cover the council's operating costs and producing annual accounts for public scrutiny. The parish council evaluates local planning applications and works with the local police, district council officers, and neighbourhood watch groups on matters of crime, security, and traffic. The parish council's role also includes initiating projects for the maintenance and repair of parish facilities, as well as consulting with the district council on the maintenance, repair, and improvement of highways, drainage, footpaths, public transport, and street cleaning. Conservation matters (including trees and listed buildings) and environmental issues are also the responsibility of the council.

For local government purposes, since 1 April 2023, the village comes under the unitary authority of Somerset Council. Prior to this, it was part of the non-metropolitan district of Mendip, which was formed on 1 April 1974 under the Local Government Act 1972, having previously been part of Frome Rural District.

It is also part of the Frome and East Somerset county constituency represented in the House of Commons of the Parliament of the United Kingdom. It elects one Member of Parliament (MP) by the first past the post system of election, and was part of the South West England constituency of the European Parliament prior to Britain leaving the European Union in January 2020, which elected seven MEPs using the d'Hondt method of party-list proportional representation.

== Religious sites ==
The Church of the Holy Trinity at Chantry dates from 1844–46 by George Gilbert Scott and William Moffatt, with further work by William George Brown of Frome, for James Fussell, who owned the local iron works. It is a Grade I listed building. In 1858 Richard William Church was among the clergy of the church. The Church of St George in Whatley dates from the 14th century. There is a sarsen stone in the church which may have pagan origins. The parish is part of the benefice of Mells with Buckland Dinham, Chantry, Great Elm and Whatley within the Diocese of Bath and Wells.

== Gallery of images ==
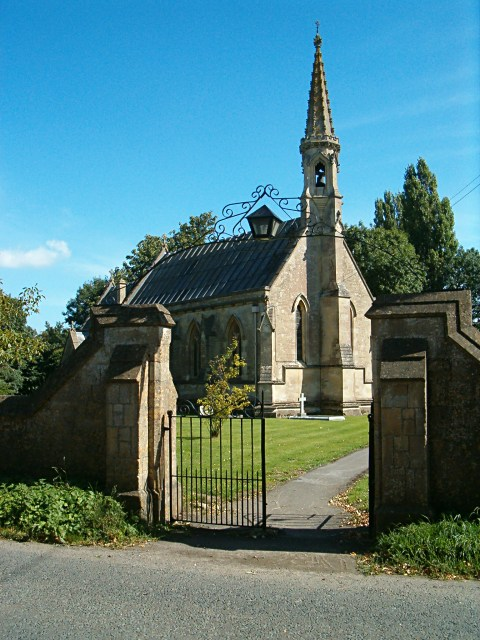
Holy Trinity Church

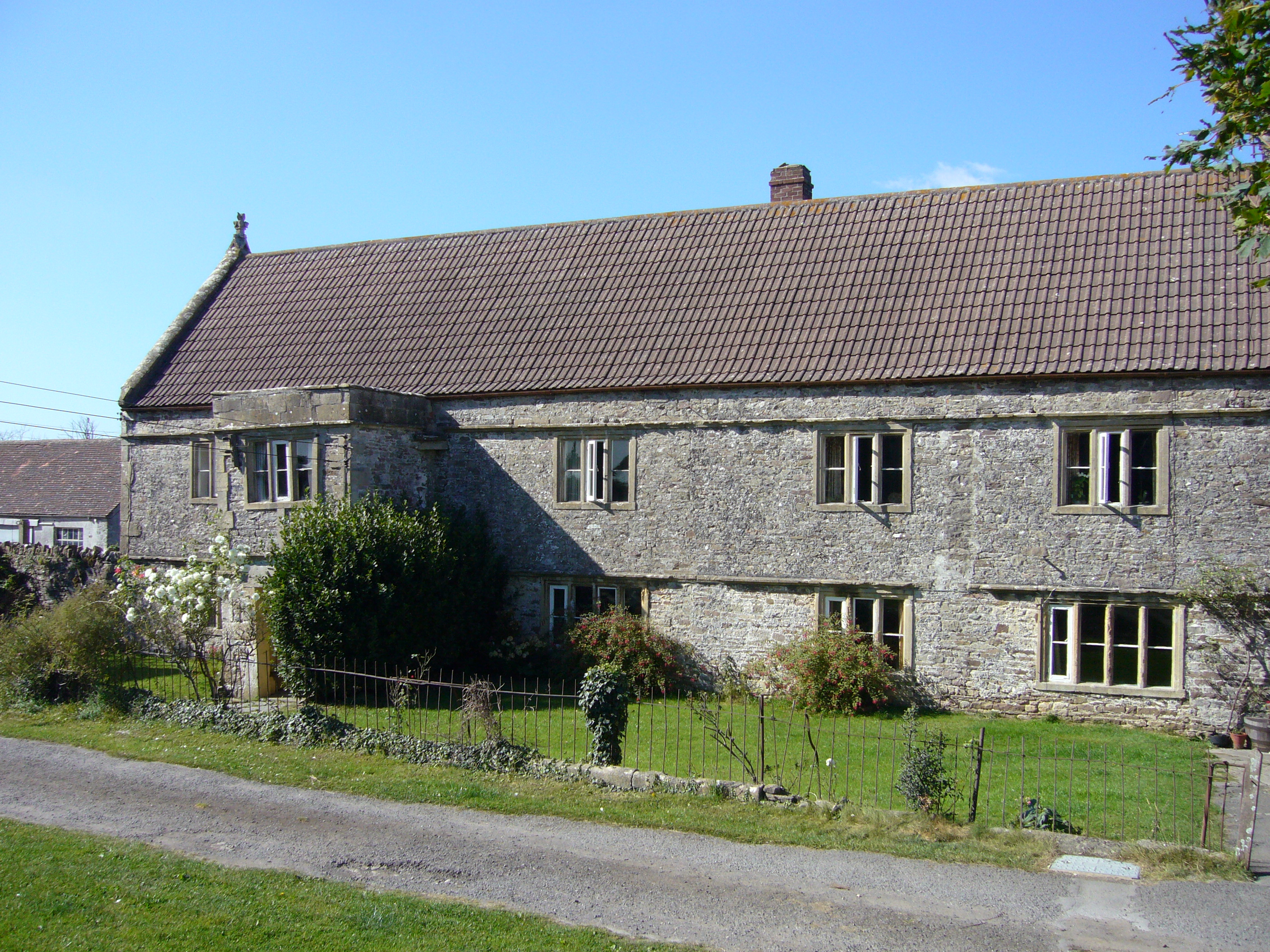
Old house near the church

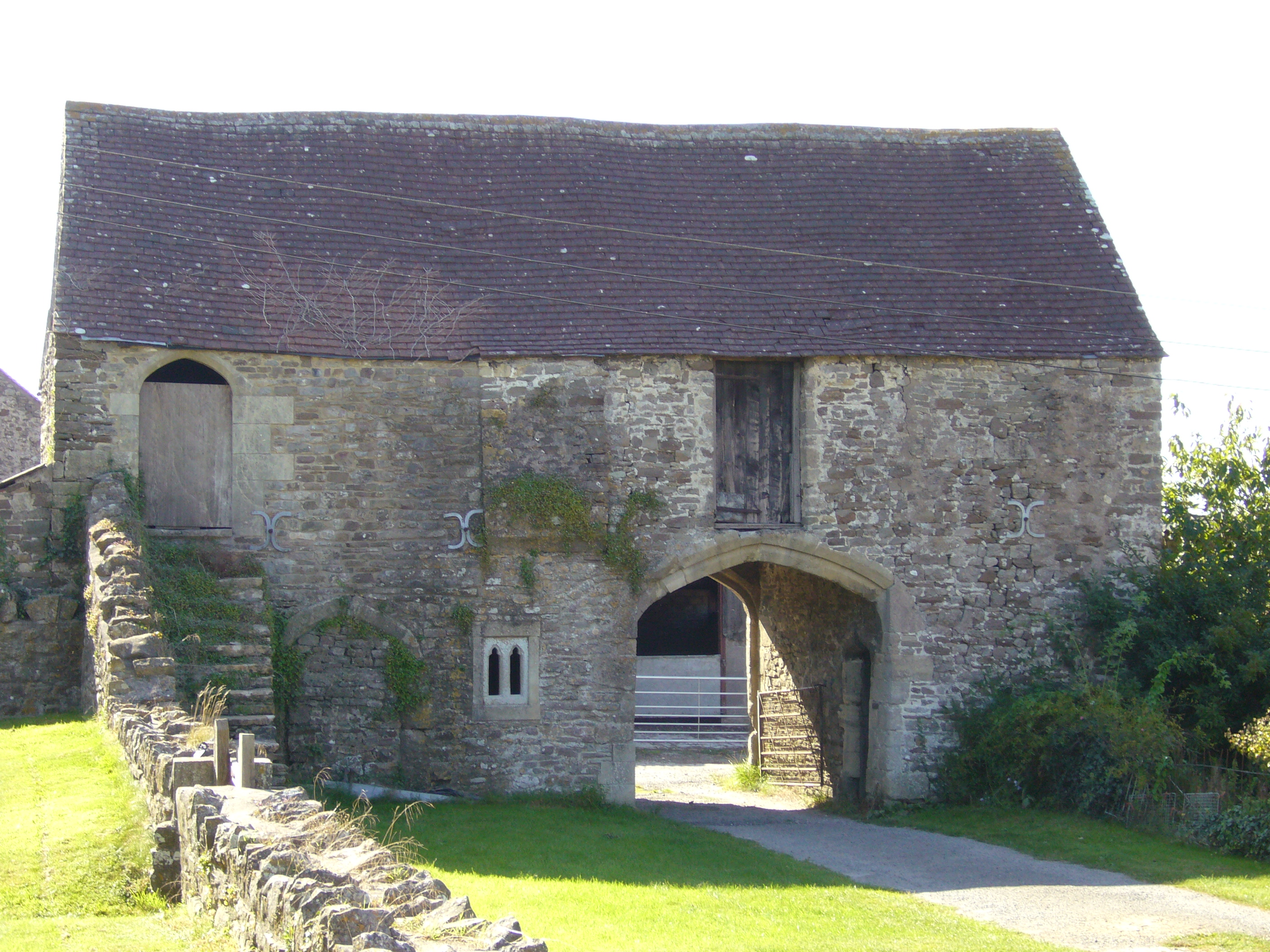
Old gatehouse/barn near the church

== See also ==
- Ellen Buckingham Mathews, novelist
