= St Paul's Church, Bristol =

Church in Bristol, England

St Paul's Church
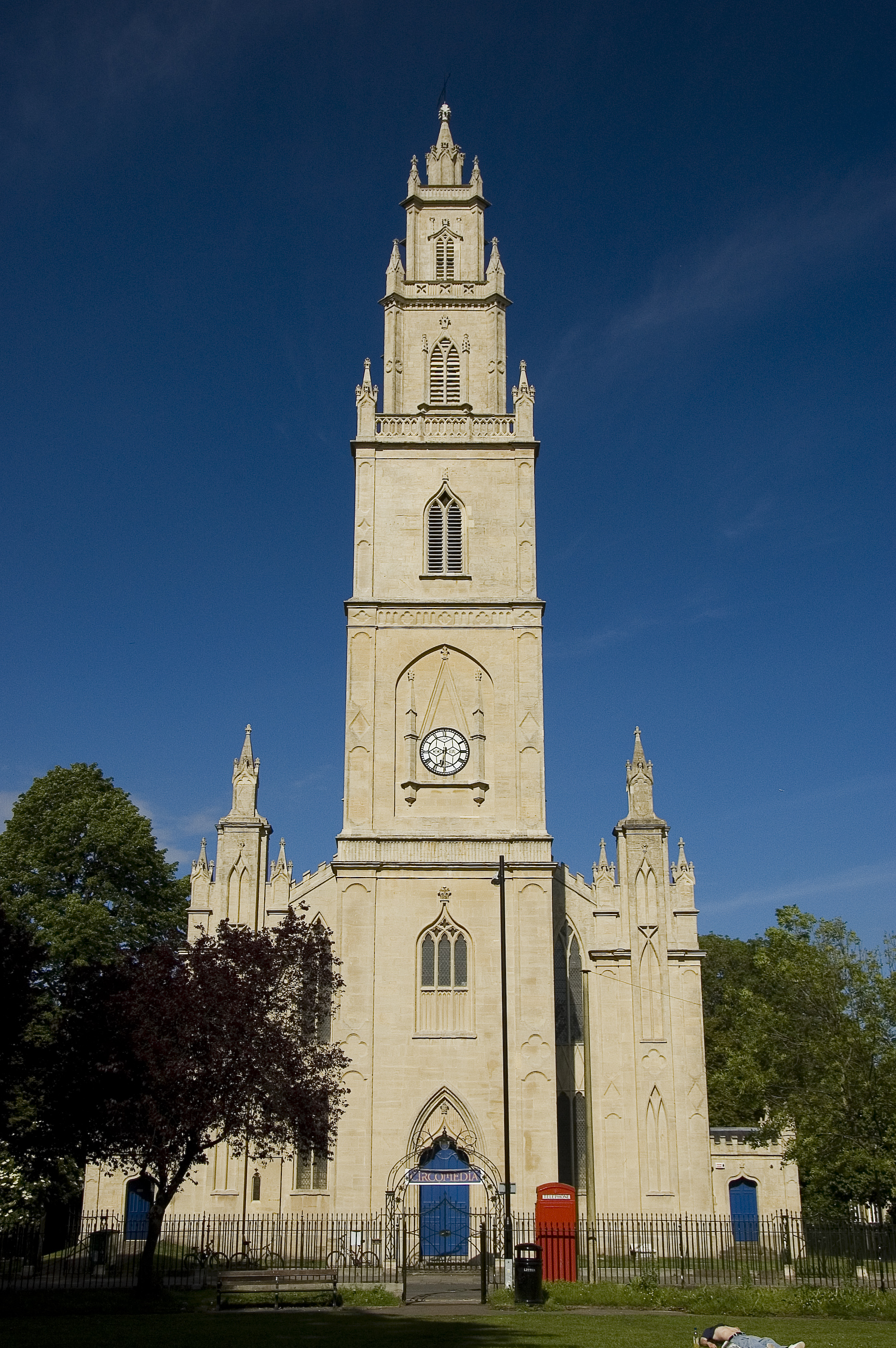
- St Paul's Church

- Location within Bristol

General information
- Location: Bristol, England
- Coordinates: 51.46114°N 2.58472°W
- Construction started: 1789
- Completed: 1794

Design and construction
- Architect: Daniel Hague

St Paul's Church, a redundant church, gives its name to the surrounding St Paul's area of Bristol, England. It was built in the 1790s but fell into disuse and disrepair by its closure in 1988. It is recorded in the National Heritage List for England as a designated Grade I listed building.

Major renovation work was undertaken to repair and convert the building for use as a performance space and circus skills school Circomedia.

== Building ==
It is in the Georgian Portland Square. It was designed by Daniel Hague although the original St Paul's Church was to be designed by James Allen in a Greek style. Work was started on the church in 1789 and completed in 1794. St Paul's became known as the Wedding Cake Church from the unusual tiered tower. The tower was designed to hold a ring of ten bells, however only four bells were purchased, all cast by John Rudhall of Gloucester, two in 1792 and the 6th and tenor bells of the proposed ring in 1795. The tenor bell is still hung for full-circle ringing, and the other bells were removed and are now hung in other churches - the two smaller bells are now at St Michael's, Buckland Dinham and St. John's, Wagga Wagga, and the second largest is now the tenor bell at St. James', Sydney.

The gates and railings are a grade II* listed building.

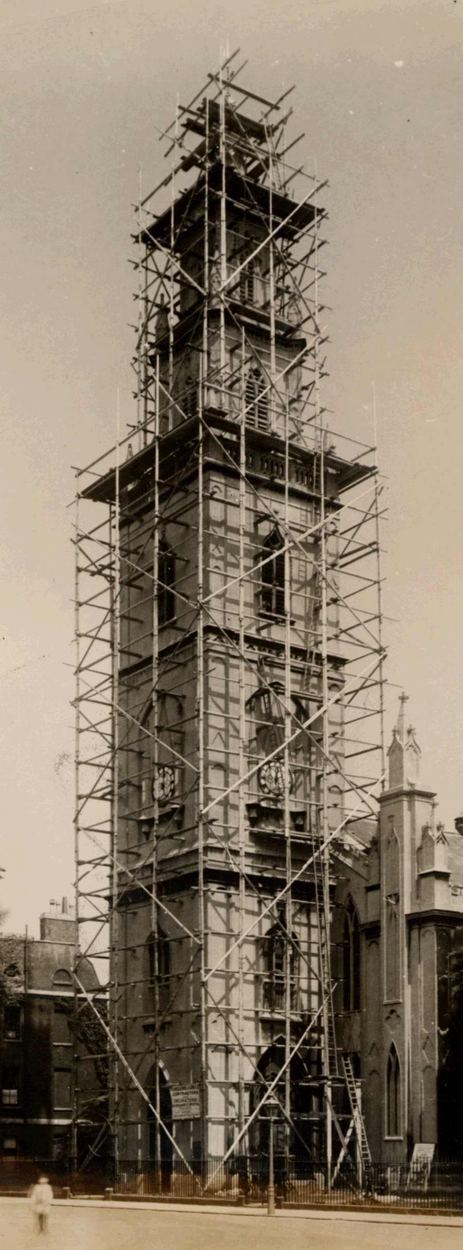
Black and white photograph of St Paul's Church, Portland Square, Bristol, UK from 1926, showing the distinctive tower covered in scaffolding for maintenance and repair. The shot is from the south west of the church, and there is a small blurred figure in the foreground.

== Closure and redevelopment ==
As the residential population of the area decreased (houses were converted into offices) the congregation declined; the church closed in 1988 in a state of disrepair and was boarded up for many years. A lot of damage was caused by swollen ironwork exploding the Bath Stone and water leaking in, causing erosion to the plaster ceilings.

About £2.3 million from the Heritage Lottery Fund funded the restoration and conversion work. The church is now a redundant church in the care of the Churches Conservation Trust. It was declared redundant on 1 November 1988, and was vested in the Trust on 1 April 2000.

In 2005 the church building was converted into its present form as the home of Circomedia, a circus school, but remains consecrated. It still boasts an ornate Georgian plaster ceiling, stone columns and a wealth of decorative stained glass, but has now been equipped with aerial and trapeze equipment and a pale Maple wood sprung dance floor.

On 19 October 2007, it won the international RICS Community Benefit Award 2007. St Paul's was chosen as the winner by judges because of the transformation it has undergone under the Churches Conservation Trust.

== Archives ==
Parish records for St Paul's church, Portland Square, Bristol are held at Bristol Archives (Ref. P. St P) (online catalogue) including baptism, marriage and burial registers. The archive also includes records of the incumbent, churchwardens, parochial church council, charities, and vestry plus plans and deeds.

== Gallery ==
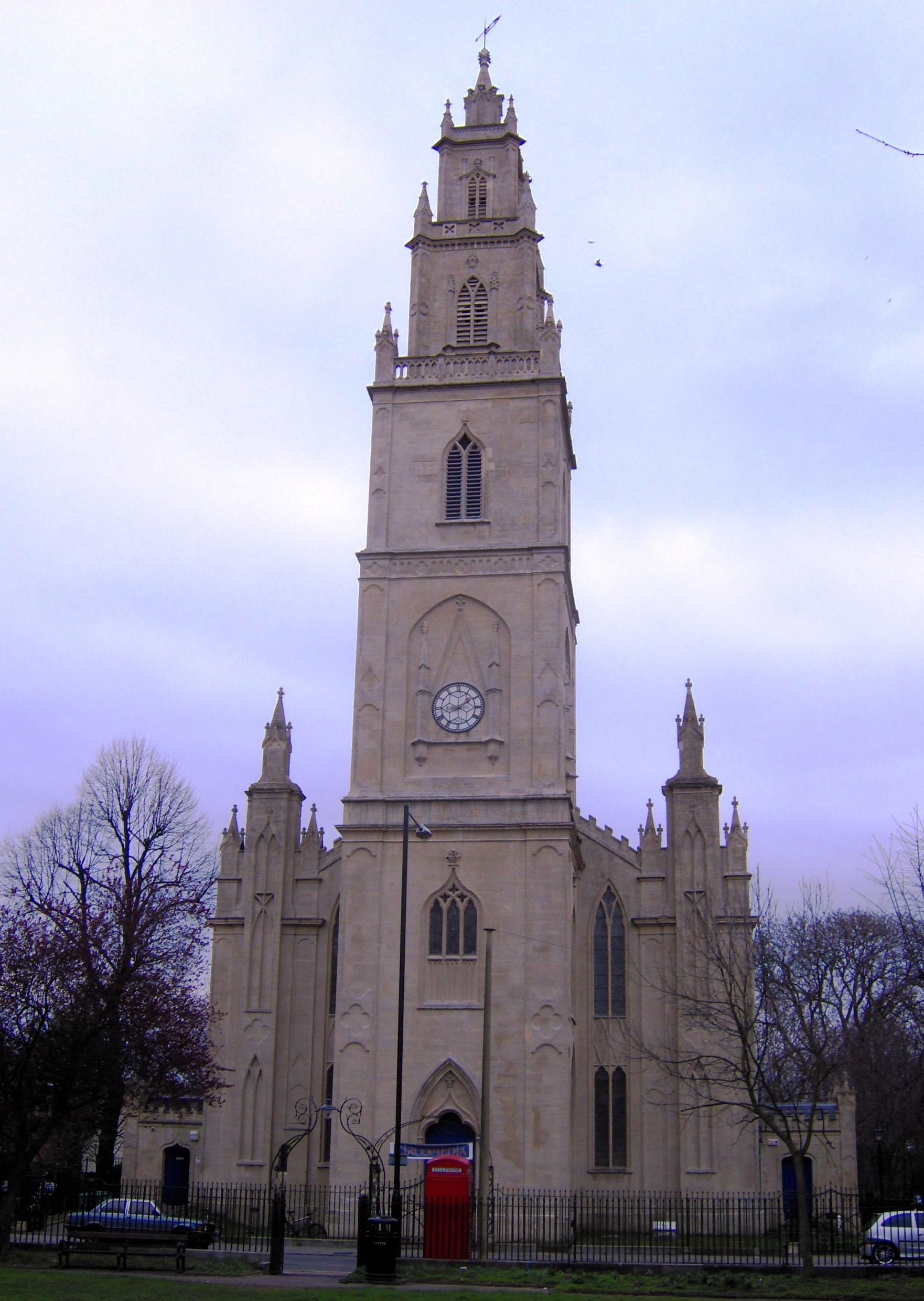
Front of the church

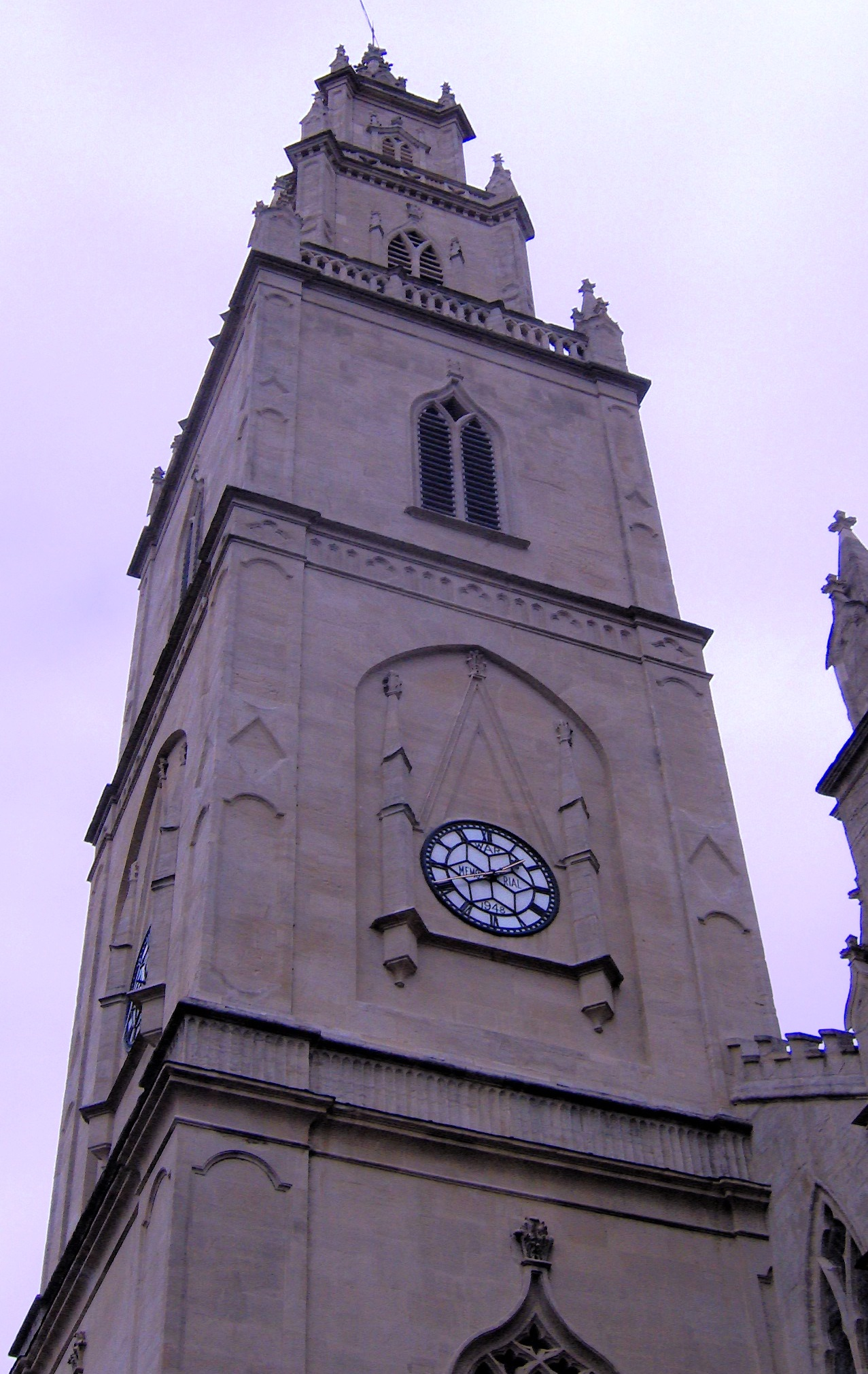
The tower

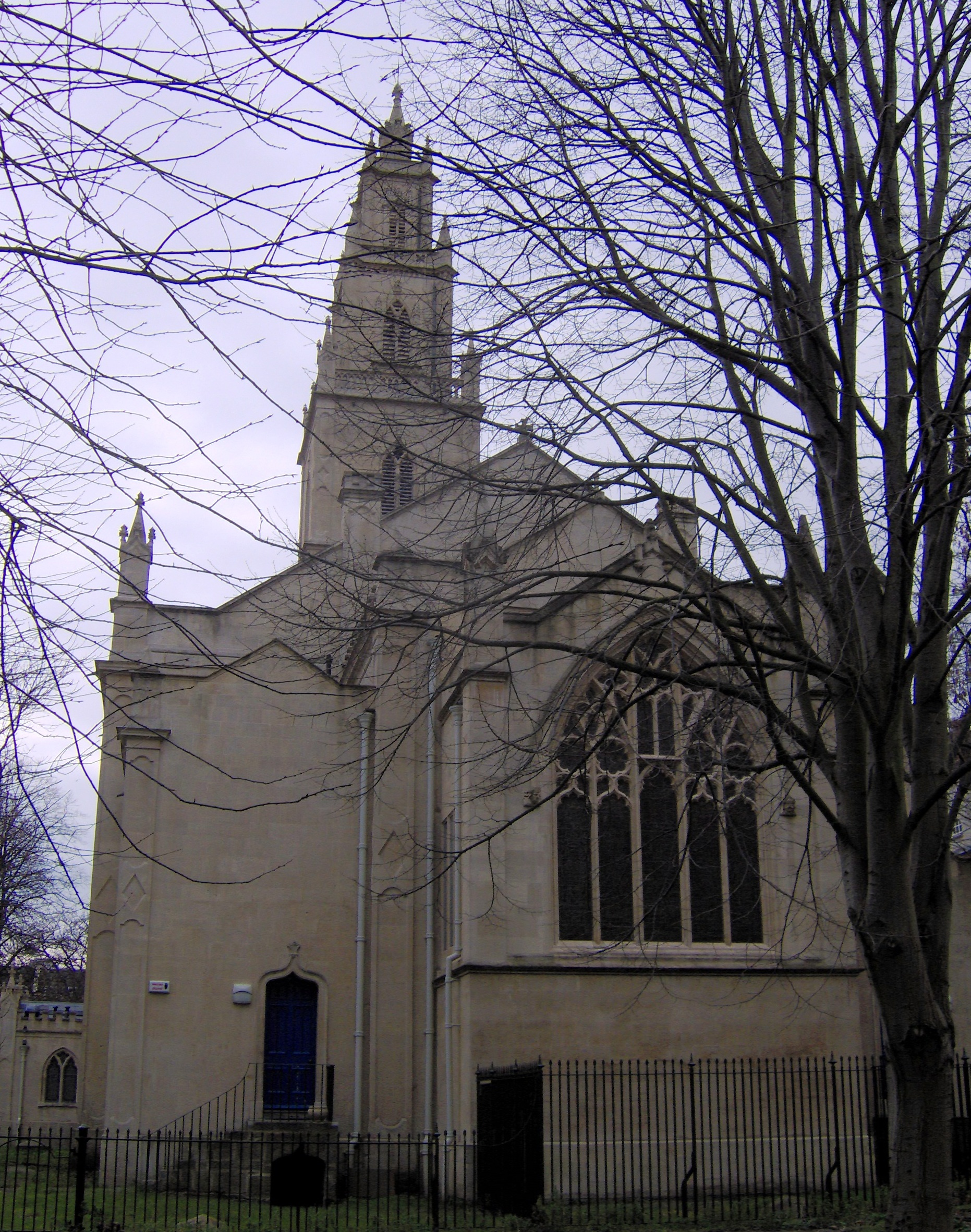
The rear of the church taken from St Paul's Park

== See also ==
- List of churches preserved by the Churches Conservation Trust in South West England
