= Ian Partridge =

English lyric tenor (born 1938)

Ian Partridge CBE (born 12 June 1938) is a retired English lyric tenor, whose repertoire ranged from Monteverdi, Bach and Handel, the Elizabethan lute songs, German, French and English songs, through to Schoenberg, Weill and Britten, and on to contemporary works. He formed a renowned vocal-piano duo with his sister Jennifer Partridge, with whom he worked for over 50 years. While concentrating mainly on songs, oratorio and lieder, he also recorded opera, and has an extensive discography. He is now a teacher and adjudicator, and conducts master classes in many countries.

== Biography ==
Ian Harold Partridge was born in 1938 in Wimbledon. He was a chorister at New College, Oxford 1948–52, and a music scholar at Clifton College. He studied at the Royal College of Music from 1956, studying piano and voice. Leaving after a year because he had engaged in paid employment, which was banned by the RCM, he transferred to the Guildhall School of Music and Drama, where his voice teachers were Norman Walker and Roy Hickman; he also studied conducting under Aylmer Buesst. During this period, he appeared in the West End production of John Osborne's Luther. From 1958 to 1962 he sang in the Westminster Cathedral Choir, where he worked on plainchant with George Malcolm. He also worked for some time as a piano accompanist. He took further instruction from Benjamin Britten and Peter Pears.

He made his debut in 1958 at Bexhill in Handel's Messiah, and commenced a solo singing career in 1962. He formed a renowned vocal-piano duo with his sister Jennifer Partridge, with whom he performed over 430 recitals over 52 years. On one occasion in Syria, the hall was sold out, until the audience discovered the performers were not The Partridge Family. In 1967, he recorded for EMI Records Ltd, with the Choir of King's College, Cambridge and the English Chamber Orchestra, conducted by David Willcocks, the Charpentier's "Messe de Minuit" for Christmas H.9

Partridge appeared only once in opera, but at Covent Garden, singing the role of Iopas in Berlioz's Les Troyens conducted by Sir Colin Davis, which he later recorded.

In 1973, his recording of Schubert's Die schöne Müllerin, which was the first time the cycle had been recorded on a single 33 rpm LP record, was voted Best Record by Record Review. In 1977, he recorded for EMI Records Ltd, with the Choir of King's College, Cambridge and the Academy of St. Martin-in-the-Fields, conducted by Philip Ledger, the Charpentier's Te Deum H.146.

He sang the title role in the Thames Television production of Benjamin Britten's Saint Nicolas, which won the 1977 Prix Italia. With Pierre Boulez, Partridge recorded Schoenberg's Die Jakobsleiter, Schumann's Der Rose Pilgerfahrt and Stravinsky's Le Rossignol.

Ian Partridge has appeared in recital and concert in many countries. He collaborated with the actress Prunella Scales in over 350 performances of "An Evening with Queen Victoria" all over the world, singing songs composed by Prince Albert. He has performed Walton's Façade at the Concertgebouw in Amsterdam with the composer's widow Lady Walton.

He has been President of the Incorporated Society of Musicians. He was appointed a Commander of the Order of the British Empire (CBE) in the 1992 New Year's Honours for services to music. He gave his farewell recital on 9 October 2008 at the Oxford Lieder Festival.

From 1996-2002 Partridge was a director of PAMRA (Performing Artists Media Rights Association), a UK not-for-profit organisation set up in 1996 as a result of EU directive 92/100/EEC, Article 8(2), which gave performers the right to receive "equitable remuneration". Prior to this, “non-featured artists” (including orchestral players and choral singers) did not receive royalties when their performances were broadcast or played in public. By 2002 PAMRA had more than 15,000 members and was paying out millions of pounds in royalties to rank-and-file musicians.

He has conducted masterclasses on Lieder, English Song and Early Music, at Aldeburgh, Vancouver, Ravinia, Trondheim, Versailles and Helsinki. He continues to lead residential singing weekends, such as his annual course at Jackdaws Music Education Trust and has been a professor at the Royal Academy of Music since 1996.

On 13 September 2016, Partridge was the focus of the BBC Radio 4 programme Voices of....

His voice appears on Vol. 5 of The Record of Singing.
