= Murtry Aqueduct =

Grade II listed aqueduct in the United kingdom

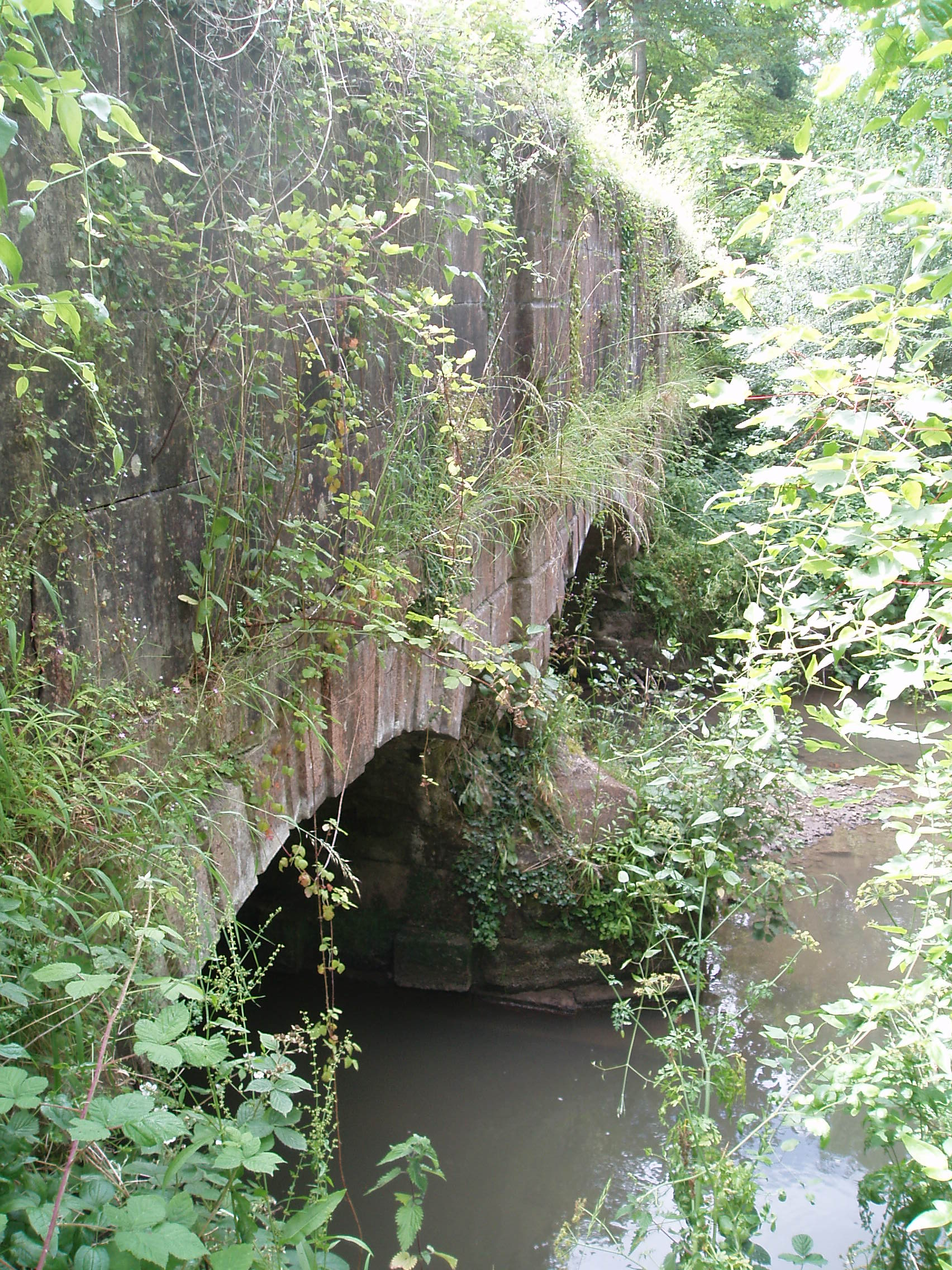
- The north face of Murtry Aqueduct
- Coordinates: 51.247°N 2.342°W
- Carries: Dorset and Somerset Canal
- Crosses: Mells River
- Locale: Great Elm
- Maintained by: Dorset & Somerset Canal Society
- Heritage status: Grade II

Characteristics
- Pier construction: Doulting Stone
- Total length: 70 feet (21.3 m)
- Water depth: 5.6 feet (1.7 m)
- Longest span: 20 feet (6.1 m)
- No. of spans: 3
- Piers in water: 2

History
- Construction end: c.1795

Murtry Aqueduct is a three-arched aqueduct that was intended to carry the Dorset and Somerset Canal over the Mells River, near Frome in Somerset, England. It is a grade II listed building.

== Construction ==
The aqueduct was built as part of an 8-mile branch of the canal between Frome and Nettlebridge. This branch was never completed and work on the rest of the canal was never started, so Murtry Aqueduct was never filled with water. The aqueduct has some decorative architectural features, including rusticated spandrels and plain pilasters between the arches.

At the east end there is a skew arch, smaller than the three main arches, running underneath the canal bed. This skew arch is part of the aqueduct's south face, but it is separated from the aqueduct on the north side.

== See also ==
- Dorset and Somerset Canal
- List of canal aqueducts in Great Britain
