= St Edmund's Church, Vobster =

Former church in Somerset, England

St Edmund's Church
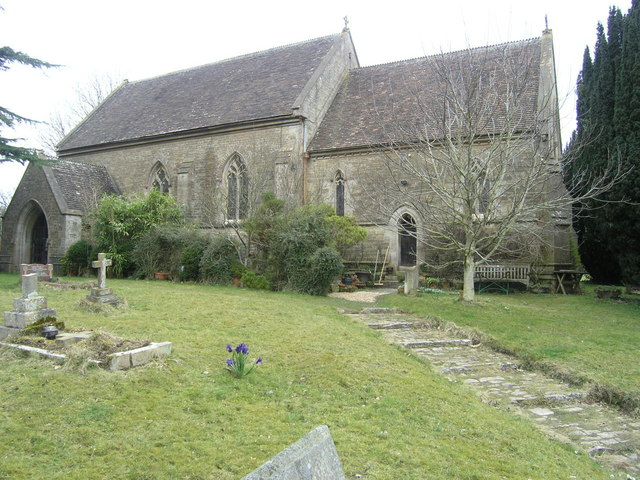
- The former St Edmund's in 2006.

Religion
- Affiliation: Church of England
- Ecclesiastical or organizational status: Redundant
- Year consecrated: 1848

Location
- Location: Vobster, Somerset, England
- Interactive map of St Edmund's Church
- Coordinates: 51.2418°N 2.4245°W

Architecture
- Architect: Benjamin Ferrey
- Type: Church

St Edmund's Church is a former Church of England church in Vobster, Somerset, England. It was built between 1845 and 1848 to the designs of Benjamin Ferrey and closed as a place of worship in 1981. The former church is now in part studio and part residential use and is a Grade II listed building.

== History ==
St Edmund's was built as a chapel of ease to serve the village of Vobster, in the parish of Mells. Construction of the church commenced in 1845 to the designs of Benjamin Ferrey. The pulpit and font of Caen stone were completed in 1847 by Mr. Rowe of St Sidwells, Exeter. The church was consecrated by the Bishop of Bath and Wells, the Right Rev. Richard Bagot, on 1 November 1848.

=== Closure and subsequent use (1981–) ===
By the 1980s, the church's congregation had dropped to three or four regular members and it was closed as a place of worship in 1981. The Church of England formally declared the church redundant on 1 August 1983. It was subsequently put up for sale, minus the churchyard, by the Church Commissioners for £10,000 through Cluttons of Wells, where it received interest from several parties wishing to convert it into a home.

In April 1985, local residents launched a campaign led by Frome businessman Roy Withers to save the church, either by encouraging the diocese to reopen it or by raising the funds to purchase it for community use, thereby preventing it from being used for storage or being bought by a developer. Campaigners argued that the village's population had grown since the church's closure and a letter was sent to the Bishop of Bath and Wells calling for the church to be reinstated.

On 14 September 1985, a meeting was held at the church by church leaders, including the Archdeacon of Bath and the Archdeacon of Wells, to allow residents to present their case. The meeting was attended by approximately 70 residents and concluded that the church could reopen if the village proved it had the resources to run it. Campaigners intended to raise the necessary funds, which at the time of its closure was an estimated £12,000 for repairs and improvement work.

After the attempt to raise funds and reopen the church failed, a new scheme was put forward in 1987 to convert the building into a photographic studio, which received the approval of local residents. Mendip District Council approved the plans on 4 August 1987 and the building was subsequently converted into Vobster Church Studio. A darkroom and printing room were formed within the nave; all of the pews were removed, but the church's font, pulpit and the stained glass in the chancel were retained. A change of use was approved in 1996 to convert part of the studio into a living area. In 2014, retrospective permission was granted for the creation of a new lobby and washroom on the ground floor, the extension of the first floor library and the addition of a new second floor as a bedroom.

== Architecture ==
St Edmund's is built of coursed and squared Doulting stone. It is made up of a two-bay nave, two-bay chancel, north vestry and south porch.
