= Mells River =

River in Somerset, England

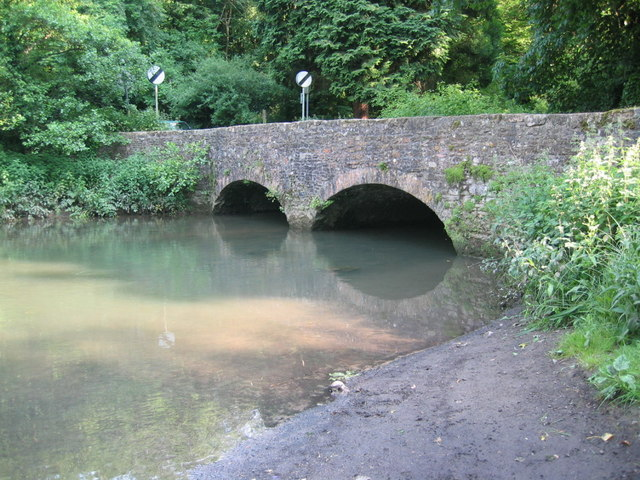
- Bridge over the Mells River at Great Elm

Location
- Country: England
- County: Somerset
- Cities: Gurney Slade, Mells, Great Elm, Frome

Physical characteristics
- Source
  - location: Somerset, England
  - elevation: 2 m (6 ft 7 in)
- Mouth: River Frome
  - location: Frome, Somerset, England
  - coordinates: 51°14′50″N 2°19′14″W

Basin features
- Tributaries
  - right: Finger Stream, Whatley Brook, Nunney Brook

The Mells River flows through the eastern Mendip Hills in Somerset, England. It rises at Gurney Slade and flows east joining the River Frome at Frome.

The river forms one of the boundaries of Mells Park, a country house estate in Mells. A few kilometres downstream it flows between the pre-Roman fortifications of Wadbury Camp to the north and Tedbury Camp to the south. The river flows through the western part of the Harridge Woods nature reserve.

Mells River also powered the Old Ironstone Works and several other mills set up by James Fussell III in 1744. It is now a 0.25 hectare biological Site of Special Scientific Interest, as it is used by both Greater and Lesser Horseshoe Bats.

Vobster Inn Bridge, which carries the lane over the Mells River, is dated 1764 and is Grade II listed. At Great Elm the Murtry Aqueduct, built around 1795, carried the Dorset and Somerset Canal over the river.

The river takes the outfall from Whatley Quarry. Downstream of the outfall is the Mells River Sink. This acts as a spring when the water table is high and as a sink into underground aquifers, through the Limestone, when the water table is low. Water tracing showed this to be part of an underground part of the river 2.5 kilometres (1.6 mi) long. Archaeological investigations found the remains of woolly rhinoceros bones and a 1st-century bronze brooch.
