= Caisson lock =

Type of canal lock

Operation of caisson lock

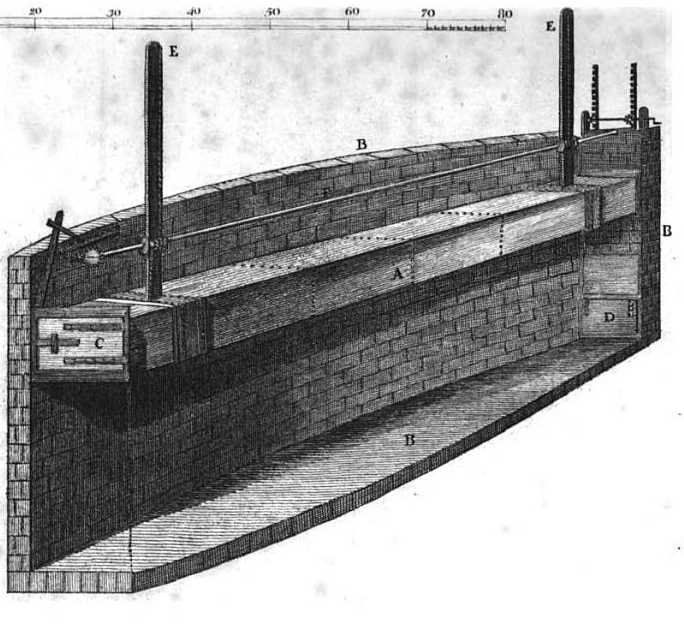
Contemporary engraving of the lock at Combe Hay, Somerset

The caisson lock is a type of canal lock in which a narrowboat is floated into a sealed watertight box and raised or lowered between two different canal water levels. It was invented in the late 18th century as a solution to the problem posed by the excessive demand for water when conventional locks were used to raise and lower canal boats through large height differences. Such locks, each of which would only raise and lower boats through small height differences of a few feet, would not suffice when large height differences had to be tackled nor when water was in short supply. The caisson (or caisoon) was thought to be one solution, although it transpired that the technology of the day was not capable of achieving this type of construction economically.

It was designed primarily as a water-saving measure, and also was an attempt to minimise construction costs compared with other engineering solutions of the time. In use, it was capable of replacing up to seven conventional locks. Another benefit was increased speed of boat descent/ascent.

== History ==
The caisson lock was first demonstrated at Oakengates on a now lost section of the Shropshire Canal in England in 1792, where its inventor, Robert Weldon (c.1754–1810) built a half-scale model. He claimed that his design would solve the problem of water supply in dry seasons or at greater elevations, be cheaper than building aqueducts or tunnels, and be quicker to operate than the number of surface locks his design could replace. He patented his invention as the 'Hydrostatick Caisson Lock'. The full-sized box, or "trunk", would probably have displaced about 270 tonnes and weighed about 170 tonnes, including the water in it, so about 100 tonnes of ballast would have been needed to give neutral buoyancy. The box would have needed to be strong enough to withstand the pressure of 50 ft (15 m) of water when at the bottom of the chamber, i.e. about 22 psi (150 kPa) gauge pressure.

The first lock was completed in 1797 under Weldon's supervision. The device was demonstrated to the Prince Regent (later George IV), but was found to suffer from various engineering defects, possibly caused by the soft fuller's earth rock stratum in the area.

== Method of operation ==
The system depended on the submerged, sealed box (the "caisson", from the French for "large chest") being heavily ballasted to achieve neutral buoyancy, so it was never possible in ordinary operation to lift it to water level to allow a descending boat to float in. Instead, a masonry chamber ("cistern") was built with walls higher than the water level in the top pound and itself filled completely with water, so that even at its upper position the box remained below the surface.

== Abandonment ==
The May 1799 test at Oakengates carried a party of investors aboard the vessel, who nearly suffocated before they could be freed. Work on the second lock was suspended (the third lock had not been started) and early in the following year an inclined plane, to carry boats' cargoes in wheeled tubs, was built instead. Eventually, a flight of nineteen locks on a longer alignment up the slope was constructed, with a Boulton & Watt steam pumping station, capable of lifting 5,000 tons of water in 12 hours, to recirculate the water.

== Other installations ==
In April 1815, the Regents Canal Company built a double caisson lock (or "hydro-pneumatic lock") at the site of the present-day Hampstead Road Lock, north London. The designer was military engineer William Congreve. Here the motivation was, principally, water supply issues but also to effect a quicker passage of vessels, as those going in opposite directions could pass in the lock. The caissons—always submerged, as at Combe Hay—were without bottoms and were arranged so that their sides dropped into deep underwater channels formed by "minor walls" inside the main walls. The vertical movement of the two caissons was effected by a balance pipe ("the channel of communication") passing under the lock floor between the two caisson chambers (but with a slight upturn to reach above the water levels), so that causing an increase of water level in one caisson ("the water of compression") displaced air through the pipe, thus forcing a corresponding decrease in the water level in the other. This increased the buoyancy of the latter caisson, which accordingly rose as the first sank.

A connecting underwater chain passing through rollers, while not in itself doing any work, controlled the relative positions. Boats were admitted through double gates; the inside ones on the caisson "adjusted to fit close [sic] to those of the outer". Congreve's patent then envisaged that, having achieved "absolute equipoise" (neutral buoyancy), a rack-and-pinion, removable weights or a small winch could overcome inertia and move the caissons. In a practical demonstration at Hampstead Road, Congreve later elected to deploy an air compressor releasing into one caisson, estimating that one man could achieve raising and lowering in three minutes—the company's enabling act did not permit the installation of stationary steam engines. However it was found the fastest overall time was six minutes and that the effort required rendered the operator "incapable of further exertion".

Furthermore, as the operation of the device depended upon air pressure inside the caissons (whether the means of moving them was by varying this air pressure or otherwise), when contractor Henry Maudslay delivered them and they were found to leak air, the scheme failed. In 1818, after many unsuccessful repair attempts, the company substituted conventional locks.

A patent granted to Jonathan Brownill, a cutler from Sheffield, on 1 May 1828, while in principle operating as an open-air balance lock, was described as using three caissons. The main caisson was connected by ropes passing over grooved pulleys to two smaller, counterbalancing caissons. Brownill's innovation was to place wedges ("inclined planes") opposite the upper and lower fixed openings, so that as the main caisson moved into place, powered by water being added or released from the counterbalancing caissons, rollers acting against the wedges forced it against a padded frame surrounding the opening. The "conductor" was to have control of a lever to release the rollers when the vertical gates were slid shut for the next ascent or descent.

== See also ==
- Balance lock
- Canal inclined plane
- Boat lift
- Diagonal lock
