= Jackdaws Music Education Trust =

- Great Elm; Frome; BA11 3NY; United Kingdom

Information
- Type: Charitable Trust
- Founded: 12 June 1993
- Founder: Maureen Lehane Wishart
- Charity Number: 1037073
- Artistic Director: Saffron van Zwanenberg
- Values: Inspiration, Access, Inclusion
- Mission: To enable creative expression by bringing music to life
- Website: http://www.jackdaws.org.uk

Jackdaws Music Education Trust is a charitable organisation specialising in Classical music education. Focussing on children and adult amateur musicians, it runs year round weekend courses, an extensive series of education projects with Somerset schools and a Young Artist programme.

It was established in 1993 by Mezzo-soprano Maureen Lehane at her home in Great Elm, a village close to the Somerset town of Frome. The organisation has the aim of bringing Classical music of the highest standard to people of all ages, abilities and backgrounds.

== Founding ==
The organisation emerged from the Great Elm Music Festival, a small series of performances first run in 1987 and then presented annually by Maureen Lehane out of her home in Great Elm. Her desire was to spread education as well as enjoyment of Classical music, which required a building and led to the purchasing of the Great Elm Coach House by local philanthropist Rosemary Bugden. She then let the Coach House to Maureen on a rent of £1 per year to give her a building in which to found the music centre.

The Jackdaws Music Education Trust was formally opened by Dame Joan Sutherland on 12 June 1993, in the Coach House beside Maureen's home at Bridge House.

The organisation name Jackdaws came from the title of a song for voice and piano by Peter Wishart to words by William Cowper. As the charity was founded by his wife, and dedicatee of the song, Maureen Lehane in his memory, the title seemed appropriate.

=== Education projects ===
The Trust is a lead partner in Arts Council England's music education hub for Somerset, Sound Foundation Somerset.

Jackdaws work with children in Somerset schools each year through their large-scale education projects, such as OperaPLUS, Year of... and Song Story, as well as smaller projects such as the School Picnic, Summer Production, and community orientated events such as the Big Sing, part of Sound Foundation Somerset's School Singing Strategy.

In 2016, the Jackdaws OperaPLUS project won a Music Teacher Magazine Award for Excellence.

=== Maureen Lehane Vocal Awards ===
Starting in 1992, the Great Elm Vocal Award was founded in memory of Peter Wishart, a composer of songs for classical voice. Launched to support aspiring young opera singers in their studies, the awards are open to singers between the ages of 22 and 30. Contestants have perform two songs by set composers Handel and Peter Wishart, and for the first time in 2015, one own choice piece.

The Awards have gone through a number of name changes. It began as the Rosemary Bugden Vocal Award in 1992, after Rosemary Bugden who provided most of the funding for the competition. In 1994 the awards returned as the Great Elm Festival Vocal Award after being coupled with the Great Elm festival; there was no award in 1993. The 1999 award, won by Andrew Kennedy, was the first to include Jackdaws, the charitable organisation founded by Maureen, in the title after administration for the awards was handed to the Trust which continues to run the awards today. The name remained variously the Jackdaws Great Elm Vocal Award, Great Elm Vocal Award and Jackdaws Vocal Awards until 2011 when, following the death of Maureen Lehane in December 2010, the competition was renamed the Maureen Lehane Vocal Awards and her life commemorated with a celebration concert in the evening.

The Award has supported many accomplished singers of Opera including Amanda Echalaz, Dawid Kimberg, Madeleine Pierard, Anna Devin, Christopher Maltman and Andrew Kennedy. In 2015, the award was won by the first reserve finalist, Baritone Julien van Mellaerts, who stepped in less than 24 hours before the final.
