= Balance lock =

Type of boat lift

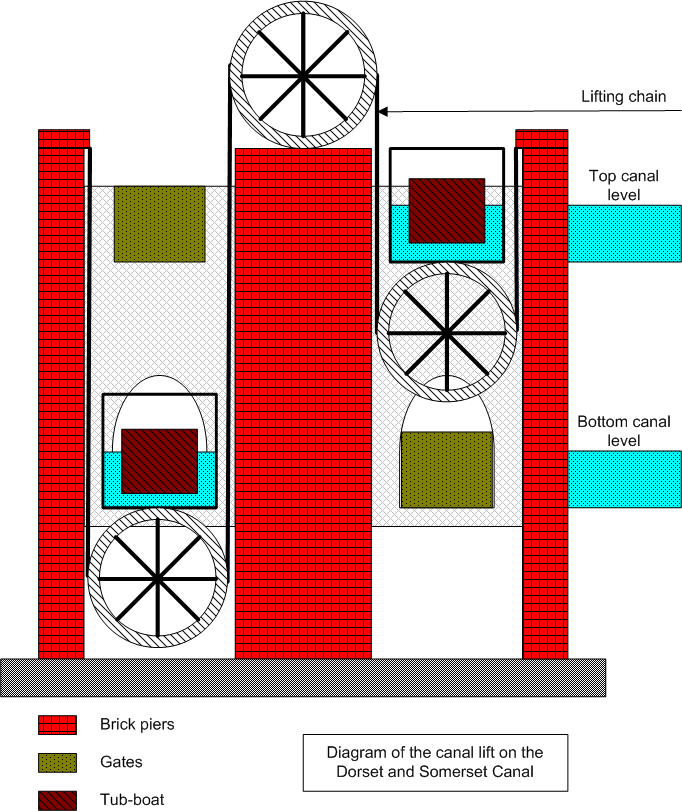
Diagram showing the arrangement of Fussell's balance lock

The balance lock was a type of boat lift designed by James Fussell (1748-1832) to transport boats up and down a hillside on a canal. An experimental balance lock was built as part of the Dorset and Somerset Canal and work was started for four more, but the project failed for financial reasons and they were not completed.

== History ==
When the Dorset and Somerset Canal was authorised by an Act of Parliament in 1796, the builders were faced with the need for many locks, as the branch to Frome needed to accommodate a change in level of 264 feet (80 m). James Fussell was a knowledgeable ironworker, and proposed the building of boat lifts to raise and lower the boats, rather than conventional locks. There had been some precursors, for John Duncombe had invented a counterbalanced lift in 1790, while working as the engineer on the Ellesmere Canal, and Robert Wheldon was proposing to use lifts on the nearby Somerset Coal Canal.

From the documents which accompanied the bill when it was submitted to parliament, it is evident that Fussell's plans were already well-formulated. However, since the design was untested, an experimental boat lift was built at the top of Barrow Hill. It would be capable of handling boats weighing 10 tons, and would raise them by 20 feet (6.1 m). In many respects, it was similar to those later built by James Green on the Grand Western Canal, which also used counterbalanced caissons. However, there were differences. One was that Fussell's design used chains which passed round wheels attached to the caisson, the end of which was fixed to the top of the structure, whereas Green fixed his chains to a bar on the caisson. Fussells design included guide rails running up the chamber, which steadied the caisson, and he used a separate chamber beneath the caisson to hold extra water, which made the top tank heavier, and thus provided the motive power to cause the lift to operate. The design of his balance lock formed the basis for a patent application, number 2284, which he obtained in 1798.

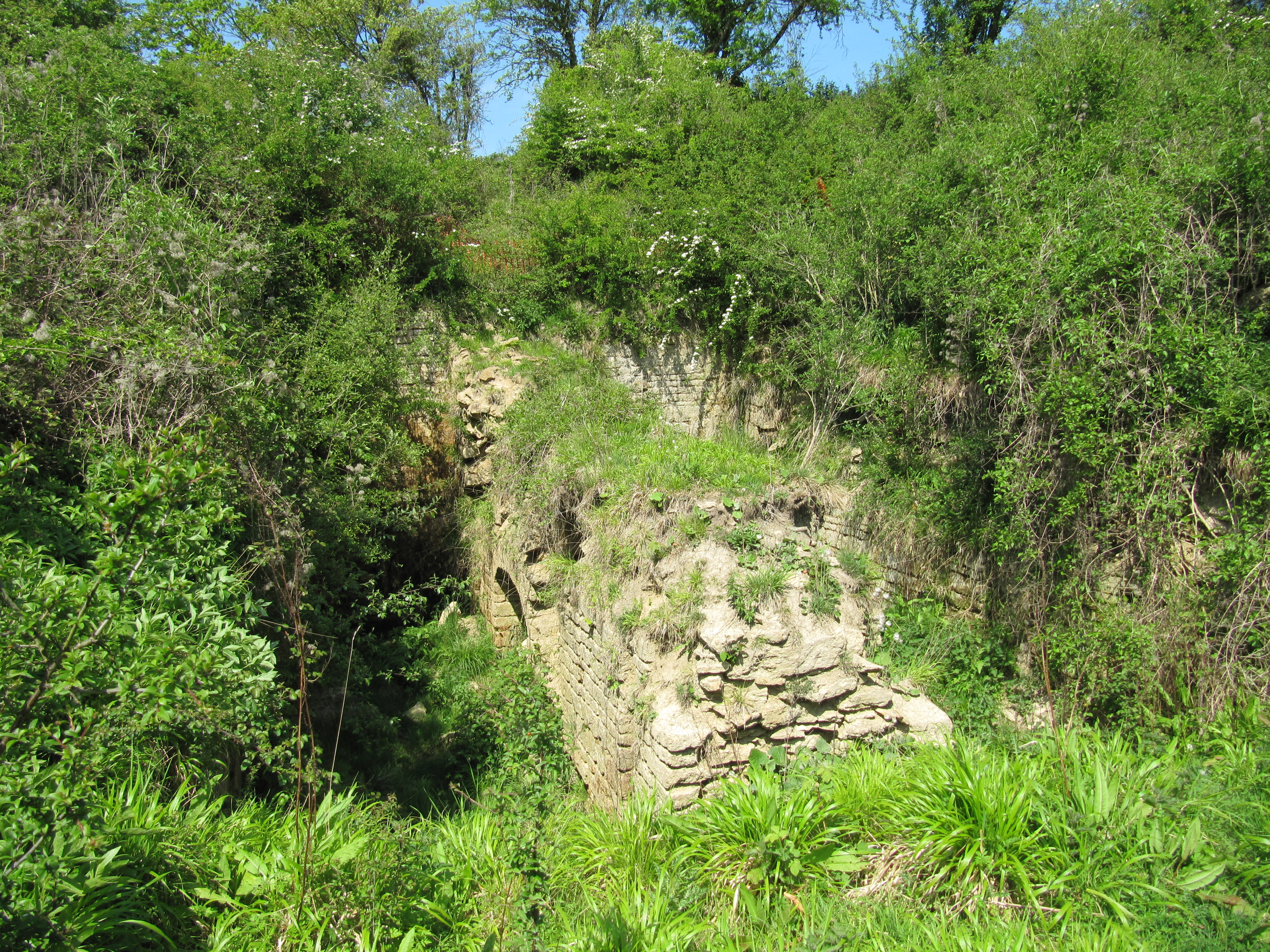
The remains of James Fussell's balance lock on the Dorset and Somerset Canal, excavated in 2005

The trial lift was completed, and a series of tests were carried out in September and October 1800. The Bath Chronicle carried a report of the test on 16 October, stating that the lift had been operated several times, without any difficulty or problems, and that engineers had inspected it carefully and declared themselves entirely satisfied. The company intended to build five more lifts on Barrow Hill, and pits for four of them were excavated. Some stone work was also begun, but the company ran out of money, and the project was abandoned following the failure to raise additional money in 1803.

== Details ==
Following excavations at the site in 2005 and 2006, the structure was estimated to be 35 feet (11 m) high and 30 feet (9.1 m) long. The total width was around 24 feet (7.3 m), which included the two pits and a central spine wall.

== See also ==
- Canals of the United Kingdom
- History of the British canal system
- Caisson lock

== Bibliography ==
- Hadfield, Charles (1967). The Canals of South West England. Daved and Charles. ISBN 0-7153-4176-6.
- Hunt, Derrick; Tuddenham, Adrian (2007). "Fussell's Trial Balance Lock - a boat lift near Mells" (PDF). Dorset and Somerset Canal website.
