= Old Iron Works, Mells =

Ruined iron works in Somerset, England

- Site of Special Scientific Interest
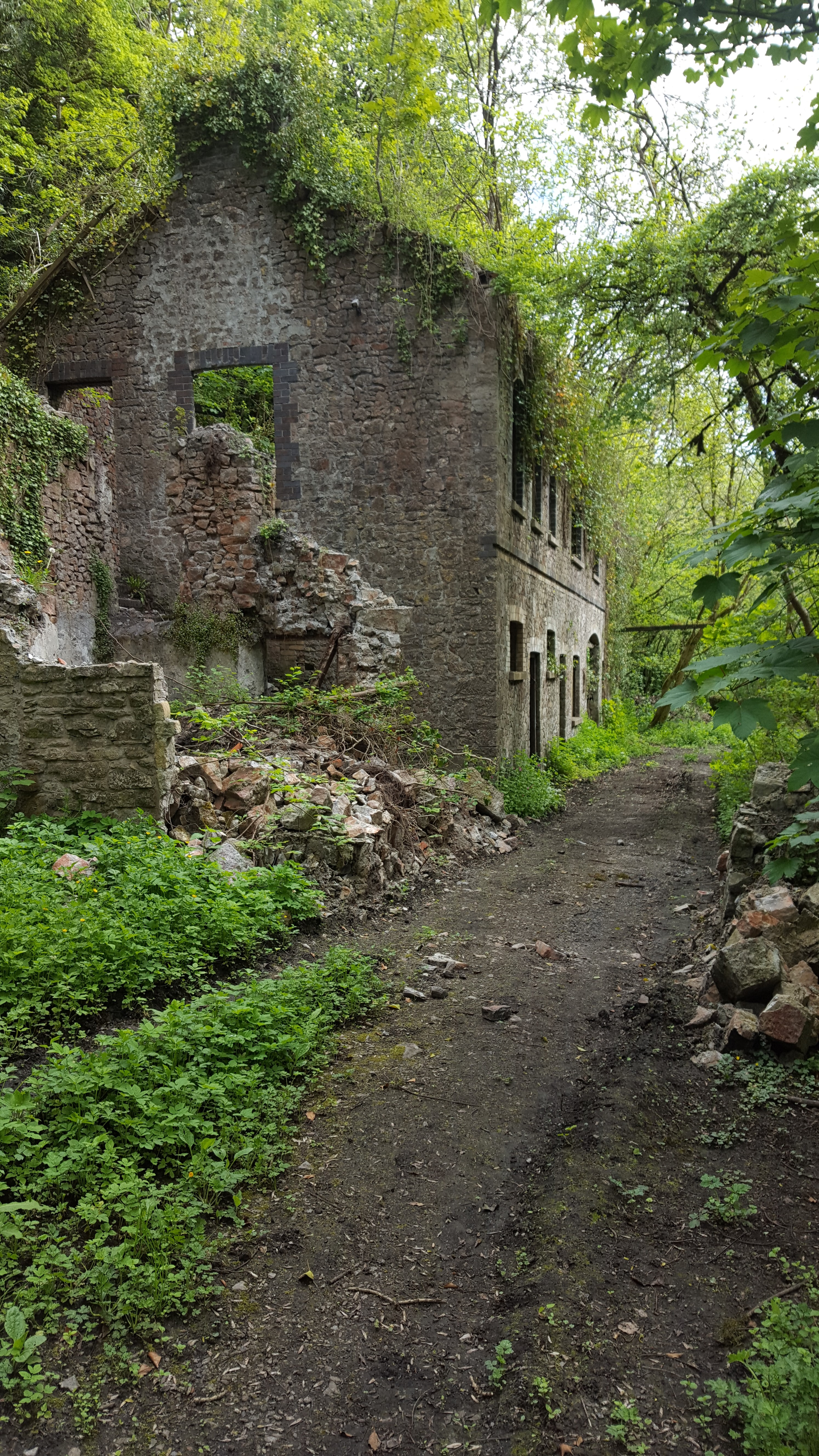

- Location within Somerset
- Location of Old Iron Works, Mells.
- Area of search: Somerset
- Grid reference: ST 738488
- Coordinates: 51.23777°N 2.37667°W
- Interest: Industrial Archaeology, Biological
- Area: 0.25 hectares (0.62 acres)
- Notification date: 1987

Old Iron Works, Mells (Fussells' Lower Works) (grid reference ST738488) is a 0.25 hectare biological Site of Special Scientific Interest, in the Wadbury Valley, south of the village of Mells in Somerset, notified in 1987. The site is a ruined iron works, which mainly produced agricultural edge-tools that were exported all over the world, and is now, in addition to its unique and major importance in relation to industrial archaeology, used as a breeding site by horseshoe bats. The block of buildings adjacent to the entrance is listed Grade II* and most of the rest of the site is a Scheduled Ancient Monument. It is included in the Heritage at Risk Register produced by English Heritage.

== Biological interest ==
The site is used by both Greater and Lesser Horseshoe Bats. The roof space of one of the former works buildings was used, before the building burnt down in the 1980s, as a breeding roost in summer by large numbers of Greater Horseshoes and smaller numbers of Lesser Horseshoes. Disused flues and tunnels in a low cliff are used for hibernation.

== History ==
It is likely that there was some form of foundry on or near the site since about 1500 when Mells seems to have been known as Iron Burgh. There are further documentary records which indicate that iron working had been undertaken locally since at least the early 13th century.

The land on which the Lower Works were built was leased by John Horner (an alleged descendant of Little Jack Horner) to James Fussell III of Stoke Lane, on 25 December 1744, to erect "a good, firme and substantiall Mill or Mills for Grinding Edge Tools and forging Iron plates". His son, James Fussell IV further developed the business. At one time it employed 250 people on this site and continued for many years, with various members of the Fussell family operating a total of six sites in the local area: the Upper Works further up the Wadbury Valley, the Great Elm Edge-Tool Works, the Chantry Works, the Railford Works and a small site at Gurney Slade. Tools produced by Fussells were exported to Europe and America, and the family expanded its activities to include coal mining and banking, with the business issuing its own banknotes at one stage.

The business declined towards the end of the 19th century, due in part to a failure to convert from water to steam power until a late stage, and also to the collapse of English agriculture in the 1870s. By 1895 production had ceased, and the company folded in 1900.

Many of the old photographs, diagrams, plans and tools are now exhibited at Frome Museum.
