= James Fussell IV =

English iron magnate (1748–1832)

James Fussell IV (1748–1832) was an iron magnate operating the Old Iron Works, Mells in Vallis Vale between Mells and Great Elm in Somerset. He was a promoter of the Dorset and Somerset Canal and the inventor of both the roller chain and the balance lock.

== Invention of the balance lock ==
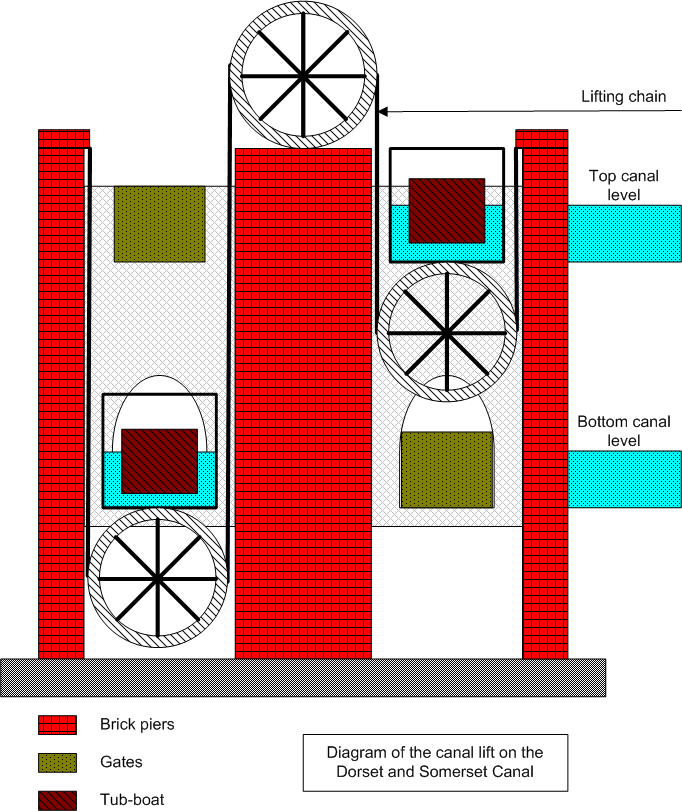
Diagram showing the arrangement of Fussell's balance lock

The balance lock was a type of boat lift designed by James Fussell IV to transport boats up and down a hillside on a canal. An experimental balance lock was built as part of the Dorset and Somerset Canal.

== Invention of roller chain ==
Sketches by Leonardo da Vinci in the 16th century show a chain with a roller bearing. In 1800, James Fussell IV patented a roller chain on development of his balance lock and in 1880 Hans Renold patented a bush roller chain.

== Business history ==
James Fussell III had leased the site in Mells in 1744, to erect "a good, firme and substantiall Mill or Mills for Grinding Edge Tools and forging Iron plates". His son, James Fussell IV further developed the business. At one time it employed 250 people and continued for many years, with various members of the Fussell family operating a total of six sites in the local area: the Upper Works further up the Wadbury Valley, the Great Elm Edge-Tool Works, the Chantry Works, the Railford Works and a small site at Gurney Slade. Tools produced by Fussells were exported to Europe and America, and the family expanded its activities to include coal mining and banking, with the business issuing its own banknotes at one stage.

The business declined towards the end of the 19th century, due in part to a failure to convert from water to steam power until a late stage, and also to the collapse of English agriculture in the 1870s. By 1895 production had ceased, and the company folded in 1900.
