= Vallis Vale =

Woodland and nature reserve in Somerset, UK

- Site of Special Scientific Interest
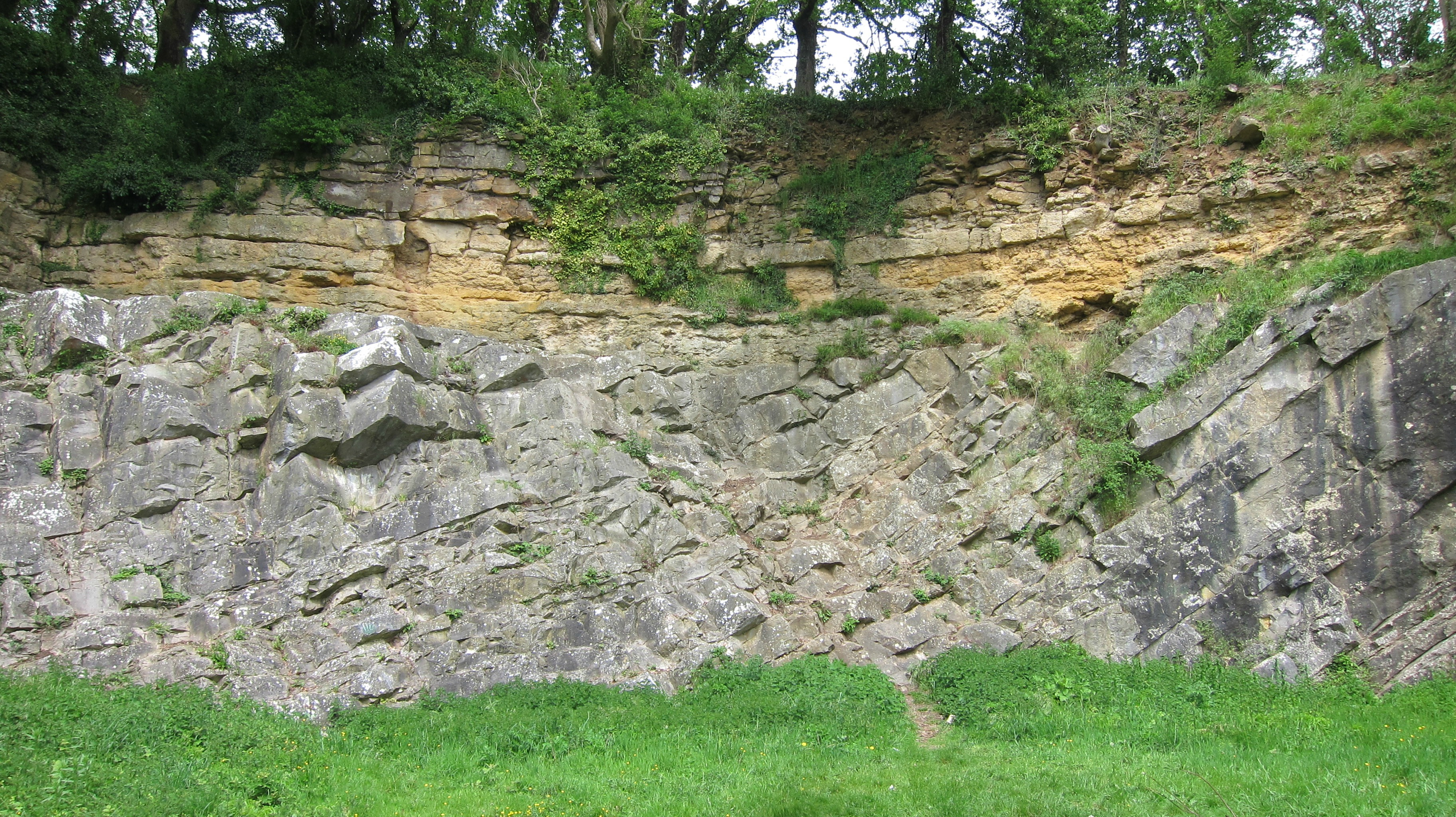
- The De la Beche angular unconformity at Vallis Vale

- Location within Somerset
- Location of Vallis Vale.
- Area of search: Somerset
- Grid reference: ST755490
- Coordinates: 51.23965°N 2.35234°W
- Interest: Biological and Geological
- Area: 23.9 hectares (0.239 km^{2}; 0.092 sq mi)
- Notification date: 1952

Vallis Vale (grid reference ST755490) is a 23.9 hectare biological and geological Site of Special Scientific Interest near Great Elm in Somerset, notified in 1952.

Vallis Vale is an ancient woodland site and supports an Ash-Wych Elm stand type with a restricted distribution in Britain.

Vallis Vale exposes some of Britain's most classic rock outcrops, exhibiting several of the most easily demonstrated examples of angular unconformity available. A nationally important research and educational locality, of great renown for the part it has played in the historical development of geological science.

== Sources ==
- English Nature citation sheet for the site (accessed 10 August 2006)
