= Great Elm =

Village in Somerset, England

Coordinates: 51°14′29″N 2°21′48″W

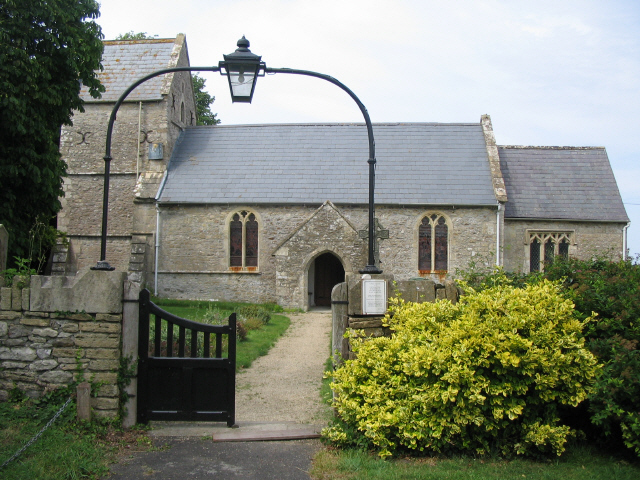
- Church of St Mary Magdalene, Great Elm

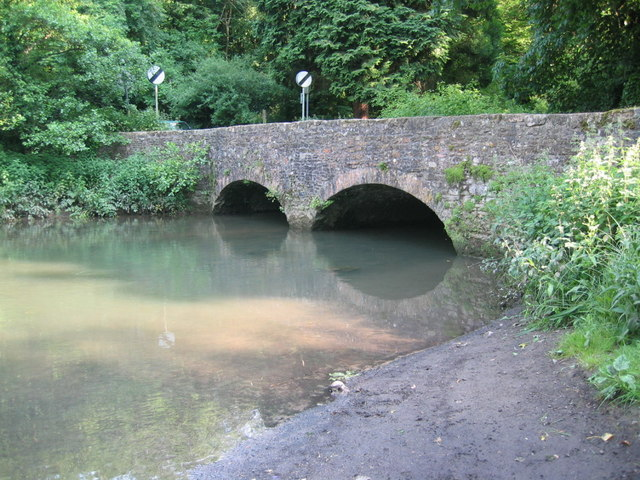
- Bridge over Mells River

- Location within Somerset
- Population: 171 (2011)
- OS grid reference: ST745495
- Unitary authority: Somerset
- Ceremonial county: Somerset
- Region: South West
- Country: England
- Sovereign state: United Kingdom
- Post town: FROME
- Postcode district: BA11
- Dialling code: 01373
- Police: Avon and Somerset
- Fire: Devon and Somerset
- Ambulance: South Western
- UK Parliament: Frome and East Somerset

Great Elm is a village and civil parish between Mells and Frome in Somerset, England. The parish includes the hamlet of Hapsford. In 2011 the parish had a population of 171.

== History ==
The name Great Elm was recorded as Telma in the Domesday Book of 1086, and then as Teames in 1236 which is a contraction of aet elm at the elm tree. Little Elm developed into the village of Chantry.

At Tedbury Camp southwest of the village a pot of Roman coins was dug up in 1961.

After the Norman Conquest the manor was held by the Giffards and later by the Hidges family and then the Stracheys.

The parish was part of the hundred of Frome.

For many years in the 18th and 19th centuries Great Elm was the site of water powered mills owned by James Fussell IV.

The Stracheys owned Rock House for a period early in the 20th century.

Hapsford House on Hapsford Hill is a 19th-century country house.

The Jackdaws Music Education Trust has been based in the village since 1993.

== Governance ==
The parish council has responsibility for local issues, including setting an annual precept (local rate) to cover the council's operating costs and producing annual accounts for public scrutiny. The parish council evaluates local planning applications and works with the local police, district council officers, and neighbourhood watch groups on matters of crime, security, and traffic. The parish council's role also includes initiating projects for the maintenance and repair of parish facilities, as well as consulting with the district council on the maintenance, repair, and improvement of highways, drainage, footpaths, public transport, and street cleaning. Conservation matters (including trees and listed buildings) and environmental issues are also the responsibility of the council.

Until 2023 it was in the Non-metropolitan district of Mendip, which was formed on 1 April 1974 under the Local Government Act 1972, having previously been part of Frome Rural District.

Somerset Council is responsible for running the largest and most expensive local services such as education, social services, libraries, main roads, public transport, policing and fire services, trading standards, waste disposal and strategic planning.

It is also part of the Frome and East Somerset county constituency represented in the House of Commons of the Parliament of the United Kingdom. It elects one Member of Parliament (MP) by the first past the post system of election.

== Geography ==
The village lies above the Mells River in the Mendip Hills.

Vallis Vale is a biological and geological Site of Special Scientific Interest which includes an ancient woodland and exposes some of Britain's most classic rock outcrops, exhibiting several of the most easily demonstrated examples of angular unconformity available.

== Transport ==
The Macmillan Way long-distance path passes through the village, the Mendip Way passes by on the far side of the river, and the village is just off the Colliers Way, National Cycle Route 24.

The parish is crossed by a Mendip Rail railway line which carries aggregate trains from Whatley Quarry. On 6 October 2008 a freight train was hit from behind by a runaway train near Great Elm on the private line from Whatley Quarry. There were no serious injuries.

== Religious sites ==
The Church of St Mary Magdalene dates from the 12th century and is a Grade I listed building.
