= Mells, Somerset =

Village in Somerset, England

Coordinates: 51°14′23″N 2°23′17″W

Mells
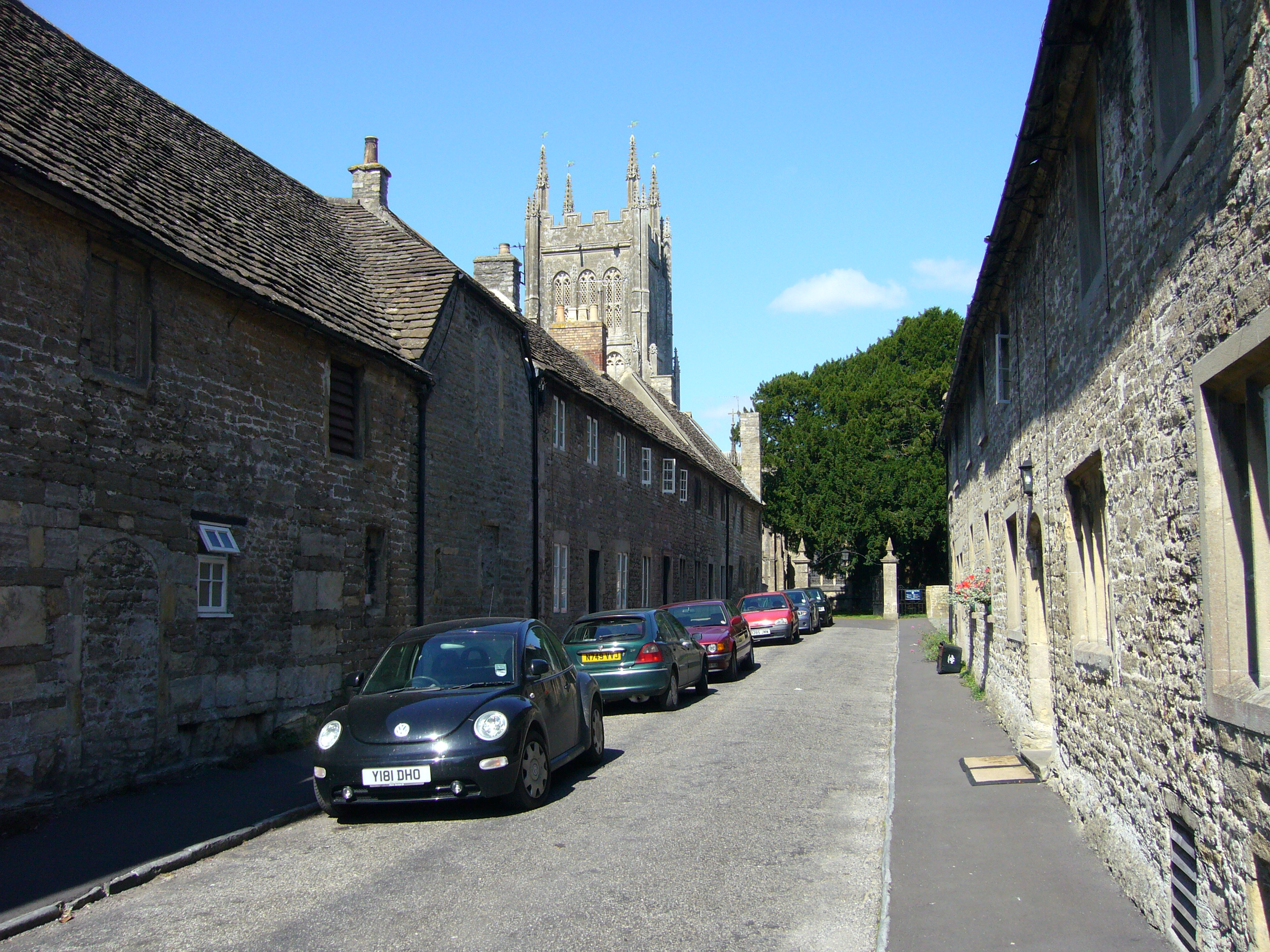
- New Street, leading towards St Andrew's Church

- Location within Somerset
- Population: 638 (2011)
- OS grid reference: ST729489
- Civil parish: Mells
- Unitary authority: Somerset Council
- Ceremonial county: Somerset
- Region: South West
- Country: England
- Sovereign state: United Kingdom
- Post town: FROME
- Postcode district: BA11
- Dialling code: 01373
- Police: Avon and Somerset
- Fire: Devon and Somerset
- Ambulance: South Western
- UK Parliament: Frome and East Somerset

Mells is a village and civil parish in Somerset, England, near the town of Frome.

== History and description ==
In the Domesday Book of 1086 the village was known as "Mulne" meaning several mills. The parish was part of the hundred of Frome.

Around 1500 Mells seems to have been known as Iron Burgh, as a result of the iron ore extracted in the area.

The village hall was built in the 14th century as a tithe barn for Glastonbury Abbey and now serves as the village hall.

During the 19th and early 20th centuries Mells and surrounding villages had several coal mines on the Somerset coalfield, much of which may have supplied the iron works of James Fussell. The Old Ironstone Works is a biological Site of Special Scientific Interest due to the population of Greater and Lesser Horseshoe bats. The site is a ruined iron works, which mainly produced agricultural edge-tools which were exported all over the world, and is now, in addition to its unique and major importance in relation to industrial archaeology. The block of buildings adjacent to the entrance is listed Grade II* and most of the rest of the site is a Scheduled Ancient Monument. It is included in the Heritage at Risk Register produced by English Heritage.

Mells War Memorial is a grade II* listed building. It was designed by Sir Edwin Lutyens and is one of several structures in the village by the same architect. The memorial was unveiled in 1921 by Brigadier-General Arthur Asquith, whose brother—killed in action in the First World War—is listed on the memorial. The Asquith family have a long association with the village.

The nearby former railway is now the route of NCR 24, the Colliers Way. Mells Road railway station opened in 1875 and closed in 1959.

Close to the church is the Grade I listed 16th-century Manor House, formerly in the Horner family and now the residence of Raymond Asquith, 3rd Earl of Oxford and Asquith. The other large house, Park House, within Mells Park, was largely rebuilt by Lutyens in 1923 following the destruction of the original 18th century Park House by fire in 1917; Pevsner calls attention to its ashlar masonry, Doric pilasters, and hipped roof. The Talbot Inn, a former coaching inn, dates from the 15th century and is Grade II* listed. It was voted Sunday Times Hotel of the Year in 2013.

The stone village lock-up was built in the 17th century.

The Mells Post Office and Shop was refurbished and reopened in 2009 as a community social enterprise, following the retirement of the postmaster the previous year. The attached Mells Café was opened in 2011 by The Great British Bake Off star Mary Berry.

The Walled Garden, part of a former monastery, is now a cafe, shop and plant nursery.

Mells Church of England First School, on the edge of the village green, was established in the mid-nineteenth century. It serves Mells and nearby villages and had 71 children on the roll in 2016. Mells Nursery School provides full day care for children from two years old to school age in a dedicated building which has been constructed adjacent to the school.

Mells held on Easter Mondays a popular and traditional event called Mells Daffodil Festival for 42 years until 2021. In 2024 this was replaced by a smaller village event, the Mells Fete.

Mells Manor was purportedly procured by Jack Horner upon discovering the deed in a pie given to him to carry to London by Richard Whiting, the last Abbot of Glastonbury. This act is referenced in the popular nursery rhyme "Little Jack Horner". An alternative explanation is that the manor was bought in 1543. After successive generations Thomas Strangways Horner moved out of the manor house in the village and commissioned Nathaniel Ireson to build the original Park House within Mells Park.

== Governance ==
The parish council has responsibility for local issues, including setting an annual precept (local rate) to cover the council's operating costs and producing annual accounts for public scrutiny. The parish council evaluates local planning applications and works with the local police, district council officers, and neighbourhood watch groups on matters of crime, security, and traffic. The parish council's role also includes initiating projects for the maintenance and repair of parish facilities, as well as consulting with the district council on the maintenance, repair, and improvement of highways, drainage, footpaths, public transport, and street cleaning. Conservation matters (including trees and listed buildings) and environmental issues are also the responsibility of the council.

For local government purposes, since 1 April 2023, the parish comes under the unitary authority of Somerset Council. Prior to this, it was part of the non-metropolitan district of Mendip (established under the Local Government Act 1972). It was part of Frome Rural District before 1974.

The village is part of the 'Ammerdown' electoral ward. The ward stretches north to Hemington also visiting Kilmersdon. The ward has a total population at the 2011 census of 2,371.

It is also part of the Frome and East Somerset county constituency represented in the House of Commons of the Parliament of the United Kingdom. It elects one Member of Parliament (MP) by the first past the post system of election.

== Religious sites ==
The village's most notable feature is St Andrew's Church, a Grade I listed building praised by Pevsner and predominantly from the late 15th century. The tower, which reaches 104 feet (32 m), dates from the mid 16th century. The centre of the chapel is dominated by an equestrian statue of Edward Horner (who fell at the Battle of Cambrai in 1917) by Sir Alfred Munnings. A number of benches are Jacobean. There is a large piece of embroidery in the pre-Raphaelite manner, made by the Mrs Horner who was a friend of Burne-Jones.

There is also a memorial, designed by Edwin Lutyens, to Raymond Asquith, who died in France in 1916. The churchyard is the last resting place of the poet Siegfried Sassoon and the Roman Catholic priest and writer Ronald Knox.

There is a small Roman Catholic chapel in the grounds of the Manor House.

== Tourism ==
Mells was rated as among the "20 most beautiful villages in the UK and Ireland" by Condé Nast Traveler in 2020. The publication recommends that visitors "marvel at the 15th-century New Street".

== Vobster ==
The parish includes the village of Vobster, which had a coal mine of the same name on the Somerset coalfield and a quarry, both of which are now disused. The old quarry is now used as a diving centre. The Church of St Edmund, at Vobster by Benjamin Ferrey, dates from 1846 and is a Grade II listed building. Vobster Inn Bridge, which carries the lane over the Mells River, is dated 1764, and is Grade II listed.

== Notable people ==
- Raymond Asquith, 3rd Earl of Oxford and Asquith, formerly FCO and SIS (retired); hereditary peer. Lives in Mells area.
- Sir Frank Beauchamp, owner of coalmines in the Somerset coalfield was born in Mells.
- Tim Burt, British geographer and Master of Hatfield College, Durham
- Jenson Button, Formula One racing driver, comes from Vobster.
- Camilla Cavendish, Baroness Cavendish of Little Venice
- Joan Heal, actress
- Christopher Hollis, author
- Frances Horner, hostess
- Annunziata Rees-Mogg, politician and journalist
- Siegfried Sassoon, poet

== Gallery ==
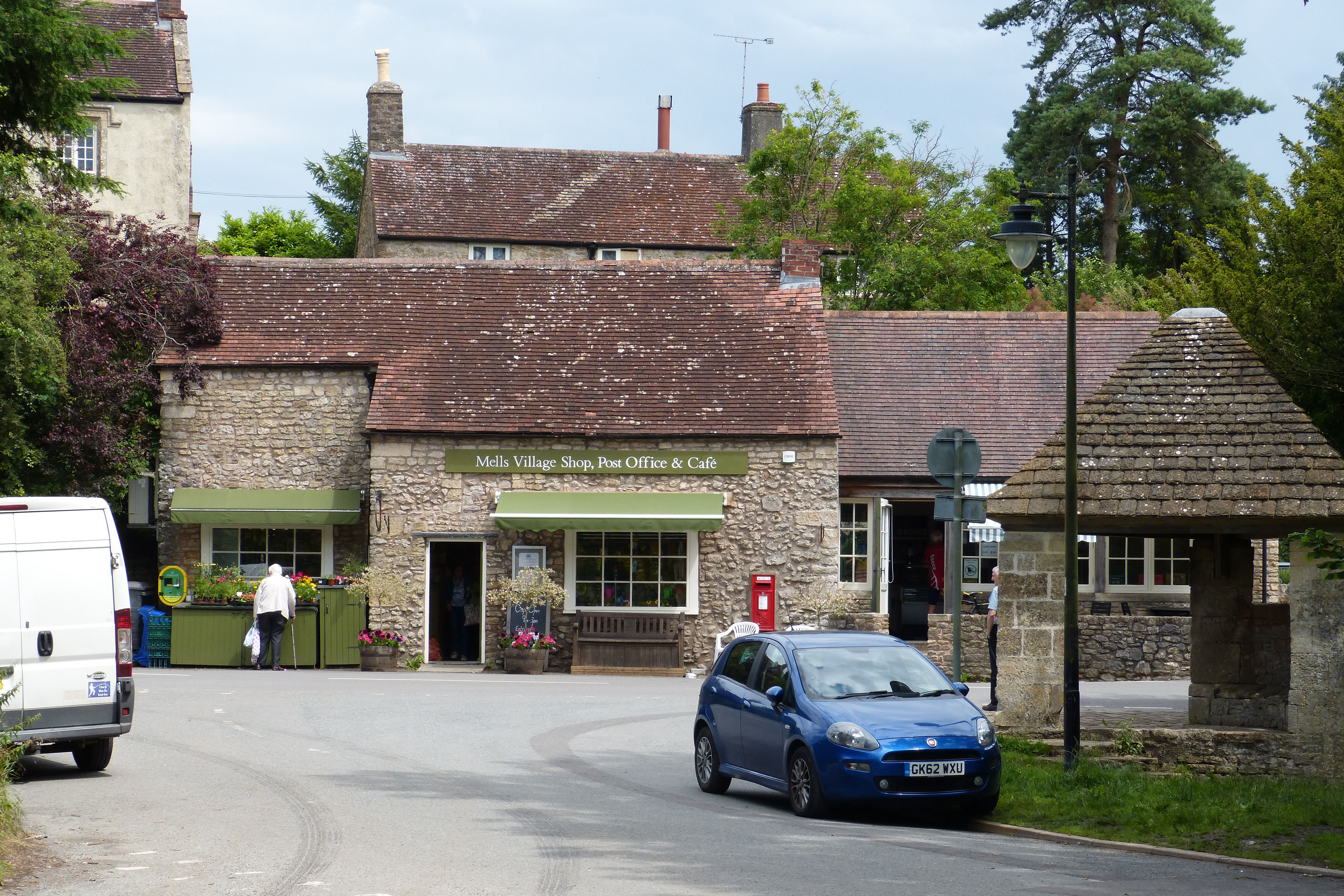
Village Shop, Post Office and Cafe

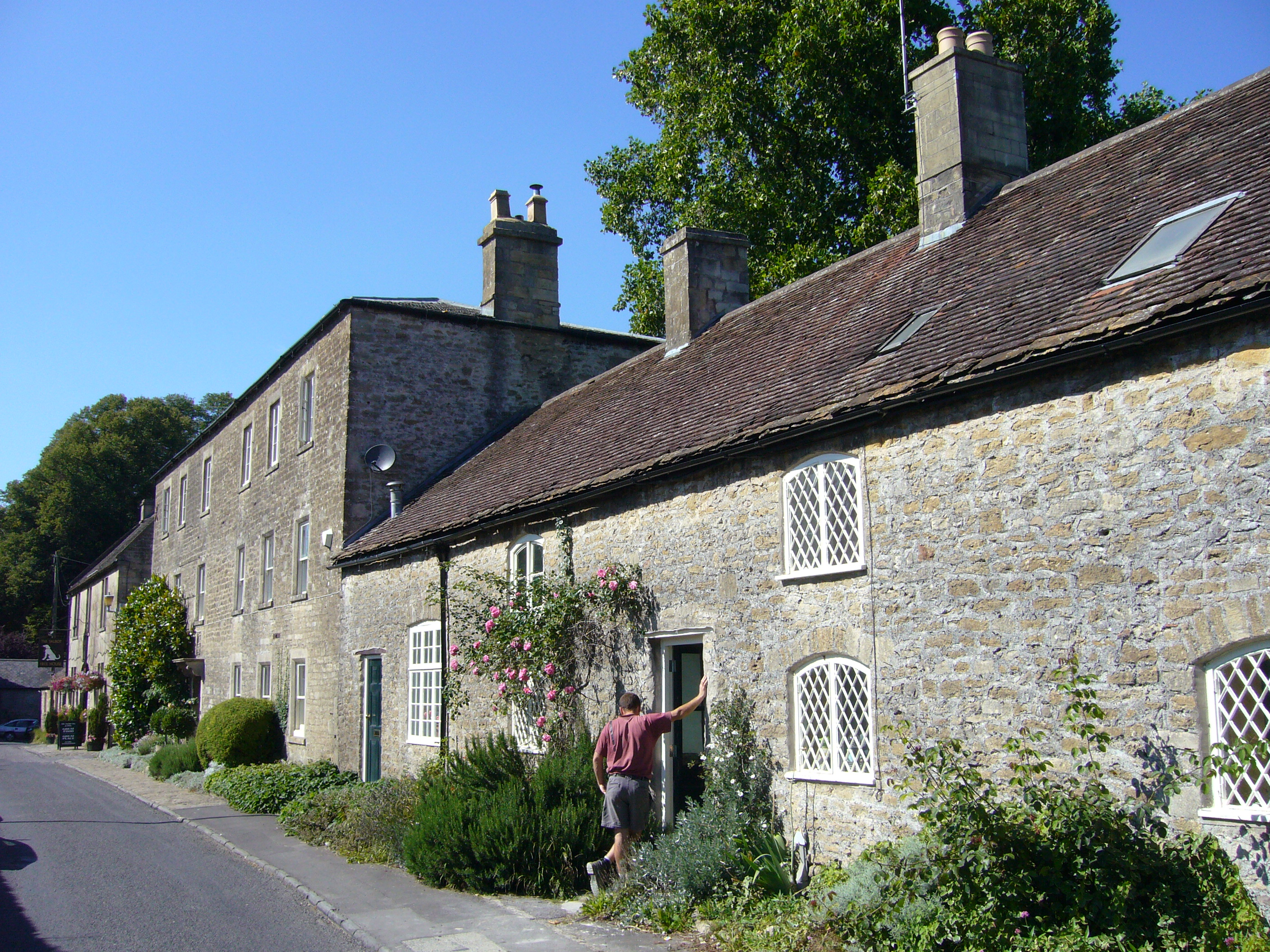
Selwood Street

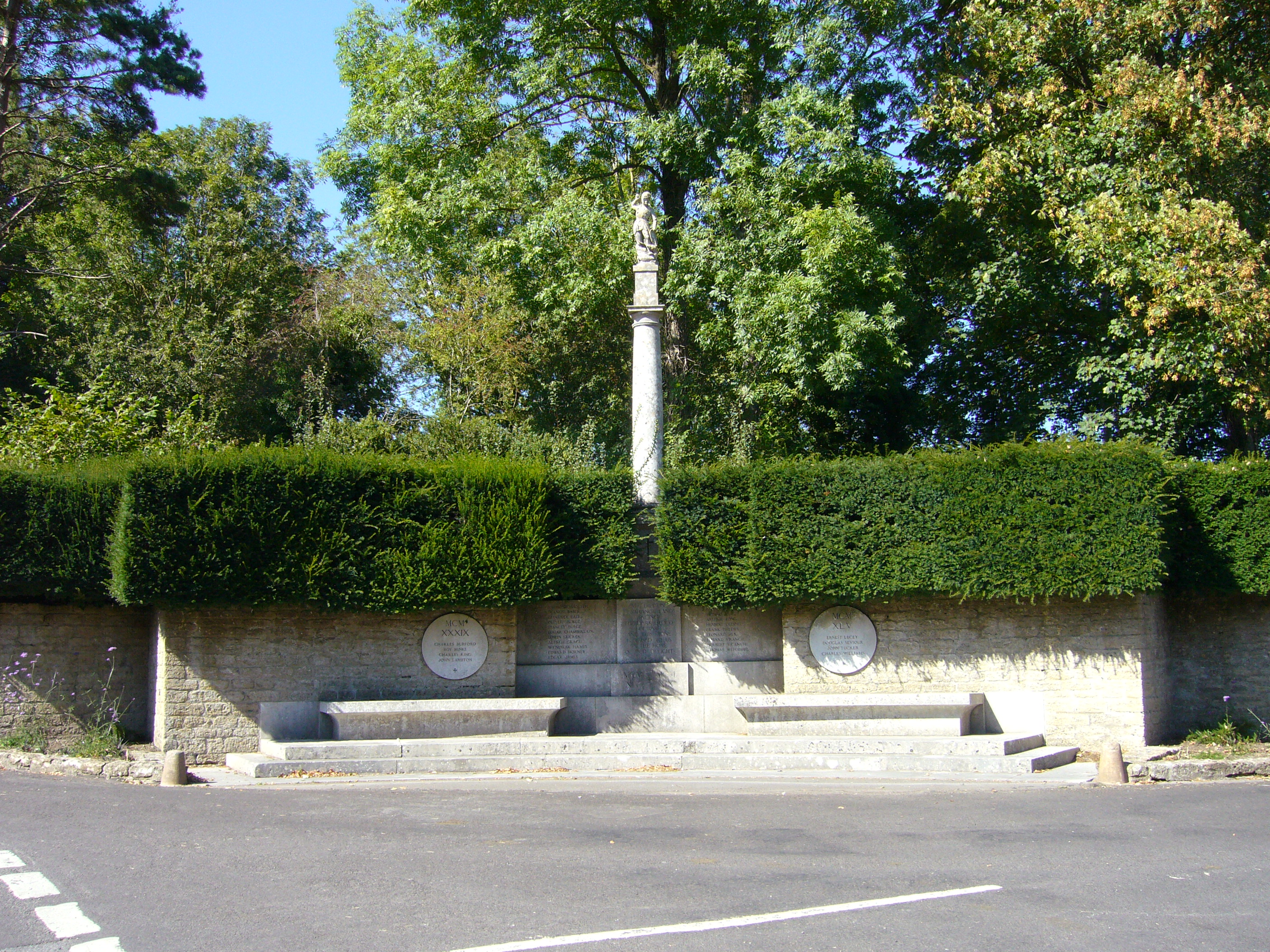
Mells War Memorial by Sir Edwin Lutyens

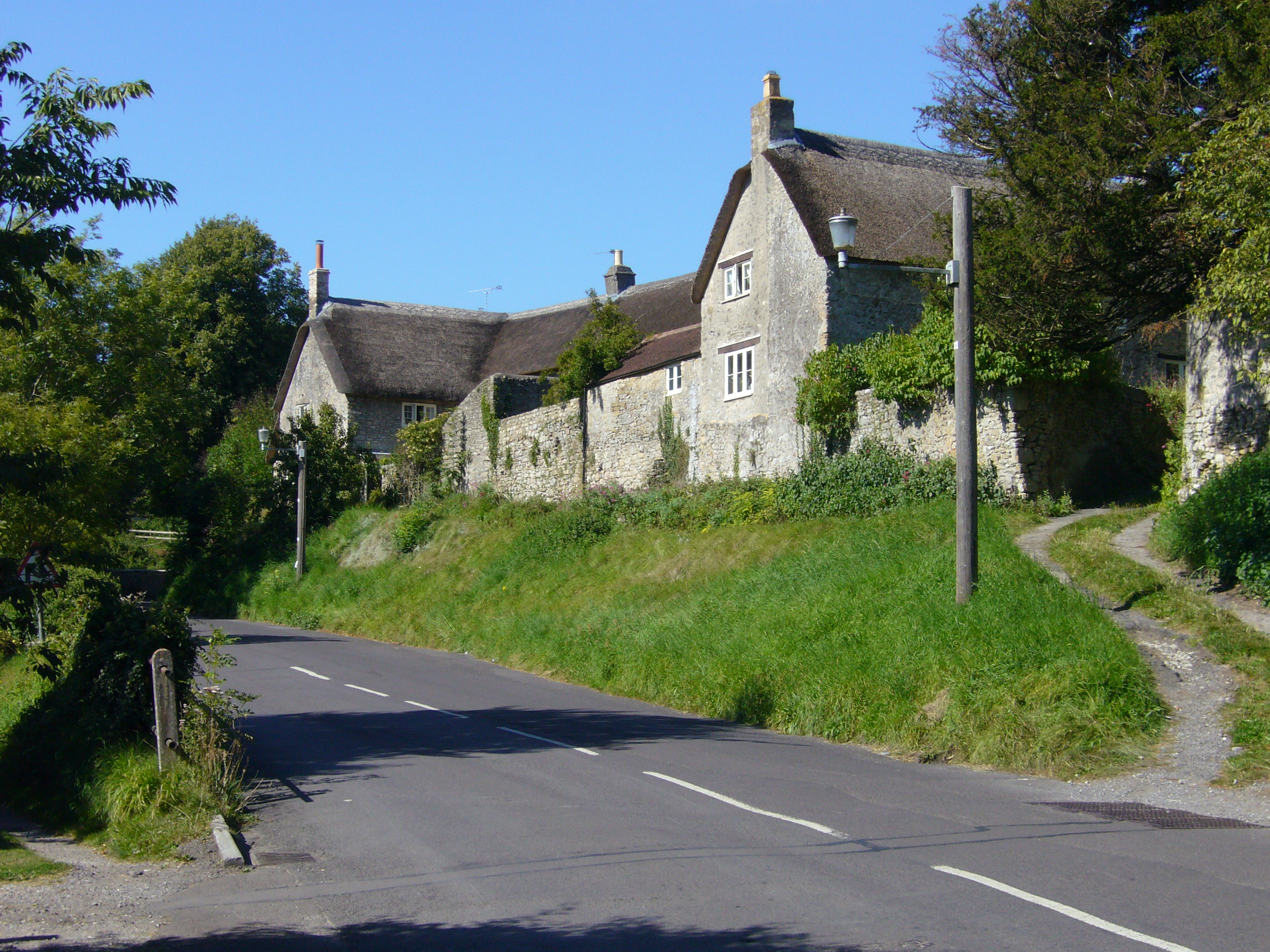
Traditional thatched cottages

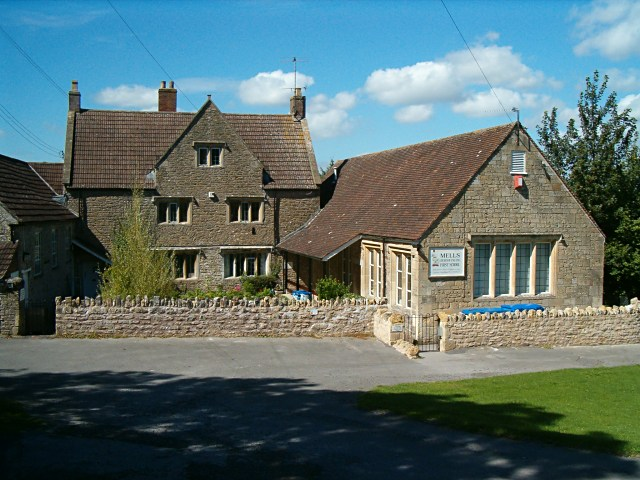
Mells Church of England First School (photo by Patrick Mackie)

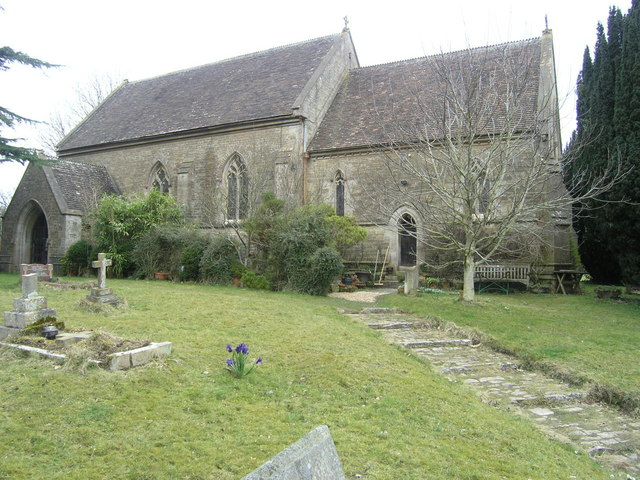
St Edmund's Church at Vobster
