= St George's Church, Beckington =

Church of St George, Beckington
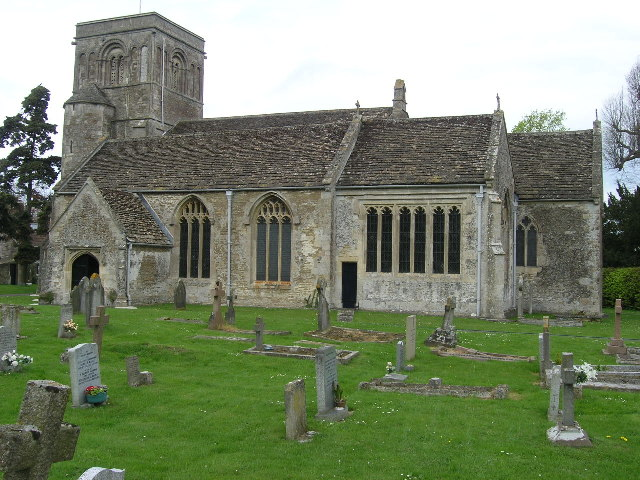

- Location within Somerset
- 51.2635°N 2.2855°W
- Location: Beckington
- Country: England
- Denomination: Church of England
- Churchmanship: Evangelical Anglicanism

History
- Status: Active

Architecture
- Functional status: Parish church
- Heritage designation: Grade I listed
- Completed: 14th century

Administration
- Diocese: Bath and Wells
- Archdeaconry: Wells
- Parish: Beckington with Standerwick

The Church of St George is a medieval Church of England parish church in Beckington, Somerset, England. It has been designated as a Grade I listed building.

== History ==
Although the first recorded rector was Matrin de Sutton, installed in 1411, the church is at least Norman in origin, with possibly a previous Saxon past. The diagonally buttressed four stage tower is broadly unaltered from the Norman period. The chancel is 14th century, in the Decorated style, while the nave is 15th century Perpendicular work.

A number of alterations have occurred over the years, such as in the early 17th century, when it gained a Jacobean screen and communion table, as well as a memorial to the poet Samuel Daniel, who died in the parish in 1619. Further notable alterations occurred in the 18th century, when the nave was reroofed (1754) and two new bells placed in the tower (1756), which were cast by Thomas Bilbie of the Bilbie family. The original six bells were recast and two extras added as part of the restoration of the tower in 1906.

The churchyard contains a number of graves, including the war grave of a Royal Artillery soldier of World War II.

=== Present day ===
The Anglican parish is part of the benefice of Beckington with Standerwick, Berkley, Lullington, Orchardleigh and Rodden within the archdeaconry of Wells.

== See also ==
- List of Grade I listed buildings in Mendip
- List of towers in Somerset
- List of ecclesiastical parishes in the Diocese of Bath and Wells
