= Lullington, Somerset =

Village and civil parish in Somerset, England

Coordinates: 51.2623°N 2.3095°W

Lullington
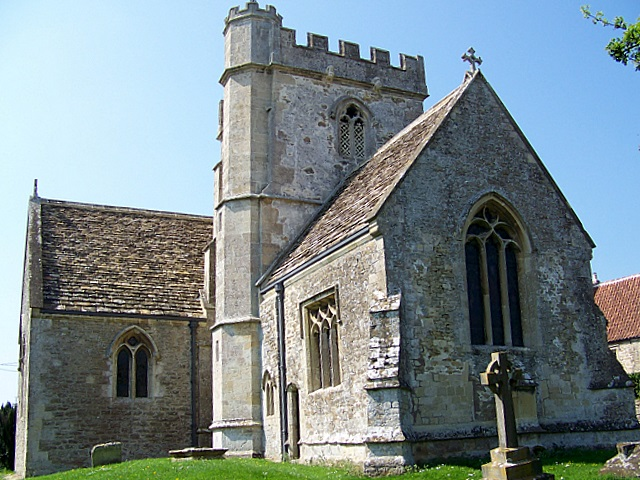
- Church of All Saints, Lullington

- Location within Somerset
- Population: 162 (2011)
- OS grid reference: ST785515
- Unitary authority: Somerset
- Ceremonial county: Somerset
- Region: South West
- Country: England
- Sovereign state: United Kingdom
- Post town: FROME
- Postcode district: BA11
- Dialling code: 01373
- Police: Avon and Somerset
- Fire: Devon and Somerset
- Ambulance: South Western
- UK Parliament: Frome and East Somerset

Lullington is a village and civil parish in the area of the Somerset Council unitary authority in England. The village lies east of Beckington, on the other side of the Mells River, and is 2.5 miles (4.0 km) north east of Frome.

The parish includes the hamlet of Laverton, where the Church of St Mary dates from the 11th century.

== History ==
The name Lullington means the settlement of Lulla's people.

Before the Norman Conquest of 1066, the estate belonged to King Harold, later passing to Longleat Priory and after the Dissolution of the Monasteries was acquired by the Thynne family. It was sold in the early 19th century by the Marquess of Bath and bought by William Duckworth, who rebuilt the village.

The parish was part of the hundred of Frome.

Just to the south of the village is the Orchardleigh Estate, which comprises a Victorian stately home, built in 1856 by Thomas Henry Wyatt for William Duckworth, a 13th-century island church, and an 18-hole golf course.

== Governance ==
The parish council has responsibility for local issues, including setting an annual precept (local rate) to cover the council's operating costs and producing annual accounts for public scrutiny. The parish council evaluates local planning applications and works with the local police, district council officers and neighbourhood watch groups on matters of crime, security and traffic. The parish council's role also includes initiating projects for the maintenance and repair of parish facilities, as well as consulting with the district council on the maintenance, repair and improvement of highways, drainage, footpaths, public transport and street cleaning. Conservation matters (including trees and listed buildings) and environmental issues are also the responsibility of the council.

For local government purposes, since 1 April 2023, the parish comes under the unitary authority of Somerset Council. Prior to this, it was part of the non-metropolitan district of Mendip (established under the Local Government Act 1972). It was part of Frome Rural District before 1974.

The parish is part of the Frome and East Somerset county constituency, represented in the House of Commons of the Parliament of the United Kingdom. It elects one Member of Parliament (MP) by the first past the post system.

== Religious sites ==
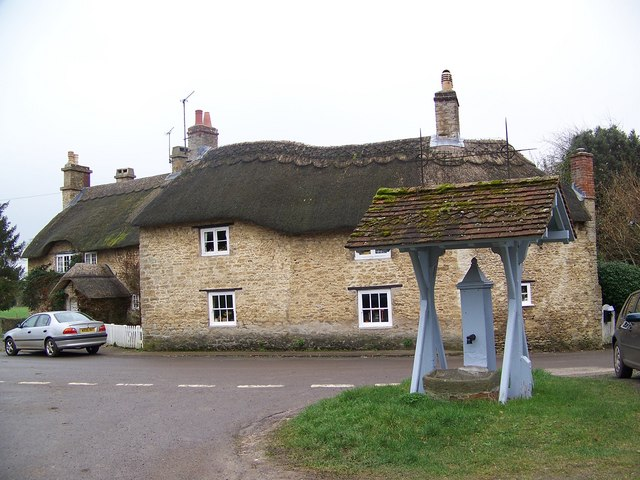
Village pump

The Church of All Saints at Lullington is the Church of England parish church. Begun in the 12th century, the south aisle is from around 1280, and the chancel, tower and south porch circa 1450. The church was restored in 1862 by T. H. Wyatt. It is a Grade I listed building. Henry Waldegrave, 11th Earl Waldegrave was the rector in the early 20th century.

St Mary's Church at Laverton has 11th-century origins but is predominantly of the 15th century; it is Grade II* listed. The 13th-century Church of St Mary, Orchardleigh stands on an island in Orchardleigh Lake and is Grade I listed.

Today, All Saints and the Orchardleigh church are part of a group of parishes alongside St George's at Beckington and three other churches. The Laverton church is part of the Hardington Vale benefice, another group of six churches, centred on Norton St Philip.
