= Horningsham =

Village in Wiltshire, England

Coordinates: 51.173°N 2.272°W

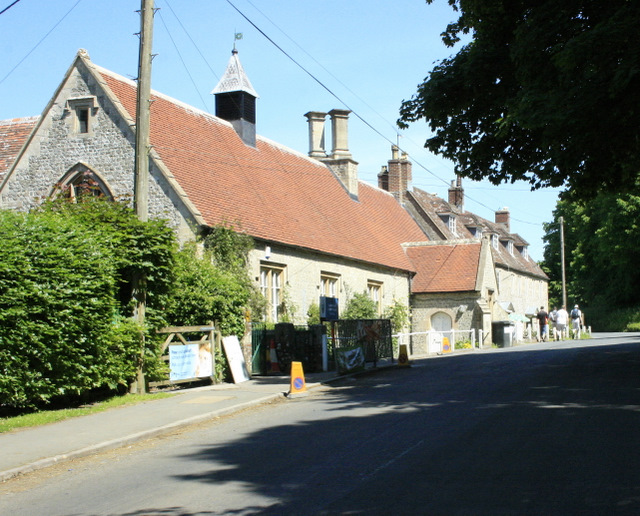
- Church Street, Horningsham, showing part of the Victorian school

- Location within Wiltshire
- Population: 327 (in 2011)
- OS grid reference: ST811416
- Unitary authority: Wiltshire
- Ceremonial county: Wiltshire
- Region: South West
- Country: England
- Sovereign state: United Kingdom
- Post town: Warminster
- Postcode district: BA12
- Dialling code: 01985
- Police: Wiltshire
- Fire: Dorset and Wiltshire
- Ambulance: South Western
- UK Parliament: South West Wiltshire
- Website: Parish Council

Horningsham is a small village and civil parish in Wiltshire, England, on the county border with Somerset. The village lies about 4 miles (6 km) southwest of the town of Warminster and 4 1/2 miles (7 km) southeast of Frome, Somerset.

The parish forms part of the Longleat estate and includes the hamlets of Hitcombe Bottom and Newbury.

== History ==
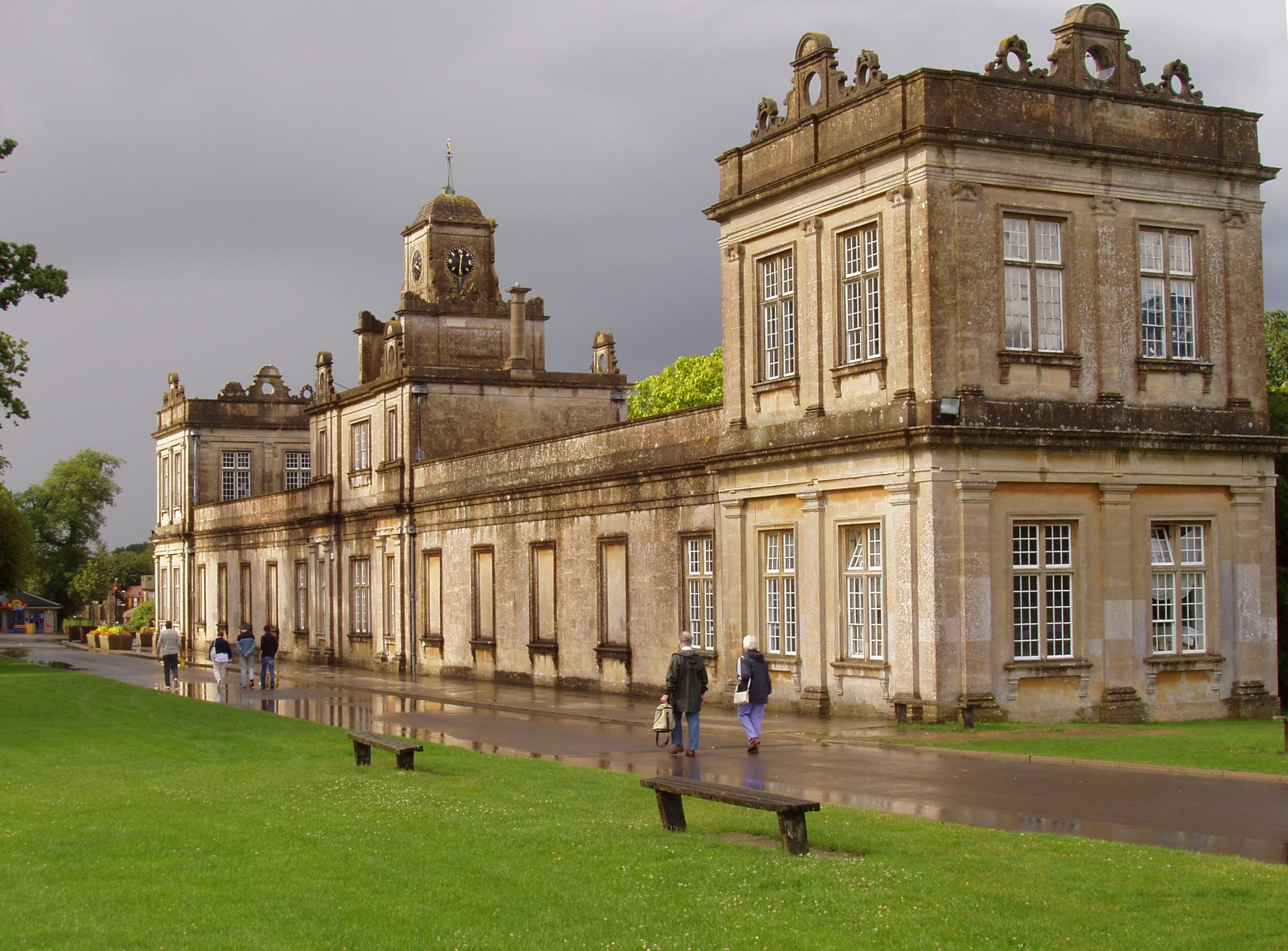
Longleat House

At Baycliffe Farm, in the south of the parish near the boundary with Maiden Bradley, are the site of an early Iron Age settlement and a Bronze Age bowl barrow. Entries in the Domesday Book of 1086 describe Horningsham as very small, being occupied by one cottager and four small holders.

The name 'Horninges-ham' means 'Horning's homestead' in Old English. The personal name probably comes from the uncomplimentary noun 'hornung' meaning 'bastard'.

A small Augustinian priory was established at Longleat at an uncertain date before 1235 and continued as a Royal peculiar controlled by the Dean of Salisbury. In 1529, Longleat Priory failed, and its land and buildings became the property of Hinton Priory, Somerset.

The Vernon family, who held the manor during the 12th century, were the founders of the village church. The Stantors then held it for some 200 years, selling to Sir John Thynne about 1550. He built Longleat House on the site of the former priory, and increased the size of the estate by buying more land. Before and after the English Civil War, the manor of Horningsham was in the possession of the Lords Arundel of Wardour Castle, and changed hands several times before the Thynnes bought it for the second time in 1716.

Close to the parish boundary on the road to Frome are the remains of Woodhouse Castle, where earthworks and fragmentary ruins, largely cellar walls, survive. In the 17th century, Woodhouse Castle was owned by the Cavalier Lords Arundel and consequently was attacked by Parliamentarians during the English Civil War. The damage was so severe that the castle was no longer habitable when peace was restored. To replace it, Henry Arundell, 3rd Baron Arundell of Wardour, built a fine manor house in Horningsham, below the church.

Thomas Thynne, 1st Marquess of Bath (1734–1796), was interested in forestry and hired Capability Brown to plant large plantations of beech and pine. Gradually forestry was established as one of the two main sources of employment, joining farming, and this did not change until the late 20th century, when tourism took over.

Longleat House, its orangery, stables and boathouse are Grade I listed, as is the archway flanked by two lodges, built c. 1804 to form an impressive approach to the house from Horningsham village.

Lord Bath's School was built to the west of the church in 1844 by Harriet, widow of Henry Thynne, 3rd Marquess of Bath. Forty children attended in 1858, and in 1892 the school was enlarged to cater for 200. The school came under the control of Wiltshire County Council in 1926 and ceased taking pupils over 11 in 1931. The building continues in use as Horningsham Primary School.

Nikolaus Pevsner described Horningsham in 1963 as "a singularly loose village with houses in their own gardens, small or large, and no visual cohesion."

== Religious sites ==
Horningsham has two places of worship, both of long standing and both Grade II* listed.

=== Church of England ===
The Church of England parish church of St John the Baptist was founded in the 12th century. The tower is from the 15th century while the body of the church was rebuilt in 1844 at the expense of the Marchioness of Bath, by T.H. Wyatt and D. Brandon. Five of the six bells are dated 1743.

Tithes from Horningsham were given to Heytesbury in the 12th century, and later in that century when Heytesbury became a collegiate church the tithes supported the canons, with the prebendary continuing after the Reformation. A notable canon was William Bradbridge, prebendary of Horningsham from 1568 to 1576 and Bishop of Exeter from 1571. The Ecclesiastical Commissioners Act 1840 abolished the prebendary, becoming effective on the death of the last canon, the Reverend John Nelson Clerk, in 1855.

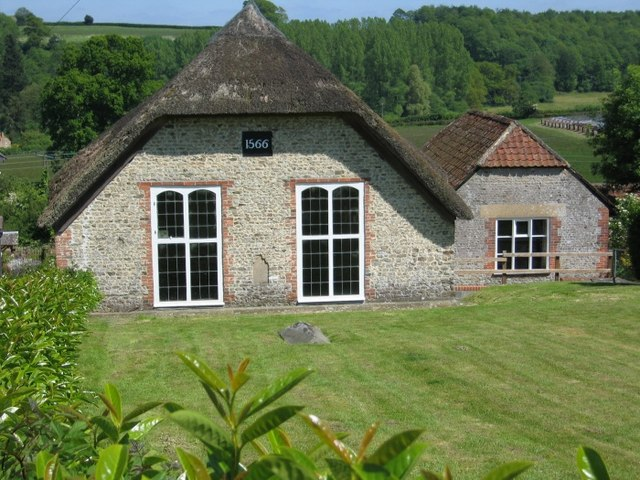
Congregational chapel in 2006

The ecclesiastical parish was united with Maiden Bradley in 1958 but the two were separated again in 1976. The parish was later expanded and renamed The Deverills and Horningsham; today it forms part of the Cley Hill benefice.

=== Congregational ===
A Congregational Chapel was built c. 1700 to the south of the village. Non-conformity came to the parish in the 16th century, when Scotsmen were employed by Sir John Thynne on the construction of Longleat House. The chapel is of rubble stone with a thatched roof, and was enlarged in 1754 and 1816. The claim that this is the oldest Free Church in England is unsubstantiated, but it is believed to be the oldest still in use for worship.

== Governance ==
Horningsham elects a parish council. Most local government services are provided by Wiltshire Council, which has its offices in nearby Trowbridge. The village is represented in Parliament by the MP for South West Wiltshire, Andrew Murrison and in Wiltshire Council by Bill Parks.

== Amenities ==
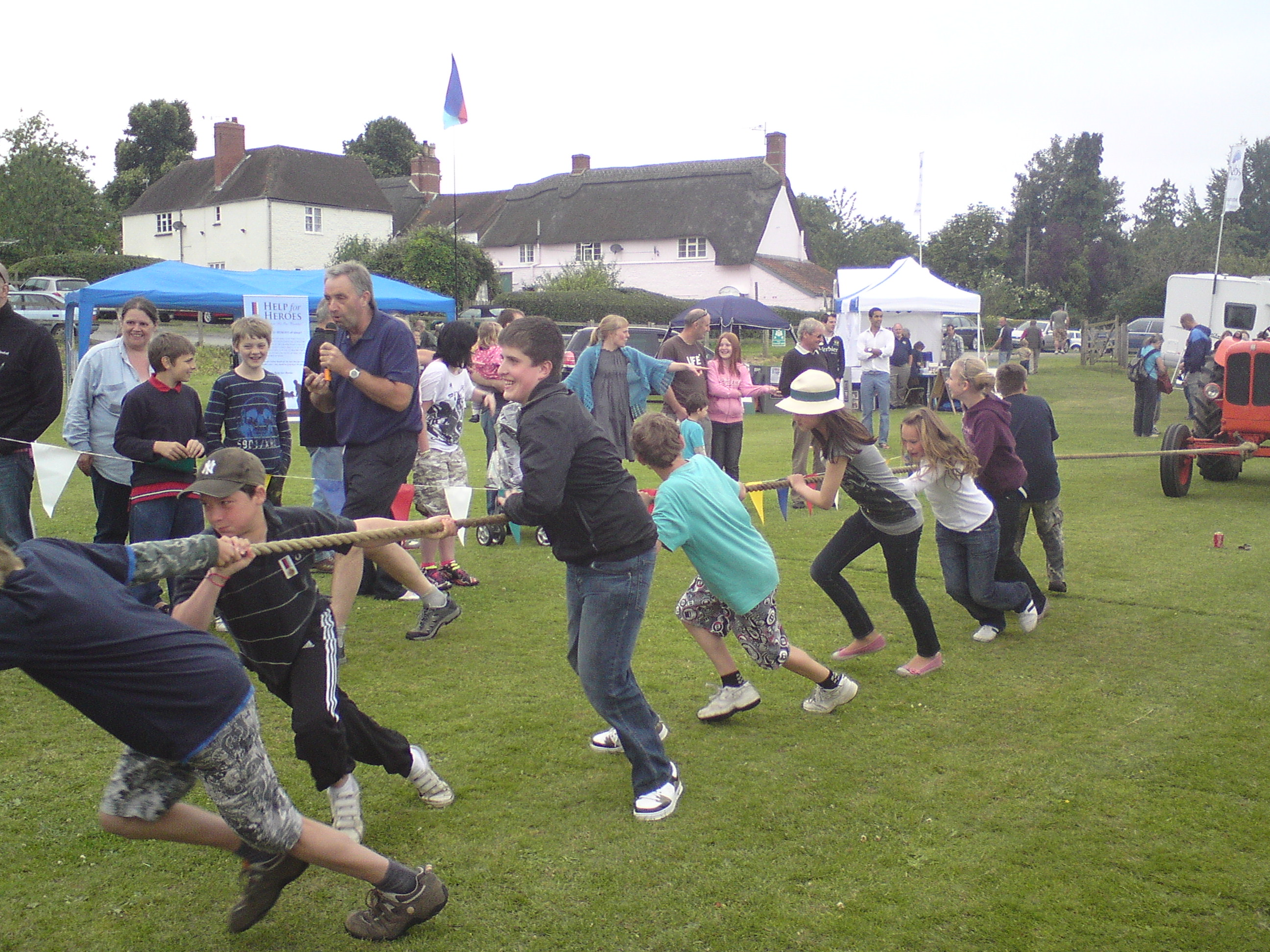
Tractor pull at 2009 Fete

The parish is within the Cranborne Chase and West Wiltshire Downs Area of Outstanding Natural Beauty.

Horningsham has the P's identified by Country Life as essential to a successful village: a pub, a post office, a place of worship, a primary school and public transport (although limited). It also has a village hall, built in 1930 at the expense of Thomas Thynne as a memorial to his wife Violet. Horningsham Cricket Club play in the Three Counties League. Every year, usually on the second Sunday in June, Lord Bath opens a well-attended village fete.

The village pub, The Bath Arms, is on The Common. Built in the 17th century, it became a public house in 1732 when it was called The New Inn. It later changed to the Lord Weymouth Arms and then the Marquess of Bath's Arms. In 1850 this was one of four pubs in the village, as well as an off-licence.

== Geology and geography ==
The village lies on middle chalk and Warminster greensand. The stream Redford Water rises in the village and eventually runs into the River Frome. The centre of the village is at 162 metres above sea level.

== In fiction ==
Horningsham is the home village of the title character in Allan Mallinson's Matthew Hervey book series.

== See also ==
- Longleat House
- Animal Park – television programme filmed at Longleat and in Horningsham
