= The George Inn, Norton St Philip =

Grade I listed pub in Somerset, England

The George Inn
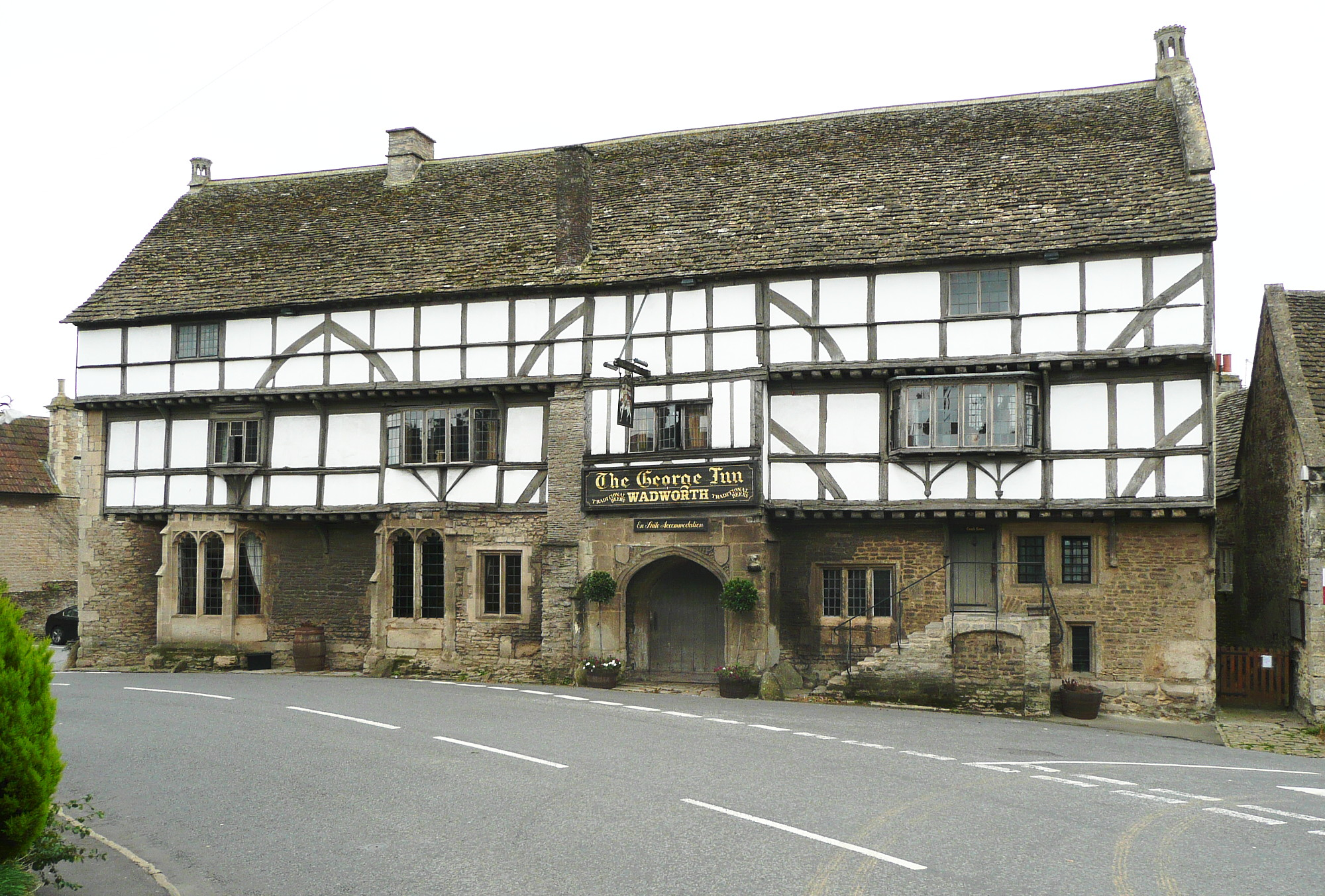

- Location within Somerset

General information
- Location: Norton St Philip, England
- Coordinates: 51°18′06″N 2°19′32″W
- Completed: 14th century
- Owner: Butcombe Brewing Company

Other information
- Parking: Yes
- Public transit: D2 bus between Bath Bus Station and Sainsbury's supermarket, Frome

Website
- butcombe.com/the-george-inn-somerset/

Listed Building – Grade I
- Designated: 11 Mar 1968
- Reference no.: 1174953

The George Inn is a historic pub and inn in Norton St Philip in Somerset, England. Built in the 14th century and extended in the 15th, it has been designated as a Grade I listed building. In 2026, an archaeologist declared it the oldest of several claimants to be England's oldest pub in continuous use.

== History ==
The George Inn was originally built as a wool store for Hinton Priory at nearby Hinton Charterhouse. Situated in the centre of the village of Norton St Philip, it accommodated travellers and merchants coming to the annual wool fairs that were held there from the late 13th century until 1902. Hinton Priory was one of the ten medieval Carthusian houses (charterhouses) in England. It was first established at Hatherop in 1222 by William Longspee, Earl of Salisbury. The monks disliked the location and on Longspee's death in 1226 they petitioned his countess for a new site to achieve greater solitude. She gave them her manors of Hinton Charterhouse and Norton St Philip and the new house was consecrated at Hinton Charterhouse in May 1232. A licence to sell alcohol at The George Inn is claimed from 1397, which may have been a local licence from the Prior of Hinton Priory as Governmental licences for alehouses were only introduced in 1552.

The timber-framed upper floors were added in the 15th century. The inn has a galleried courtyard.

In addition to the wool fairs, the inn benefited from being on the stage coach route between London and South West England. On 12 June 1668 the diarist Samuel Pepys passed through Norton St Philip with his wife and servants on the way to Bath from Salisbury.

The inn was later used as the headquarters of Monmouth's army during the Monmouth Rebellion in 1685, after his retreat from Bath. In the aftermath of the failed rebellion Judge Jeffreys used the George Inn as a courtroom and conducted 12 executions on the village common, as part of the Bloody Assizes.

The George Inn was designated a Grade I listed building on 11 March 1968. In 1998 a major programme of restoration was undertaken, funded by the Wadworth Brewery, which included extensive archaeological investigations. This showed that part of the building had been demolished in the 17th century and dendrochronology showed that the roof timbers had been replaced in or after 1431. 16th-century wall paintings were uncovered. Roof repairs included removing all 29,750 stone slates, 70% of which were reused.

In November 2020, the inn was acquired by the Butcombe Brewery, along with another pub, the Fleur-de-Lys, and The Plaine B&B, also both in the centre of Norton St Philip.

The George Inn is one of several pubs in England that have claimed to be the oldest. In 2026, an archaeologist who has worked with Historic England established by dendrochronology that it is the oldest in continuous use as a public house and was originally built in the late 14th century.

== In media ==
The building has been used as a setting for films including The Remains of the Day, Tom Jones, and The Canterbury Tales, as well as in the television adaptations of Persuasion by Jane Austen and Moll Flanders by Daniel Defoe.

== See also ==
- List of Grade I listed buildings in Mendip
- The George Inn, Southwark, another coaching inn with a galleried courtyard
