= Mostyn-Champneys baronets =

Escutcheon of the Champneys baronets of Orchardleigh

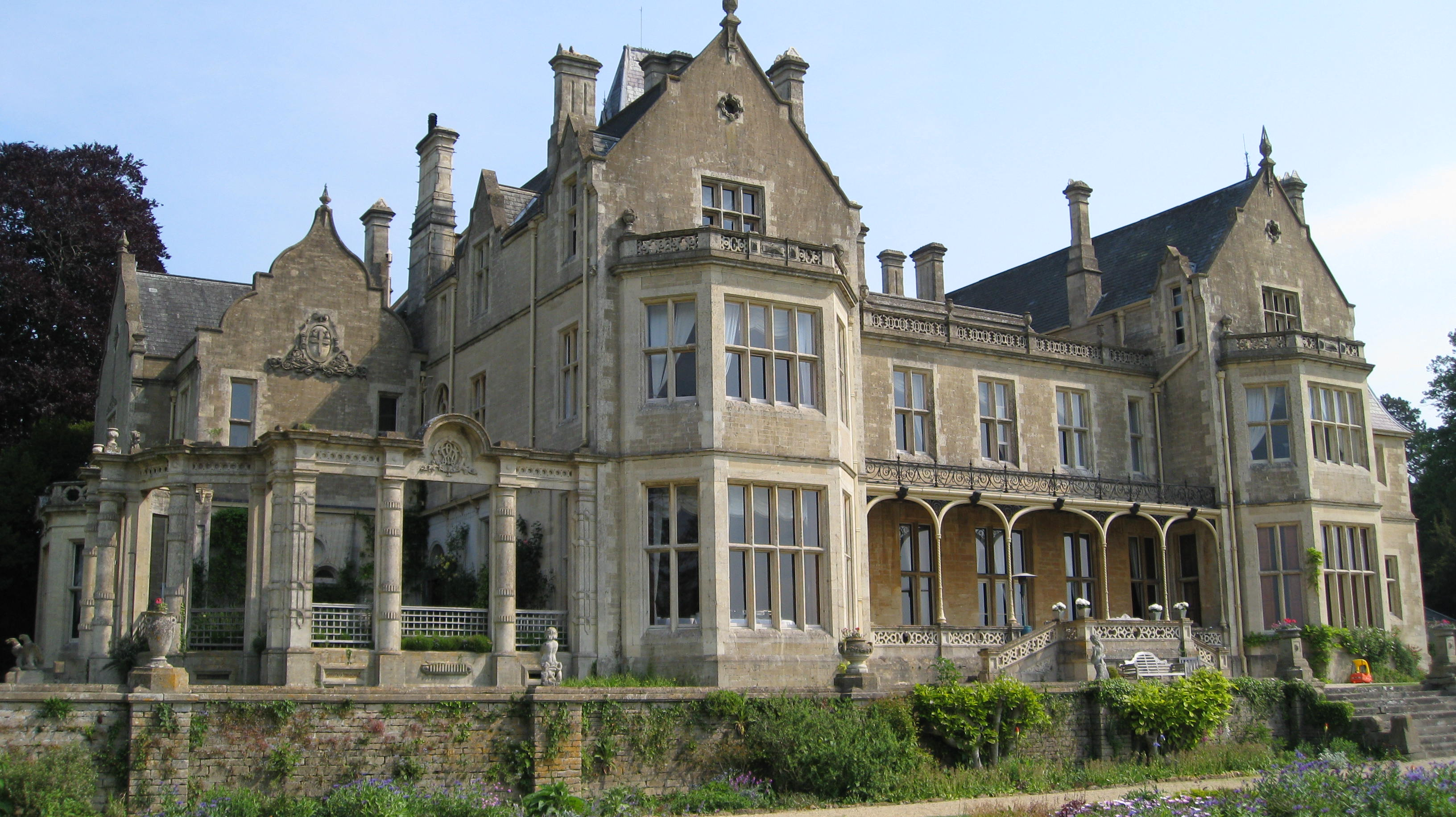
Orchardleigh House, 2008 photograph

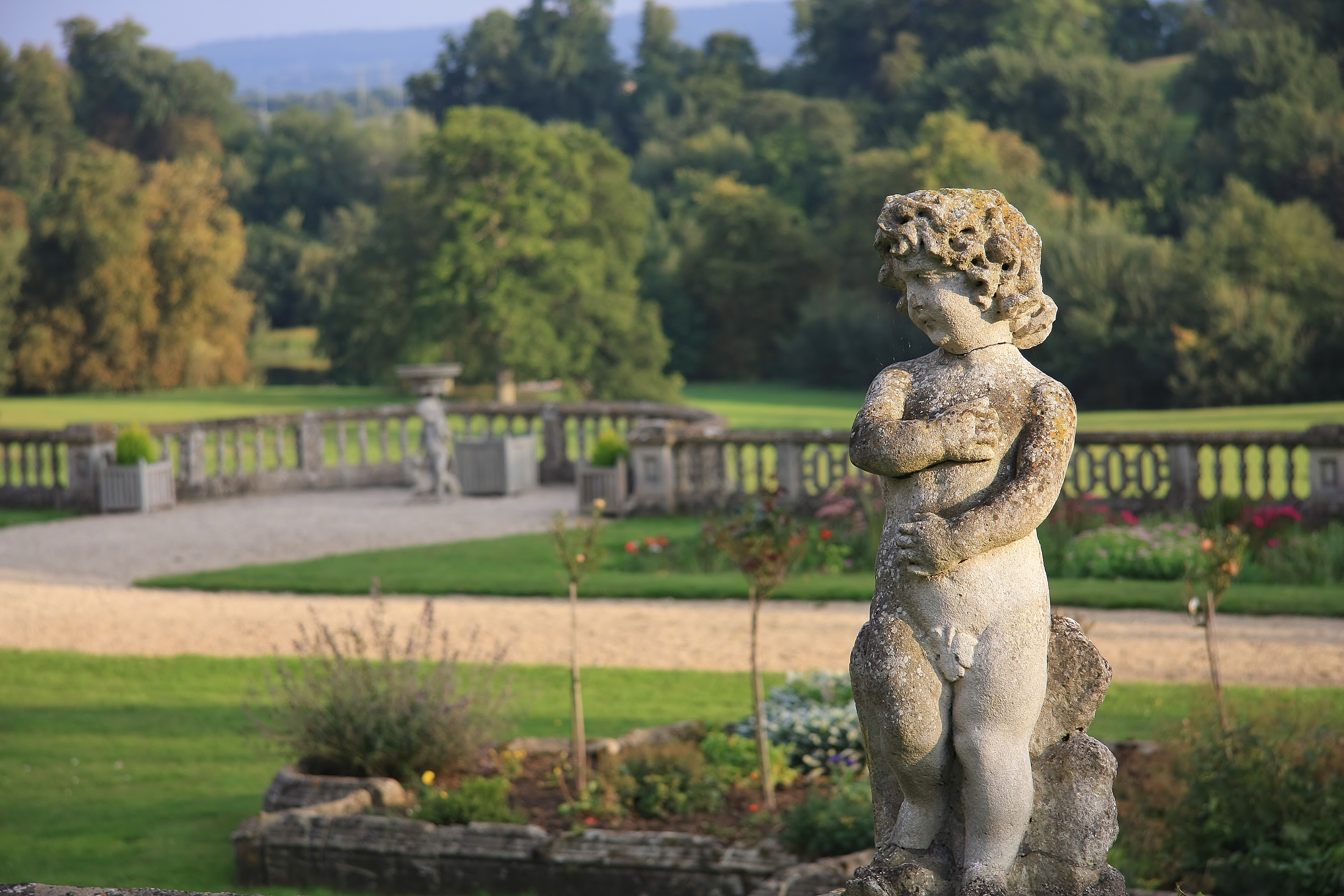
Cupid in Gardens at Orchardleigh

The Champneys, later Mostyn-Champneys Baronetcy, of Orchardleigh in the County of Somerset, was a title in the Baronetage of Great Britain. It was created on 12 January 1767 for Thomas Champneys, subsequently High Sheriff of Somerset from 1775 to 1776.

== Champneys, later Mostyn-Champneys baronets, of Orchardleigh (1767) ==
- Sir Thomas Champneys, 1st Baronet (1745–1821)
- Sir Thomas Swymmer Mostyn-Champneys, 2nd Baronet (1769–1839)

== Property ==
The 1st Baronet owned the Orchardleigh estate near Frome, where the family had been long settled, and other English properties. In 1771 he inherited from his uncle Anthony Swymmer a sizeable West Indian plantation, Nutt's River. It was in the parish of St Thomas in the East, Surrey, close to Morant Bay, Jamaica. This estate produced sugar, rum and livestock, mainly cattle. In 1810, 241 slaves were counted as part of the property.

By 1817 the total of enslaved people had grown to a total of 260, 134 males and 126 females, including children. Leaving his wife and children in England, Champneys spent several years (1784–90) in Jamaica, joining the local Trelawney Militia as an artillery superintendent, and overseeing the Windward coastal fort, in addition to being a magistrate in the parish of St Thomas in the East and St David, Surrey. His financial affairs deteriorated; his father-in-law, Richard Cox, stepped in and by the turn of the 19th century had mortgaged all Champneys' properties, his remaining manors of Orchardleigh and Frome Selwood, along with Nutt's River, foreclosing on the eventual bankruptcy. Champneys died in Orchardleigh in 1821.

== 2nd Baronet ==
Sir Thomas Champneys, 2nd Baronet, son of the 1st Baronet, married Charlotte Margaret Mostyn, daughter of Sir Roger Mostyn, 5th Baronet (see Mostyn baronets). In 1821 he assumed by Royal Sign Manual the additional surname of Mostyn. In 1822 he undertook a legal action in Chancery to recover the Nutt's River plantation and lost. He stood as parliamentary candidate for Frome following the 1832 Reform Act, a violent episode. He was childless and the title became extinct on his death in 1839. He lived at Orchardleigh and was buried at the church of St Mary the Virgin, on the estate. Cox and Co held the property until 1854.

== Retail park ==
The name is now used for a large shopping development in Llandudno, Mostyn Champneys Retail Park.

== See also ==
- Dalrymple-Champneys baronets

Baronetage of Great Britain
Preceded by Wolff baronets	Champneys baronets of Orchardleigh; 26 January 1767	Succeeded by Foley baronets
