= Church of All Saints, Lullington =

Church in Somerset, England

Church of All Saints
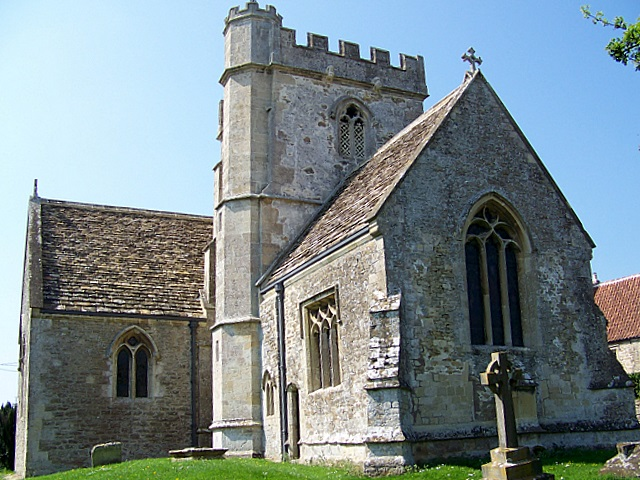

- Location within Somerset

General information
- Location: Lullington, Somerset, England
- Coordinates: 51.2663°N 2.3120°W
- Completed: 12th century

The Church of All Saints is a Church of England parish church in Lullington, Somerset, England.

== History ==
The earliest parts of this church date back to the 12th century, while the south aisle dates to around 1280, and the chancel, tower and south porch to circa 1450. The church was restored in 1862 by Thomas Henry Wyatt and is now a Grade I listed building.

It has a two bay chancel and three-stage tower, while the north door of the church has a tree of life tympanum.

The interior includes a highly decorated font inscribed with "Hoc Fontis Sacro Peveunt Delicta Lavacro", which roughly translates to "in the sacred washing of the font sins are cleansed".

=== Notable clergy ===
Henry Waldegrave, 11th Earl Waldegrave was the rector of the village in the early 20th century.

== Present day ==
The Anglican parish is part of the benefice of Beckington with Standerwick, Berkley, Lullington, Orchardleigh and Rodden within the archdeanery of Wells.

The church stands in the Conservative Evangelical tradition of the Church of England. The church uses the Book of Common Prayer, rather than the more modern Common Worship, for its services, and is a member of the Prayer Book Society.

== See also ==
- List of Grade I listed buildings in Mendip
- List of towers in Somerset
- List of ecclesiastical parishes in the Diocese of Bath and Wells
