= Church of All Saints, Rodden =

Church in Somerset, England

Church of All Saints
- Location within Somerset
- 51.2283°N 2.2895°W
- Location: Rodden, Somerset, England

History
- Built: 1640

Listed Building – Grade II*
- Official name: Church of All Saints
- Designated: 11 March 1968
- Reference no.: 1058893

The Anglican Church of All Saints in Rodden, Somerset, England, was built in 1640. It is a Grade II* listed building.

== History ==
The church was built in 1640, on the site of an earlier medieval church. Although it served only a small community, the church was built on the orders of Archbishop William Laud. He was an autocratic clergyman and sought to reduce the influence of Puritans, after which Laudianism is named.

The church was dedicated to St Blaize, and served as a chapelry of Boyton, some 11 miles (18 km) to the south-east in Wiltshire, both Rodden and Boyton being estates of the Giffard family in the 13th century. The date this arrangement ended, and Rodden became a separate parish, is unclear. It is described as a chapelry in a correction note to the 1811 Census but the 1831 Census Abstract states the separation occurred in 1784. John Collinson, published in 1791, has Rodden as a chapelry of Boyton. Another source gives the creation date of Rodden ecclesiastical parish as 1802.

The church was rebuilt in a Victorian restoration in the mid-19th century.

The benefice was united with that of Berkley in 1964. Today the parish is part of the benefice of Beckington with Standerwick, Berkley, Lullington, Orchardleigh and Rodden, which was created in 1978, within the Diocese of Bath and Wells.

== Architecture ==
The stone building has a three-bay nave and one-bay chancel with tile roofs. The west tower is supported by diagonal buttresses. The majority of the interior dates from its restoration in the 19th century, but it retains its 18th-century pulpit.

== Present day ==
The church, in spite of its isolated location, continues to have services once or twice a month.

== See also ==
- List of ecclesiastical parishes in the Diocese of Bath and Wells
