= Church of St Mary, Laverton =

Church in Somerset, England

Church of St Mary
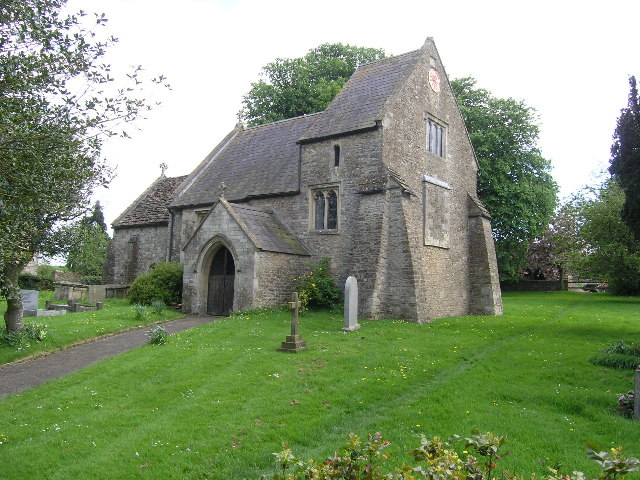

- Location within Somerset
- 51.2757°N 2.3194°W
- Location: Laverton, Somerset, England

History
- Built: 11th century

Listed Building – Grade II*
- Official name: Church of St Mary
- Designated: 11 March 1968
- Reference no.: 1366309

The Anglican Church of St Mary in Laverton, Lullington, Somerset, England was built in the 11th century. It is a Grade II* listed building.

== History ==
The church was built in the 11th century and restored in the 15th and 19th centuries. Surviving parts of the Norman structure include the entrance arch and pillars.

The parish is part of the Hardington Vale benefice within the Diocese of Bath and Wells.

== Architecture ==
The stone building has a slate and tile roof. It consists of a nave and chancel each of one bay. The west tower is supported by diagonal buttresses. The tower used to house three bells but only one remains.
