= Church of St Philip and St James, Norton St Philip =

Church in Somerset, England

Church of St Philip and St James
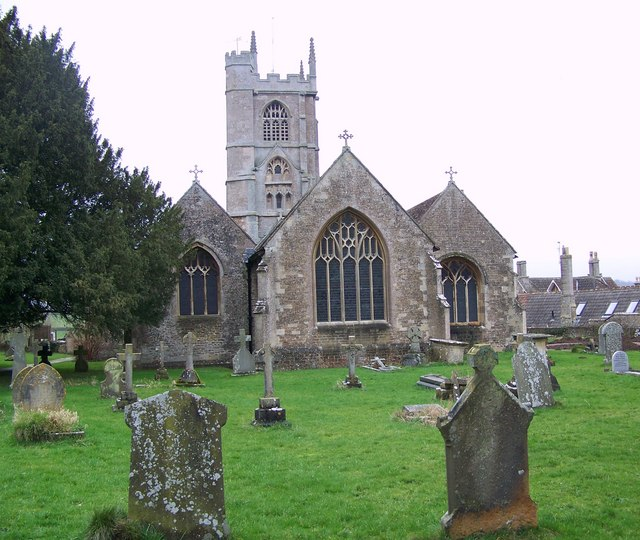

- Location within Somerset
- 51°18′01″N 2°19′41″W
- Location: Norton St Philip, Somerset, England

History
- Built: 13th and 14th century

Listed Building – Grade II*
- Designated: 11 March 1968
- Reference no.: 1345373

The Church of St Philip and St James in Norton St Philip within the English county of Somerset is a Grade II* listed building.

The parish is part of the Hardington Vale benefice within the archdeaconry of Wells.

== History ==
The current building has elements dating back from the 13th and 14th centuries, however it is likely there was a church on the site before the Norman Conquest.

In 1345 the fair which had been granted to Hinton Priory was transferred to Norton St Philip which provided much of the income for the church.

Samuel Pepys visited the church in the 17th century and described the tomb of one of the Knights Templar which is now thought to be that of a lawyer or merchant from 1460. He also described the story of the "Fair Maids of Foscott", believed to be conjoined twins from a local village now known as Foxcote.

The north aisle was probably added in the 17th century.

A major Victorian restoration was undertaken by George Gilbert Scott in the 1840s. In 2000 further restoration work was undertaken with new wood and steel vestry, toilets and meeting facilities being installed. As a result of this work, known as "The Hub", and the services it provides to the community, the church was awarded the Village Church for Village Life Award in 2008.

== Architecture ==
The building is made of rubble Doulting Stone which is rough in some areas with more finely dressed ashlar to the south and east sides, which was probably added during 19th century renovation. It has a slate roof above an oak barrel roof and a three-stage west tower.

The tower has a clock by Benjamin Lewis Vulliamy and Charles Frodsham dating from 1841, and six bells.

The east window has stained glass by Christopher Webb. In other windows there is much older glass.

The memorials in the church include one to a soldier slain in Norton St Philip in 1643 during the English Civil War. There were further military casualties in the village during a skirmish in the Monmouth Rebellion.
