= Longleat Priory =

Former priory in Wiltshire, England

- Location within Wiltshire
- Interactive map of Longleat Priory

Monastery information
- Full name: St Radegund's Priory
- Order: Augustinian Canons
- Established: Before 1233
- Disestablished: 1529
- Mother house: A "peculiar" under the control of the Dean of Salisbury
- Dedication: St Radegund
- Diocese: Diocese of Salisbury
- Controlled churches: Rushall, Wiltshire; Lullington, Somerset

People
- Founder: Sir John Vernon (thought to be)

Site
- Location: Longleat, United Kingdom
- Coordinates: 51.1857°N 2.2743°W
- Visible remains: Incorporated into the cellars of Longleat House

Longleat Priory was a priory near Warminster, Wiltshire, in the south of England. A short-lived priory was established and dissolved near to Longleat in the 12th century. The main priory was established before 1233 and was under the control of the Dean of Salisbury until its dissolution in 1529.

The site is currently occupied by Longleat House.

== History ==
The first Augustinian canons at Longleat established themselves in the 12th century at Langley, in Selwood Forest, approximately two miles from the current Longleat House, in a priory dedicated to Saint Mary. This establishment did not last long, however, and following its demise the manor of Langley and St Algar's chapel were transferred to Cirencester Abbey.

A second priory, dedicated to St Radegund, was established at Longleat, on the site of the current Longleat House, at some point before 1235, although the exact date is unknown. The priory was endowed by with lands in Selwood Forest by Sir John Vernon, who is thought to be the founder of the priory. Sir John also made a donation of four acres of land in Ansty.

By 1257 the priory had acquired lands at "Baycliff in Horningsham" and by 1291 had acquired further lands in Longleat and Stourton in Wiltshire and land in Batcombe, Laverton, Lullington and Nunney, all in Somerset. In 1291, it is recorded that this land provided the priory with an income of £5 17s. 7d.

The priory acquired further lands by a donation from Robert le Bor in 1324. He gave lands at Ansty, Codford, Hill Deverill, Horningsham, Longbridge Deverill, and Warminster.

The priory appears to have been very small and may have had revenue problems. During the reign of King Richard II (1377–1399) the priory is recorded as home to a prior, at the time Richard Axebridge, and five other canons, but the priory's income does not appear to have been adequate to support even so few.

Attempts were made to improve the situation in the following years. In 1402 the priory was granted the right to grant an "indulgence" to those who donated money for the repair of the priory and priory church: this "indulgence" was that the prior and priests would hear the donor's confessions. The priory also continued to make acquisitions and receive donations in order to improve its revenues. In 1393 it was granted control of the church at Lullington, Somerset, and in 1407 Sir Walter Hungerford (later 1st Baron Hungerford) donated the advowson of the church in Rushall, Wiltshire, of which he was lord of the manor.

Longleat Priory had no motherhouse; instead, it was controlled as a peculiar (an extra-diocesan place of worship) by the Dean of Salisbury, who held ultimate control over the priory and had to give his consent to the canons' choice following their election of a prior. Dean (and later Bishop) of Salisbury John Chandler visited the Priory on 1 October 1408, having four years earlier given his permission to the canon's elected prior, Peter Sampson. Chandler recorded that "all was well" at the priory, and that, at the time, it was home to the prior and four canons.

== Fate ==
By the 16th century, the priory's longstanding financial problems caught up with it. The priory was suppressed in 1529, six years before King Henry VIII's dissolution of the lesser monasteries in 1535. Its land and property were sold or transferred to the Carthusian Hinton Priory in Somerset, and in 1534 was recorded as providing them income of £21 16s 8d.

In 1539, Hinton Priory was itself dissolved. The steward of Hinton Priory, another Sir Walter Hungerford, hoped to secure the former priory at Longleat following the dissolution, but failed. In 1540 the former priory was granted to Sir John Horsey, and then to Edward Seymour, 1st Earl of Hertford, who, in June 1541, sold the former priory to Sir John Thynne, ancestor of the Marquesses of Bath, for £53.

The site became a private residence by 1546, but it is unclear how much of the former priory this building incorporated, or whether a new building had been constructed. Whichever was the case, this building burned down in 1568 and a new building was constructed before 1580, the current Longleat House—although it must have been substantially completed by 1574 as it received a visit from Queen Elizabeth I and her court. The last remains of the priory have been incorporated into the cellars of Longleat House.

== Priors of Longleat ==
A list of the known Priors of Longleat (thus incomplete as not all are known)

- Richard, occurs during the reign of King Henry III (1216–1272)
- William, occurs 1322
- Henry, occurs 1334
- Richard Axebridge, occurs 1381
- John Frome, died 1404
- Peter Sampson, elected 1404 and still prior in 1408
- John Pert, occurs 1419
- John Rigge (or Bigge(?)), mentioned as "prior of Langlete", in 1452.
- John Mapull, occurs 1489–90
- John Hore, occurs 1498
- Thomas Pumbery, occurs 1518
