= Foley baronets =

Extinct Great Britain baronetcy

Escutcheon of the Foley baronets of Thorpe Lee

The Foley baronetcy, of Thorpe Lee in the County of Surrey, was a title in the Baronetage of Great Britain. It was created on 1 July 1767 for the banker Robert Ralph Foley. He was the son of Robert Foley and his wife Mary Mackland, and grandson of the ironmaster Philip Foley of Prestwood, Stourbridge. The title became extinct on his death in 1782. His seat was also Halstead Place in Kent.

== Foley baronets, of Thorpe Lee (1767) ==
- Sir Robert Ralph Foley, 1st Baron (c. 1727–1782)

Baronetage of Great Britain
Preceded by Champneys baronets	Foley baronets of Thorpe Lee; 1 July 1767	Succeeded by Hort baronets
