= Church of St Mary, Berkley =

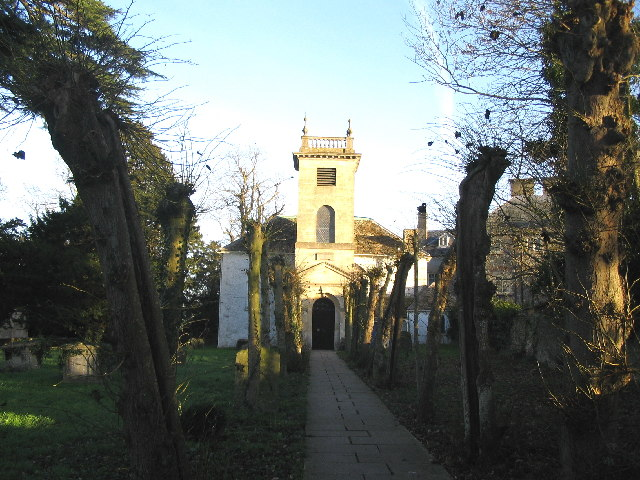

- Location within Somerset
- 51°14′37″N 2°16′19″W
- Location: Berkley, Somerset
- Country: England
- Denomination: Church of England
- Churchmanship: Conservative Evangelical

History
- Status: Active

Architecture
- Functional status: Parish church
- Heritage designation: Grade II* listed
- Designated: 11 March 1968
- Completed: 1751

The Church of St Mary is a Church of England parish church in Berkley, Somerset. It is a Grade II* listed building built in 1751.

== History ==
The church, dedicated to St Mary, was built in 1751 by Squire Thomas Prowse of the adjacent Berkley House.

The whitewashed stone church has a west tower and a hip roof with stone slates, while the nave has a central glazed cupola. Both this cupola and the organ have been recently restored. There are a pair of 17th century panel backed chairs. The font, pulpit and pews date from the mid 19th century.

=== Grounds ===
The walls and gate piers around the church date from the mid 18th century.

The graveyard contains the graves of the local population including some notable tombs. The tomb of William Hall is made of Doulting Stone and dates from 1670. The Bath stone tomb of Joseph Singer is inscribed for several members of the Singer family from the 18th and early 19th centuries. There are also several unidentified tombs.

=== Present day ===
The parish is part of the benefice of Beckington with Standerwick, Berkley, Lullington, Orchardleigh and Rodden within the archdeanery of Wells.

The church stands in the Conservative Evangelical tradition of the Church of England.

== Services ==
There are services every Sunday morning, with a family service on the third Sunday of every month.

== Village school ==
The local school was built around 1860, near the church. It is now Berkley CofE First School, with voluntary aided status.

== See also ==
- List of ecclesiastical parishes in the Diocese of Bath and Wells
