= Orchardleigh Estate =

Country estate in Somerset, England

Orchardleigh House
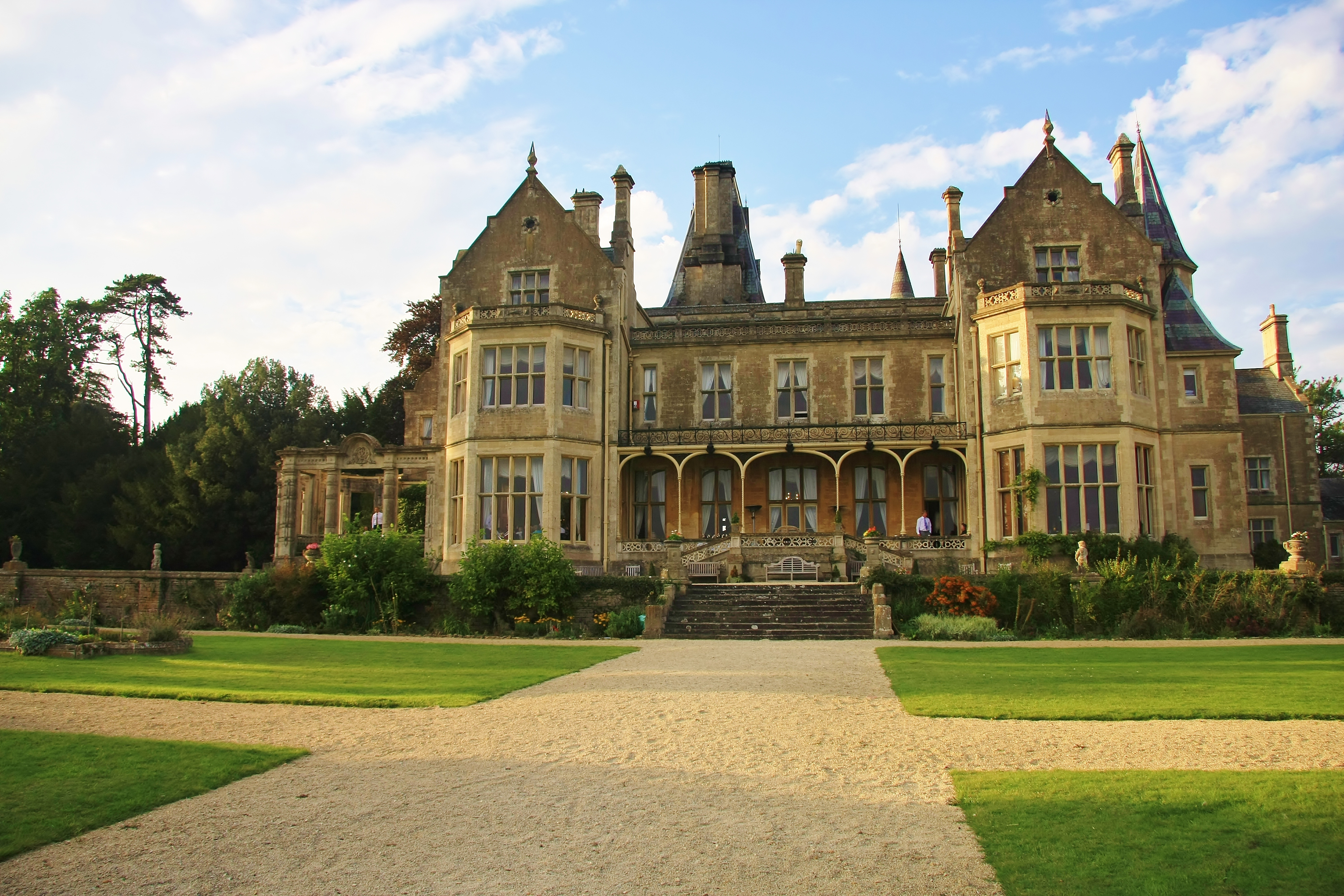

- Location within Somerset

General information
- Location: Frome, England
- Coordinates: 51.2611°N 2.3219°W
- Completed: 1856
- Client: William Duckworth

Design and construction
- Architect: Thomas Henry Wyatt

Listed Building – Grade II
- Official name: Orchardleigh House
- Designated: 17 October 1985
- Reference no.: 1345054

Orchardleigh (also spelled Orchardlea) is a country estate in Somerset, approximately two miles north of Frome, and on the southern edge of the village of Lullington. The privately-owned estate comprises a Victorian country house, Orchardleigh Lake with its island church, and an 18-hole golf course. It operates as a wedding and events venue.

The old Orchardleigh House was just south of the church. Its heyday was the time of Sir Thomas Champneys, 1st Baronet, High Sheriff of Somerset in 1775, but all that remains of that period is the boathouse, rotunda, the Lullington gateway, and the Tudor-style lodges dating from the 1820s. The old house was demolished and the present one built in 1856 by Thomas Henry Wyatt for William Duckworth. The new house is described by Pevsner as "picturesque, irregular, and in a mixed Elizabethan style", and is a Grade II* listed building. The estate is listed at grade II* on the Register of Parks and Gardens of Special Historic Interest in England.

Within the old estate are the Orchardleigh Stones, a probable neolithic burial chamber which was excavated in 1803 and 1804, when human bones and cremation urns were discovered. The estate also includes the Church of St Mary, which dates from the 13th century and is a Grade I listed building. The churchyard contains the grave of the poet Sir Henry Newbolt. The Gloucester Lodge gatehouse was built in the early 19th century. The parish was part of the hundred of Frome.

== History ==
=== 19th and early 20th century: Duckworth family ===
William Duckworth bought the Orchardleigh estate in 1855 and built the house in 1856. He was born in 1795 in Manchester. His father was George Duckworth who was lord of the manor in Over Darwen in the parish of Blackburn. When his father died in 1815 William and his brother Samuel inherited his estates. Samuel died in 1847 and as he was unmarried he also left his fortune to William. When William bought the Orchardleigh estate in 1855 he was an extremely wealthy man and was therefore able to afford the costs of the house's construction.

In 1825 he married Hester Emily Philips who was the daughter of Robert Philips who owned an estate in Prestwich called The Park. The couple had four sons and one daughter. Their youngest son was Herbert who in 1867 married Julia Prinsep Jackson. They are both shown in a photo shortly after their marriage. The photo was taken by Leslie Stephen the author and historian who at this time was a friend of Herbert. They had become friends when students at Cambridge ten years before. Herbert died in 1870 from appendicitis and Julia was left a widow with three young children: George, later a senior civil servant, Stella and Gerald, founder of Duckworth Publishing. She married Leslie Stephen in 1878 after his wife died. They had four more children one of whom was Virginia Woolf.

William died in 1876 and his son Reverend William Arthur Duckworth inherited the house. He was born in 1829 and was educated at Eton and then went to Cambridge University. In 1859 he married Edina Campbell who was the daughter of John Campbell, 1st Baron Campbell. The couple had five daughters and two sons. The eldest son Major Arthur Campbell Duckworth inherited the house when his father died in 1917. He married in 1897 Viola Davies-Evans who was the daughter of Colonel Herbert Davies-Evans.

The couple had three children one of whom was Sylvia Duckworth. In 1924 she married Major Horton Fawkes and the reception was held at Orchardleigh. The wedding which had over 600 guests was reported in numerous papers with photographs. When Arthur Campbell Duckworth died in 1948 his son Arthur Victor Duckworth inherited the property.

=== Later 20th and 21st centuries ===
In 1986, Arthur Duckworth died, and Orchardleigh was sold. Work started on redevelopment, but in 1989 the developer's loans were called in by the bank and work ceased for 13 years. In 1998 the Vincent family bought the estate and operate it as an events venue, and have undertaken restoration.

== The estate ==
The estate includes a Palladian boathouse, a bridge incorporating a sluice, a semicircular bridge, a garden house, a summerhouse, a keepers lodge, and a stables and coachhouse. The grounds – which were landscaped by Humphrey Repton possibly – are listed at Grade II* on the Register of Parks and Gardens of Special Historic Interest in England.

== Gallery ==
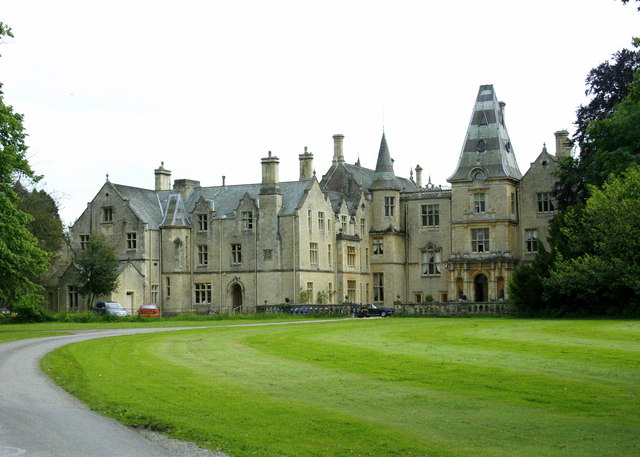
The entrance front

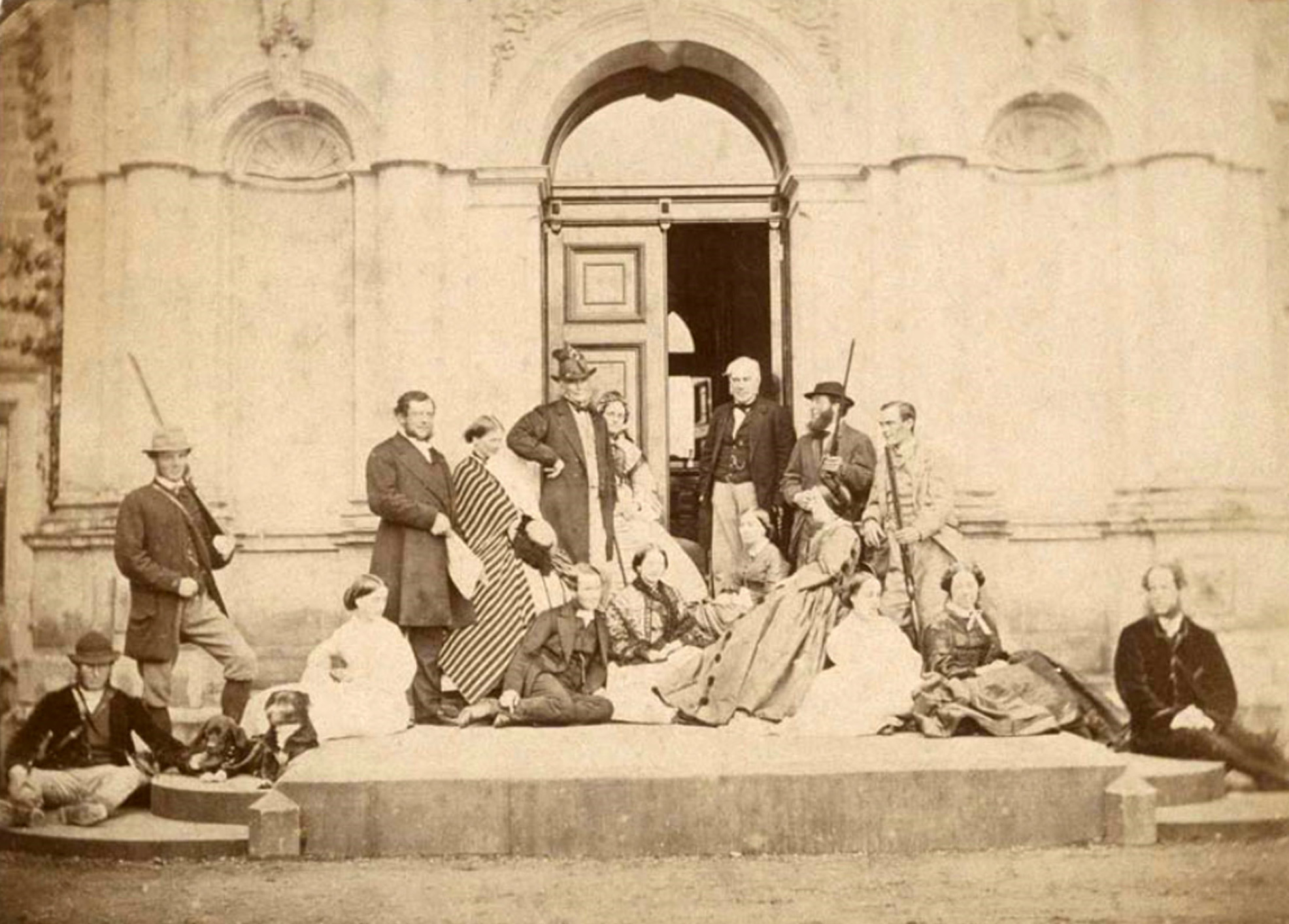
The Duckworth family at the entrance of Orchardleigh in 1867. Herbert Duckworth is on the left with the gun. Julia is sitting on the step beside him.

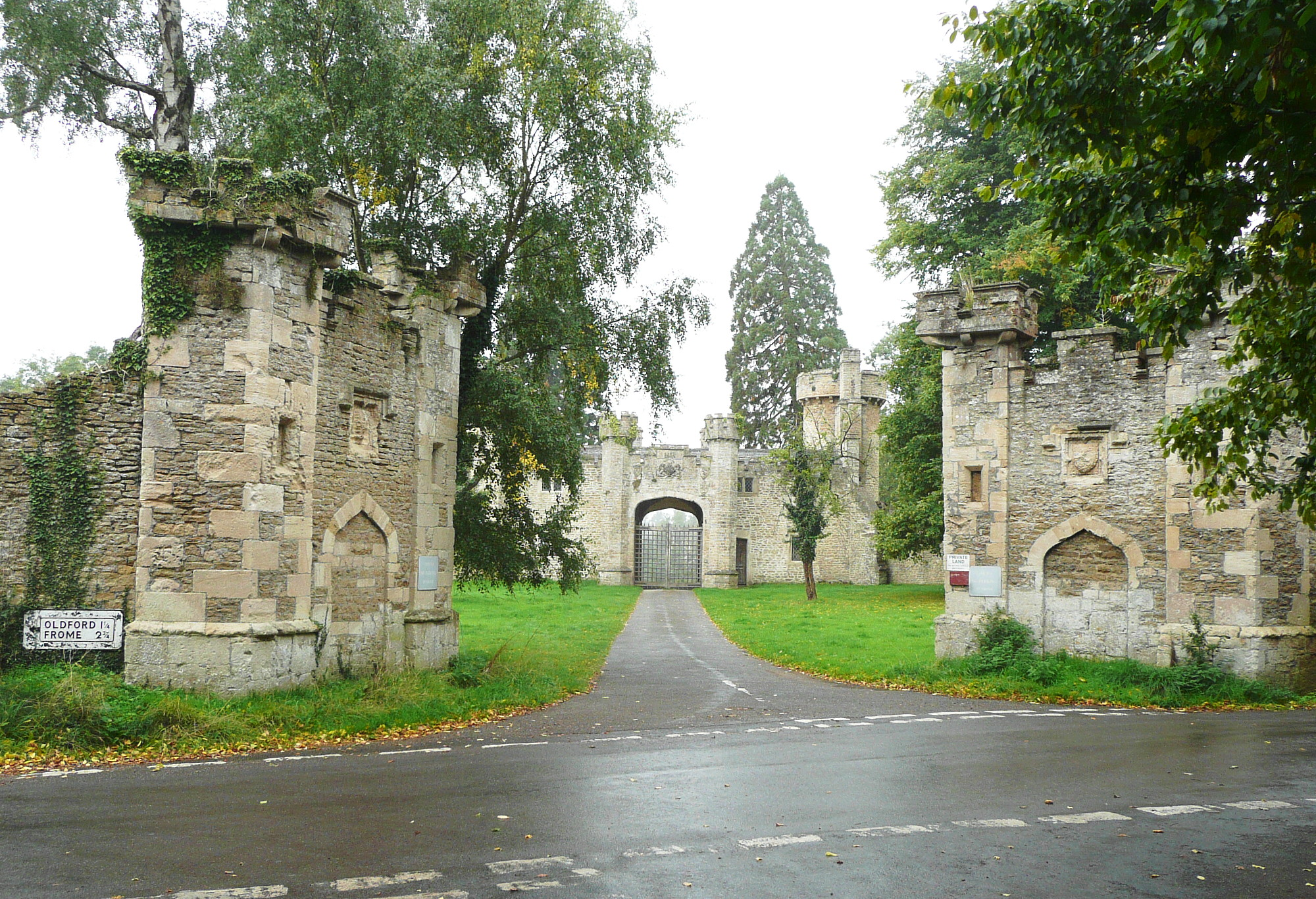
Gloucester Lodge

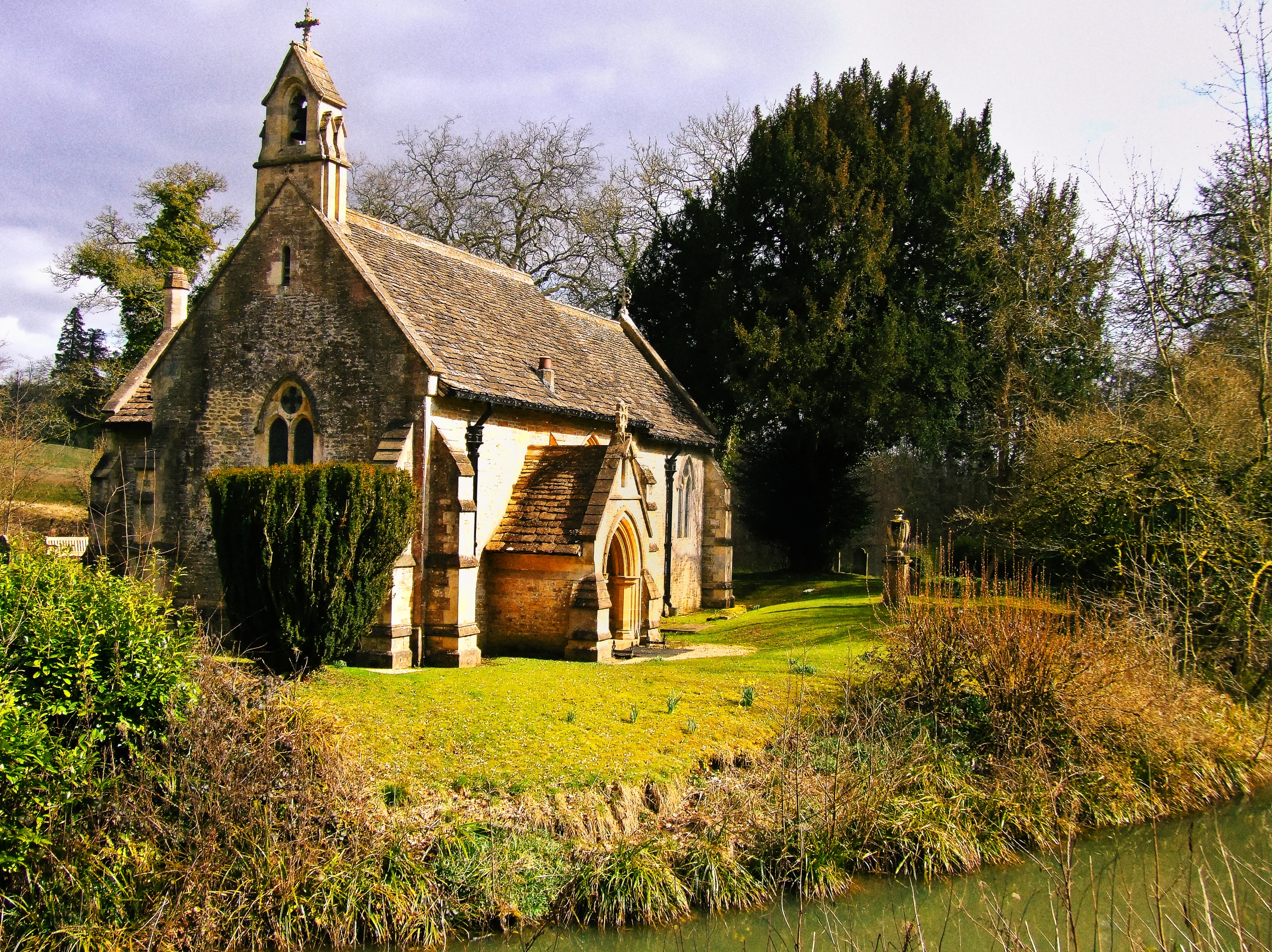
St Mary's Church
