= Norton St Philip =

Village in Somerset, England

Coordinates: 51.298°N 2.322°W

Norton Saint Philip
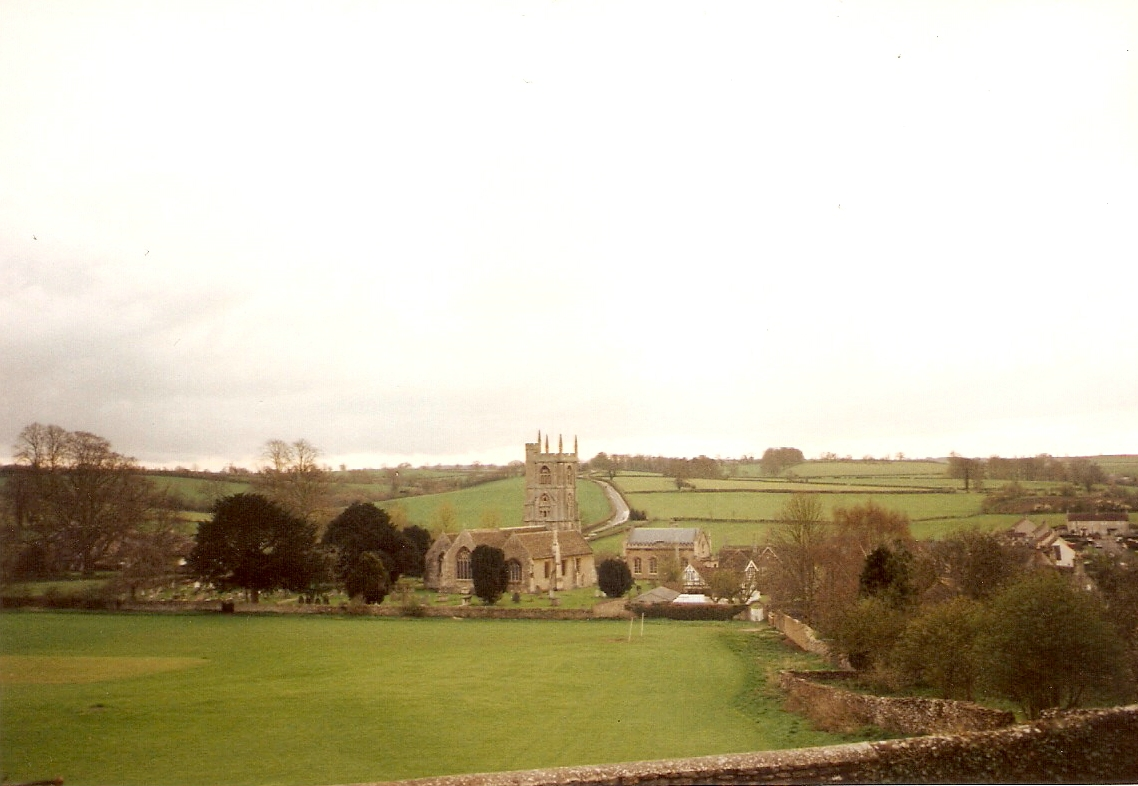
- Norton St Philip with Church of St Philip and St James

- Location within Somerset
- Population: 858 (2011 census)
- OS grid reference: ST775555
- Civil parish: Norton St Philip
- Unitary authority: Somerset
- Ceremonial county: Somerset
- Region: South West
- Country: England
- Sovereign state: United Kingdom
- Post town: BATH
- Postcode district: BA2
- Dialling code: 01373
- Police: Avon and Somerset
- Fire: Devon and Somerset
- Ambulance: South Western
- UK Parliament: Frome and East Somerset
- Website: nortonstphilipparishcouncil.gov.uk/HOME_43677.aspx

Norton St Philip is a village and civil parish in Somerset, England. The village lies about 5 1/2 miles (9 km) south of the city of Bath and 5 miles (8 km) north of the town of Frome on the eastern slopes of the Mendip Hills. It is situated on the A366 between Trowbridge and Radstock, and on the B3110 between Bath and Frome.

The village has experienced a significant reduction in local services, with the police station, post office and shops closing throughout the early 2000s. This was partly reversed by the opening of a new supermarket, incorporating a post office, in 2016.

The village is built around a village common, known as Churchmead or The Mead, which is held in trust and is home to the village cricket team.

== History ==
The earliest signs of habitation can be found a mile to the east of the current village, where the Roman road from Bath to Poole passed. The village is later recorded in the Domesday Book as supporting 20 people, three ploughs, a mill and 20 acres (81,000 m^{2}) of meadow. A priory was founded near the village in 1232 and had links with the village until its dissolution under the orders of Henry VIII on 31 March 1540. Norton developed a thriving wool trade and became the site of a regional market, signs of which can be seen in local surnames such as Weaver. The parish of Norton St Philip was part of the Wellow Hundred.

Norton St Philip was the site of the Battle of Norton St Philip during the Monmouth Rebellion in 1685, and the east–west street on the village's northern edge, officially recorded as Chevers Lane, is referred to locally as Bloody Lane, reportedly as the battle caused so much bloodshed it flowed down this hill. In the aftermath of the failed rebellion Judge Jefferies conducted 12 executions on The Mead, as part of the Bloody Assizes. The route he took to The Mead is known as Jefferies Gate.

The George Inn, in the centre of the village, has been dated by dendrochronology to the late 14th century, making it the oldest of several claimants to be Britain's oldest continually licensed tavern. It was built as a wool store for the priory at Hinton Charterhouse and to accommodate travellers and merchants coming to the annual wool fairs that were held in the village from the late 13th century until 1902. The timber-framed upper floors were added in the 15th century. The inn became part of the stage coach route between London and the South West; on 12 June 1668 the noted diarist Samuel Pepys, with his wife and servants, passed through Norton St Philip on their way to Bath from Salisbury. The inn was later used as the headquarters of Monmouth's army after his retreat from Bath, and was further used as a court by Judge Jefferies.

Faccenda operated a poultry processing plant in the village until the late 1990s, when the property burned down. The site was subsequently redeveloped for housing between 2012 and 2014, adding approximately 57 dwellings and a small supermarket to the south side of the village. The development uses materials and a style sympathetic to the local vernacular, with architectural elements inspired by local historic buildings. The development also included a building intended for use as a public space, which has since been repurposed into a residential dwelling.

== Governance ==
The parish council has responsibility for local issues, including setting an annual precept (local rate) to cover the council's operating costs and producing annual accounts for public scrutiny. The parish council evaluates local planning applications and works with the local police, district council officers, and neighbourhood watch groups on matters of crime, security, and traffic. The parish council's role also includes initiating projects for the maintenance and repair of parish facilities, as well as consulting with the district council on the maintenance, repair, and improvement of highways, drainage, footpaths, public transport, and street cleaning. Conservation matters (including trees and listed buildings) and environmental issues are also the responsibility of the council.

For local government purposes, since 1 April 2023, the parish comes under the unitary authority of Somerset Council. Prior to this, it was part of the non-metropolitan district of Mendip (established under the Local Government Act 1972). It was part of Frome Rural District before 1974.

It is also part of the Frome and East Somerset county constituency represented in the House of Commons of the Parliament of the United Kingdom. It elects one Member of Parliament (MP) by the first past the post system of election.

== Community ==
The village has a strong sense of local community, supported in part by the village pubs, The George Inn and the Fleur-de-Lys, the local primary school, and the cricket team. The village is well known in the area for hosting a large fundraising Bonfire Night celebration.

== Transport ==
Situated around the crossroads of the A366 and the B3110, the village is largely a dormitory settlement for the surrounding towns. The High Street is a congested commuting route into Bath and measures have been taken to slow down the rat run traffic through the village by the installation of bollards to inhibit traffic mounting the pedestrian footpath. After a series of traffic incidents involving damage to residents' cars, a weight limit of 7.5 t was introduced for vehicles driving through the village.

The D2/D2x bus, operated by First West of England, runs an hourly service with stops located near the cross roads in the centre of the village, and at either end of the village on the B3110.

== Religious sites ==
The church of St Philip and St James dates from the 14th century with restoration in 1847 by Sir George Gilbert Scott. It has been designated by English Heritage as a Grade II* listed building.

== Gallery of images ==
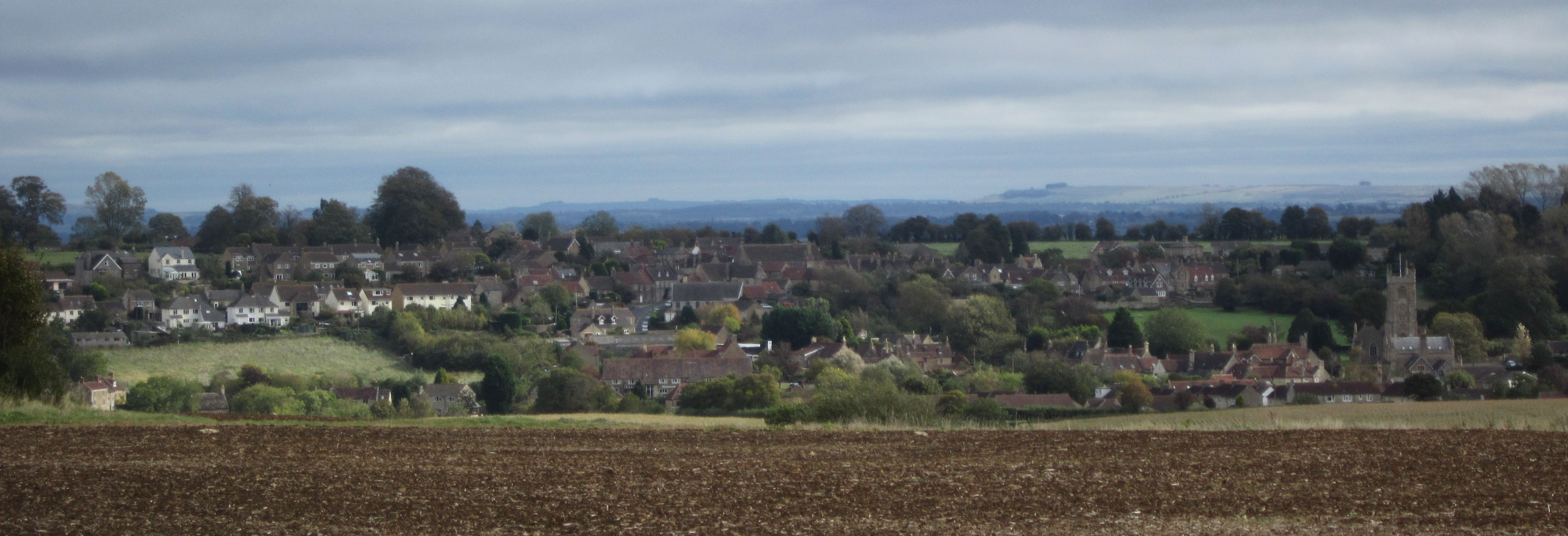
View of the village from up the hill

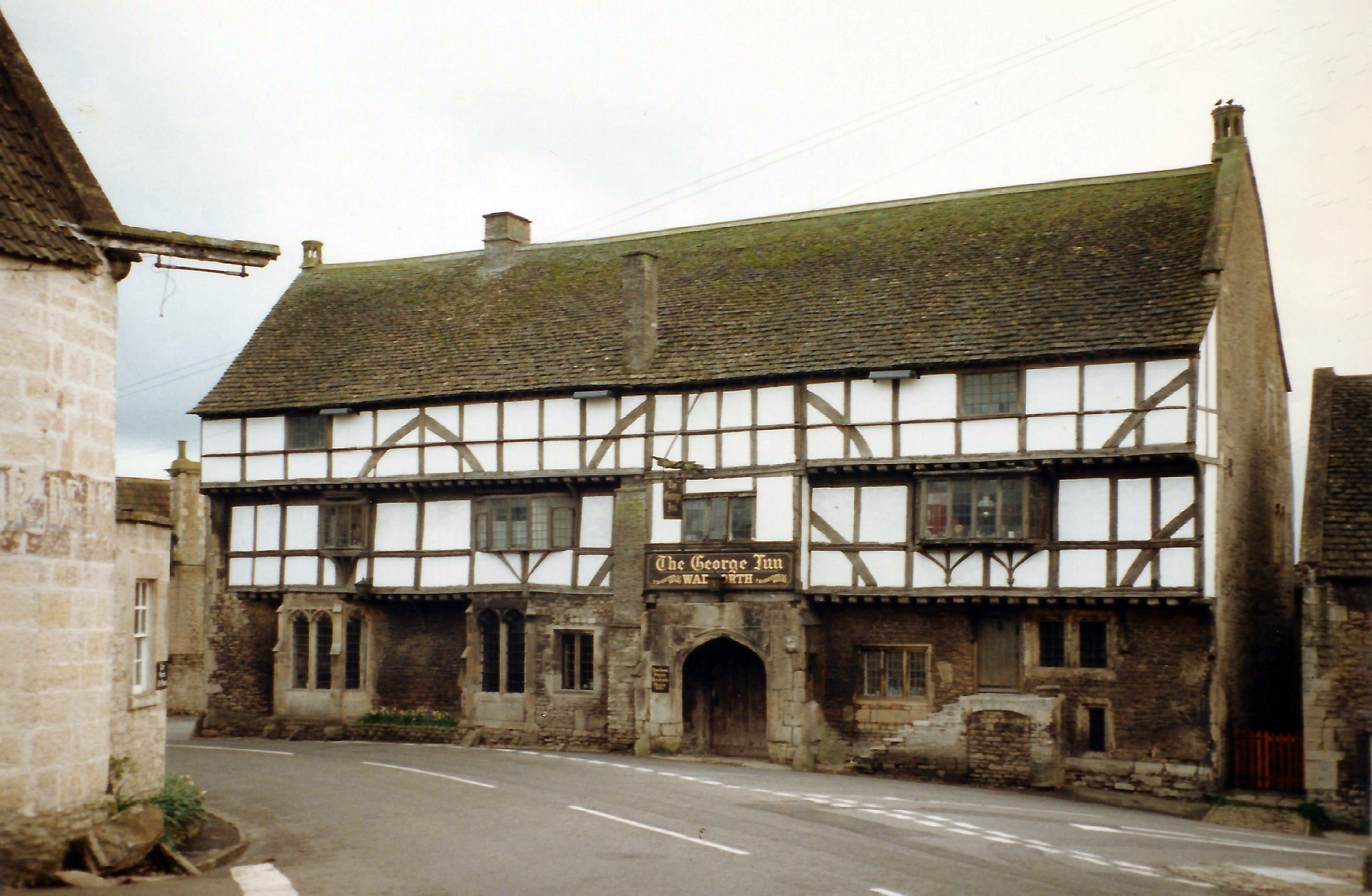
The George Inn, Norton St Philip

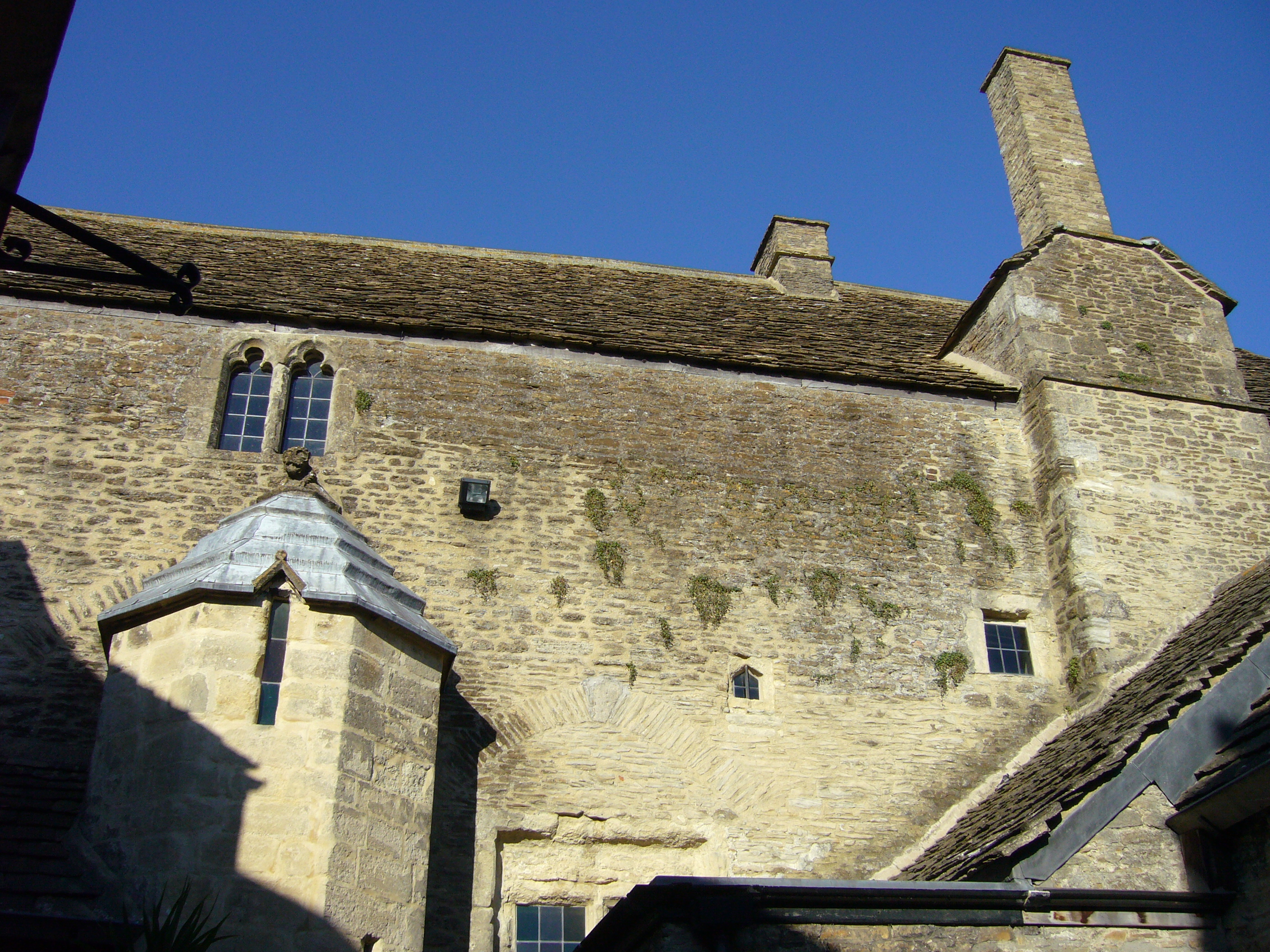
View from courtyard of the George Inn

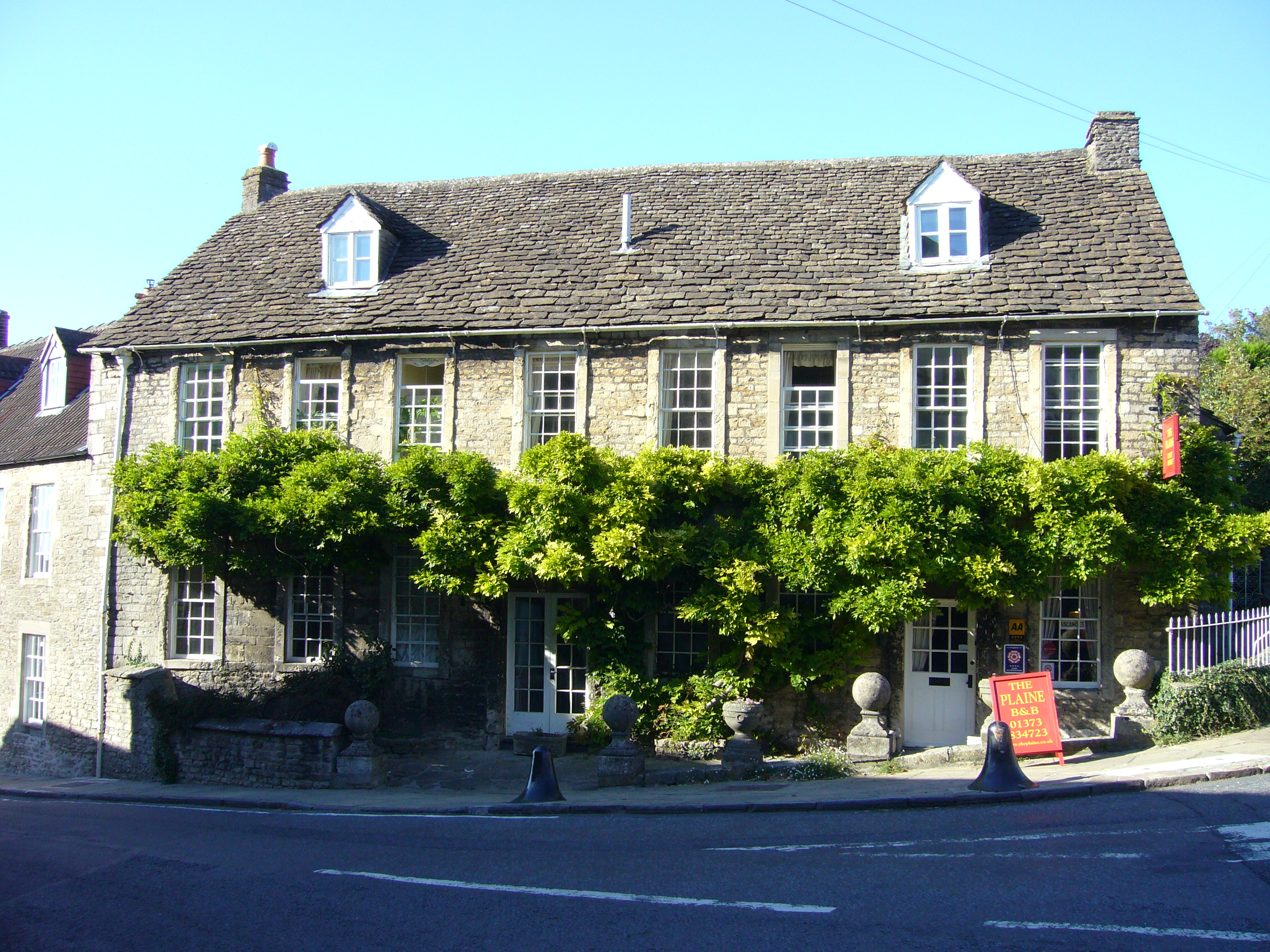
The Plaine guest house

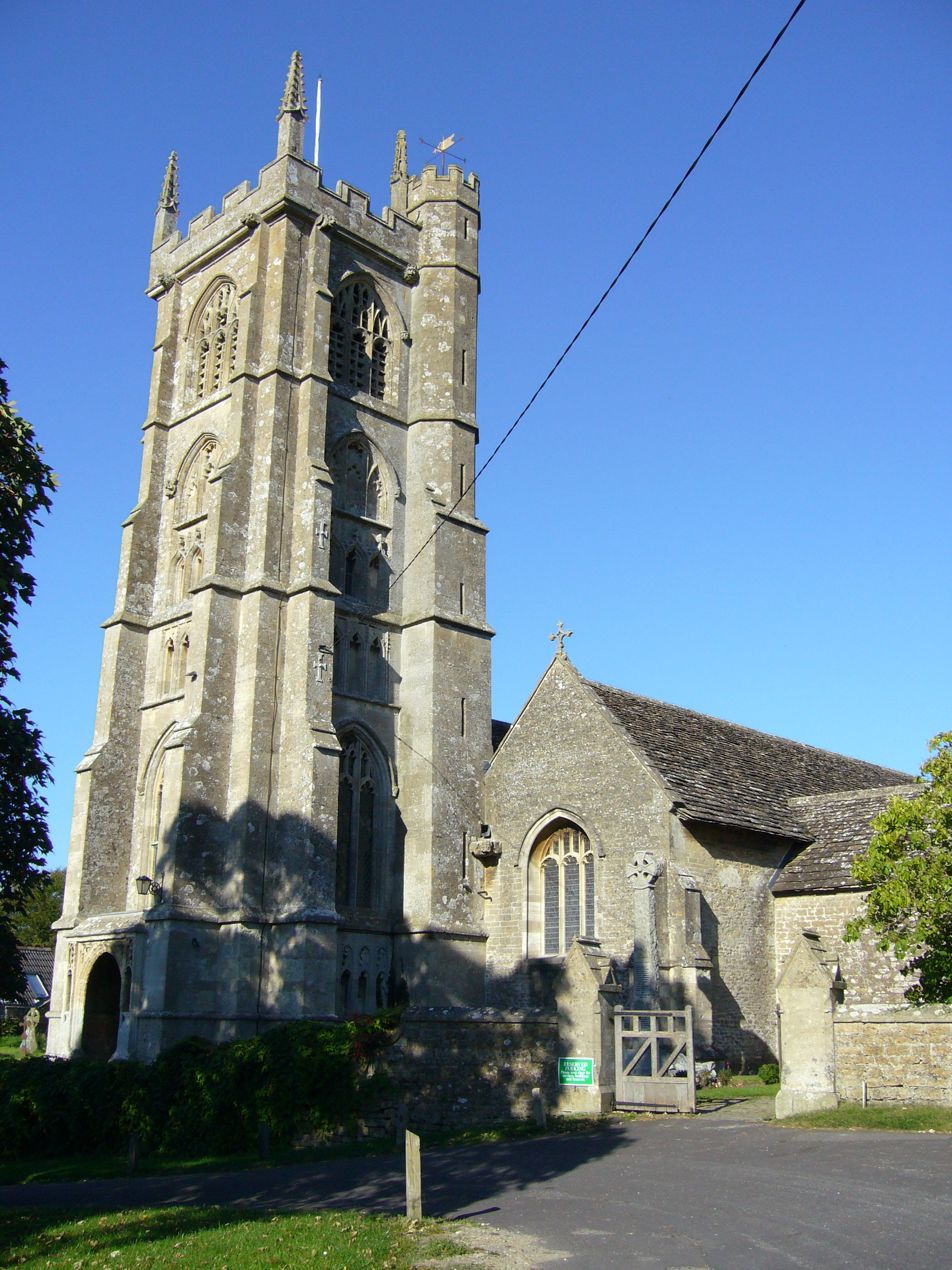
Church of St Philip and St James
