= Berkley, Somerset =

Civil parish in Somerset, England

Coordinates: 51.239°N 2.277°W

Berkley
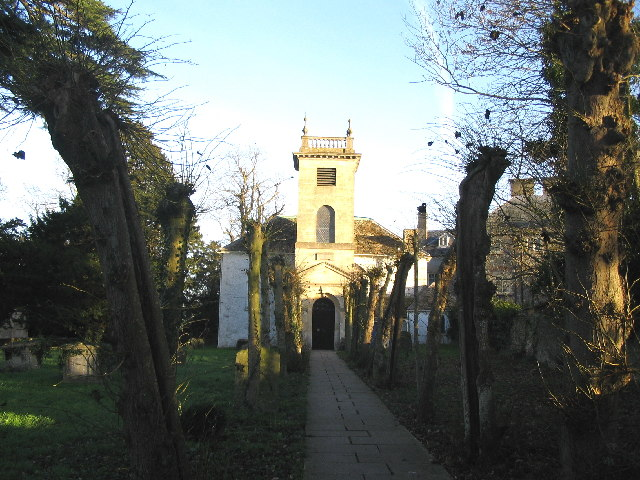
- Church of St Mary, Berkley

- Location within Somerset
- Population: 344 (2011)
- OS grid reference: ST808490
- Unitary authority: Somerset Council
- Ceremonial county: Somerset
- Region: South West
- Country: England
- Sovereign state: United Kingdom
- Post town: FROME
- Postcode district: BA11
- Dialling code: 01373
- Police: Avon and Somerset
- Fire: Devon and Somerset
- Ambulance: South Western
- UK Parliament: Frome and East Somerset

Berkley is a dispersed settlement and civil parish in Somerset, England. According to the 2011 census the parish had a population of 344. It lies on the north-east edge of the town of Frome, St Mary's church being about 2 1/4 miles (4 km) from the centre of Frome. The parish includes the hamlets of Oldford, Berkley Marsh and Standerwick, and its eastern boundary is also the county boundary with Wiltshire.

== Geography and transport ==
The parish church, Berkley House and the primary school are towards the south-east of the parish, and from there the hamlet of Berkley Marsh is about 600m to the west.

Oldford hamlet is in the far west of the parish, straddling the boundary with Selwood parish; the River Frome is a little further west. The A361 road from Trowbridge and Beckington used to descend Oldford Hill to reach Frome town centre, but in the late 20th century it was diverted south across the parish to avoid Oldford and bypass Frome to the east. The former route through Oldford was renumbered as the B3090.

The A36 between Bath and Warminster crosses the east of the parish. As it enters the parish from the north it passes through Standerwick hamlet, which is partly in Beckington parish.

The Great Western Railway built their line connecting Westbury to Frome across the parish and opened it in 1850; there was no local station.

== Governance ==
The parish council has responsibility for local issues, including setting an annual precept (local rate) to cover the council's operating costs and producing annual accounts for public scrutiny. The parish council evaluates local planning applications and works with the local police, district council officers, and neighbourhood watch groups on matters of crime, security, and traffic. The parish council's role also includes initiating projects for the maintenance and repair of parish facilities, as well as consulting with the district council on the maintenance, repair, and improvement of highways, drainage, footpaths, public transport, and street cleaning. Conservation matters (including trees and listed buildings) and environmental issues are also the responsibility of the council.

For local government purposes, since 1 April 2023, the parish comes under the unitary authority of Somerset Council. Prior to this, it was part of the non-metropolitan district of Mendip (established under the Local Government Act 1972). It was part of Frome Rural District before 1974.

It is also part of the Frome and East Somerset county constituency represented in the House of Commons of the Parliament of the United Kingdom. It elects one Member of Parliament (MP) by the first past the post system of election.

== Church ==
The Church of St Mary, which was erected in 1751, is dedicated to St Mary, and includes a recently restored organ. It is a Grade II* listed building.

== Berkley House ==
Also Grade II* listed, Berkley House is immediately south of the church. A three-storey domestic range to the rear may be 17th-century, while the two-storey front was built as a country house in the mid 18th century. The house was owned by the Prowse family, including Thomas Prowse who sat in Parliament for Somerset between 1740 and 1767; his grandfather had come into the Berkley estate by marriage.

== School ==
Berkley Church of England First School is a small village school catering for 4-to-9-year-olds.

== Notable residents ==
Alexander Barclay, author of The Ship of Fools, was a native of this village. He died in 1552.
