= Orchardleigh Lake =

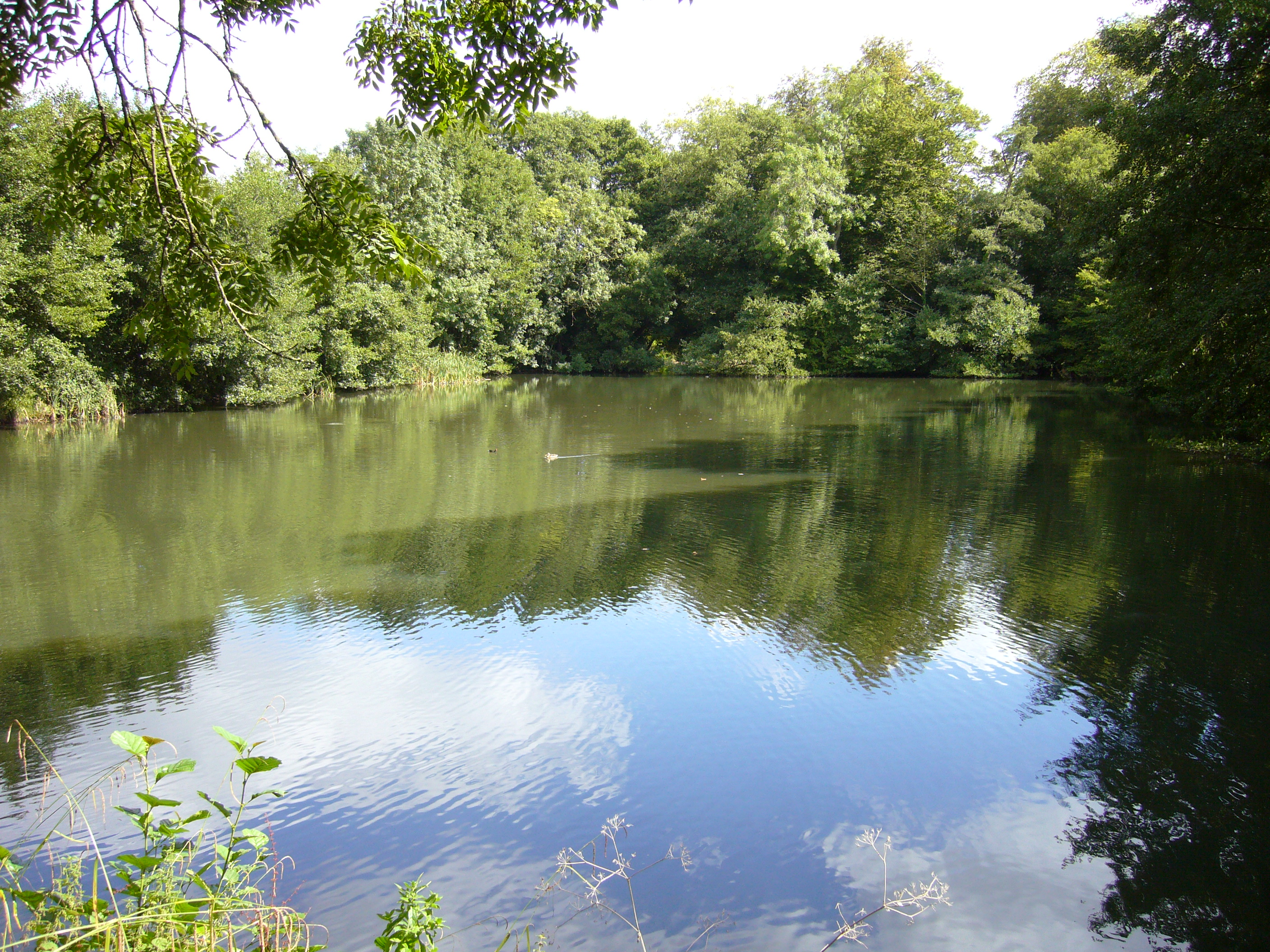
- The smaller of the two lakes as seen from the island church

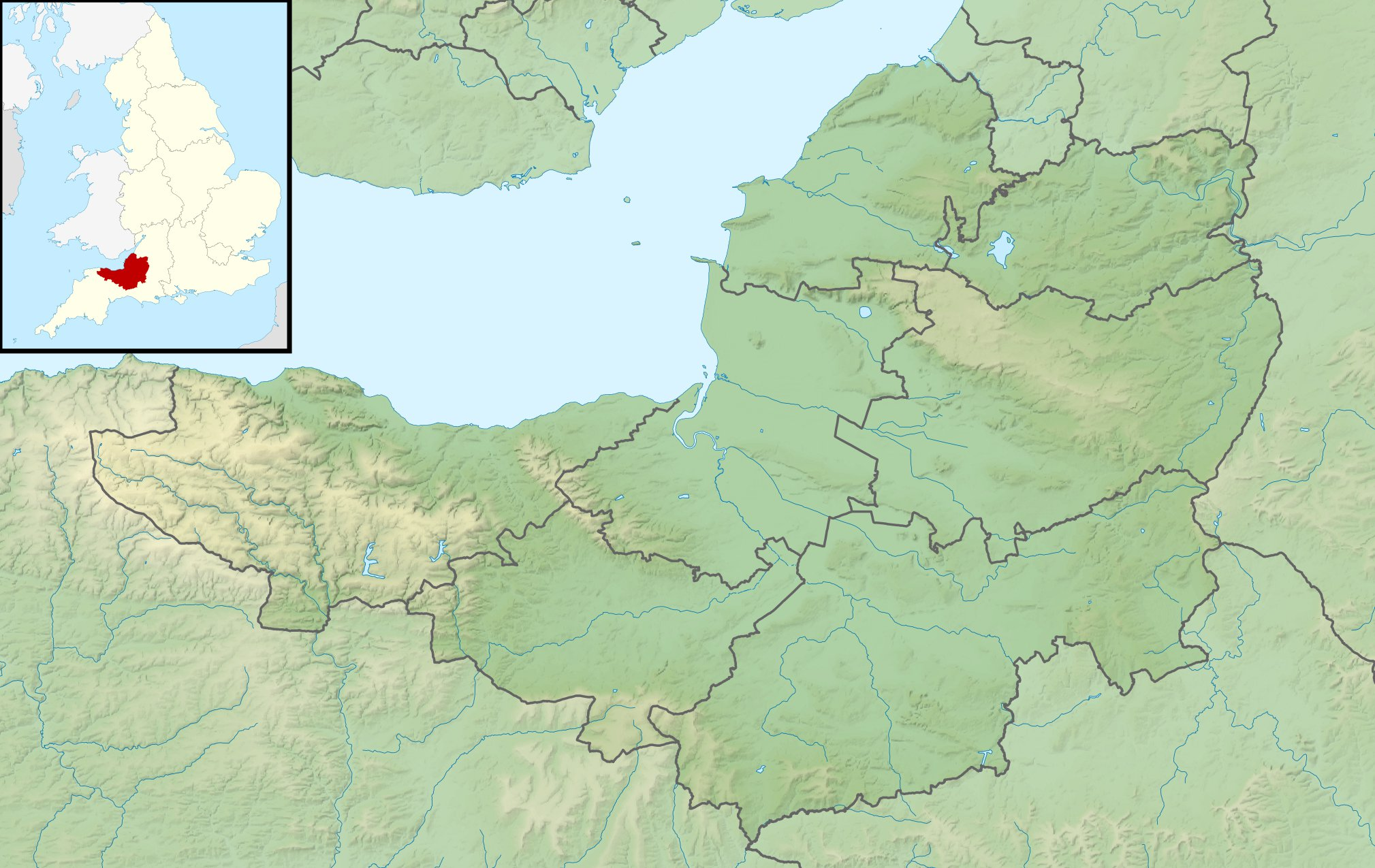
- Location within Somerset
- Location: Somerset
- Coordinates: 51.256°N 2.318°W
- Type: artificial lake
- Basin countries: United Kingdom
- Surface area: 11.23 ha (27.7 acres)
- Islands: 1

Orchardleigh Lake (also spelt Orchardlea) (grid reference ST779508) is an 11.23-hectare artificial lake in the grounds of the Orchardleigh Estate, just north of Frome, Somerset, England. It was formed by damming a tributary of the River Frome. Today, the lake is used for angling and birdwatching.

There is a small island towards the western side of lake where St Mary's Church can be found. It was built in the 13th century, and underwent extensive renovation by Sir George Gilbert Scott in 1878. It has been designated as a Grade I listed building. Weddings are often performed at the church, which has capacity for 120 guests. It is reached from the lakeside via a footbridge, and a public footpath runs nearby over another bridge across the lake.

There are two lakes: a small one overlooked by the island church, and a much larger one approximately 150 metres away through a wooded area to the east, which has a stone-built boathouse.

== Birds ==
In 1932 a pair of black-necked grebes bred at the lake, the only occasion on which this species has been recorded breeding in Somerset. The lake regularly hosts small numbers of common waterfowl, including breeding little and great crested grebes and mute swan, and wintering tufted duck and pochard. Rarer species have occasionally been sighted:

- Ring-necked duck (male), March 1997
- Great white egret, September 2005
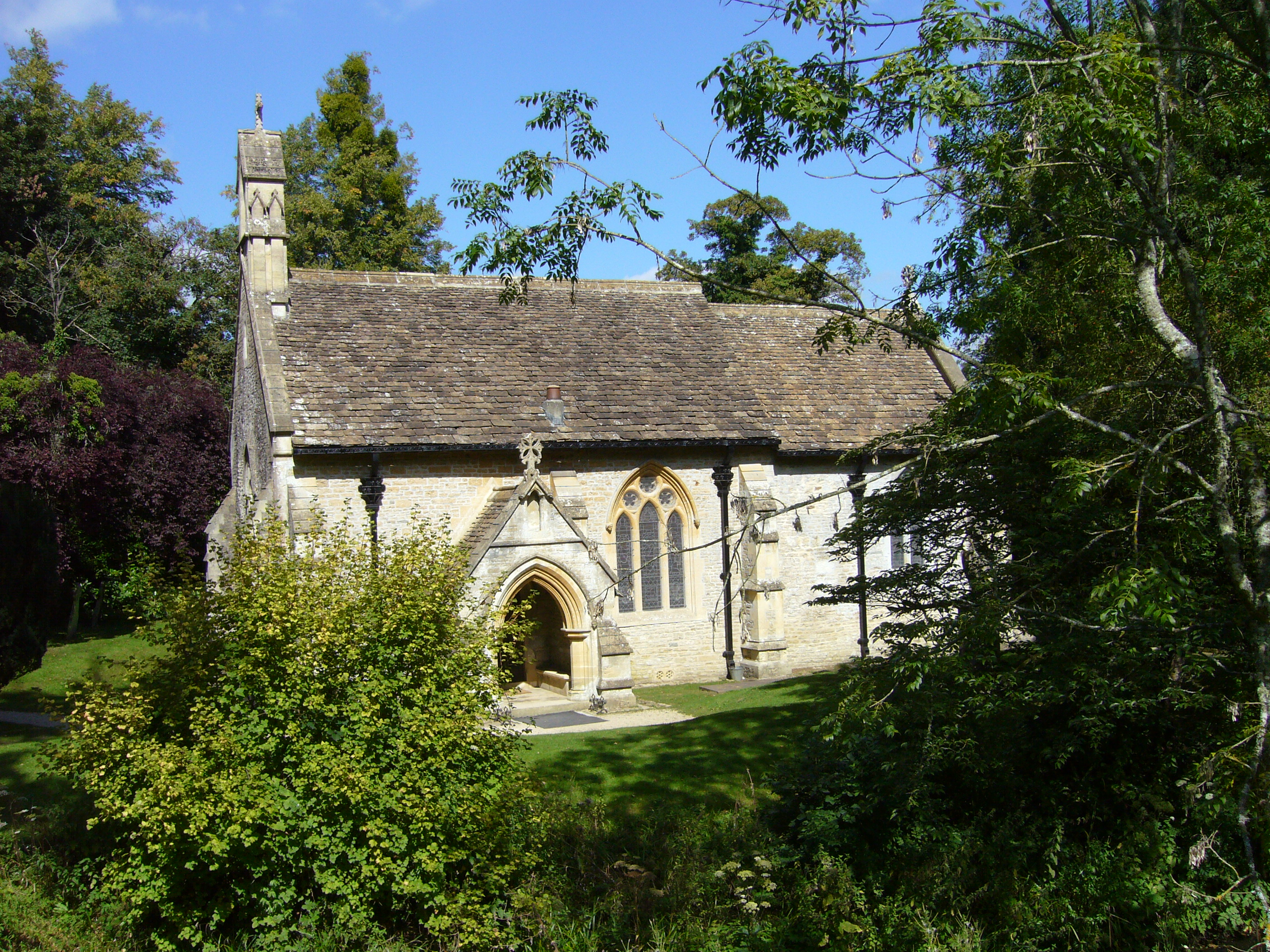
Side view of the island church

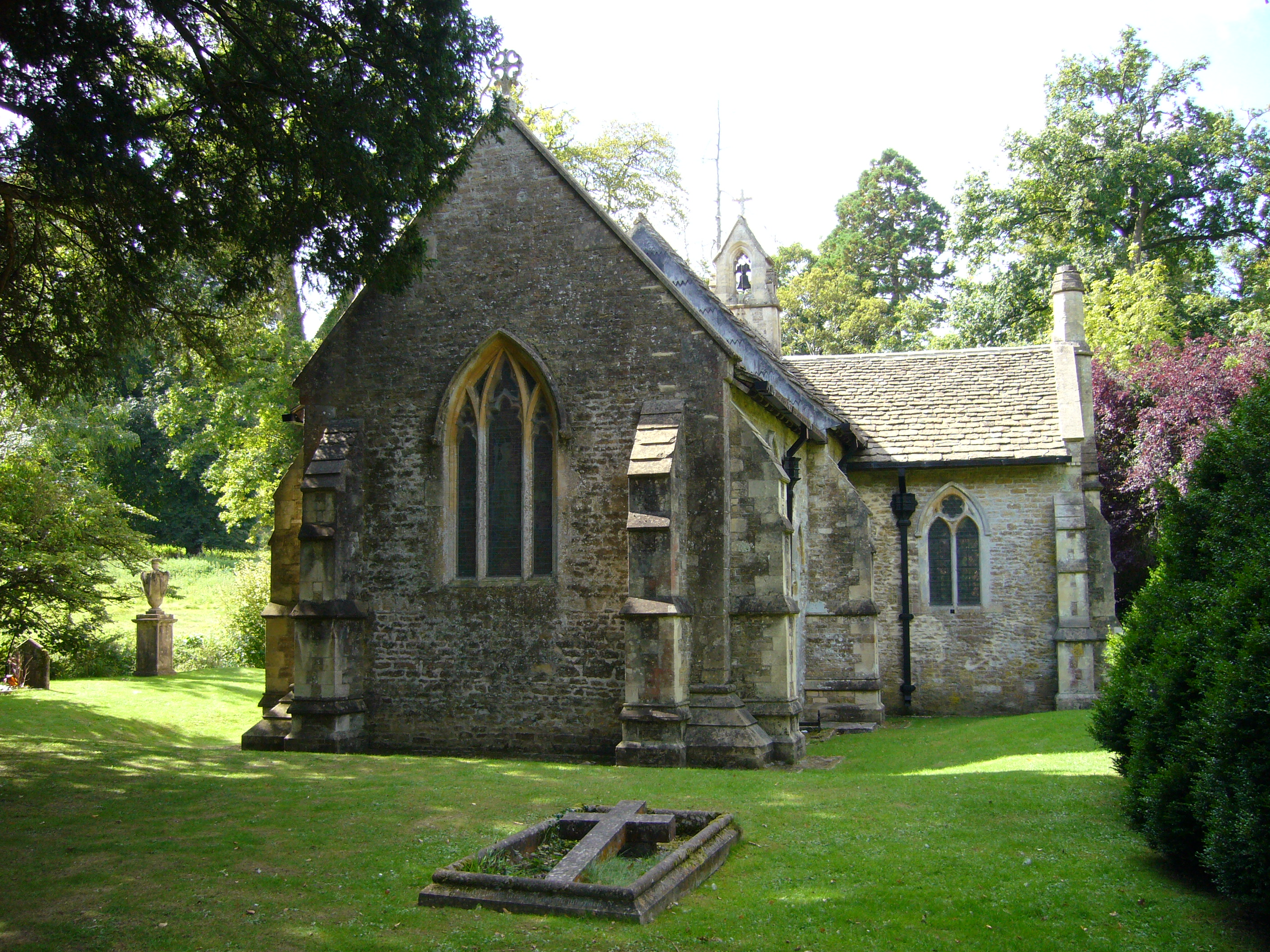
Rear view of the island church
