= Hinton Priory =

Monastery in Somerset, England

Coordinates: 51.3313°N 2.3199°W

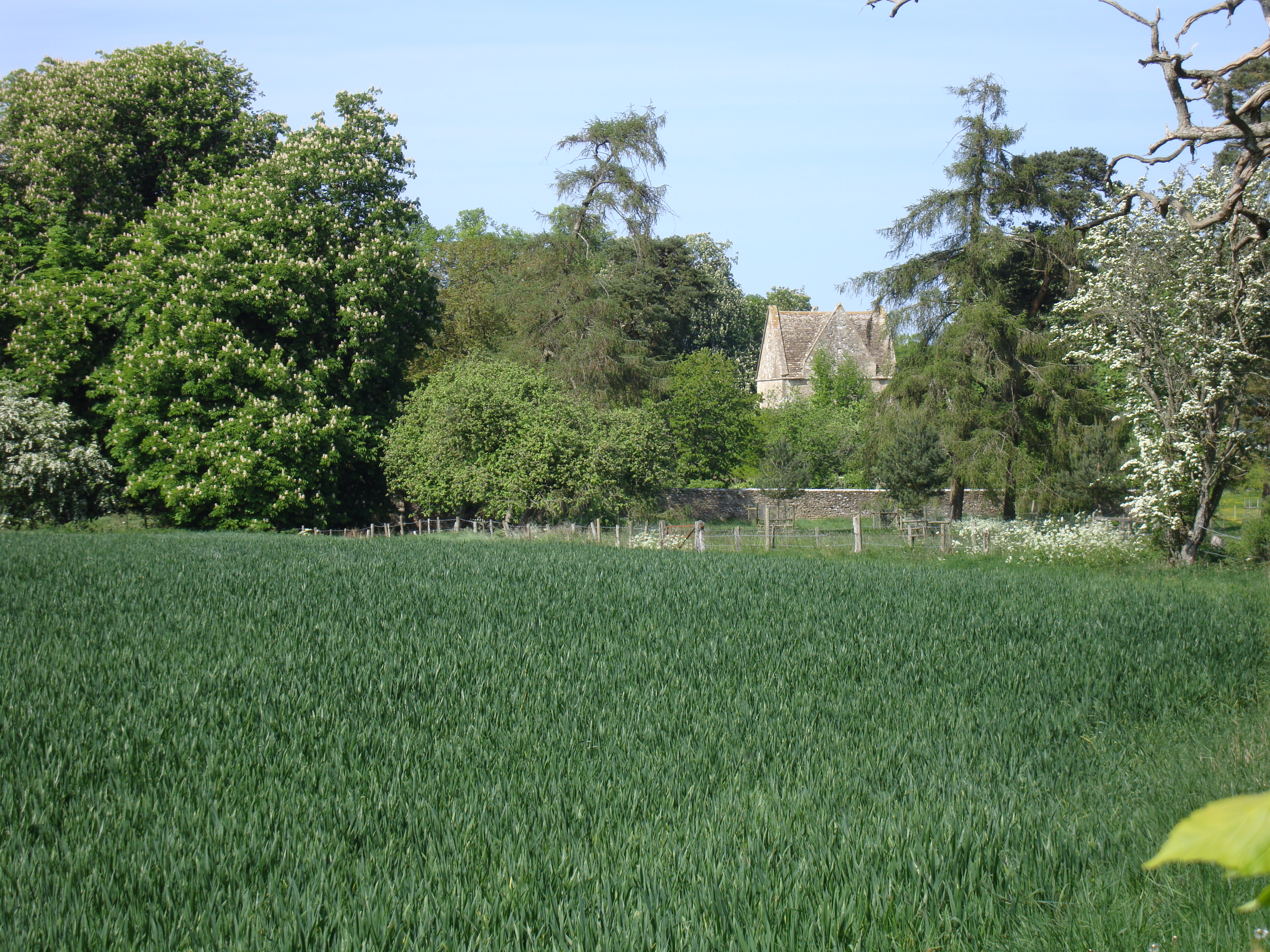
- Interactive map of Hinton Priory

Monastery information
- Order: Carthusian
- Established: 1227
- Disestablished: 1539

People
- Founders: Ela, Countess of Salisbury
- Important associated figures: William Longspee, Earl of Salisbury

Site
- Location: Hinton Charterhouse, Somerset, England
- Grid reference: ST778592
- Visible remains: buildings and earthworks
- Public access: no

Hinton Priory was a Carthusian monastery in northeast Somerset, England, from 1232 until 1539.

== History ==
The priory was one of the ten medieval Carthusian houses (charterhouses) in England. It was first established at Hatherop, Gloucestershire in 1222 by William Longspee, Earl of Salisbury. The monks disliked the location, and after Longspee's death in 1226 they petitioned his countess for a new site to achieve greater solitude. She gave them her manors of Hinton and Norton St Philip in Somerset, and the new house was consecrated at a site about 0.6 miles (1 km) northeast of the village of Hinton (later called Hinton Charterhouse) in May 1232. It was called Locus Dei meaning 'God's Place'.

A "lower house" for lay brothers was established near Freshford, close to the River Frome, about 0.6 miles (1 km) to the east (grid reference ST 7884 5910). This ceased to be used, probably in the 14th century, and the lay brothers were accommodated with the main community.

Hinton gained the land and property of the small Longleat Priory in 1529.

The house was suppressed as part of the dissolution of the monasteries on 31 March 1539; at that time it housed the Prior, sixteen monks and six lay brothers. The property was then bought by Matthew Colthurst.

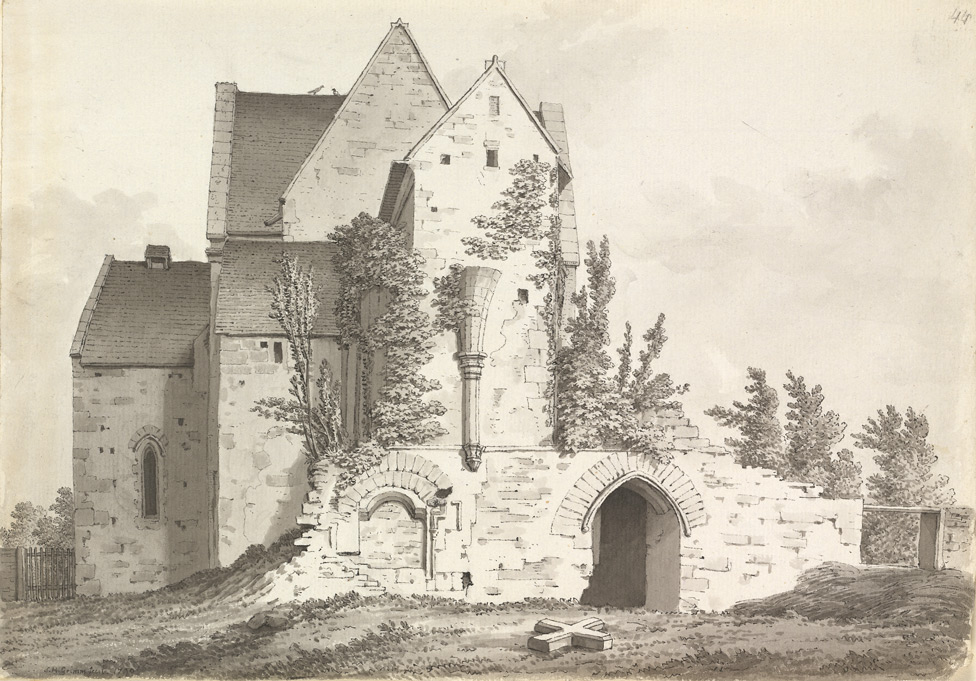
Hinton Priory Chapel drawn by Samuel Hieronymus Grimm in 1790

== Today ==
The chapter house, with library and dovecote above, survives and was designated as Grade I listed in 1956. Also standing is the refectory (also Grade I) which is part of a former stable yard (Grade II) incorporating other early work. All now belong to the sixteenth century country house, also known as Hinton Priory, on the northern part of the site and itself a Grade I listed building. Surviving earthworks from the great cloister are visible in an orchard and paddocks.

The site is a Scheduled Ancient Monument. It is included in the Heritage at Risk Register produced by English Heritage; the entry for 2012 states that its condition is "Poor" and that some parts are in need of condition assessment.

The Priory is in private ownership and there is no public access.

The site of the lower house on the River Frome is also a scheduled monument. A small current settlement there preserves the name of its predecessor in its name of "Friary". Earthworks and buried material remain, and a later cottage incorporates fragments of 14th century masonry; an interpretation board was erected by the Cotswolds Conservation Board in 2017 and indicates the layout of the mediaeval buildings.

== See also ==
- Hinton (place name)
