= Church of St Mary, Orchardleigh =

Church in Somerset, England

Church of St Mary
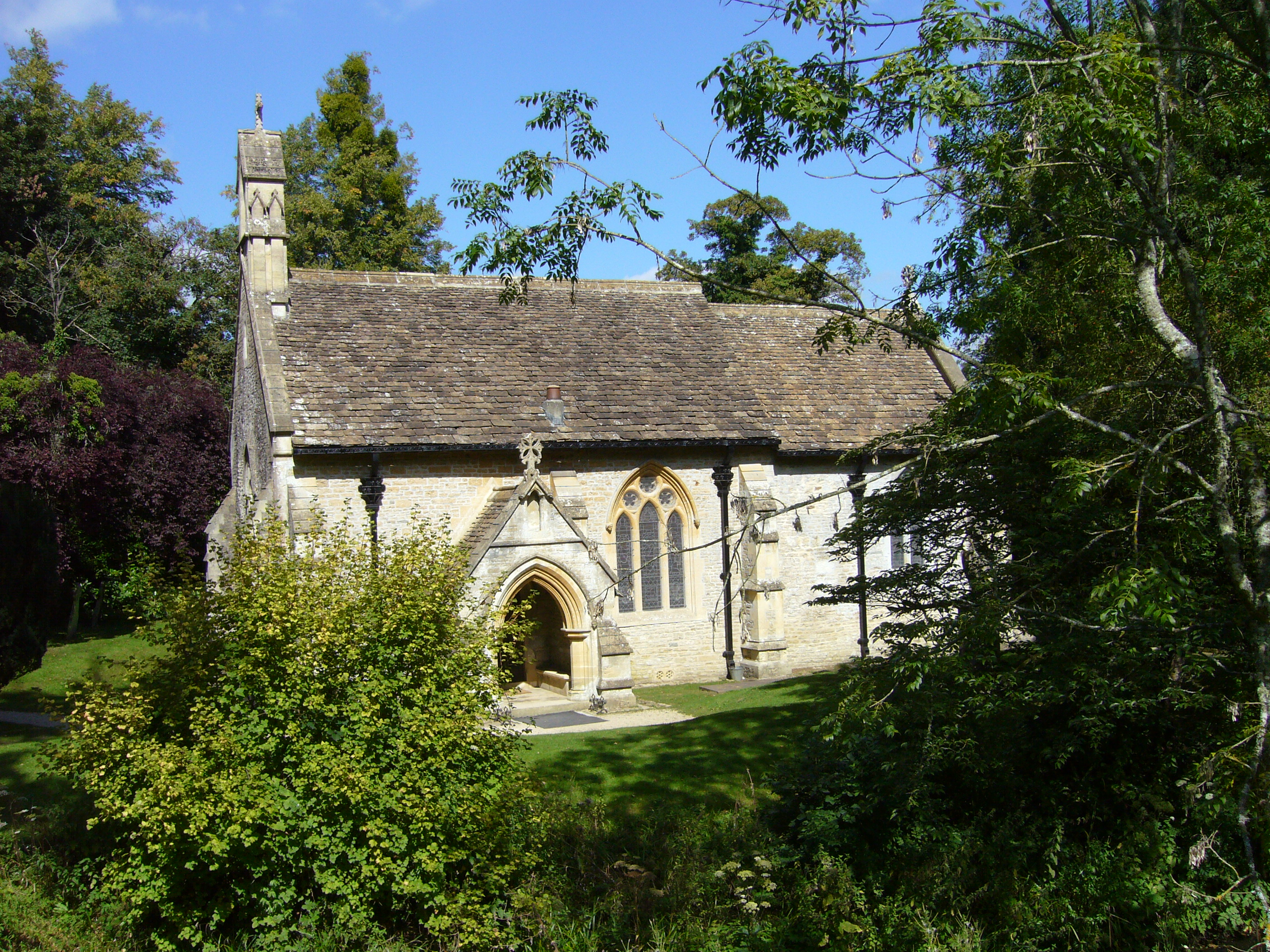

- Location within Somerset

General information
- Location: Lullington, England
- Coordinates: 51.2578°N 2.3259°W
- Completed: 13th century

The Church of St Mary is a 13th-century church in the grounds of the Orchardleigh Estate in Somerset, England.

== History ==
The church stands on an island in the 11.23-hectare (27.7-acre) artificial Orchardleigh Lake in the grounds of the Orchardleigh Estate within the parish of Lullington, Somerset. It was built in the 13th century, and was heavily restored by Sir George Gilbert Scott for the Rev. W. A. Duckworth in 1878, whose relations held the estate at that period. It has since been designated a Grade I listed building.

The church has retained its sculptures and stained glass from the 14th and 15th centuries respectively. Around 1800, estate owner Thomas Champneys of the Mostyn-Champneys Baronets had a moat dug around the church.

=== Memorials ===
The church has the grave of the poet Henry Newbolt and his wife, a member of the Duckworth family.

== Present day ==
Weddings are often performed at the church, which has capacity for 120 guests. It is reached from the mainland via a footbridge, and a public footpath runs nearby over another bridge across the lake. The church does not have an electricity supply and therefore services are candlelit. The organ is pumped by hand.

The Anglican parish is part of the benefice of Beckington with Standerwick, Berkley, Rodden and Orchardleigh within the Frome deanery.

The church was used as a filming location in 1974 for The Treasure of Abbot Thomas, a dramatisation of the M.R James ghost story produced by the BBC as part of its A Ghost Story for Christmas series.

== See also ==
- Grade I listed buildings in Mendip
- List of Somerset towers
- List of ecclesiastical parishes in the Diocese of Bath and Wells
