= Midland Bank, Poultry =

Bank headquarters by Edwin Lutyens, City of London

Midland Bank, 27-35 Poultry
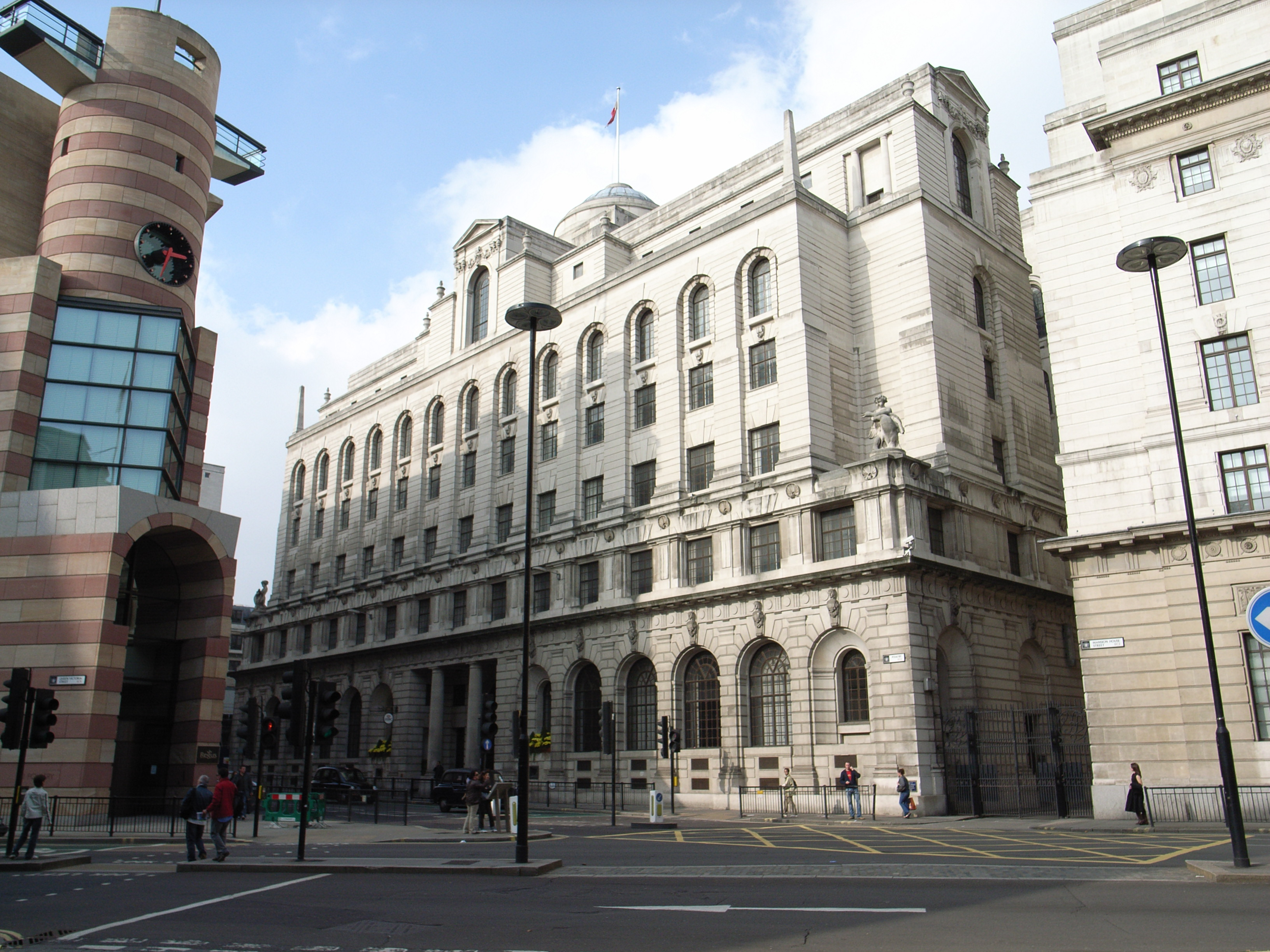
- "one of [Lutyens'] finest urban buildings"

- Location within City of London
- 51.5137°N 0.0902°W
- Type: Offices
- Location: Poultry, City of London

History
- Built: 1924-29

Site notes
- Architect: Edwin Lutyens
- Architectural style: Neoclassical
- Current use: Hotel
- Governing body: Privately owned

Listed Building – Grade I
- Official name: Midland Bank, 27-35, Poultry, EC2
- Designated: 5 June 1972
- Reference no.: 1064598

The Midland Bank, 27-35 Poultry stands on Poultry in the City of London. It was built between 1924 and 1929 as the headquarters offices of the Midland Bank. The architect was Edwin Lutyens. A Grade I listed building, its Historic England record describes it as one of Lutyens' "finest urban buildings". It is now a hotel, The Ned, named in Lutyens' honour.

== History and description ==
The Birmingham and Midland Bank was founded by Charles Geach in Birmingham in 1836. In under a century, through a long series of amalgamations, and the establishment of a successful overseas business, it had become the largest bank in the world. Renamed the Midland Bank in 1923, in 1924 it commissioned a new headquarters building on Poultry in the City of London.

The architect of the building was Edwin Lutyens. Lutyens' connection to the Midland Bank came through Reginald McKenna, a senior politician who became the bank's chairman in 1919. McKenna was married to a niece of Gertrude Jekyll, Lutyens' long-time collaborator, and Lutyens had been commissioned to design the McKenna's London townhouse, Mulberry House, in Smith Square in 1912. (Note: Mulberry House, 36 Smith Square, was subsequently bought by Henry Mond, 2nd Baron Melchett who, in conjunction with his wife, Gwen, commissioned an elaborate interior re-decoration by the architect Darcy Braddell. The result has been described as "one of the most important Art Deco interiors in London.") On McKenna's accession to the chairmanship of the Midland, he engaged Lutyens to design the bank's new headquarters. (Note: Lutyens designed much of the furniture and fittings for the new bank. A set of chairs for the directors' boardroom was placed for sale at Phillips in 2019.) The first building was completed by 1929, but Lutyens returned to undertake a major expansion between 1935 and 1937.

The building is listed at Grade I in 1971 by Historic England, which considers it one of Lutyens' "finest urban buildings".

Following the Midland's financial decline in the late 20th century, it was absorbed into HSBC in 1992. The Poultry building continued to be used by the bank until 2007 when HSBC relocated to a new headquarters in Canary Wharf in 2012. It was vacated and subsequently sold. The building was repurposed, and opened as a hotel, named "The Ned" in Lutyens' honour, in 2017. The building's restoration, a partnership between Soho House and the Sydell Hotels Group, has drawn praise from both architectural critics and travel writers.
