= Braddell =

Braddell may refer to:

== Places ==
- Braddell Bus Park, bus park in Toa Payoh, Singapore
- Braddell Heights Single Member Constituency, former constituency in Singapore
- Braddell Heights Symphony Orchestra, orchestra founded based in Singapore
- Braddell MRT station, rapid transit station located in the northern part of Toa Payoh, Singapore
- Braddell Secondary School, government secondary school in Singapore
- Braddell-Westlake Secondary School, government secondary school in Singapore

== People ==
- Darcy Braddell, pseudonym of the writer Dorothy Braddell
- Dorothy Braddell (1889–1981), British writer and designer
- Maurice Braddell, actor in the movie Men of Tomorrow
- Robert Braddell (1888–1965), English cricketer
- Thomas Braddell (1823–1891), Irish lawyer and the first Attorney-General of the British Colony of Singapore
