= Guangyang =

Guangyang may refer to:

- Guangyang District (广阳区), Langfang, Hebei, China
- Guangyang Commandery (廣陽郡), a historical region in North China
- Guangyang Secondary School (光洋中学), government secondary school in Singapore

Towns (广阳镇) in China

- Guangyang, Chongqing, in Nan'an District
- Guangyang, Fangcheng County, in Fangcheng County, Henan
- Guangyang, Tongchuan, in Yintai District, Tongchuan, Shaanxi
