= Mulberry House =

Grade II house in Westminster, London by Edwin Lutyens

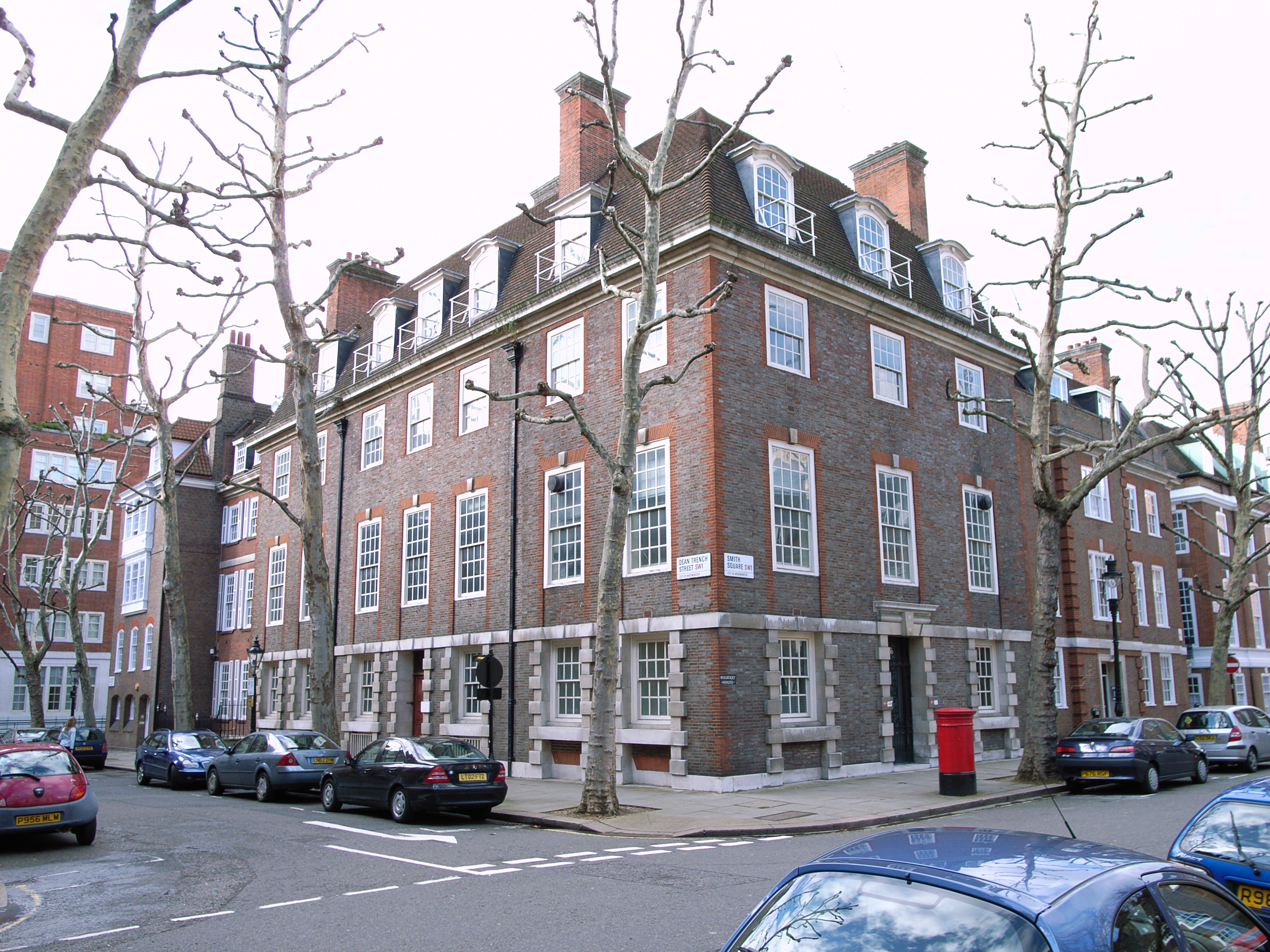
- "one of the most important Art Deco interiors in London"

- Location within City of Westminster
- 51.496°N 0.1278°W
- Type: House
- Location: Smith Square, Westminster, London

History
- Built: 1911

Site notes
- Architect: Edwin Lutyens
- Architectural style: Neoclassical
- Current use: House
- Governing body: Privately owned

Listed Building – Grade II
- Official name: 36 Smith Square, SW1
- Designated: 24 February 1958
- Reference no.: 1236248

Mulberry House, Number 36, Smith Square, is located in the City of Westminster, London. It was built in 1911 as a private house for Reginald McKenna, a politician and later Chairman of the Midland Bank. The architect was Edwin Lutyens. In 1930 the house was bought by Henry Mond, 2nd Baron Melchett. In conjunction with his wife, Gwen, Melchett employed the architect Darcy Braddell to undertake a major internal remodeling and redecoration. Braddell engaged a number of painters and sculptors, including Charles Sargeant Jagger to create what has been described as "one of the most important Art Deco interiors in London." After a period of institutional use in the post-war period, the house was reconverted to a private residence in the early 21st century.

== History ==
=== McKenna and Lutyens ===
Reginald McKenna was a Liberal politician who, by 1911, had risen to the post of First Lord of the Admiralty in the government of H. H. Asquith. He rose higher, to the post of Chancellor of the Exchequer, before resigning on the fall of Asquith's government in 1916. He never held office again, becoming Chairman of the Midland Bank in 1919, a role he held until his death in 1943. By 1910 Edwin Lutyens had established himself as one of England's leading architects of country houses. In his study of English domestic buildings, Das englische Haus, published in 1904, Hermann Muthesius had written of him, "He is a young man who has come increasingly to the forefront of domestic architects and who may soon become the accepted leader among English builders of houses". Muthesius’ prediction was fulfilled; over the course of the next twenty years Lutyens became preeminent as a designer of country houses, began the construction of New Delhi and became the foremost architect of memorials to the British dead of the First World War. (Note: Lutyens’ Cenotaph on Whitehall in London has become Britain’s national memorial. In a letter of thanks written after its unveiling, the then Prime Minister, David Lloyd George, described it as, “a national shrine, not only for the British Isles but for the whole Empire”.) The connection between Lutyens and McKenna, which continued until their deaths and saw Lutyens receive a number of further commissions, both private and public, came through McKenna's marriage to Pamela Jekyll, a niece of Gertrude Jekyll, the garden designer and Lutyens' long-time collaborator.

=== Lord and Lady Melchett ===
Mulberry House was subsequently bought by Henry Mond, 2nd Baron Melchett who, in conjunction with his wife, Gwen, commissioned an elaborate interior re-decoration by the architect Darcy Braddell. The result has been described as "one of the most important Art Deco interiors in London." The Melchetts' marriage was unconventional for its time; at their marriage, Gwen was involved with the writer Gilbert Cannan, and all three embarked on a ménage à trois which scandalised their contemporaries. The resulting outcry was the basis of Charles Sargeant Jagger's mantelpiece sculpture Scandal, and the accompanying fire basket, which decorated the drawing room at Mulberry House.

In post-war Britain, Mulberry House was converted to institutional use, in which it remained until the early 21st century. In 2005, it was reconverted to a private house, and in 2015, was put up for sale at a guide price of £25M, a price that was later reduced.

== Architecture and description ==
Mulberry House fronts onto both Smith Square and Dean Trench Street. It is of three storeys with a Mansard roof, and built in brick in Lutyens' neo-Georgian/Queen Anne style. Lawrence Weaver, whose study of 1921, Lutyens Houses and Gardens, was among the first to review Lutyens' work in an academic manner, considered that many of his Westminster townhouses, "go perilously near dullness", but praised the layout of Mulberry House. The principal interiors, particularly the drawing room and dining room, retain their 1930s forms, but most of the fittings and the mural decoration have been removed. At the time of their completion they were described as "one of the boldest, most complete and original schemes of decoration of our time". The Victoria and Albert Museum later acquired both the Jagger Scandal and the Melchett fire basket. (Note: Scandal depicts a naked couple in an intimate embrace watched by an outraged crowd. The decoration of the fire basket shows two cats snarling at each other, both hidden behind masks of young, fashionable ladies.) Mulberry House is listed at Grade II by Historic England.

== Gallery ==
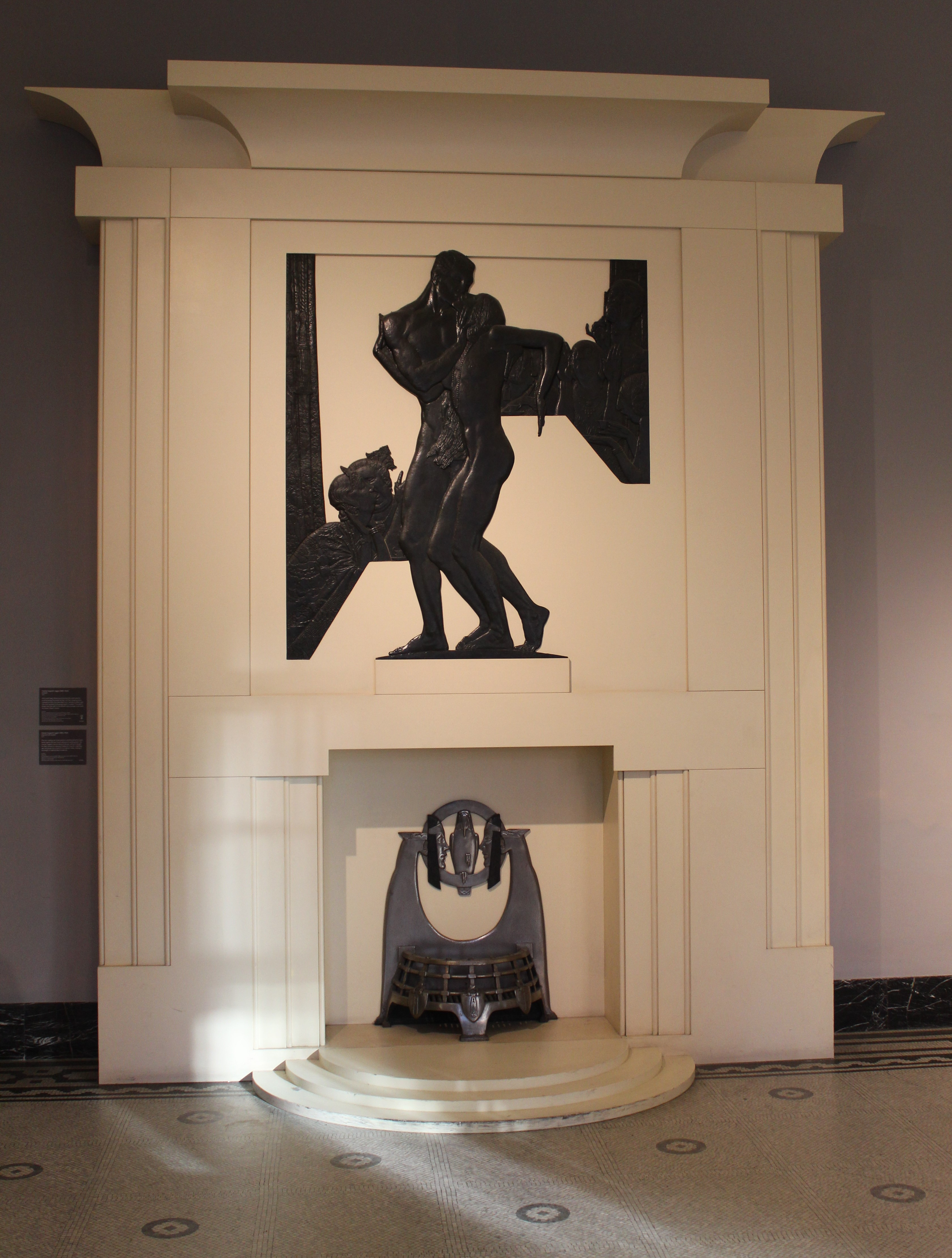
Charles Sargeant Jagger's Scandal, now at the Victoria and Albert Museum

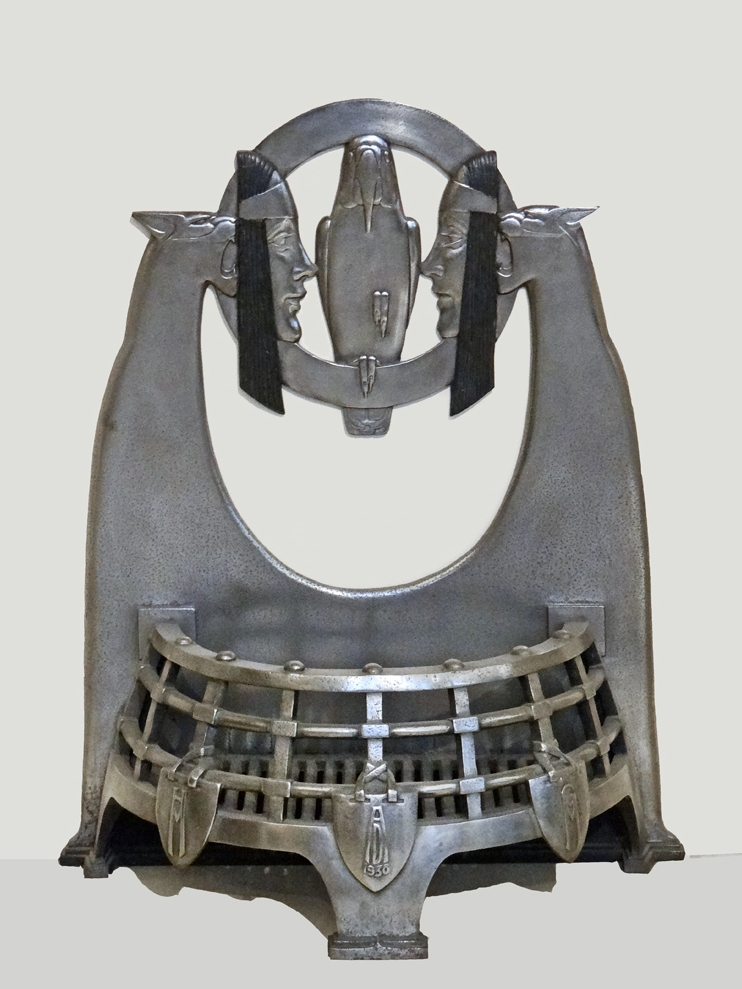
Jagger's Melchett fire basket, also at the V&A

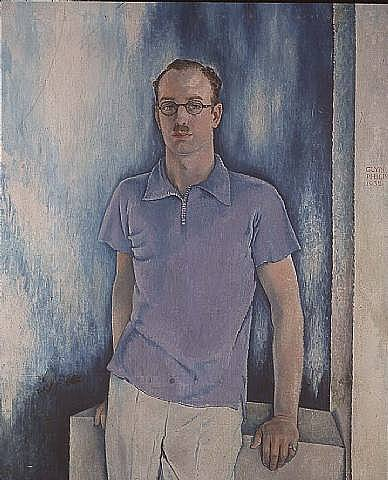
Lord Melchett by Glyn Philpot

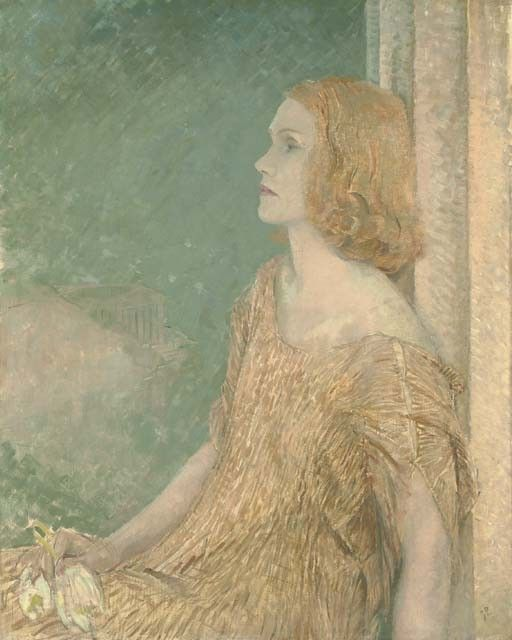
Lady Melchett, also by Philpot

== Sources ==
- Amery, Colin; Richardson, Margaret; Stamp, Gavin (1981). Lutyens: The Work of the English Architect Sir Edwin Lutyens. London: Arts Council of Great Britain. ISBN 978-0-728-70303-2.
- Hussey, Christopher (1989) [1950]. The Life of Sir Edwin Lutyens. Woodbridge: Antique Collectors Club. ISBN 978-0-907-46259-0.
- Muthesius, H. (1979) [1904]. The English House (Single volume ed.). Frogmore: Granada Publishing. ISBN 978-0-258-97101-7.
- Weaver, Lawrence (1921). Lutyens Houses and Gardens. London: Country Life. OCLC 1015756779.
