= Smith Square =

Square in the Westminster district of London, England

Coordinates: 51°29′46″N 0°7′37″W

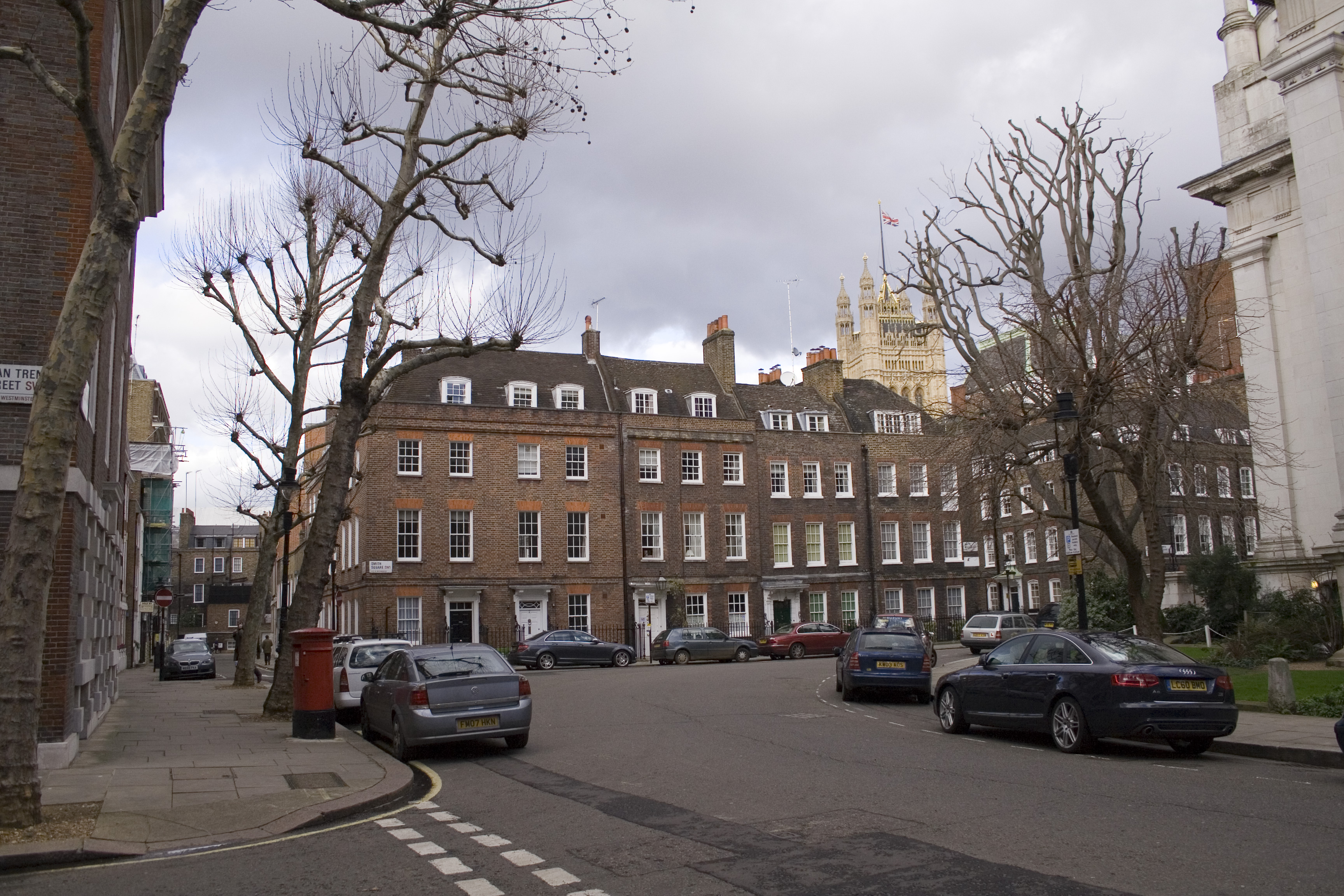
- Early Georgian north side of the square with top of Victoria Tower of the Palace of Westminster beyond

- Smith Square (City of Westminster) (local authority since 1965)
- Type: Garden square with concert hall dominating space
- Length: 275 ft (84 m)
- Width: 240 feet (73 m)
- Area: Westminster
- Location: London
- Postal code: SW1P
- Nearest metro station: Westminster tube station

Construction
- Construction start: c. 1726

Other
- Status: west end of the north side: large building: Grade I listed

Smith Square is a square in Westminster, London, 250 metres south-southwest of the Palace of Westminster. Most of its garden interior is filled by St John's, Smith Square, a Baroque surplus church, the inside of which has been converted to a concert hall. Most adjoining buildings (thus sharing its address) are offices, with the focus on organisations lobbying or serving the government. In the mid-20th century, the square hosted the headquarters of the two largest parties of British politics, and it now hosts much of the Department for Environment, Food and Rural Affairs and the Local Government Association. It has a pedestrian or mixed approach to the four sides and another approach to the north.

== History ==
The square was named after the Smith family: a family of bankers originally from Nottingham on whose land it was developed in the early eighteenth century. Its building up was arranged by Sir James Smith around 1726. №s 1 to 9, forming the north side, survive from this phase.

== Buildings ==
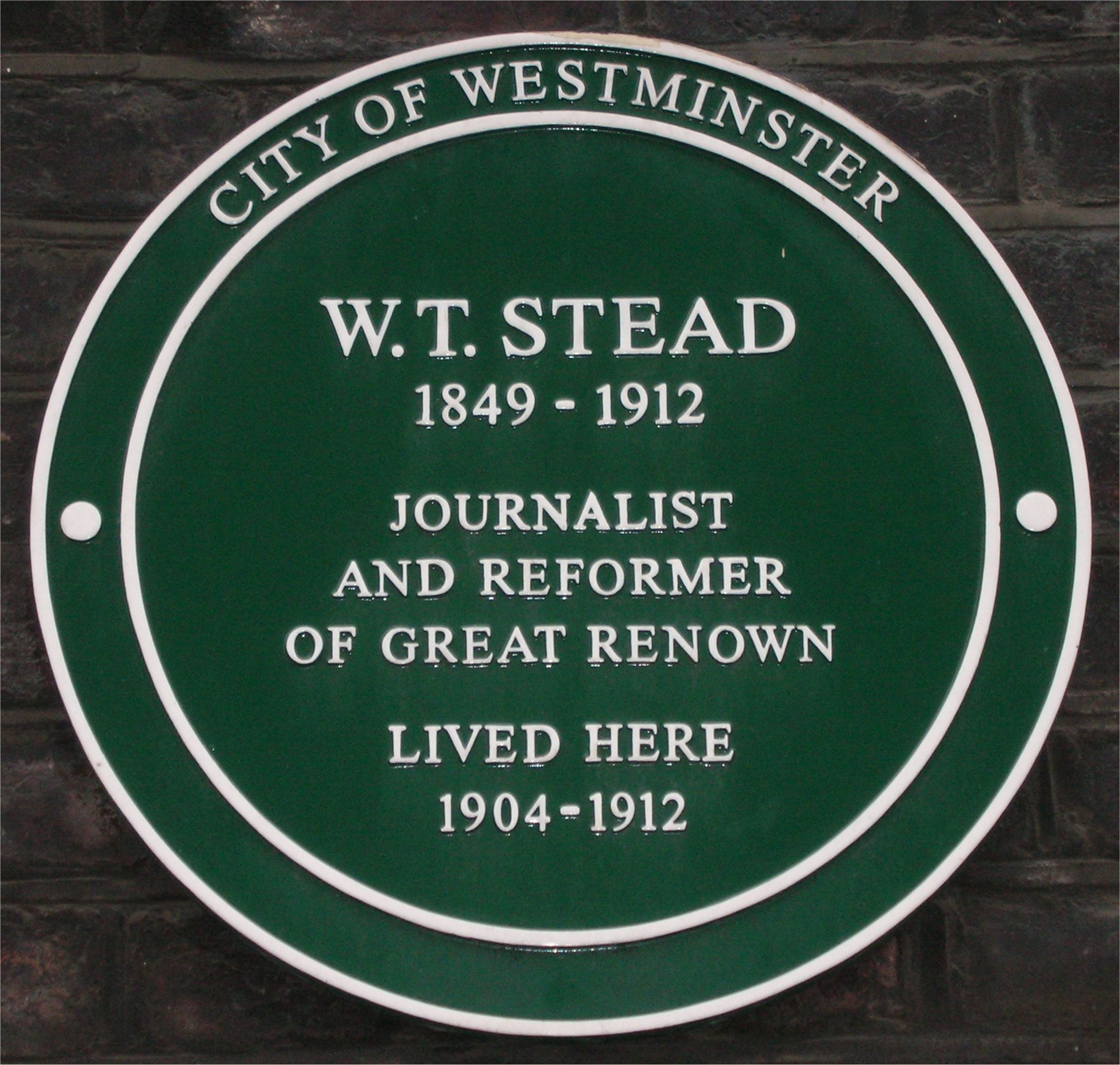
Green plaque on the Lord North Street side of № 5

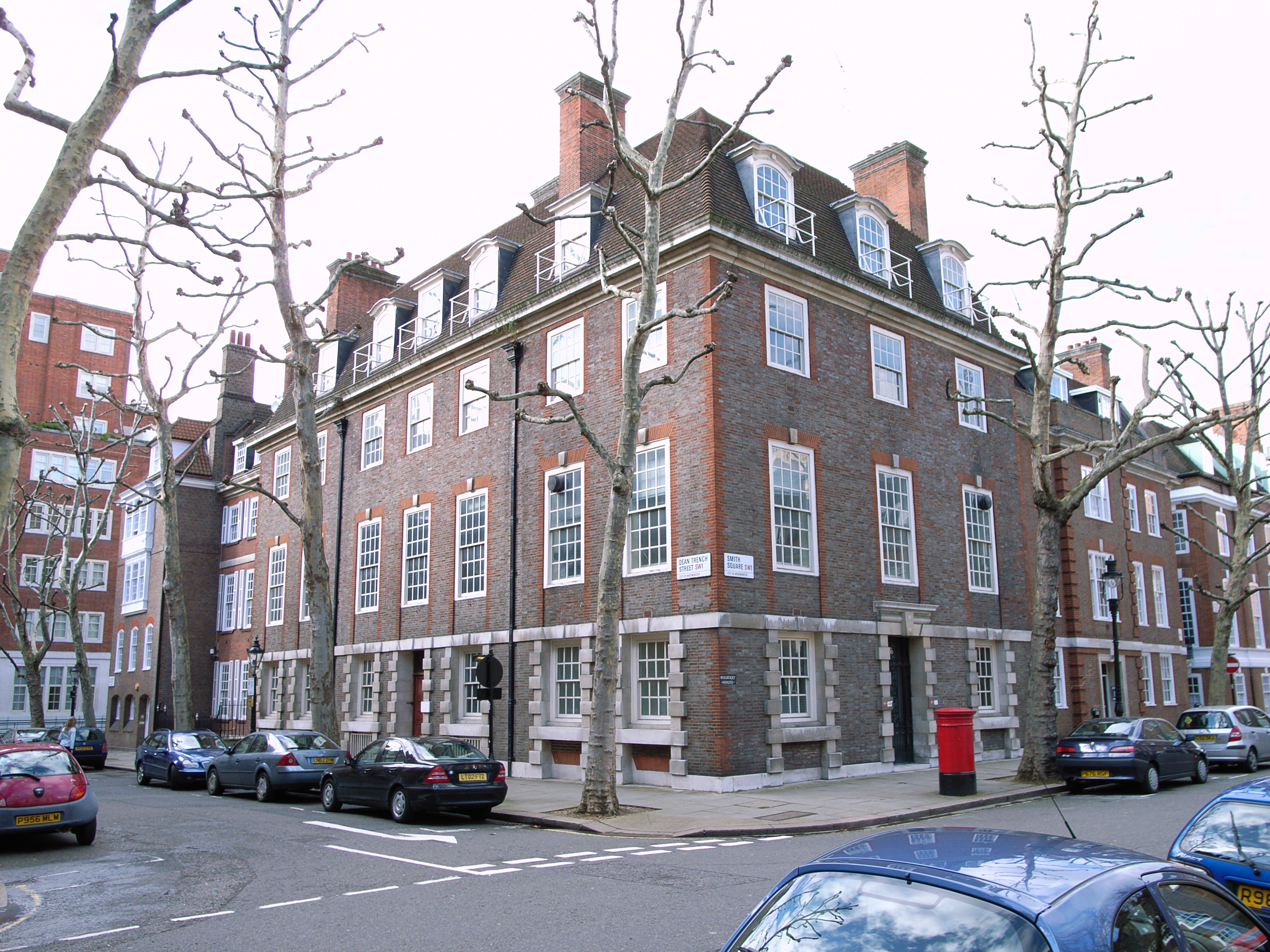
Mulberry House on № 36, former residence of Henry Mond, 2nd Baron Melchett

Sir John Smith, who was Conservative M.P. for Cities of London and Westminster from 1965 to 1970, lived at № 1. The campaigning journalist William Thomas Stead lived at № 5 from 1904 until his death on board the Titanic in 1912. Another famous resident was Rab Butler, the Conservative Deputy Prime Minister.

№ 17 - Nobel House - cross-corner block built in 1928, for newly-formed Imperial Chemical Industries (ICI). ICI leased it to the government in 1987, and it is currently headquarters for the Department for Environment, Food and Rural Affairs.

Sharing the western part of the south side is Transport House which from 1928 to 1980 head-quartered the Labour Party then the TGWU until the 1990s. It is now the headquarters of the Local Government Association and is known as Local Government House.

№s 32-34 served as Conservative Central Office, the Conservative Party's headquarters between 1958 and 2003. It stood empty until 2007 when it was sold for £30.5m to Harcourt Developments who planned to redevelop it as flats before the 2008 credit crunch hit. It is now "Europe House".

№ 36 - Mulberry House - designed by Sir Edwin Lutyens and constructed in 1911 for Reginald McKenna, a senior politician who later became chairman of the Midland Bank. It was later bought by Henry Mond, 2nd Baron Melchett who, in conjunction with his wife, Gwen, commissioned an elaborate interior re-decoration by the architect Darcy Braddell. The result has been described as "one of the most important Art Deco interiors in London." It gained notoriety for the sculpture "Scandal", designed by Charles Sargeant Jagger which is now housed in the Victoria and Albert Museum. The Grade II listed building went up for sale of £25 million in 2015.

== See also ==
- List of eponymous roads in London
- Imperial Chemical House
- Lord North Street – one of two northern approaches to Great Peter Street
- Victoria Tower Gardens – the eastern approach
