= Braddell Secondary School =

Braddell Secondary School 博道中学 Sekolah Menengah Braddell

Location
- 321, Braddell Road Singapore 579708; 1.3416°N 103.8349°E

Information
- Type: Government, Secondary
- Motto: In Word and Deed
- Established: 1985
- Closed: 2000
- Session: Single session
- School code: 3624
- Principal: Mrs Helena Song Kheng Sin(former)
- Enrolment: 0
- Colour: White Grey
- Website: link (Inactive)

Braddell Secondary School was a co-educational government secondary school in Singapore.

It started operations in 1981 and ceased to exist in 2000, when it was merged with Westlake Secondary School to form Braddell-Westlake Secondary School.

== History ==
The school was started in 1981 as a co-educational and English-medium school and it was officially opened by then-MP for Boon Teck, Michael Liew Kok Pun on 28 April 1983. It was housed in a S$6.65 million campus made out of two sunken courtyards and five blocks.

=== School motto ===
The motto "In Word and Deed" embraces the aim of the school which is the building of a caring community based on sincerity, mutual trust and respect for one another, single-mindedly working towards the betterment of the school.

=== School crest ===
The initials for the school, BS, are incorporated in the crest. The letters are stylised to form a ribbon-like B-shaped design, representing the scrolls of learning and knowledge. Leading out from the graphic symbol are the different paths a student takes to uphold the motto of "In word and deed". The yellow stands for honour and loyalty, while the blue stands for sincerity.

=== Merger with Westlake Secondary School ===
The last graduating batch as Braddellites (which the students were commonly known as) was in 1999, after which they merged with Westlake Secondary School to form Braddell-Westlake Secondary School. Braddell Secondary School's campus became Campus 1, housing upper secondary students. Braddell-Westlake Secondary School's students and teachers were transferred to Guangyang Secondary School after closing down in 2005.
