= Reginald McKenna =

British banker and Liberal politician (1863–1943)

The Right Honourable Reginald McKenna
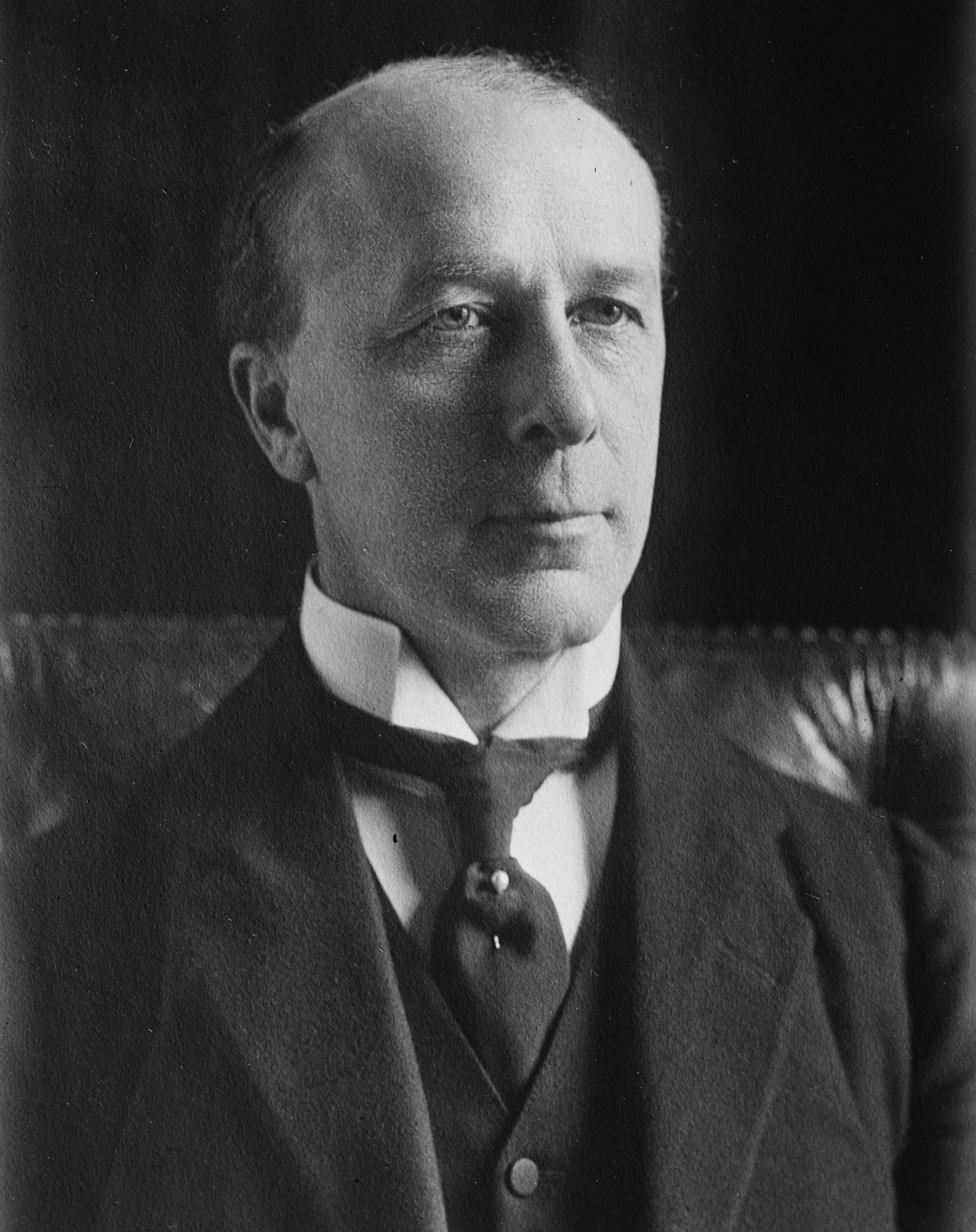

Chancellor of the Exchequer
- In office 27 May 1915 – 10 December 1916
- Monarch: George V
- Prime Minister: H. H. Asquith
- Preceded by: David Lloyd George
- Succeeded by: Bonar Law

Home Secretary
- In office 23 October 1911 – 27 May 1915
- Monarch: George V
- Prime Minister: H. H. Asquith
- Preceded by: Winston Churchill
- Succeeded by: Sir John Simon

First Lord of the Admiralty
- In office 12 April 1908 – 23 October 1911
- Prime Minister: H. H. Asquith
- Preceded by: Edward Marjoribanks
- Succeeded by: Winston Churchill

President of the Board of Education
- In office 23 January 1907 – 12 April 1908
- Prime Minister: Henry Campbell-Bannerman
- Preceded by: Augustine Birrell
- Succeeded by: Walter Runciman

Financial Secretary to the Treasury
- In office 12 December 1905 – 23 January 1907
- Prime Minister: Henry Campbell-Bannerman
- Preceded by: Victor Cavendish
- Succeeded by: Walter Runciman

Member of Parliament for North Monmouthshire
- In office 7 August 1895 – 14 December 1918
- Preceded by: Thomas Phillips Price
- Succeeded by: Constituency abolished

Personal details
- Born: 6 July 1863 Kensington, London
- Died: 6 September 1943 (aged 80) London
- Party: Liberal
- Spouse: Pamela Jekyll (d. 1943)
- Education: Trinity Hall, Cambridge

Reginald McKenna (6 July 1863 – 6 September 1943) was a British banker and Liberal politician. His first Cabinet post under Henry Campbell-Bannerman was as President of the Board of Education, after which he served as First Lord of the Admiralty. His most important roles were as Home Secretary and Chancellor of the Exchequer during the premiership of H. H. Asquith. He was studious and meticulous, noted for his attention to detail, but also for being bureaucratic and partisan.

Throughout his political career, McKenna supported numerous progressive causes such as those related to social security, housing, and working conditions.

== Background and education ==
Born in Kensington, London, McKenna was the son of William Columban McKenna and his wife Emma, daughter of Charles Hanby. Sir Joseph Neale McKenna was his uncle. McKenna was educated at King's College School and at Trinity Hall, Cambridge. At Cambridge he was a notable rower. In 1886, he was a member of the Trinity Hall Boat Club eight that won the Grand Challenge Cup at Henley Royal Regatta. He rowed bow in the winning Cambridge boat in the 1887 Boat Race. Also in 1887 he was a member of the Trinity Hall coxless four that won the Stewards' Challenge Cup at Henley.

== Political career ==
Reginald McKenna c1895

McKenna was elected at the 1895 general election as Member of Parliament (MP) for North Monmouthshire. McKenna was a Liberal Imperialist. After the Khaki Election of 1900, he favoured the return to government of former Liberal Prime Minister Lord Rosebery, although this did not happen.

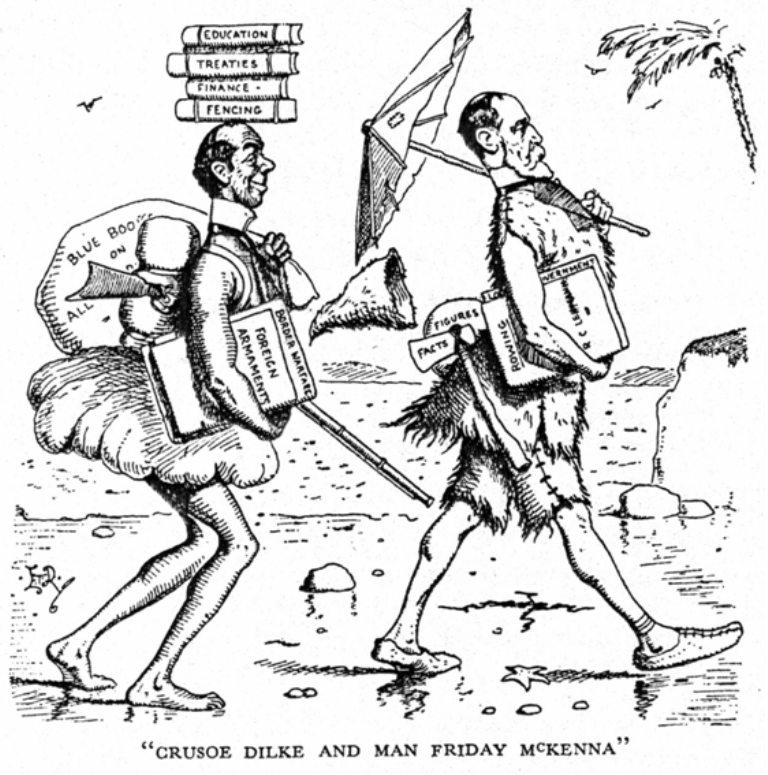
"Crusoe Dilke and Man Friday McKenna," a Punch cartoon c. 1900 depicting McKenna as a loyal servant of Sir Charles Dilke, 2nd Baronet.

In December 1905 McKenna was appointed, in preference to Winston Churchill, as Financial Secretary to the Treasury. He then served in the Liberal Cabinets of Campbell-Bannerman and Asquith as President of the Board of Education, First Lord of the Admiralty (1908–11), and Home Secretary.

He was considered methodical and efficient, but his opponents thought him priggish, prissy and lacking in charisma. McKenna's estimates were submitted to unprecedented scrutiny by the 'economists' David Lloyd George and Churchill. McKenna submitted large naval estimates in December 1908 for the financial year 1909-1910 of £36,000,000. This was the Dreadnought building programme inspired by naval reformer Admiral Fisher.

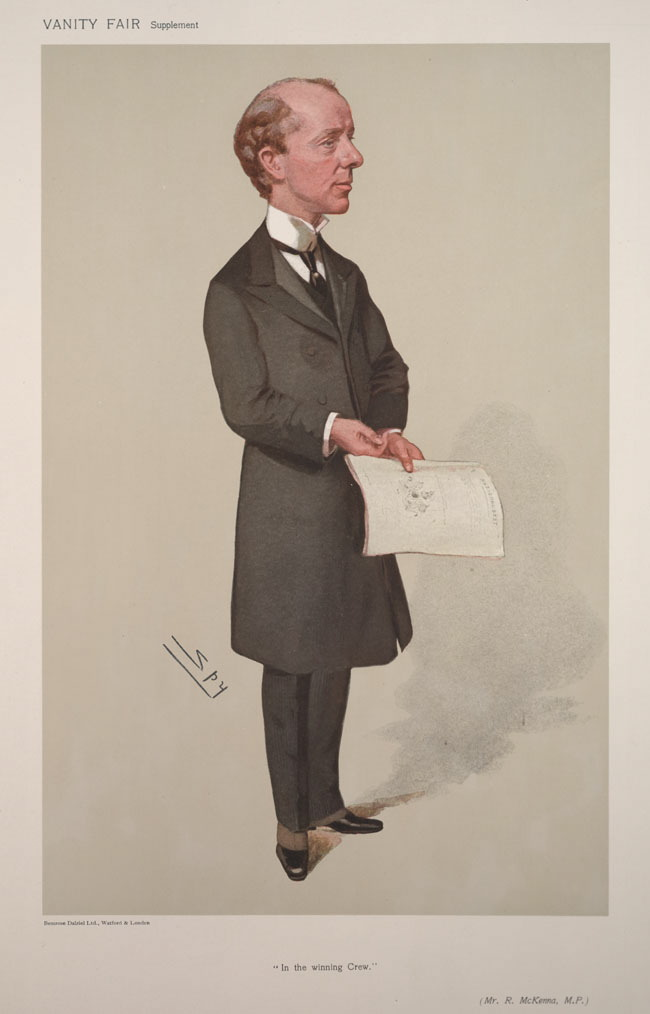
Reginald McKenna by Leslie Ward (Vanity Fair caricatures) entitled "In the winning crew"

In 1907 James Bryce was appointed Ambassador to the US, Augustine Birrell replaced him as Chief Secretary for Ireland, and McKenna succeeded Birrell as President of the Board of Education. He was responsible for such reforms as the introduction of free places in secondary schools and the bestowing upon local authorities the powers to deal with the health and physical needs of children, and was promoted to the cabinet as First Lord of the Admiralty only a year later.

=== First Lord ===
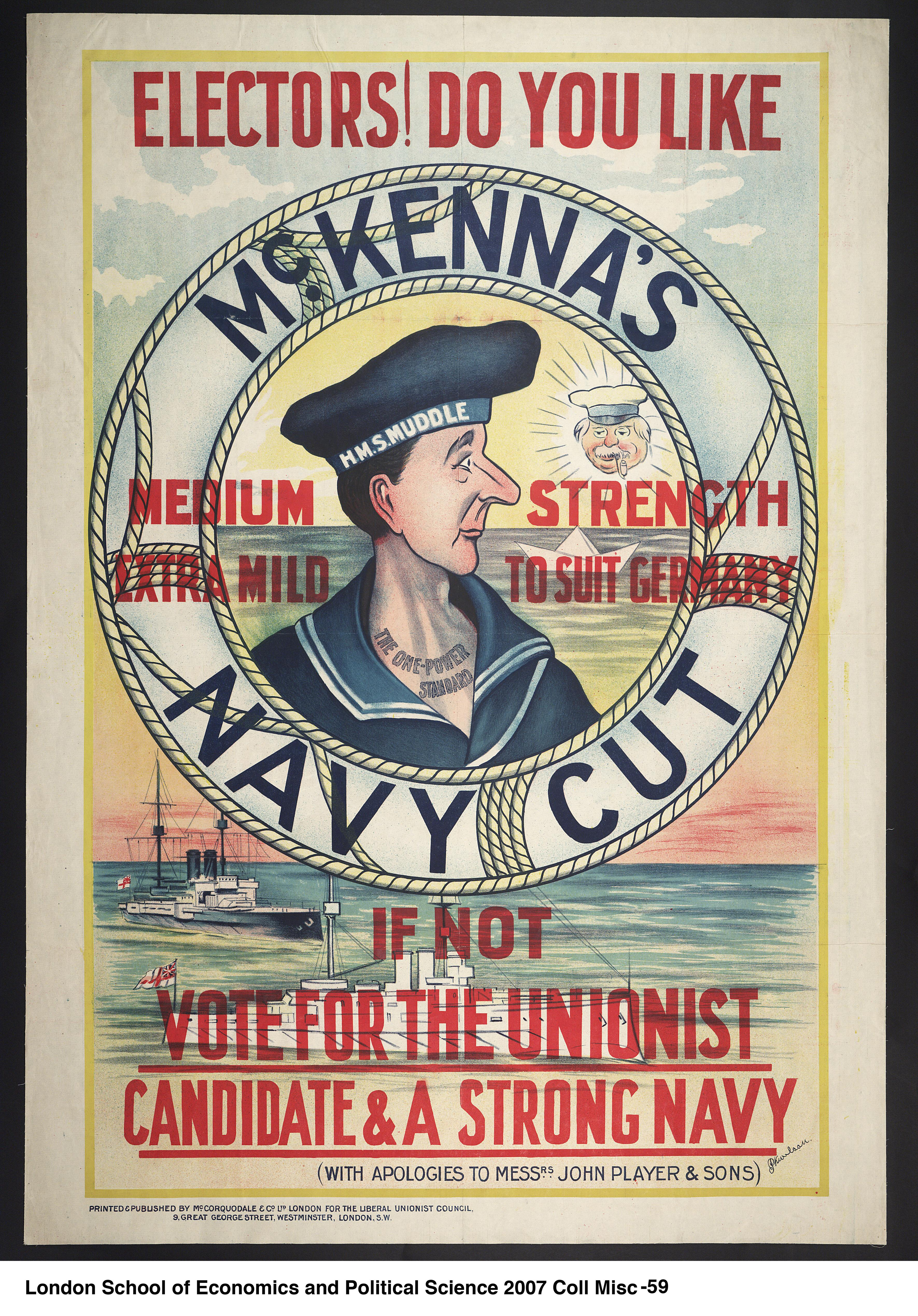
Electors! Do You Like McKenna's Navy Cut?

At the Admiralty McKenna started the Labour Exchange Bill from May 1909, a policy later associated with Churchill, in an effort to relieve unemployment. He was increasingly attacked in speeches outside Parliament. The number of Dreadnoughts to be built was increased from six to eight ships; four initially and four later. Lloyd George and Churchill had attacked McKenna's position in a plan to persuade the Liberal left of the need for defence cuts. Nonetheless McKenna was on the Cabinet finance committee that discussed Lloyd George's budget proposal of 7 March 1910, and on 12 April refused to contemplate the chancellor's proposed defence cuts.

He held his seat in the General Elections of 1910, and kept his post at the Admiralty in Asquith's government. McKenna had attended the Sub-Committee of the Committee of Imperial Defence (CID) on 17 December 1908 and 23 March 1909, during which periods he had fully comprehended the gravity of the naval threat. He also attended the famous meeting on 23 August 1911, chaired by the Prime Minister, at which Brigadier-General Wilson, over naval opposition, persuaded ministers to deploy an expeditionary force to France in the event of war. Asquith dismissed the Royal Navy's war plans as "wholly impracticable".

McKenna had little support in Cabinet, and Asquith, Richard Haldane, and Churchill wanted the latter to replace him at the Admiralty. Fortunately war was averted despite the Agadir Crisis. On 16 November McKenna accepted the Home Office, swapping jobs with Churchill.

In total McKenna had 'laid the keels' of 18 new battleships that contributed mightily to the British fleet that would fight at the Battle of Jutland in 1916. McKenna commenced the Dreadnought Arms Race: the fundamental strategic basis was for a vast fleet, large enough to intimidate Germany to decline to fight. But in the event Britain's advantage was ephemeral and fleeting.

=== Peacetime Home Secretary ===
McKenna accepted his move to the Home Office in October 1911 partly because he had recovered from an appendicitis operation. He was one of numerous Cabinet appointments at the time which, according to historian Duncan Tanner, "pushed the (Liberal) party still further to the left". McKenna and Charles Hobhouse were responsible for the Welsh Church Disestablishment Bill finally drafted on 20 February 1912. The ODNB calls him a wise and judicious Home Secretary. He was stolidly opposed by the Conservative F.E.Smith.

Another piece of legislation ensued in the Coal Mines Bill regulating pay and conditions. McKenna enthusiastically supported the minimum wage bill in principle, but partly to prevent 'civil war' in the coalfields. With Asquith's approval McKenna left a Cabinet meeting, at which he was on the majority side, to attend on the King, having left behind an "admirable memo."

Throughout the summer of 1912 he opposed the escalation of the naval race, occasioned by Churchill's plan to build a new Mediterranean fleet.

He opposed a Temperance Bill. He also made a radical proposal to let prisoners out on short licence (the Cat and Mouse Act), which he sponsored to deal with militant suffragists, a bill unanimously approved by cabinet.

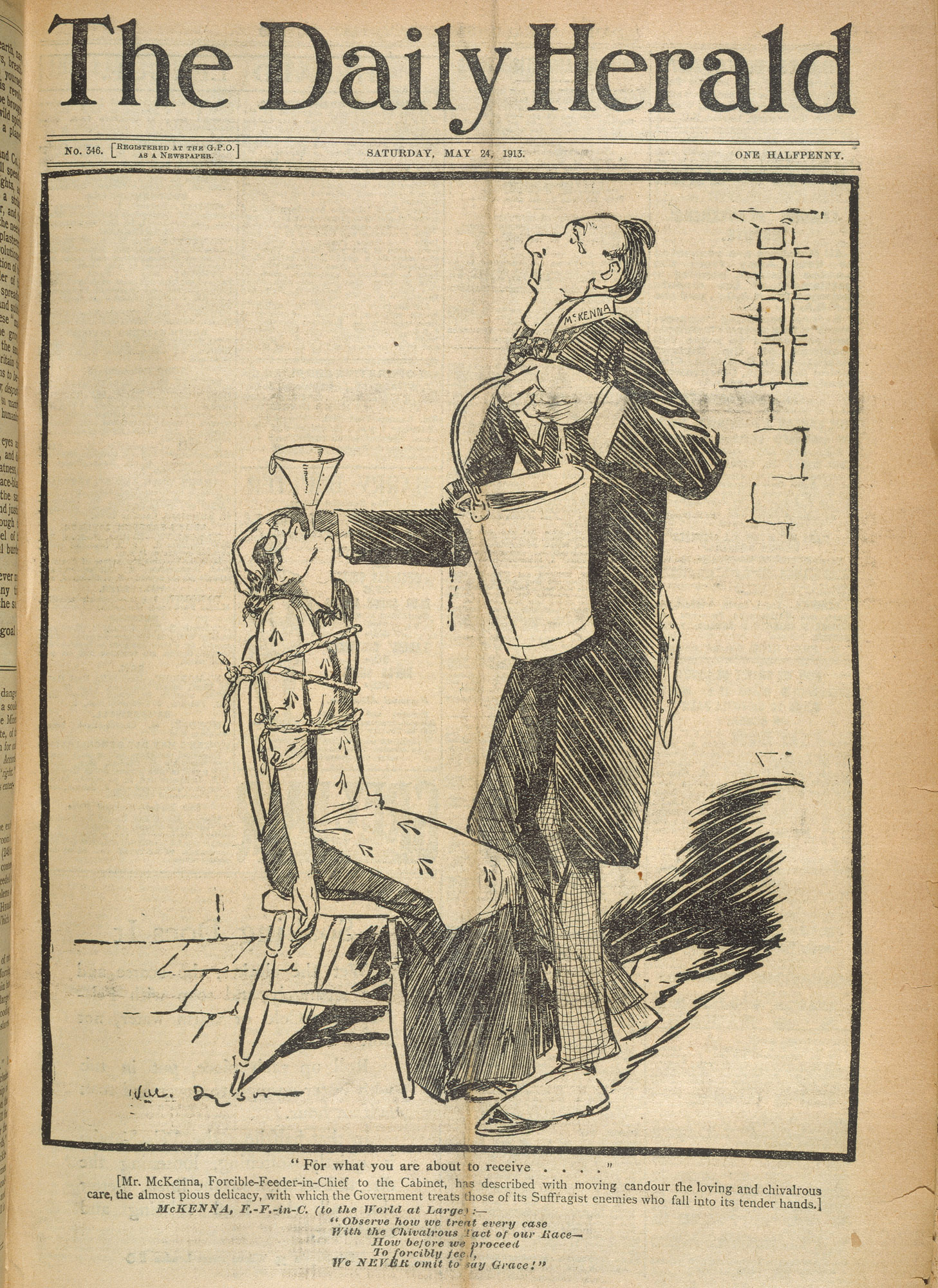
Political cartoon from 1913 depicting McKenna force feeding a nameless suffragette

On 13 March 1913 he voted against compulsory military training.

At a "council of war" with Lloyd George on 13 June, McKenna was left in no doubt that Asquith had refused the chancellor's resignation over the Marconi scandal. McKenna himself was categorical as to their innocence of the share dealings. This advice may have saved the Welsh Wizard's career. He made it clear that the Government could not secure any contracts for favours whether from Marconi or Lord Cowdray.

With Irish parentage in his own family, McKenna was happy to support the half-cash, half-stock scheme on 16 July for the Irish Purchase Act introduced by Augustine Birrell, as the prospect for Irish Home Rule drew ever nearer. Dublin was in turmoil, to McKenna and others on the Left (Walter Runciman, Charles Hobhouse, and John Burns) it was as much Edward Carson's fault as James Larkin's.

McKenna blamed Churchill for stirring up the Northcliffe press against the cabinet's plans to boost the army's budget by £800,000 and a proposed increase of £6 million in the Royal Navy's bi-annual estimate. In the new year McKenna was one of Lloyd George's group to analyse Churchill's plans for Dreadnought construction; they insisted that expenditure must be reduced to that of 1912–13.

In late January 1914 his friends Charles Hobhouse and Sir John Simon agreed to lobby the Chancellor. The following day at the Treasury their "entire sitting was taken up" by the group's tirade against Churchill's management of the Admiralty. They retired the next morning to Smith Square to discuss the Home Rule crisis in Ireland; a dissolution "would be a complete practical triumph for the Tory Party", wrote Hobhouse; their group was expanded to include Beauchamp and Runciman. On 29 January the group sent a petition to Asquith protesting against the Naval Estimates, now assumed to total £52.5 million.

McKenna had been receiving messages of grave concern from Irish leader John Redmond. On 17 July, before the weekend, McKenna proposed an Amending Bill to the Government of Ireland Bill to allow any Ulster county to opt out of Home Rule.

=== Wartime Home Secretary ===
The problems of Ireland paled into insignificance in early August. Broadly-speaking McKenna, an Asquithian, supported the pledge to go to war to defend Belgium's neutrality, but he did not want to send the British Expeditionary Force (BEF). Charles Masterman, Runciman and McKenna all wanted to stall the Kaiser for invaluable time. Most of the cabinet opposed armed intervention in France, almost up until the declaration of war.

The Home Secretary remained in charge of State Security: more than 6,000 espionage cases were investigated, none of which produced any traitors. The smuggling of German arms during the Irish Home Rule Crisis had sparked fears that Britain was infiltrated by a network of spies. In response cable telegraphs were laid from Dartmouth to Brest in Brittany to guarantee Allied communications links. On 20 October a warrant went out for the arrest of 23,000 Germanic aliens, and food supplies to Belgium were cut lest they fell into German hands. McKenna refused to allow the publication of the sinking of HMS Audacious; in the event it was 'leaked' to The Evening News anyway. And on 30 October the Cabinet announced a general policy of censorship. In the Wilhelmina case he again referred to the legal situation, seeking a solution in international law.

McKenna disliked the autocratic and dismissive Lord Kitchener, appointed Secretary of State for War at the start of the war. Immediately on his appointment their relations soured: the policy of voluntary recruitment continued as the Army needed one million men, until the Adjutant-General complained there were too many new recruits. On 5 March 1915 McKenna reported that the Ritz Carlton Hotel, New York was being used as a spy network to inform on British intelligence; the government, determined to prevent the USA entering the war on Germany's side, informed Washington. McKenna supported Asquith and gradually fell out with Lloyd George.

Internal wrangling in Cabinet conversations reached fever pitch: Edwin Montagu, a cousin of Herbert Samuel and ally of Lloyd George suggested that Asquith was jealous of Sir Edward Grey's prowess in the Foreign Office. When in April 1915 the Home Secretary banned Montagu from his home for six months, the scene was set for a final split in the party. McKenna was a Teetotaller, something he had impressed upon the King was necessary for good government. His Majesty "took the pledge" for the duration of the war, an example which Lord Chancellor Haldane felt he had to follow for the remainder of his time in office.

=== Asquith's Liberal Chancellor ===
In May 1915 Asquith formed a coalition government. McKenna, a reluctant coalitionist, became Chancellor of the Exchequer. In the meantime, McKenna oversaw the issue of the Second War Loan in June 1915, at an interest rate of 4.5%, although his first budget was actually on 21 September 1915 was a serious attempt to deal with an impending debt crisis. Revenues were rising, but not by enough to cover the £1.6 billion government expenditure. McKenna increased income tax rates and introduced a 50% excess profit tax, and increases in indirect taxation of goods such as tea, coffee, and tobacco. Post Office charge increases could not be included in the Budget (as they would have endangered its status as a money bill), and were instead introduced in a Post Office and Telegraph Bill.

=== McKenna duties ===
In September 1915, he introduced a 33 1/3% levy on luxury imports in order to fund the war effort. At first this excluded commercial vehicles, which were needed for war transportation. The tax, which became known as the "McKenna Duties", was intended to be temporary but lasted for 41 years until it was finally axed in 1956. It was briefly waived between August 1924 and June 1925, and then extended on 1 May 1926 to cover commercial vehicles.

=== Fiscal relations and Lloyd George ===
The April 1916 budget saw further large rises in income and excess profit taxes, at a time when prices of basic food commodities were rising. Sales taxes were extended to rail tickets, mineral water, cider and perry, and entertainments. The government pledged that if they issued War Loan at the even higher interest (as they did with the 5% issue of 1917), holders of the 4.5% bonds might also convert to the new rate. His predecessor David Lloyd George criticised McKenna in his memoirs for increasing the interest rate from 3.5% on the 1914 War Loan at a time when investors had few alternatives and might even have had their capital "conscripted" by the government. Not only did the change ultimately increase the nation's interest payments by £100 million/year but it meant rates were higher throughout the economy during the post-war depression. Compared with France, the British government relied more on short-term financing in the form of treasury bills and exchequer bonds during World War I; Treasury bills provided the bulk of British government funds in 1916. McKenna fell out with Lord Cunliffe, Governor of the Bank of England. Furthermore, he tried to sequestrate the assets of the US Prudential Assurance Company to pay for American war materiel purchases.

An opponent of Lloyd George, McKenna was critical of the Prime Minister's political approach, telling Conservative politician Arthur Balfour that "you disagree with us, but you can understand our principles. Lloyd George doesn't understand them and we can't make him". But unlike McKenna, Lloyd George had no problem with relations with Cunliffe.

McKenna nevertheless saw the state as having an important role in society, a sentiment that he shared with Asquith. As noted by his biographer and nephew, Stephen McKenna,

Without trying to define the whole duty of Liberal man, Asquith and McKenna were at one in seeing that if certain services were not undertaken by the state, they would not be undertaken at all. Old age pensions were a case in point. They had not been dangled as an electioneering bait; Asquith made no appeal to sentiment or emotion when the Cabinet committee of investigation was set up, but from their first days together at the Treasury he and McKenna had agreed that, if the money could be found, this was a matter on which a beginning must be made forthwith.

=== Conscription ===
The issue of enforced service in the armed forces was controversial in Britain. The Conservatives were almost entirely in favour, but the Liberals were split, with Asquithians largely opposed on libertarian grounds, whilst Lloyd George united with the Tories in what he declared to be a vital national interest. Sir John Simon, Liberal Home Secretary and an ally of McKenna, resigned over the conscription of bachelors in January 1916. As Chancellor of Exchequer McKenna objected to the conscription of married men in May 1916 on purely economic grounds, arguing that it would 'deplete' Britain's war industries. McKenna knew that for Asquith to remain in office he had to move towards conscription, whether he liked it or not; if he did not, the Tories would topple the government.

At a decisive meeting on 4 December 1916 McKenna tried to persuade Asquith to sack Lloyd George to save the government. McKenna retired into opposition upon the fall of Asquith at the end of 1916.

=== Chairman of the Midland Bank ===
McKenna's seat of North Monmouthshire was abolished by boundary changes so at the 1918 general election he stood and was defeated for the new seat of Pontypool, covering much of the same area. He became a non-executive member of the board of the Midland Bank at the invitation of the chairman, Liberal MP Sir Edward Holden. Before Holden died in 1919, McKenna had sat in his office every day to observe the activities of a chairman. An elaborate coda was drafted to allow the bank's directors to determine whether he should resign his Pontypool seat where he was presently the Liberal candidate (his previous seat of North Monmouthshire had disappeared in boundary changes). But the situation did not arise as he was not elected in 1922. The new Prime Minister Bonar Law hoped to persuade him to come out of retirement and serve once again at the Exchequer in a Conservative Cabinet, but he refused, and remained in private life. His refusal was partly because he wanted to promote an alliance between Bonar Law and Asquith, who was still official leader of the Liberal Party. The following year Bonar Law's successor Stanley Baldwin repeated the request and McKenna was more agreeable, but again declined.

McKenna used his status as chairman of one of the big five British banks to argue that monetary policy could be used to achieve domestic macroeconomic objectives. At the Chamberlain-Bradbury committee he questioned whether a return to the gold standard was desirable. John Maynard Keynes was the only other witness to do so, although others proposed a delayed return.

=== Possible return to government ===
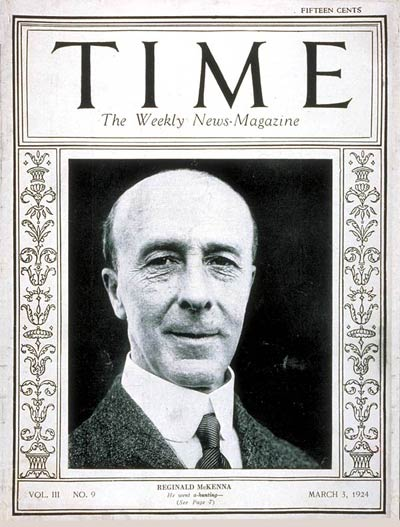
Time Cover, 3 Mar 1924

According to Lord Birkenhead, Lloyd George's Liberals were of poor intellect, with no great leaders to take the government onwards. McKenna was certainly a technocrat but did not want to be Prime Minister although he might conceivably have been offered the post. In reality, the Conservatives wanted one of their own. However, he wished to enter Parliament in July 1923 as MP for the City of London, and neither of the incumbent MPs would agree to vacate in order to make room. As a result, McKenna declined, as he had no wish to vacate the bank. McKenna continued to write economic reports for Whitehall and Westminster, but by August 1923, his political career had come to an end.

The lasting impression was one of the pin-striped merchant banker, a model of precision but not a clubbable leader of men; his absence from London society and Brooks's seemed to imply retirement. However, his financial reputation was such as to prompt Stanley Baldwin to demand his return to government in the 1930s. As late as 1939, it was proposed that he should be brought back to replace Liberal National Chancellor Sir John Simon. McKenna was the last of the Asquithians to die, in 1943.

== Family ==
McKenna was married in 1908 to Pamela Jekyll (who died November 1943), younger daughter of Sir Herbert Jekyll (brother of landscape gardener Gertrude Jekyll) and his wife Dame Agnes Jekyll, née Graham. They had two sons – Michael (died 1931) and David, who married Lady Cecilia Elizabeth Keppel (12 April 1910 – 16 June 2003), a daughter of Walter Keppel, 9th Earl of Albemarle in 1934. McKenna was a talented financier, and a champion bridge player in his free time. In royal company at Balmoral McKenna played golf.

Reginald McKenna died in London on 6 September 1943, and was buried at St Andrew's Church in Mells, Somerset. His wife died two months later, and is buried beside him. McKenna was a regular client of Sir Edwin Lutyens who designed the Midland Bank headquarters in Poultry, London, and several branches. Pamela McKenna was a high society hostess whose dinner parties charmed Asquith at their Lutyens-built townhouse, Mulberry House in Smith Square. Lutyens the unofficial imperial-government architect built several homes for McKenna, and the political classes, as well as his grave. Lutyens was commissioned to build Mulberry House, 36 Smith Square in 1911, followed by Park House in Mells Park, Somerset, built in 1925. The owners of Mells Park were Sir John Horner and his wife Frances, née Graham, who was Agnes Jekyll's sister, and they agreed to let the park to McKenna for a nominal rent, on the understanding that he would rebuild the house. Lutyens built a final house for McKenna at Halnaker Park, in Halnaker, Sussex, in 1938. Lutyens designed the McKenna family tomb in St Andrew's Church, Mells, in 1932.

His nephew Stephen McKenna was a popular novelist who published a biography of his uncle in 1948.

== Publications ==
- (1928) Post-War Banking Policy: A Series of Addresses London: William Heinemann.

== See also ==
- List of Cambridge University Boat Race crews
- Liberal Government 1905-15

Parliament of the United Kingdom
Preceded by Thomas Phillips Price	Member of Parliament for North Monmouthshire; 1895–1918	Constituency abolished
Political offices
Preceded by Victor Cavendish	Financial Secretary to the Treasury; 1905–1907	Succeeded by Walter Runciman
Preceded by Augustine Birrell	President of the Board of Education; 1907–1908	Succeeded by Walter Runciman
Preceded by The Lord Tweedmouth	First Lord of the Admiralty; 1908–1911	Succeeded by Winston Churchill
Preceded by Winston Churchill	Home Secretary; 1911–1915	Succeeded by Sir John Simon
Preceded by David Lloyd George	Chancellor of the Exchequer; 1915–1916	Succeeded by Bonar Law
Awards and achievements
Preceded by Bernard M. Baruch	Cover of Time Magazine; 3 March 1924	Succeeded by Warren S. Stone
