= North Monmouthshire (UK Parliament constituency) =

UK Parliament constituency (1885–1918)

Northern Monmouthshire
- Former county constituency for the House of Commons

1885–1918
- Seats: one
- Created from: Monmouthshire
- Replaced by: Monmouth and Pontypool

Northern Monmouthshire was a parliamentary constituency in Monmouthshire, Wales. It returned one Member of Parliament (MP) to the House of Commons of the Parliament of the United Kingdom.

== History ==
The constituency was created by the Redistribution of Seats Act 1885 for the 1885 general election. It was abolished for the 1918 general election.

== Boundaries ==
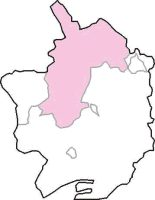
The constituency (shown in pink) within Monmouthshire

The constituency comprised the Petty Sessional Divisions of:

- Abergavenny (The civil parishes of Abergavenny, Abergavenny Rural, Bwlch-Trewyn, Cwmyoy Upper, Cwmyoy Lower, Llanellen, Llanfoist, Llangattock, Llingoed, Llangattock-nigh-Usk, Llanover Lower, Llansaintffraed, Llanthewy-Rytherch, Llanthewy-Skirrid, Llantillio-Pertholey, Llanvapley, Llanvetherine, Llanvihangel-Crucorney, Llanvihangel-nigh-Usk, Llanwenarth Citra, Llanwenarth Ultra and Oldcastle)
- Pontypool (Abersychan, Blaenavon, Glascoed, Goytre, Llanvair Kilgedin, Llanhilleth, Llanvihangel-Pontymoile, Llanfrechfa (Upper), Mamhilad, Panteg, Pontypool and Trevethin)
- and Skenfrith (Grosmont, Llangattock Vibon Avel, Llangua, Llantilio Crossenny, Llanvihangel-Ystern-Llewern and St Maughans, Skenfrith)

On abolition by the Representation of the People Act 1918, the area of the constituency was included in the Monmouth and Pontypool constituencies.

== Members of Parliament ==
Election	Member	Party
1885	Thomas Phillips Price	Liberal
1895	Reginald McKenna	Liberal
1918	constituency abolished	

== Election results ==
=== Elections in the 1880s ===
General election 1885: North Monmouthshire
Party	Candidate	Votes	%	±%
Liberal	Thomas Price	5,693	63.8	
Conservative	John Rolls	3,236	36.2	
Majority		2,457	27.6	
Turnout		8,929	83.4	
Registered electors		10,705		
Liberal win (new seat)				

General election 1886: North Monmouthshire
Party	Candidate	Votes	%	±%
Liberal	Thomas Price	4,688	58.8	−5.0
Conservative	Edward Jones	3,285	41.2	+5.0
Majority		1,403	17.6	−10.0
Turnout		7,973	74.5	−8.9
Registered electors		10,705		
Liberal hold		Swing	−5.0	

=== Elections in the 1890s ===
General election 1892: North Monmouthshire
Party	Candidate	Votes	%	±%
Liberal	Thomas Price	5,020	56.5	−2.3
Conservative	John Rolls	3,863	43.5	+2.3
Majority		1,157	13.0	−4.6
Turnout		8,883	73.2	−1.3
Registered electors		12,130		
Liberal hold		Swing	−2.3	

General election 1895: North Monmouthshire
Party	Candidate	Votes	%	±%
Liberal	Reginald McKenna	4,965	54.2	−2.3
Conservative	Ellis Hume-Williams	4,203	45.8	+2.3
Majority		762	8.4	−4.6
Turnout		9,168	78.5	+5.3
Registered electors		11,674		
Liberal hold		Swing	−2.3	

=== Elections in the 1900s ===
McKenna

General election 1900: North Monmouthshire
Party	Candidate	Votes	%	±%
Liberal	Reginald McKenna	5,139	57.9	+3.7
Conservative	De Fonblanque Pennefather	3,740	42.1	−3.7
Majority		1,399	15.8	+7.4
Turnout		8,879	79.6	+1.1
Registered electors		11,159		
Liberal hold		Swing	+3.7	

General election 1906: North Monmouthshire
Party	Candidate	Votes	%	±%
Liberal	Reginald McKenna	7,730	71.0	+13.1
Conservative	Charles Campbell	3,155	29.0	−13.1
Majority		4,575	42.0	+26.2
Turnout		10,885	81.2	+1.6
Registered electors		13,411		
Liberal hold		Swing	+13.1	

By-election, 1907: West Monmouthshire
Party	Candidate	Votes	%	±%
Liberal	Reginald McKenna	Unopposed		
Liberal hold				

=== Elections in the 1910s ===
General election January 1910: North Monmouthshire
Party	Candidate	Votes	%	±%
Liberal	Reginald McKenna	8,596	66.5	−4.5
Conservative	Evelyn Carmichael	4,335	33.5	+4.5
Majority		4,261	33.0	−9.0
Turnout		12,931	82.3	+1.1
Registered electors		15,711		
Liberal hold		Swing	−4.5	

General election December 1910: North Monmouthshire
Party	Candidate	Votes	%	±%
Liberal	Reginald McKenna	7,722	62.7	−3.8
Conservative	David Ellis Williams	4,586	37.3	+3.8
Majority		3,136	25.4	−7.6
Turnout		12,308	78.3	−4.0
Registered electors		15,711		
Liberal hold		Swing	−3.8	

General Election 1914–15:

Another General Election was required to take place before the end of 1915. The political parties had been making preparations for an election to take place and by July 1914, the following candidates had been selected;

- Liberal: Reginald McKenna
- Unionist: David Ellis Williams
- Labour: James Winstone

== Sources ==
- Leigh Rayment's Historical List of MPs – Constituencies beginning with "M" (part 3)
