= Thomas Phillips Price =

Welsh landowner, mine owner, and politician (1844–1932)

Member of Parliament for North Monmouthshire
- In office 1885–1895

Personal details
- Born: 14 June 1844
- Died: 28 June 1932 (aged 88)
- Party: Liberal

Thomas Phillips Price (14 June 1844 – 28 June 1932) was a Welsh landowner, mine owner, and Liberal politician.

== Early life ==
Price was the son of the Reverend Canon William Price, vicar of Llanarth. He was educated at Highgate School from 1854 until December 1858, when he went to Winchester College, and at University College, Oxford (B.A. 1867, M.A. 1868).

When he was 23, his unmarried uncle, Sir Thomas Phillips left him a fortune. He was an active mine owner with a mine at Darran Llanhilleth, and in 1863 he sunk a mineshaft at Ebbw Fach.

== Career ==
In 1885, Price was elected as MP for North Monmouthshire and held the seat for 10 years. In 1882, he was appointed High Sheriff of Monmouthshire. He was a captain in the Monmouthshire Militia and a JP, living at Triley Court Abergavenny.

He also rented Skreens Park, a large mansion near Chelmsford which is now demolished. After losing his Parliamentary seat in 1895 he became a county councillor and Justice of the Peace for Essex. In 1898, he purchased Marks Hall with a fine mansion and deer park. Later he purchased the Villa Capponi, a fine 15th-century villa just outside Florence. His second wife suffered ill-health and they spent a large part of the year there.

In 1907, in consultation with Sir George Murray of the Treasury and Sir David Prain, director of Kew Gardens, he made provision in his will to leave the Marks Hall estate to the nation in the interest of agriculture, arboriculture and forestry. During the Second World War, Earls Colne Airfield was built on the edge of the deer park, and much of the property was requisitioned. By 1949, the mansion was said to be in a dangerous state and it was demolished in 1950.

== Family ==
Price married Frances Anne Rowlett in 1882. She died in 1897 and he married again to Florence Cecilia Konstamm, who had an Italian mother and a brother, Max Konstamm, who was a King's Councillor. Florence died in 1926 and in 1927 Price married for the third time to Mary Elizabeth Swann, his sister's companion who was then 51 to his 83.

Price died on 28 June 1932, aged 87.

Parliament of the United Kingdom
New constituency	Member of Parliament for North Monmouthshire; 1885–1895	Succeeded by Reginald McKenna
