= Braddell-Westlake Secondary School =

Braddell-Westlake Secondary School 德礼中学 Sekolah Menengah Braddell-Westlake

Location
- Coordinates: 1.343302°N 103.840915°E

Information
- Type: Government; Secondary
- Motto: In Word and Deed, With Purpose and Determination
- Established: 2000
- Closed: 2005
- Session: Single session
- School code: 3624
- Principal: Mrs Catherine Seah (last)
- Colours: Blue and Yellow
- Website: link (Inactive)

Braddell-Westlake Secondary School was a former government secondary school located in the area of Braddell, Singapore.

== History ==
Braddell-Westlake Secondary School was formed from a merger between Braddell Secondary School and Westlake Secondary School in 2000 in order to boost falling enrollment in both separate schools.

Located along Braddell Road, it occupied the former premises of its two component schools and had the distinction of being one of the few secondary schools in Singapore to occupy two separate campuses. This created obvious benefits to the students, who then had the facilities of two schools at their disposal, such as two canteens, two assembly-halls and a large combined school-field. Ms Monica Quek was the school's principal from 2000 to 2003 before retiring, after which Mrs Catherine Seah replaced her and served as the principal until the school's closure in 2005.

Initially, the lower-secondary section (Sec' 1 to 2) was housed in Campus 1 (at the former Braddell Secondary School) and the upper-secondary section (Sec' 3 to 5) was situated at Campus 2 (at the former Westlake Secondary School). Nearer towards the eventual closure of the school, Campus 1 was closed down and all remaining classes and both sections shifted entirely to Campus 2. Although the yearly enrollment of the school typically fell short of 1000 students, this caused a close-knit community of students to be formed in a cosy and relatively quaint atmosphere.

After being abandoned for 12 years, the buildings of both old secondary schools, together with that of the nearby Westlake Primary School (abandoned in 2002), were finally demolished in January 2017 to make way for Raffles Girls' School (RGS), which would be relocated from Anderson Road near the town-centre at Orchard to Braddell in order to bring both RGS and Raffles Institution (RI) (both affiliated schools) closer together.

=== Closure ===
The last graduating batch was in 2005, after which the school buildings were formally closed. The remaining staff and students were transferred to Guangyang Secondary School. Due to the relatively short time that the remaining students would be spending in the new school, they were given the option of retaining their former school uniform instead of purchasing the new uniform.

== School song ==
In word and deed
Give honour to our school.
With purpose and determination
We excel and serve our family, community and nation.

Skills and values we’ll acquire
With loyalty we stand together
Striving to do the best we can
In Singapore our sovereign land.
