= Guangyang Secondary School =

Guangyang Secondary School 光洋中学 Sekolah Menengah Guangyang கோங்யாங் உயர் நிலைப்பள்ளிl

Location
- 8 Bishan Street 12, Singapore 579807
- Coordinates: 1°20′40.9″N 103°51′2.04″E

Information
- School type: Government Secondary
- Motto: Strong in Principles, Steadfast in Duty
- Established: 1 January 1987; 39 years ago
- Session: Single session
- School code: 3238
- Principal: Ms Tan Ke-Xin
- Colour: Gold Navy Blue
- Website: guangyangsec.moe.edu.sg

Guangyang Secondary School is a co-educational government secondary school in Bishan, Singapore. It merged with Braddell-Westlake Secondary School in 2006.

== History ==
=== Kong Yiong High School (1986) ===
Guangyang Secondary School has its humble origins in Kong Yiong High School which was located in Yio Chu Kang.
However, in 1986, Kong Yiong High School was closed due to a sharp drop in school enrolment.

=== Guangyang Secondary School (1987–2005) ===
In 1987, the School Advisory Committee of Kiong Yong High School left a sum of about S$60,000 which was to be given to a school that adopted its name.

While the new school was being set up in Bishan, it was decided that the old dialect name "Kong Yiong" be used. Hence, the new school came to be known as "Guangyang" which is the hanyu pinyin equivalent of "Kong Yiong". Thus, Guangyang, hanyu pinyin equivalent of "Kong Yiong" a government English medium school, was set up.

In its early months, Guangyang Secondary School shared the premises of Zhonghua Secondary School.

The school was officially opened on 27 June 1990 under its first principal, Leong Khin See.

The new school, costing S$7 million, had 28 classrooms, a library, an audio-visual theatrette, six science laboratories, two home economic rooms, an EOA room, four computer laboratory, an IT-enabled resource room, two technical workshops, a football field, a basketball court and a volleyball court (which has been converted into a street soccer court), and lastly, an indoor sports hall (shared with Guangyang Primary School).

The school had its second principal when Alice Tan Lee Huan assumed her position in 1993.

Guangyang Secondary School achieved the distinction of being one of the Top 18 Value-Added Schools in the Special/Express stream.

The school's third principal, Ng-Ong Phiak Kim, then took over since mid December 1996. The school was ranked as one of the Top 20 Value-Added Schools in the Special/Express Stream for consecutive 2 years. Guangyang ushered in the new year 2001 with its fourth principal, Ngiam Geak Kim.

Low Chee Moon took office as Guangyang Secondary School's fifth principal in 2002.

In December 2002, the school underwent upgrading via the Programme for Rebuilding and Improving Existing Schools and was temporarily shifted to Toa Payoh so that rebuilding could take place at its present site.

==== Merging with Braddell-Westlake Secondary School ====
In 2003, the Ministry of Education announced that Guangyang Secondary School and Braddell-Westlake Secondary School would merge in 2006. The secondary one cohorts of both schools collaborated to produce a ceramic mural wall that was installed in the merged school in early 2005.

In June 2003, Guangyang Secondary returned to its Bishan Campus. The school was presented Value-Added Award (Bronze) for its commendable performance in the 2004 GCE O Level Examination.

=== Post merger (2006–present) ===
Tan Miao Ling took over as the school's sixth principal in 2006. Guangyang and Braddell-Westlake Secondary School merged in 2006 and Guangyang Secondary's name is retained. Benjamin Kwok became the seventh principal in December 2012.

Alvin Lim took office as Guangyang Secondary School's eighth principal in December 2017. He joined Guangyang Secondary as a vice-principal in 2017.

== Notable alumni ==
- Gabriel Quak Jun Yi: football player
