= Dorothy Braddell =

British writer (1889–1981)

Dorothy Braddell (1889–1981) was a mid 20th century British writer and designer who had "a significant impact on the design of kitchens and domestic appliances" and on ideas about more efficient home management. She occasionally used her husband's name, Darcy Braddell, as a pseudonym in her writings.

== Biography ==
Dorothy Adelaide Bussé was born in London in 1889. She attended King's College, London, and then undertook further art studies at the Regent School Polytechnic and at the Byam Shaw School of Art, where she won a National Gold Medal for decorative design. In 1914 she married Darcy Braddell, an architect.

Braddell began her career working as an illustrator but after World War I moved into advertising. One of her clients was the petroleum consortium Shell-Mex and BP, for which she produced a series of posters and other promotional materials that expressed the company's commitment to environmental sensitivity. Another client was the food company Crosse and Blackwell. She also produced several public-service posters emphasizing the importance to health of cleanliness in the kitchen, using the tag line "Where There's Dirt There's Danger."

Braddell showed her designs at high-visibility exhibitions such as "British Art in Industry" at the Royal Academy (1935), the "Britain Can Make It" exhibition at the Victoria and Albert Museum (1946), the British Pavilion of the Paris Exhibition (1937), and a number of Daily Mail Ideal Home Exhibitions. During the 1930s, her design work aligned with the prevailing Art Deco aesthetic. From the 1930s to the 1950s, her interior design work focused on ways to make domestic management easier for women. She paid special attention to the kitchen and the ways that good planning combined with well-designed appliances and workflows could reduce domestic labor. For example, in the 1933 Daily Mail Ideal Home Exhibition she showed a plan for a small country house that combined the kitchen with the living room, while in the 1937 British Pavilion she showed a modern kitchen for a weekend house. She also worked directly with companies such as the Parkinson Stove Company on labor-saving appliance design, and she played a part in making the AGA cooker a symbol of the mid-century British kitchen.

Braddell also wrote on domestic design and management for various publications. She was involved in creating the British Council for Art and Industry's 1937 report entitled "Working Class Home: Its Furnishing and Equipment."

She worked into the 1960s and died in 1981.

The Victoria and Albert Museum holds some of her papers, including artwork produced for advertising; designs and photographs; and day books.
